= Artios Award for Outstanding Achievement in Casting – Big Budget Feature (Drama) =

Artios Award for Outstanding Achievement in Casting - Big Budget Feature (Drama)
- Presented by: Casting Society of America
- Formerly called: Outstanding Achievement in Feature Film Casting (1985); Outstanding Achievement in Feature Film Casting – Drama (1986–2007); Outstanding Achievement in Casting for a Studio Feature – Drama (2008)
- Established: 1985
- Currently held by: Sinners (2026)

Highlights
- Total: 41

The Artios Award for Outstanding Achievement in Casting – Big Budget Feature (Drama) is an award handed out annually by the Casting Society of America. The award, in its current incarnation, was first awarded in 2009, when the category made the distinction of award comedic films with larger budgets, and studio backing. Previously, since the second awards ceremony in 1986, the category had only held the distinction of Outstanding Achievement in Feature Film Casting – Drama. The award honors the casting directors of higher-budgeted, in comparison to independently-backed, films that the voting body believes featured the best casting.

== Winners and nominees ==
=== 1980s ===
Outstanding Achievement in Feature Film Casting

Year	Film	Casting Director(s)
1985 (1st)
1985 (1st)	Amadeus	Mary Goldberg
1985 (1st)	The Adventures of Buckaroo Banzai Across the 8th Dimension	Terry Liebling
1985 (1st)	The Natural	Ellen Chenoweth
1985 (1st)	Sixteen Candles	Jackie Burch
1985 (1st)	A Soldier's Story	Reuben Cannon

Outstanding Achievement in Feature Film Casting – Drama

Year	Film	Casting Director(s)
1986 (2nd)
1986 (2nd)	The Color Purple	Reuben Cannon
1986 (2nd)	Cocoon	Penny Perry, Beverly McDermott
1986 (2nd)	Mask	Mike Fenton, Jane Feinberg, Judy Taylor
1986 (2nd)	Silverado	Wally Nicita
1986 (2nd)	Witness	Dianne Crittenden
1987 (3rd)
1987 (3rd)	Platoon	Pat Golden, Bob Morones
1987 (3rd)	Aliens	Mike Fenton, Jane Feinberg, Judy Taylor
1987 (3rd)	At Close Range	Risa Bramon, Billy Hopkins
1987 (3rd)	Blue Velvet	Johanna Ray, Pat Golden
1987 (3rd)	Stand by Me	Jane Jenkins, Janet Hirshenson
1988 (4th)
1988 (4th)	The Last Emperor	Joanna Merlin
1988 (4th)	The Big Easy	Lynn Stalmaster, David Rubin
1988 (4th)	Fatal Attraction	Risa Bramon, Billy Hopkins
1988 (4th)	Gaby: A True Story	Johanna Ray
1988 (4th)	Weeds	Cathy Henderson, Barbara Hanley
1989 (5th)
1989 (5th)	Mississippi Burning	Howard Feuer, Juliet Taylor
1989 (5th)	Dominick and Eugene	Julie Hughes, Barry Moss
1989 (5th)	Field of Dreams	Margery Simkin
1989 (5th)	Mystic Pizza	Jane Jenkins, Janet Hirshenson
1989 (5th)	Tucker: The Man and His Dream	Jane Jenkins, Janet Hirshenson

=== 1990s ===
Year	Film	Casting Director(s)
1990 (6th)
1990 (6th)	Dead Poets Society	Howard Feuer
1990 (6th)	Born on the Fourth of July	Risa Bramon, Billy Hopkins
1990 (6th)	Enemies, A Love Story	Ellen Chenoweth
1990 (6th)	Glory	Mary Colquhoun
1990 (6th)	Longtime Companion	Jason LaPadura, Natalie Hart
1990 (6th)	sex, lies, and videotape	Deborah Aquila
1991 (7th)
1991 (7th)	Dances with Wolves	Howard Feuer
1991 (7th)	Avalon	Ellen Chenoweth
1991 (7th)	The Grifters	Juliet Taylor
1991 (7th)	Miller's Crossing	Donna Isaacson, John Lyons
1991 (7th)	Reversal of Fortune	Howard Feuer
1991 (7th)	The Silence of the Lambs	Howard Feuer
1992 (8th)
1992 (8th)	Fried Green Tomatoes	David Rubin
1992 (8th)	Barton Fink	Donna Isaacson, John Lyons
1992 (8th)	Bugsy	Ellen Chenoweth
1992 (8th)	JFK	Judy Taylor, Lynda Gordon, Geoffrey Johnson, Vincent Liff, Andrew Zerman
1992 (8th)	The Waterdance	Pam Dixon
1993 (9th)
1993 (9th)	Malcolm X	Robi Reed
1993 (9th)	Chaplin	Mike Fenton
1993 (9th)	A River Runs Through It	Elisabeth Leustig
1993 (9th)	Scent of a Woman	Ellen Lewis
1993 (9th)	School Ties	Pat McCorkle, Lisa Beach
1994 (10th)
1994 (10th)	The Joy Luck Club	Heidi Levitt, Risa Bramon Garcia
1994 (10th)	A Bronx Tale	Ellen Chenoweth
1994 (10th)	Philadelphia	Howard Feuer
1994 (10th)	Searching for Bobby Fischer	Avy Kaufman
1994 (10th)	What's Love Got to Do with It	Reuben Cannon
1995 (11th)
1995 (11th)	Pulp Fiction	Ronnie Yeskel, Gary Zuckerbrod
1995 (11th)	Forrest Gump	Ellen Lewis
1995 (11th)	Little Women	Carrie Frazier, Shani Ginsberg
1995 (11th)	My Family, Mi Familia	Janet Hirshenson, Jane Jenkins, Roger Mussenden
1995 (11th)	The Shawshank Redemption	Deborah Aquila
1996 (12th)
1996 (12th)	The Usual Suspects	Francine Maisler
1996 (12th)	Apollo 13	Jane Jenkins, Janet Hirshenson
1996 (12th)	Mr. Holland's Opus	Sharon Bialy
1996 (12th)	Nixon	Heidi Levitt
1996 (12th)	Primal Fear	Deborah Aquila, Jane Shannon Smith
1997 (13th)
1997 (13th)	The People vs. Larry Flynt	Francine Maisler, Jo Doster (location casting)
1997 (13th)	Big Night	Ellen Lewis
1997 (13th)	The English Patient	David Rubin
1997 (13th)	Lone Star	Avy Kaufman and Francine Maisler
1997 (13th)	Romeo + Juliet	David Rubin
1998 (14th)
1998 (14th)	L.A. Confidential	Mali Finn
1998 (14th)	The Horse Whisperer	Ellen Chenoweth, Gretchen Rennell Court
1998 (14th)	The Ice Storm	Avy Kaufman
1998 (14th)	Primary Colors	Juliet Taylor, Ellen Lewis, Juel Bestrop
1998 (14th)	Titanic	Mali Finn
1999 (15th)
1999 (15th)	Saving Private Ryan	Denise Chamian
1999 (15th)	Go	Joseph Middleton
1999 (15th)	October Sky	Nancy Foy, Jo Doster (location casting)
1999 (15th)	Out of Sight	Francine Maisler
1999 (15th)	Pleasantville	Ellen Lewis, Debra Zane

=== 2000s ===
Year	Film	Casting Director(s)
2000 (16th)
2000 (16th)	American Beauty	Debra Zane
2000 (16th)	Erin Brockovich	Margery Simkin
2000 (16th)	Girl, Interrupted	Lisa Beach
2000 (16th)	The Sixth Sense	Avy Kaufman
2000 (16th)	The Talented Mr. Ripley	Deborah Aquila
2001 (17th)
2001 (17th)	Traffic	Debra Zane
2001 (17th)	The Contender	Mary Jo Slater
2001 (17th)	Finding Forrester	Francine Maisler and Bernard Telsey
2001 (17th)	The Patriot	April Webster, David Bloch, Fincannon & Assoc. (location casting)
2001 (17th)	Remember the Titans	Ronna Kress
2002 (18th)
2002 (18th)	Moulin Rouge!	Ronna Kress
2002 (18th)	A Beautiful Mind	Jane Jenkins, Janet Hirshenson
2002 (18th)	Crazy/Beautiful	Sarah Halley Finn, Randy Hiller
2002 (18th)	Life as a House	Sarah Halley Finn, Randy Hiller
2002 (18th)	Mulholland Drive	Johanna Ray
2003 (19th)
2003 (19th)	The Hours	Daniel Swee
2003 (19th)	Igby Goes Down	Ronnie Yeskel, Richard Hicks
2003 (19th)	The Italian Job	Sheila Jaffe
2003 (19th)	Minority Report	Denise Chamian
2003 (19th)	Road to Perdition	Debra Zane, Mickie Paskal, Rachel Tenner (location casting)
2004 (20th)
2004 (20th)	Mystic River	Phyllis Huffman, Carolyn Pickman (location casting)
2004 (20th)	Big Fish	Denise Chamian
2004 (20th)	House of Sand and Fog	Deborah Aquila, Tricia Wood
2004 (20th)	Seabiscuit	Debra Zane
2004 (20th)	21 Grams	Francine Maisler
2005 (21st)
2005 (21st)	Crash	Sarah Halley Finn, Randi Hiller
2005 (21st)	Kinsey	Cindy Tolan
2005 (21st)	Million Dollar Baby	Phyllis Huffman
2005 (21st)	The Notebook	Matthew Barry, Nancy Green-Keyes
2005 (21st)	Ray	Nancy Klopper, Mark Fincannon (location casting)
2006 (22nd)
2006 (22nd)	Brokeback Mountain	Avy Kaufman
2006 (22nd)	Capote	Avy Kaufman; Heike Brandstatter, Coreen Mayrs (location casting)
2006 (22nd)	Memoirs of a Geisha	Francine Maisler
2006 (22nd)	Syriana	Avy Kaufman, Lora Kennedy, Lucinda Syson
2006 (22nd)	Walk the Line	Lisa Beach, Sarah Katzman
2007 (23rd)
2007 (23rd)	Dreamgirls	Debra Zane, Jay Binder
2007 (23rd)	The Good Shepherd	Amanda Mackey, Cathy Sandrich Gelfond
2007 (23rd)	Hollywoodland	Joanna Colbert
2007 (23rd)	The Lookout	Marcia S. Ross, Robin Cook (Toronto casting)
2007 (23rd)	The Namesake	Cindy Tolan
2007 (23rd)	World Trade Center	Mary Vernieu

Outstanding Achievement in Casting: Studio Feature – Drama

Year	Film	Casting Director(s)
2008 (24th)
2008 (24th)	No Country for Old Men	Ellen Chenoweth, Jo Edna Boldin (location casting)
2008 (24th)	Across the Universe	Bernard Telsey
2008 (24th)	American Gangster	Avy Kaufman
2008 (24th)	Iron Man	Sarah Halley Finn, Randi Hiller
2008 (24th)	Michael Clayton	Ellen Chenoweth

Outstanding Achievement in Casting: Big Budget Feature (Drama)

Year	Film	Casting Director(s)
2009 (25th)
2009 (25th)	Star Trek	April Webster, Alyssa Weisberg
2009 (25th)	Changeling	Ellen Chenoweth
2009 (25th)	The Dark Knight	John Papsidera
2009 (25th)	Duplicity	Ellen Chenoweth
2009 (25th)	State of Play	Avy Kaufman

=== 2010s ===
Year	Film	Casting Director(s)
2010 (26th)
2010 (26th)	Inglourious Basterds	Johanna Ray, Jenny Jue
2010 (26th)	Avatar	Margery Simkin, Mali Finn (initial casting)
2010 (26th)	Nine	Francine Maisler
2010 (26th)	Sherlock Holmes	Reg Poerscout-Edgerton
2010 (26th)	Shutter Island	Ellen Lewis, Carolyn Pickman (location casting)
2011 (27th)
2011 (27th)	The Social Network	Laray Mayfield
2011 (27th)	The Fighter	Sheila Jaffe, Angela Peri (location casting)
2011 (27th)	Inception	John Papsidera
2011 (27th)	The Town	Lora Kennedy, Carolyn Pickman (location casting)
2011 (27th)	True Grit	Ellen Chenoweth; Rachel Tenner, JoEdna Boldin (location casting)
2012 (28th)
2012 (28th)	The Help	Kerry Barden, Paul Schnee
2012 (28th)	The Descendants	John Jackson, John McAlary (associate)
2012 (28th)	The Girl with the Dragon Tattoo	Laray Mayfield
2012 (28th)	The Hunger Games	Debra Zane, Jackie Burch (location casting)
2012 (28th)	Moneyball	Francine Maisler, Lauren Grey (associate)
2013 (29th)
2013 (29th)	Argo	Lora Kennedy
2013 (29th)	Les Misérables	Nina Gold
2013 (29th)	Life of Pi	Avy Kaufman
2013 (29th)	Lincoln	Avy Kaufman; Erica Arvold, Pat Moran (location casting)
2013 (29th)	Zero Dark Thirty	Mark Bennett, Richard Hicks; Seher Latif (location casting); Charley Medigovich (associate)
2015 (30th)
2015 (30th)	12 Years a Slave	Francine Maisler, Meagan Lewis (location casting), Melissa Kostenbauder (associate)
2015 (30th)	American Hustle	Mary Vernieu, Lindsay Graham; Angela Peri (location casting)
2015 (30th)	Captain Phillips	Francine Maisler; Donna M. Belajac, Daniel Hubbard (location casting)
2015 (30th)	Foxcatcher	Jeanne McCarthy; Rori Bergman, Donna M. Belajac (location casting); Matthew Maisto (associate)
2015 (30th)	Gone Girl	Laray Mayfield, Annie Hamilton (location casting)
2015 (30th)	Selma	Aisha Coley, Robyn Owen (associate)
2016 (31st)
2016 (31st)	Straight Outta Compton	Cindy Tolan, Victoria Thomas; Meagan Lewis, Beth Sepko, Carolyn Pickman, Lucinda Syson, Pat Moran (location casting); Judith Sunga (associate)
2016 (31st)	Bridge of Spies	Ellen Lewis, Kate Sprance (associate)
2016 (31st)	Mad Max: Fury Road	Ronna Kress, Nikki Barrett
2016 (31st)	Spotlight	Kerry Barden, Paul Schnee; John Buchan, Jason Knight, Carolyn Pickman (location casting); Joey Montenarello, Adam Richards (associates)
2016 (31st)	Star Wars: The Force Awakens	Nina Gold, April Webster, Alyssa Weisberg; Jessica Sherman (associate)
2017 (32nd)
2017 (32nd)	Hidden Figures	Victoria Thomas; Jackie Burch (location casting); Bonnie Grisan (associate)
2017 (32nd)	Arrival	Francine Maisler, Lucie Robitaille (location casting)
2017 (32nd)	Fantastic Beasts and Where to Find Them	Fiona Weir, Jim Carnahan (location casting)
2017 (32nd)	The Girl on the Train	Kerry Barden, Paul Schnee; Joey Montenarello, Adam Richards (associates)
2017 (32nd)	Nocturnal Animals	Francine Maisler
2018 (33rd)
2018 (33rd)	Dunkirk	John Papsidera
2018 (33rd)	Baby Driver	Francine Maisler, Meagan Lewis (location casting)
2018 (33rd)	Detroit	Victoria Thomas, Richard Hicks (New York casting), Carolyn Pickman (location casting), Scotty Anderson (associate)
2018 (33rd)	The Post	Ellen Lewis, Rori Bergman; Kate Sprance, Karlee Fomalont (associates)
2018 (33rd)	Wonder Woman	Lora Kennedy, Kristy Carlson, Lucinda Syson; Jeanette Benzie (associate)
2019 (34th)
2019 (34th)	Vice	Francine Maisler, Amber Wakefield (additional casting)
2019 (34th)	Boy Erased	Carmen Cuba; Tara Feldstein Bennett, Chase Paris (location casting); Shelby Cherniet (associate)
2019 (34th)	The Hate U Give	Yesi Ramirez; Tara Feldstein Bennett, Chase Paris (location casting)
2019 (34th)	A Star Is Born	Mary Vernieu, Lindsay Graham; Raylin Sabo (associate)
2019 (34th)	Widows	Francine Maisler; Jennifer Rudnicke, Mickie Paskal (location casting); Amber Wakefield (associate)

=== 2020s ===
Year	Film	Casting Director(s)
2020 (35th)
2020 (35th)	Once Upon a Time in Hollywood	Victoria Thomas
2020 (35th)	1917	Nina Gold
2020 (35th)	The Irishman	Ellen Lewis; Associate: Kate Sprance
2020 (35th)	Joker	Shayna Markowitz
2020 (35th)	Little Women	Francine Maisler, Kathy Driscoll-Mohler; Location Casting: Douglas Aibel, Carolyn Pickman
2021 (36th)
2021 (36th)	The Trial of the Chicago 7	Francine Maisler; Location Casting: Mia Cusumano, Jennifer Rudnicke, Mickie Pascal; Associate: Kathy Driscoll-Mohler, Molly Rose, AJ Links
2021 (36th)	Da 5 Bloods	Kim Coleman; Location Casting: Juliette Menager
2021 (36th)	Hillbilly Elegy	Carmen Cuba; Location Casting: Tara Feldstein Bennett, Chase Paris and D. Lynn Meyers; Associate: Judith Sunga
2021 (36th)	Judas and the Black Messiah	Alexa L. Fogel; Location Casting: Donna Belajac; Associate: Elizabeth Berra, Missy Finnell
2021 (36th)	Mulan	Debra Zane; Chinese Casting Consultant: PoPing AuYeung; Associate: Dylan Jury
2022 (37th)
2022 (37th)	West Side Story	Cindy Tolan, Nicholas Petrovich (Associate)
2022 (37th)	House of Gucci	Kate Rhodes-James
2022 (37th)	King Richard	Rich Delia, Avy Kaufman, Adam Richards (Associate), Scotty Anderson (Associate)
2022 (37th)	The Power of the Dog	Nikki Barrett, Carmen Cuba, Nina Gold, Martin Ware (Associate)
2022 (37th)	Tick, Tick... Boom!	Bernard Telsey and Kristian Charbonier
2023 (38th)
2023 (38th)	The Fabelmans	Cindy Tolan, Nicholas Petrovich (associate casting director)
2023 (38th)	Black Panther: Wakanda Forever	Sarah Halley Finn, Carla Hool (location casting), Tara Feldstein Bennett (location casting), Chase Paris (location casting), Molly Doyle (associate casting director)
2023 (38th)	Elvis	Denise Chamian, Nikki Barrett, Beth Day (associate casting director) Liz Ludwitzke (associate casting director)
2023 (38th)	Tár	Avy Kaufman, Simone Bär (location casting), Jeremy Zimmerman (location casting)
2023 (38th)	Till	Kim Coleman, Tara Feldstein Bennett (location casting), Chase Paris (location casting), Stefni Colle (associate casting director)
2024 (39th)
2024 (39th)	Killers of the Flower Moon	Ellen Lewis, Rene Haynes, Kate Sprance (Associate Casting Director)
2024 (39th)	The Color Purple	Bernard Telsey, Tiffany Little Canfield and Destiny Lilly
2024 (39th)	Maestro	Shayna Markowitz, Dayna Katz (Associate Casting Director)
2024 (39th)	Oppenheimer	John Papsidera
2024 (39th)	Saltburn	Kharmel Cochrane
2025 (40th)
2025 (40th)	A Complete Unknown	Yesi Ramirez; Rori Bergman, Karlee Fomalont (Location Casting Directors); Kate Sprance (Location Associate Casting Director)
2025 (40th)	Blitz	Nina Gold; Lucy Amos (Associate Casting Director)
2025 (40th)	Civil War	Francine Maisler; Amber Wakefield (Associate Casting Director); Meagan Lewis, Rebecca Carfagna (Location Casting Directors)
2025 (40th)	Dune: Part Two	Francine Maisler; Kathy Driscoll-Mohler, Molly Rose (Associate Casting Directors); Dixie Chassay (Location Casting Director)
2025 (40th)	Gladiator II	Kate Rhodes James
2025 (40th)	Queer	Jessica Ronane
2026 (41st)
2026 (41st)	Sinners	Francine Maisler; Molly Rose and Amber Wakefield (Associate Casting Directors); Meagan Lewis (Location Casting Director)
2026 (41st)	Bugonia	Jennifer Venditti; Alan Scott Neal (Associate Casting Director)
2026 (41st)	F1	Lucy Bevan and Emily Brockmann; Katie Brydon (Associate Casting Director); Tara Feldstein Bennett, Chase Paris, and Tara Mazzucca (Location Casting Directors)
2026 (41st)	Frankenstein	Robin D. Cook; Jonathan Oliveira (Associate Casting Director)
2026 (41st)	Hamnet	Nina Gold; Lucy Amos (Associate Casting Director)
2026 (41st)	Marty Supreme	Jennifer Venditti; Alan Scott Neal (Associate Casting Director); Ko Iwagami (Location Casting Director)

== Individuals with multiple awards ==
6 awards

- Francine Maisler

3 awards

- Howard Feuer
- Debra Zane

2 awards

- Meagan Lewis
- Carolyn Pickman

== Individuals with multiple nominations ==
21 nominations

- Francine Maisler

11 nominations

- Ellen Chenoweth
- Avy Kaufman

8 nominations

- Ellen Lewis
- Debra Zane

7 nominations

- Carolyn Pickman

6 nominations

- Howard Feuer

5 nominations

- Deborah Aquila
- Janet Hirshenson
- Jane Jenkins

4 nominations

- Sarah Halley Finn
- Risa Bramon Garcia
- Randi Hiller
- Lora Kennedy
- Johanna Ray
- David Rubin

3 nominations

- Kerry Barden
- Lisa Beach
- Jackie Burch
- Reuben Cannon
- Denise Chamian
- Mike Fenton
- Mali Finn
- Richard Hicks
- Billy Hopkins
- Ronna Kress
- Meagan Lewis
- Laray Mayfield
- John Papsidera
- Paul Schnee
- Margery Simkin
- Lucinda Syson
- Judy Taylor
- Juliet Taylor
- Victoria Thomas
- Cindy Tolan
- Mary Vernieu
- April Webster

2 nominations

- Donna M. Belajac
- Tara Feldstein Bennett
- Rori Bergman
- Jo Edna Boldin
- Jo Doster
- Jane Feinberg
- Mark Fincannon
- Nina Gold
- Pat Golden
- Lindsay Graham
- Phyllis Huffman
- Donna Isaacson
- Sheila Jaffe
- Heidi Levitt
- John Lyons
- Shayna Markowitz
- Joey Montenarello
- Pat Moran
- Chase Paris
- Mickie Paskal
- Angela Peri
- Adam Richards
- Kate Sprance
- Bernard Telsey
- Rachel Tenner
- Amber Wakefield
- Ronnie Yeskel
