= 40th Artios Awards =

American film and television awards

- Date: February 12, 2025
- Site: The Beverly Hilton, Los Angeles; The Edison Ballroom, New York City; White City House, London
- Country: United States
- Presented by: Casting Society of America
- Website: www.castingsociety.com/awards/artios

The 40th Artios Awards, presented on February 12, 2025, by the Casting Society of America, honored the best in originality, creativity and contribution of casting professionals to the overall quality of a film, television series, short form project, theatre production and commercial. The ceremony took place simultaneously at The Beverly Hilton in Los Angeles, the Edison Ballroom in New York, and the White City House in London.

The nominations for the television, short form project, and theatre categories were announced on November 1, 2024. The nominations for the film categories were announced on December 16, 2024. The category for Live Television Performance, Variety, or Sketch – Comedy, Drama, or Musical was dropped while the category for International Television Series was introduced.

Nominations for the feature film categories were announced on December 17, 2024. The category for Feature Micro Budget – Comedy or Drama was not presented while an award for International Films was introduced, similar to the television categories.

== Winners and nominees ==
=== Film ===
Feature Big Budget – Comedy: Wicked – Bernard Telsey, Tiffany Little Canfield; Ryan Bernard Tymensky (Associate Casting Director); Tamsyn Manson (Location Casting Director); Beetlejuice Beetlejuice – Sophie Holland; Angela Peri, Lisa Lobel (Location Casting Directors); Melissa Morris (Location Associate Casting Director); Challengers – Francine Maisler; Molly Rose (Associate Casting Director); Deadpool & Wolverine – Sarah Halley Finn; Jacqueline Gallagher, Jordyn Gregory (Associate Casting Directors); Lucy Bevan, Emily Brockmann (Location Casting Directors); Katie Brydon (Location Associate Casting Director); Nightbitch – Douglas Aibel; Matthew Glasner (Associate Casting Director); Saturday Night – John Papsidera	Feature Big Budget – Drama: A Complete Unknown – Yesi Ramirez; Rori Bergman, Karlee Fomalont (Location Casting Directors); Kate Sprance (Location Associate Casting Director); Blitz – Nina Gold; Lucy Amos (Associate Casting Director); Civil War – Francine Maisler; Amber Wakefield (Associate Casting Director); Meagan Lewis, Rebecca Carfagna (Location Casting Directors); Dune: Part Two – Francine Maisler; Kathy Driscoll-Mohler, Molly Rose (Associate Casting Directors); Dixie Chassay (Location Casting Director); Gladiator II – Kate Rhodes James; Queer – Jessica Ronane
Feature Studio or Independent – Comedy: My Old Ass – Douglas Aibel; Matthew Glasner (Associate Casting Director); A Different Man – Maribeth Fox; Kimberly Ostroy (Associate Casting Director); Ezra – Kerry Barden, Paul Schnee; Roya Semnanian, Rachel Goldman (Associate Casting Directors); Hit Man – Vicky Boone; Liz Kelley (Associate Casting Director); A Real Pain – Jessica Kelly; Thelma – Jamie Ember	Feature Studio or Independent – Drama: Conclave – Nina Gold, Martin Ware; Francesco Vedovati, Barbara Giordani (Location Casting Directors); The Apprentice – Carmen Cuba, Stephanie Gorin; Brendan Wilcocks (Associate Casting Director); Heretic – Carmen Cuba; Charley Medigovich (Associate Casting Director); Tiffany Mak (Location Casting Director); Lee – Lucy Bevan, Olivia Grant; Nickel Boys – Victoria Thomas; Jennifer Yoo (Associate Casting Director); Meagan Lewis (Location Casting Director); September 5 – Nancy Foy, Lucinda Syson, Simone Bär; Natasha Vincent (Associate Casting Director); Juliette Ménager (Location Casting Director)
Feature Low Budget – Comedy or Drama: Janet Planet – Jessica Kelly; Empire Waist – Rori Bergman; Karlee Fomalont (Associate Casting Director); Fancy Dance – Stacey Rice; Chris Freihofer (Location Casting Director); The Graduates – Kerry Barden, Paul Schnee; Roya Semnanian, Rachel Goldman (Associate Casting Directors); Jeff Johnson (Location Casting Director); Omni Loop – Kate Geller, Taylor Williams; Ross Shenker (Associate Casting Director); Tokyo Cowboy – Emily Schweber; Your Monster – Scotty Anderson	International Film: Emilia Pérez – Carla Hool; Susan Putnam (Associate Casting Director); The Buckingham Murders – Shakyra Dowling; Julie Keeps Quiet – Sien Josephine Teijssen; Kneecap – Carla Stronge; Samia – Cassandra Han; The Settlers – Jessie Frost; Touch – Yoko Narahashi; Xanthe Spencer-Davidson (Location Casting Director)
Feature Animation: The Wild Robot – Christi Soper Hilt; Inside Out 2 – Natalie Lyon, Kevin Reher, Kate Hansen-Birnbaum; Lexi Diamond (Associate Casting Director); Moana 2 – Grace C. Kim; Mufasa: The Lion King – Francine Maisler, Molly Rose; Spellbound – Jason Henkel

=== Television ===
Television Series – Comedy: Hacks (Season 3) – Nicole Abellera Hallman, Jeanne McCarthy; Anna Mayworm (Associate Casting Director); The Bear (Season 2) – Jeanie Bacharach; Mickie Paskal, Jennifer Rudnicke, AJ Links (Location Casting Director); Kaitlin Shaw (Location Associate Casting Director); Julia (Season 2) – Sharon Bialy, Gohar Gazazyan; Stacia Kimler (Associate Casting Director); Lisa Lobel, Angela Peri (Location Casting Director); Melissa Morris (Location Associate Casting Director); Loot (Season 2) – Jill Anthony Thomas, Anthony J. Kraus; Katrina Wandel George (Associate Casting Director); Only Murders in the Building (Season 3) – Bernard Telsey, Tiffany Little Canfield, Destiny Lilly; Reservation Dogs (Season 3) – Angelique Midthunder; Stacey Rice, Tara Mazzucca (Associate Casting Director); Chris Freihofer (Location Casting Director)	Television Series – Drama: Slow Horses (Season 3) – Nina Gold; Melissa Gethin Clarke (Associate Casting Director); The Chi (Season 6) – Carmen Cuba, Judith Sunga; Christal Karge, Marisa Ross (Location Casting Directors); Jenn Noyes (Location Associate Casting Director); The Crown (Season 6) – Robert Sterne; Luci Lenox (Location Casting Director); The Gilded Age (Season 2) – Bernard Telsey, Adam Caldwell; Amelia Rasche McCarthy (Associate Casting Director); The Morning Show (Season 3) – Victoria Thomas; The Summer I Turned Pretty (Season 2) – Lyndsey Baldasare, David H. Rapaport; Kimberly Wistedt, Lisa Mae Fincannon (Location Casting Directors)
Television Pilot and First Season – Comedy: Palm Royale – Kerry Barden, Paul Schnee; Roya Semnanian, Rachel Goldman (Associate Casting Directors); The Brothers Sun – Jenny Jue; Djinous Rowling, Tanya Giang (Associate Casting Directors); Colin from Accounts – Kirsty McGregor; The Gentlemen – Dan Hubbard; Survival of the Thickest – Felicia Fasano; Katie Lantz (Associate Casting Director)	Television Pilot and First Season – Drama: Shōgun – Laura Schiff, Carrie Audino; Chelsea Egozi (Associate Casting Director); Kei Kawamura (Location Casting Director); 3 Body Problem – Nina Gold, Robert Sterne; The Curse – Angelique Midthunder, Jennifer Venditti; Tara Mazzucca (Associate Casting Director); Victoria Cadwallader, Jennifer Schwalenberg (Location Casting Directors); Elsbeth – Mark Saks, Findley Davidson; John Andrews (Associate Casting Director); Fallout – John Papsidera; Julie Tucker, Ross Meyerson (Location Casting Directors); The Girls on the Bus – Junie Lowry-Johnson, Libby Goldstein, Erica A. Hart; Josh Ropiequet, Briana Dunlay (Associate Casting Directors); Mr. & Mrs. Smith – Carmen Cuba; Charley Medigovich (Associate Casting Director); Sugar – Sherry Thomas, Sharon Bialy, Rebecca Mangieri; Samantha Rood (Associate Casting Director)
Limited Series: Baby Reindeer – Nina Gold, Martin Ware; All the Light We Cannot See – Lucy Bevan, Emily Brockmann; Katie Brydon (Associate Casting Director); Susanne Scheel (Location Casting Director); Fargo – Rachel Tenner; Rick Messina (Associate Casting Director); Stephanie Gorin, Jackie Lind, Rhonda Fisekci (Location Casting Directors); Brendan Wilcocks (Location Associate Casting Director); Feud: Capote vs. The Swans – Alexa L. Fogel; Kathryn Zamora-Benson (Associate Casting Director); Ripley – Avy Kaufman; Scotty Anderson (Associate Casting Director); Francesco Vedovati, Barbara Giordani (Location Casting Directors); True Detective: Night Country – Francine Maisler; Amber Wakefield, Molly Rose (Associate Casting Directors); Jessica Ronane, Deborah Schildt (Location Casting Directors)	Film, First Released for Television or Streaming: The Idea of You – Bernard Telsey, Tiffany Little Canfield; Brian Sutow (Associate Casting Director), Chase Paris, Tara Feldstein (Location Casting Directors); Flamin' Hot – Carla Hool; Jo Edna Boldin, Marie McMaster (Location Casting Directors); The Great Lillian Hall – Jessica Fox-Thigpen; Quiz Lady – Nicole Abellera Hallman, Jeanne McCarthy; Erica Johnson (Associate Casting Director); Ryan Glorioso (Location Casting Director); Justin Coulter (Location Associate Casting Director); Red, White & Royal Blue – Rich Delia, Kelly Valentine Hendry; Jessica Mescall (Location Associate Casting Director); Scoop – Nina Gold, Martin Ware
Animated Program for Television: Blue Eye Samurai (Season 1) – Margery Simkin, Orly Sitowitz; Elizabeth Vitale, Jasmine Gutierrez (Associate Casting Directors); Big Mouth (Season 7) – Julie Ashton; Bob's Burgers (Season 14) – Julie Ashton; Dee & Friends in Oz (Season 1) – Rachel Reiss, Angela Mickey; Family Guy (Season 22) – Jackie Sollitto, Christine Terry; Rick and Morty (Season 7) – Robert McGee, Ruth Lambert; Sara Jane Sherman (Additional Casting)	Live Action Children & Family Series: Avatar: The Last Airbender (Season 1) – Michael Nicolo, Anya Colloff, Michelle Olivia Tidwell; Tiffany Mak, PoPing AuYeung (Canada an Asia Casting); Amanda Mitchell (Australia Casting); Theo Park (UK Casting); Goosebumps (Season 1) – Nicole Abellera Hallman, Jeanne McCarthy; Tara David (Associate Casting Director); High School Musical: The Musical: The Series (Season 4) – Julie Ashton; Jeff Johnson (Location Casting Director); My Life with the Walter Boys (Season 1) – Becky Silverman, Gary Zuckerbrod, Ramani Leah; Jackie Lind (Location Casting Director); Percy Jackson and the Olympians (Season 1) – Denise Chamian, Jordana Sapiurka; Candice Elzinga (Location Casting Director); The Spiderwick Chronicles (Season 1) – Denise Chamian, Liz Ludwitzke; Candice Elzinga (Location Casting Director)
Reality Series – Competition: RuPaul's Drag Race (Season 16) – Goloka Bolte, Ethan Petersen; The Circle (Season 6) – Erin Tomasello; Joy Herrera, Sena Rich (Casting Producers); The Golden Bachelor (Season 1) – Lindsay Liles; Squid Game: The Challenge (Season 1) – Erika Dobrin, Robyn Kass; Christopher Burnley, Tony Miros (Casting Producers); Top Chef (Season 21) – Ron Mare; Heather Allyn, Joy Barrett, Sena Rich (Casting Producers)	Reality Series – Structured and Unstructured: Queer Eye (Season 8) – Pamela Vallarelli, Quinn Fegan, Jessica Jorgensen, Danielle Gervais; The Great Christmas Light Fight (Season 11) – Kristen Moss; Asjai Lou, Tony Miros, Thea Washington (Casting Producers); Shark Tank (Season 15) – Mindy Zemrak; sMothered (Season 5) – Paul Head; Vanderpump Villa (Season 1) – Damon Furberg, Heather Allyn
International Television Series: Monsieur Spade – Olivia Scott-Webb, Constance Demontoy; Nana Akoto – Mawuko Kuadzi; Rhythm + Flow France – Jennifer Teixido; The Turkish Detective – Harika Uygur, Sophie Holland; Zorro – Carla Hool

=== Short Form Projects ===
Short Film: The Roof – Candido Cornejo; Abel – Carla Hool; By Any Other Name – Shakyra Dowling; Guts – Conrad Woolfe; Rapt – Walter Ware, Rachel Imbriglio; The Rebel Girls – Leah Daniels-Butler	Short Form Series: Command Z – Carmen Cuba, Salvatore Schiavone; Crossing Cultures – Kristen Moss; Nesting – Jason Knight, John Buchan; RZR – Claire Koonce; Tales of Terror – Nickole Doro; Tires – Diane Heery, Jason Loftus

=== Theatre ===
Broadway – Comedy or Drama: Stereophonic – Alaine Alldaffer, Taylor Williams; Appropriate – Jim Carnahan, Alexandre Bleau; Jaja's African Hair Braiding – Kelly Gillespie, David Caparelliotis, Erica A. Hart; Mother Play – Will Cantler, Karyn Casl; Charlie Hano (Associate Casting Director); Purlie Victorious – Will Cantler, Destiny Lilly; Uncle Vanya – Daniel Swee	Broadway – Musical: The Outsiders – Tara Rubin, Xavier Rubiano; Cabaret at the Kit Kat Club – Bernard Telsey, Kristian Charbonier; Hell's Kitchen – Kate Murray, Heidi Griffiths; Here Lies Love – Tara Rubin, Xavier Rubiano; Suffs – Heidi Griffiths, Kate Murray; Water for Elephants – Tara Rubin, Claire Burke; Frankie Ramirez (Associate Casting Director)
New York Theatre – Comedy or Drama: Oh, Mary! – Henry Russell Bergstein; Russian Troll Farm – Karyn Casl; The Comeuppance – David Caparelliotis; The Night of the Iguana – Stephanie Klapper; The Pianist – Will Cantler, Destiny Lilly; Charlie Hano (Associate Casting Director); The Welkin – Karyn Casl, Destiny Lilly	New York Theatre – Musical: Here We Are – Bernard Telsey, Adam Caldwell; Geoff Josselson (Associate Casting Director); Fiddler on the Roof – Geoff Josselson; (pray) – Destiny Lilly; Rent – Kevin Metzger-Timson; The Great Gatsby – Jillian Cimini, Stephen Kopel; Neal Buckley (Associate Casting Director); The Lonely Few – Beth Lipari, Phyllis Schuringa, Craig Burns, Destiny Lilly; Charlie Hano (Associate Casting Director)
Los Angeles Theatre: Reefer Madness The Musical – Michael Donovan, Richie Ferris; Deathtrap – Michael Donovan, Richie Ferris; Fetch Clay – Kim Coleman; Inherit the Wind – Ryan Bernard Tymensky, Rose Bochner; Jelly's Last Jam (Pasadena Playhouse) – Ryan Bernard Tymensky; Blank Theatre Company's 31st Annual Young Playwrights Festival – Erica S. Bream, Cara Chute Rosenbaum	Regional Theatre: A Strange Loop – Destiny Lilly; A Christmas Carol (Goodman Theatre) – Lauren Port; Rachael Jimenez (Associate Casting Director); Another Marriage – JC Clementz; Antigone – Becca McCracken; Clyde's – Stephanie Klapper; Fat Ham – David Caparelliotis; The Who's Tommy – Lauren Port, Merri Sugarman; Rachael Jimenez (Associate Casting Director), Spencer Gualdoni
Special Theatrical Performance: West Side Story (Lyric Opera of Chicago) – Merri Sugarman; Becca McCracken (Location Casting Director); Chess – Destiny Lilly; Into the Woods – Geoff Josselson; Jelly's Last Jam (NY City Center) – Destiny Lilly, Rashad Naylor; The Light in the Piazza – Kristian Charbonier, Patrick Goodwin; tick, tick... BOOM! – Geoff Josselson	Theatre Tours: MJ the Musical – Lindsay Levine, Rachel Hoffman; Company – Merri Sugarman; Spencer Gualdoni (Associate Casting Director); Funny Girl (National Tour) – Jim Carnahan, Jason Thinger; Mamma Mia! – Kevin Metzger-Timson, Spencer Gualdoni (Associate Casting Director); Mrs. Doubtfire – Craig Burns; The Wiz – Tara Rubin, Olivia Paige West

=== Commercials ===
Commercial
- NFL Super Bowl LVIII: "Born to Play" – Mawuko Kuadzi
  - Boulder Crest Foundation: "PSA" – Liz Lewis
  - Chevy: "Chevy's A Holiday to Remember" – John Ort, Kathleen Chopin, Sarah Cayce
  - Mr P. 30 – Nina Pratt
  - CBS Sports: UEFA Champions League - Nobody Watches Like U.S. – John Ort, Kathleen Chopin
  - Roland – Tree Petts

== Honorary Awards ==
- Veteran casting director David Grindrod was awarded the Creative Collaboration Award. The honor is in recognition of significant and outstanding creative or professional contributions to the entertainment industry, including distinctive support of casting professionals and the art and craft of casting.
- The Rosalie Joseph Humanitarian Award was presented posthumously to Zora DeHorter.
- The Associate Casting Director / Casting Producer Spotlight Award recipients were presented to Amanda Ogen and Josy Rodriguez. The award recognizes and celebrates the achievements of Associate Casting Directors and Casting Producers in CSA.
