= 32nd Artios Awards =

Annual US film and television award

- Date: January 19, 2017
- Location: Stage 48, New York City, United States; Beverly Hilton Hotel, Los Angeles, United States
- Country: United States
- Presented by: Casting Society of America
- Hosted by: Michael Urie (New York City); Joel McHale (Los Angeles)
- Website: www.castingsociety.com/awards/artios

The 32nd Artios Awards, presented by the Casting Society of America, honored the best originality, creativity and the contribution of casting to the overall quality of a film, television, theatre and short-form projects. The ceremony was held on January 19, 2017, in simultaneous ceremonies at the Beverly Hilton Hotel, Los Angeles and Stage 48 in New York City. The New York City ceremony was hosted by Michael Urie, while Joel McHale hosted the Los Angeles ceremony.

The television and theatre nominations were announced on September 27, 2016. The film nominations were announced on January 3, 2017.

== Winners and nominees ==
Winners are listed first and highlighted in boldface:

=== Film ===
**Big Budget – Comedy**: **La La Land – Deborah Aquila, Tricia Wood**; Deadpool – Ronna Kress; Location Casting: Jennifer Page, Corinne Clark; Hail, Caesar! – Ellen Chenoweth; Associate: Susanne Scheel; Rules Don't Apply – David Rubin; Associate: Melissa Pryor; Whiskey Tango Foxtrot – Bernard Telsey, Tiffany Little Canfield; Location Casting: Jo Edna Boldin; Associate: Conrad Woolfe, Marie A.K. McMaster	**Big Budget – Drama**: **Hidden Figures – Victoria Thomas; Location Casting: Jackie Burch; Associate: Bonnie Grisan**; Arrival – Francine Maisler; Location Casting: Lucie Robitaille; Fantastic Beasts and Where to Find Them – Fiona Weir; Location Casting: Jim Carnahan; The Girl on the Train – Kerry Barden, Paul Schnee; Associate: Joey Montenarello, Adam Richards; Nocturnal Animals – Francine Maisler
**Studio or Independent – Comedy**: **Hell or High Water – Richard Hicks, Jo Edna Boldin; Associate: Chris Redondo, Marie A.K. McMaster**; 20th Century Women – Laura Rosenthal, Mark Bennett; Bad Moms – Cathy Sandrich Gelfond; Location Casting: Meagan Lewis; Café Society – Juliet Taylor, Patricia DiCerto; Associate: Meghan Rafferty; The Edge of Seventeen – Melissa Kostenbauder; Location Casting: Coreen Mayrs, Heike Brandstatter	**Studio or Independent – Drama**: **Manchester by the Sea – Douglas Aibel; Location Casting: Carolyn Pickman; Associate: Henry Russell Bergstein**; Captain Fantastic – Jeanne McCarthy; Location Casting: Angelique Midthunder, Amey Rene; Jackie – Mary Vernieu, Lindsay Graham; Location Casting: Jessica Kelly; Lion – Kirsty McGregor; Loving – Francine Maisler; Location Casting: Erica Arvold, Anne N. Chapman; Associate: Michelle Kelly
**Low Budget – Comedy or Drama**: **Moonlight – Yesi Ramirez**; Christine – Douglas Aibel, Stephanie Holbrook; Location Casting: Tracy Kilpatrick; Associate: Blair Foster; Goat – Susan Shopmaker; Location Casting: D. Lynn Meyers; Hello, My Name Is Doris – Sunday Boling, Meg Morman; White Girl – Jessica Daniels	**Animation**: **Moana** – Jamie Sparer Roberts; Location Casting: Rachel Sutton; Finding Dory – Kevin Reher, Natalie Lyon; The Jungle Book – Sarah Halley Finn; Associate: Tamara Hunter; The Little Prince – Sarah Halley Finn; Associate: Tamara Hunter; Zootopia – Jamie Sparer Roberts

=== Television ===
**Television Series – Comedy**: **Transparent – Eyde Belasco**; Black-ish – Alexis Frank Koczara, Christine Smith Shevchenko, Amanda Lenker Doyle; Girls – Jennifer Euston; Associate: Emer O'Callaghan; Silicon Valley – Jeanne McCarthy, Nicole Abellera Hallman; Unbreakable Kimmy Schmidt – Cindy Tolan; Associate: Anne Davison	**Television Series – Drama**: **Bloodline – Debra Zane; Location Casting: Lori Wyman; Associate: Shayna Markowitz, Marie-Therese Verbruggen, Erin Fragetta**; The Americans – Rori Bergman; Game of Thrones – Nina Gold, Robert Sterne, Carla Stronge; House of Cards – Laray Mayfield, Julie Schubert; Orange Is the New Black – Jennifer Euston; Associate: Emer O'Callaghan
**Television Pilot and First Season – Comedy**: **Crazy Ex-Girlfriend – Felicia Fasano, Bernard Telsey, Tim Payne; Associate: Tara Nostramo, Conrad Woolfe, Abbie Brady-Dalton**; Casual – John Papsidera, Deanna Brigidi; Scream Queens – Richard Hicks; Location Casting: Meagan Lewis; Associate: Chris Redondo; Superstore – Susie Farris, Collin Daniel, Brett Greenstein; Associate: Sherie Hernandez, Melanie Crescenz; Wet Hot American Summer: First Day of Camp – Susie Farris, Melanie Crescenz	**Television Pilot and First Season – Drama**: **Mr. Robot – Susie Farris, Beth Bowling, Kim Miscia; Associate: Michael Rios, Melanie Crescenz**; Billions – Allison Estrin, Avy Kaufman; Associate: Melissa Moss; Man in the High Castle – Denise Chamian, Liz Ludwitzke; Location Casting: Candice Elzinga, Patti Kalles; Narcos – Carmen Cuba, Carla Hool; Associate: Wittney Horton; Unreal – Barbara Fiorentino, Katrina Wandel; Location Casting: Coreen Mayrs, Heike Brandstatter
**Television Movie or Miniseries**: **The People v. O. J. Simpson: American Crime Story – Jeanne McCarthy, Nicole Abellera Hallman, Courtney Bright, Nicole Daniels; Associate: Cara Chute Rosenbaum**; Fargo – Rachel Tenner; Location Casting: Jackie Lind, Stephanie Gorin; Associate: Charlene Lee; Grease: Live – Bernard Telsey, Tiffany Little Canfield, Justin Huff; Roots – Victoria Thomas; Location Casting: Meagan Lewis; The Night Manager – Jina Jay	**Children's Pilot and Series (Live Action)**: **School of Rock – Suzanne Goddard-Smythe; Associate: Ty Harman**; Austin & Ally – Carol Goldwasser; Fuller House – Alexis Frank Koczara, Christine Smith Shevchenko; Associate: Amanda Lenker Doyle; Girl Meets World – Sally Stiner, Barbie Block; Henry Danger – Krisha Bullock, Jamie Snow
**Television Animation**: **Bob's Burgers – Julie Ashton-Barson**; American Dad! – Linda Lamontagne; BoJack Horseman – Linda Lamontagne; Family Guy – Linda Lamontagne; Robot Chicken – Linda Lamontagne	**Television Unscripted Series**: **Billion Dollar Buyer – Candra Nazzaro**; Are You the One? – Damon Furberg, Shannon McCarty; Dating Naked – Damon Furberg, Heather Allyn; Redneck Island: Battle at the Lake – Brendon Blincoe; Twinning – Damon Furberg, Heather Allyn

=== Short-Form Projects ===
**Short Film**: **Youth – Adrienne Stern; Location Casting: Nina Henninger**; Elemental – Erica Arvold; Gubagude Ko (Blood is Upon Them) – Susanne Scheel; Monsters – Nancy Nayor, Andy Henry; Video – Lois Drabkin	**Short Form Series**: **Her Story – Geralyn Flood**; Bajillion Dollar Propertie$ – Julie Ashton-Barson; Cop Show – Adrienne Stern; Guidance – Sheryl Levine; Margot vs Lilly – Meghan Rafferty; Associate: Mia Cusumano; Relationship Status – Meg Morman, Sunday Boling

=== Theatre ===
**New York Broadway Theatre**: **The Humans – Carrie Gardner**; Blackbird – David Caparelliotis; Associate: Lauren Port; The Father – Nancy Piccione; Long Day's Journey into Night – Jim Carnahan, Carrie Gardner; Noises Off – Jim Carnahan, Stephen Kopel	**New York Broadway Theatre – Musical**: **Hamilton – Bethany Knox**; The Color Purple – Justin Huff; Fiddler on the Roof – Abbie Brady-Dalton; School of Rock – Tara Rubin, Merri Sugarman; Waitress – Bernard Telsey, Patrick Goodwin
**New York Theatre – Comedy or Musical**: **Dear Evan Hansen – Tara Rubin, Lindsay Levine**; A Bronx Tale – Tara Rubin, Merri Sugarman; Cirque du Soleil: Paramour – Cesar A. Rocha; Lazarus – Bernard Telsey, Andrew Femenella; The Robber Bridegroom – Jim Carnahan, Stephen Kopel	**New York Theatre – Drama**: **Buried Child – Judy Henderson**; Boy – James Calleri, Erica Jensen; Dada Woof Papa Hot – Daniel Swee; The Effect – Cindy Tolan; The Royale – Daniel Swee
**Regional Theatre East/West**: **Grey Gardens – Duncan Stewart, Benton Whitley**; The 25th Annual Putnam County Spelling Bee – Tara Rubin, Kaitlin Shaw; A Funny Thing Happened on the Way to the Forum – Adam Caldwell; An Intervention – William Cantler, Karyn Casl, Andrew Femenella; A Little Night Music – Alaine Alldaffer; A Moon for the Misbegotten – William Cantler, Karyn Casl, Andrew Femenella	**Los Angeles Theatre**: **Bent – Heidi Levitt**; Barcelona – Phyliss Schuringa; Booty Candy – Jami Rudofsky; Casa Valentina – Jeff Greenberg; Spamalot – Margery Simkin, Michael Donovan
**Special Theatrical Performance**: **Little Shop of Horrors – Carrie Gardner, Stephen Kopel**; 1776 – Jay Binder, Jack Bowman; The Blank Theatre Company's 23rd Annual Young Playwrights Festival – Erica Silverman Bream, Cara Chute Rosenbaum; The Secret Garden – Craig Burns; The Wild Party – Carrie Gardner, Stephen Kopel	**Theatre Tours**: **Beautiful: The Carole King Musical – Stephen Kopel**; The Bridges of Madison County – Cesar A. Rocha; A Gentleman's Guide to Love and Murder – Jason Styres; If/Then – Craig Burns; The Sound of Music – Rachel Hoffman

=== Hoyt Bowers Award ===
- **Nina Gold**

=== Lynn Stalmaster Career Achievement Award ===
- **Annette Bening**

=== Marion Dougherty New York Apple Award ===
- **The Public Theater**
