= BAFTA Award for Best Casting =

British film industry award

- Awarded for: Best Casting
- Country: United Kingdom
- Presented by: British Academy of Film and Television Arts
- Currently held by: Lauren Evans for I Swear (2025)
- Website: https://www.bafta.org/

The BAFTA Award for Best Casting is a film award presented by the British Academy of Film and Television Arts at the annual British Academy Film Awards. It was introduced in the 73rd British Academy Film Awards in 2020.

== History ==
In August 2019, the British Academy of Film and Television Arts announced the introduction of the category. BAFTA chair Pippa Harris said in a statement: "We are delighted this year to be including the highly skilled work of casting directors for the first time. Casting is essential to the screen industries, and vital in terms of promoting diversity and inclusion on screen. We hope this Award will also help to promote an understanding of casting".

In the following lists, the titles and names in bold with a gold background are the winners and recipients respectively; those not in bold are the nominees. The years given are those in which the films under consideration were released, not the year of the ceremony, which always takes place the following year.

== Winners and nominees ==
indicates the winner

=== 2010s ===
Year	Film	Casting director(s)
**2019** (73rd)	**Joker**	**Shayna Markowitz**
**2019** (73rd)	Marriage Story	Douglas Aibel and Francine Maisler
**2019** (73rd)	Once Upon a Time in Hollywood	Victoria Thomas
**2019** (73rd)	The Personal History of David Copperfield	Sarah Crowe
**2019** (73rd)	The Two Popes	Javier Braier, Barbara Giordani, Nina Gold, Francesco Vedovati and Gabriel Villegas

=== 2020s ===
Year	Film	Casting director(s)
**2020** (74th)	**Rocks**	**Lucy Pardee**
**2020** (74th)	Calm with Horses	Shaheen Baig
**2020** (74th)	Judas and the Black Messiah	Alexa L. Fogel
**2020** (74th)	Minari	Julia Kim
**2020** (74th)	Promising Young Woman	Lindsay Graham Ahanonu and Mary Vernieu
**2021** (75th)	**West Side Story**	**Cindy Tolan**
**2021** (75th)	Boiling Point	Carolyn McLeod
**2021** (75th)	Dune	Francine Maisler
**2021** (75th)	The Hand of God	Massimo Appolloni and Annamaria Sambucco
**2021** (75th)	King Richard	Rich Delia and Avy Kaufman
**2022** (76th)	**Elvis**	**Nikki Barrett and Denise Chamian**
**2022** (76th)	Aftersun	Lucy Pardee
**2022** (76th)	All Quiet on the Western Front	Simone Bär
**2022** (76th)	Everything Everywhere All at Once	Sarah Halley Finn
**2022** (76th)	Triangle of Sadness	Pauline Hansson
**2023** (77th)	**The Holdovers**	**Susan Shopmaker**
**2023** (77th)	All of Us Strangers	Kahleen Crawford
**2023** (77th)	Anatomy of a Fall	Cynthia Arra
**2023** (77th)	How to Have Sex	Isabella Odoffin
**2023** (77th)	Killers of the Flower Moon	Ellen Lewis and Rene Haynes
**2024** (78th)	**Anora**	**Sean Baker and Samantha Quan**
**2024** (78th)	The Apprentice	Stephanie Gorin and Carmen Cuba
**2024** (78th)	A Complete Unknown	Yesi Ramirez
**2024** (78th)	Conclave	Nina Gold and Martin Ware
**2024** (78th)	Kneecap	Carla Strange
**2025** (79th)	**I Swear**	**Lauren Evans**
**2025** (79th)	Marty Supreme	Jennifer Venditti
**2025** (79th)	One Battle After Another	Cassandra Kulukundis
**2025** (79th)	Sentimental Value	Yngvill Kolset Haga and Avy Kaufman
**2025** (79th)	Sinners	Francine Maisler

== Multiple nominations ==
3 nominations

- Francine Maisler

2 nominations

- Nina Gold
- Avy Kaufman
- Lucy Pardee
