= Primetime Emmy Award for Outstanding Casting for a Drama Series =

Television award category

Primetime Emmy Award for Casting for a Drama Series
- Awarded for: Outstanding Casting for a Drama Series
- Country: United States
- Presented by: Academy of Television Arts & Sciences
- Currently held by: The Pitt (2026)
- Website: emmys.com

This is a list of the winners and nominations for the Primetime Emmy Award for Outstanding Casting for a Drama Series.

== Winners and nominations ==
=== 1990s ===
| Year | Program | Casting | Network |
|---|---|---|---|
1994 (46th)
| 1994 (46th) | NYPD Blue (Season 1) | Alexa L. Fogel and Junie Lowry-Johnson – casting executives | ABC |
1995 (47th)
| 1995 (47th) | ER (Season 1) | John Frank Levey and Barbara Miller | NBC |
| 1995 (47th) | NYPD Blue (Season 2) | Junie Lowry-Johnson, Alexa L. Fogel, Susan Bluestein and Donna Ekholdt – casting executives | ABC |
1996 (48th)
| 1996 (48th) | Chicago Hope (Season 2) | Debi Manwiller – casting executives | CBS |
1997 (49th)
| 1997 (49th) | ER (Season 3) | John Frank Levey and Barbara Miller | NBC |
1998 (50th)
| 1998 (50th) | Homicide: Life on the Street (Season 6) | Louis DiGiaimo, Pat Moran and Brett Goldstein | NBC |
1999 (51st)
| 1999 (51st) | The Sopranos (Season 1) | Sheila Jaffe and Georgianne Walken – casting executives | HBO |

=== 2000s ===
| Year | Program | Casting | Network |
|---|---|---|---|
2000 (52nd)
| 2000 (52nd) | The West Wing (Season 1) | John Levey, Barbara Miller and Kevin Scott – casting executives | NBC |
| 2000 (52nd) | ER (Season 6) | John Levey and Barbara Miller – casting executives | NBC |
| 2000 (52nd) | Law & Order (Season 10) | Suzanne Ryan – casting executive | NBC |
| 2000 (52nd) | The Practice (Season 3) | Janet Gilmore and Megan McConnell – casting executives | ABC |
| 2000 (52nd) | The Sopranos (Season 2) | Sheila Jaffe and Georgianne Walken – casting executives | HBO |
2001 (53rd)
| 2001 (53rd) | The West Wing (Season 2) | John Levey, Barbara Miller and Kevin Scott – casting executives | NBC |
| 2001 (53rd) | Law & Order (Season 11) | Suzanne Ryan – casting executive | NBC |
| 2001 (53rd) | Once and Again (Season 1) | Amy Lippens and Lizzie Scheck – casting executives | ABC |
| 2001 (53rd) | The Practice (Season 4) | Janet Gilmore and Megan McConnell – casting executives | ABC |
| 2001 (53rd) | The Sopranos (Season 3) | Sheila Jaffe and Georgianne Walken – casting executives | HBO |
2002 (54th)
| 2002 (54th) | Six Feet Under (Seasons 1-2) | Libby Goldstein and Junie Lowry-Johnson – casting by; Julie Tucker – New York casting by | HBO |
| 2002 (54th) | Alias (Season 1) | Janet Gilmore and Megan McConnell – original casting by; April Webster – casting by | ABC |
| 2002 (54th) | Law & Order (Season 12) | Suzanne Ryan – casting by | NBC |
| 2002 (54th) | Once and Again (Season 2) | Amy Lippens – casting by | ABC |
| 2002 (54th) | 24 (Season 1) | Debi Manwiller and Rick Pagano – casting by | Fox |
| 2002 (54th) | The West Wing (Season 3) | Barbara Miller and Anthony Sepulveda – casting by | NBC |
2003 (55th)
| 2003 (55th) | Six Feet Under (Season 3) | Libby Goldstein and Junie Lowry-Johnson – casting by | HBO |
| 2003 (55th) | American Dreams (Season 1) | Laura Adler, Natalie Hart, Jason La Padura and Coreen Mayrs – casting by | NBC |
| 2003 (55th) | The Sopranos (Season 4) | Sheila Jaffe and Georgianne Walken – casting by | HBO |
| 2003 (55th) | 24 (Season 2) | Peggy Kennedy, Debi Manwiller and Rick Pagano – casting by | Fox |
| 2003 (55th) | The West Wing (Season 4) | Barbara Miller and Anthony Sepulveda – casting by | NBC |
2004 (56th)
| 2004 (56th) | 24 (Season 3) | Peggy Kennedy and Debi Manwiller – casting by | Fox |
| 2004 (56th) | Carnivàle (Season 1) | Wendy O'Brien and John Papsidera – casting by | HBO |
| 2004 (56th) | Deadwood (Season 1) | Libby Goldstein and Junie Lowry-Johnson – casting by | HBO |
| 2004 (56th) | The Sopranos (Season 5) | Sheila Jaffe and Georgianne Walken – casting by | HBO |
| 2004 (56th) | The West Wing (Season 5) | Laura Schiff – casting by | NBC |
2005 (57th)
| 2005 (57th) | Lost (Season 1) | Veronica Collins, Mandy Sherman, April Webster and Alyssa Weisberg – casting by | ABC |
| 2005 (57th) | Deadwood (Season 2) | Libby Goldstein and Junie Lowry-Johnson – casting by | HBO |
| 2005 (57th) | Grey's Anatomy (Season 1) | John Brace and Linda Lowy – casting by | ABC |
| 2005 (57th) | House (Season 1) | Amy Lippens – casting by | Fox |
| 2005 (57th) | Nip/Tuck (Season 1) | Eric Dawson, Carol Kritzer and Robert J. Ulrich – casting by | FX |
| 2005 (57th) | 24 (Season 4) | Peggy Kennedy and Debi Manwiller – casting by | Fox |
2006 (58th)
| 2006 (58th) | Grey's Anatomy (Season 2) | John Brace and Linda Lowy – casting by | ABC |
| 2006 (58th) | Big Love (Season 1) | Libby Goldstein and Junie Lowry-Johnson – casting directors | HBO |
| 2006 (58th) | Boston Legal (Season 2) | Ken Miller and Nikki Valko – casting by | ABC |
| 2006 (58th) | House (Season 2) | Stephanie Laffin and Amy Lippens – casting by | Fox |
| 2006 (58th) | Lost (Season 2) | Veronica Collins Rooney, Mandy Sherman and April Webster – casting by | ABC |
2007 (59th)
| 2007 (59th) | Friday Night Lights (Season 1) | Linda Lowy and John Brace – casting by; Beth Sepko – location casting by | NBC |
| 2007 (59th) | Brothers & Sisters (Season 1) | Jeanie Bacharach and Gillian O'Neill – casting directors | ABC |
| 2007 (59th) | Grey's Anatomy (Season 3) | Linda Lowy and John Brace – casting by | ABC |
| 2007 (59th) | Studio 60 on the Sunset Strip (Season 1) | Elizabeth Barnes, Francine Maisler, Meg Liberman and Cami Patton – casting directors | NBC |
| 2007 (59th) | The Tudors (Season 1) | Nuala Moiselle and Frank Moiselle – casting by; Mary Jo Slater and Steve Brooksbank – U.S. casting consultant | Showtime |
2008 (60th)
| 2008 (60th) | Damages (Season 1) | Julie Tucker and Ross Meyerson – casting directors (pilot and series); Avy Kaufman – casting director (pilot) | FX |
| 2008 (60th) | Brothers & Sisters (Season 2) | Jeanie Bacharach and Gillian O'Neill – casting directors | ABC |
| 2008 (60th) | Friday Night Lights (Season 2) | Linda Lowy and John Brace – casting directors; Beth Sepko – Texas casting director | NBC |
| 2008 (60th) | Mad Men (Season 1) | Kim Miscia and Beth Bowling – casting directors (pilot); Laura Schiff and Carrie Audino – casting directors (series) | AMC |
| 2008 (60th) | The Tudors (Season 2) | Nuala Moiselle and Frank Moiselle – casting by; Mary Jo Slater and Steve Brooksbank – U.S. casting by; Stephanie Gorin – Canadian casting by | Showtime |
2009 (61st)
| 2009 (61st) | True Blood (Season 1) | Junie Lowry-Johnson and Libby Goldstein – casting directors | HBO |
| 2009 (61st) | Damages (Season 2) | Julie Tucker and Ross Meyerson – casting by | FX |
| 2009 (61st) | Friday Night Lights (Season 3) | Linda Lowy and John Brace – casting by; Beth Sepko – location casting director (Texas) | DirecTV |
| 2009 (61st) | Mad Men (Season 2) | Laura Schiff and Carrie Audino – casting by | AMC |
| 2009 (61st) | The Tudors (Season 3) | Nuala Moiselle and Frank Moiselle – casting by; Stephanie Gorin – Canadian casting by; Mary Jo Slater and Steve Brooksbank – U.S. casting by | Showtime |

=== 2010s ===
| Year | Program | Casting | Network |
|---|---|---|---|
2010 (62nd)
| 2010 (62nd) | Mad Men (Season 3) | Laura Schiff and Carrie Audino – casting by | AMC |
| 2010 (62nd) | Big Love (Season 4) | Libby Goldstein, Junie Lowry-Johnson and Lisa Soltau – casting directors | HBO |
| 2010 (62nd) | Dexter (Season 4) | Shawn Dawson – casting by | Showtime |
| 2010 (62nd) | Friday Night Lights (Season 4) | Linda Lowy and John Brace – casting directors; Beth Sepko – location casting director (Texas) | DirecTV |
| 2010 (62nd) | The Good Wife (Season 1) | Mark Saks – casting by | CBS |
| 2010 (62nd) | True Blood (Season 2) | Junie Lowry-Johnson and Libby Goldstein – casting directors | HBO |
2011 (63rd)
| 2011 (63rd) | Boardwalk Empire (Season 1) | Ellen Lewis and Meredith Tucker – casting directors | HBO |
| 2011 (63rd) | Game of Thrones (Season 1) | Nina Gold and Robert Sterne – casting directors | HBO |
| 2011 (63rd) | The Good Wife (Season 2) | Mark Saks – casting director | CBS |
| 2011 (63rd) | The Killing (Season 1) | Junie Lowry-Johnson and Libby Goldstein – casting directors; Stuart Aikins, Corrine Clark and Jennifer Page – casting directors (Canada) | AMC |
| 2011 (63rd) | Mad Men (Season 4) | Laura Schiff and Carrie Audino – casting directors | AMC |
2012 (64th)
| 2012 (64th) | Homeland (Season 1) | Junie Lowry-Johnson, Libby Goldstein, Judy Henderson, Craig Fincannon and Lisa Mae Fincannon – casting by | Showtime |
| 2012 (64th) | Boardwalk Empire (Season 2) | Meredith Tucker – casting by | HBO |
| 2012 (64th) | Downton Abbey (Season 2) | Jill Trevellick – casting by | PBS |
| 2012 (64th) | Game of Thrones (Season 2) | Nina Gold and Robert Sterne – casting by | HBO |
| 2012 (64th) | The Good Wife (Season 3) | Mark Saks – casting by | CBS |
| 2012 (64th) | Mad Men (Season 5) | Laura Schiff and Carrie Audino – casting by | AMC |
2013 (65th)
| 2013 (65th) | House of Cards (Season 1) | Laray Mayfield and Julie Schubert – casting directors | Netflix |
| 2013 (65th) | Downton Abbey (Season 3) | Jill Trevellick – casting director | PBS |
| 2013 (65th) | Game of Thrones (Season 3) | Nina Gold and Robert Sterne – casting directors | HBO |
| 2013 (65th) | The Good Wife (Season 4) | Mark Saks – casting director | CBS |
| 2013 (65th) | Homeland (Season 2) | Judy Henderson, Craig Fincannon and Lisa Mae Fincannon – casting directors | Showtime |
2014 (66th)
| 2014 (66th) | True Detective (Season 1) | Alexa L. Fogel, Christine Kromer and Meagan Lewis – casting directors | HBO |
| 2014 (66th) | Breaking Bad (Season 5, Part 2) | Sharon Bialy, Sherry Thomas and Kiira Arai – casting directors | AMC |
| 2014 (66th) | Game of Thrones (Season 4) | Nina Gold and Robert Sterne – casting directors | HBO |
| 2014 (66th) | The Good Wife (Season 5) | Mark Saks – casting director | CBS |
| 2014 (66th) | House of Cards (Season 2) | Laray Mayfield, Julie Schubert – casting directors | Netflix |
2015 (67th)
| 2015 (67th) | Game of Thrones (Season 5) | Nina Gold, Robert Sterne and Carla Stronge – casting directors | HBO |
| 2015 (67th) | Downton Abbey (Season 5) | Jill Trevellick – casting director | PBS |
| 2015 (67th) | House of Cards (Season 3) | Laray Mayfield and Julie Schubert – casting directors | Netflix |
| 2015 (67th) | Mad Men (Season 7, Part 2) | Laura Schiff and Carrie Audino – casting directors | AMC |
| 2015 (67th) | Orange Is the New Black (Season 2) | Jennifer Euston – casting director | Netflix |
2016 (68th)
| 2016 (68th) | Game of Thrones (Season 6) | Nina Gold, Robert Sterne and Carla Stronge – casting directors | HBO |
| 2016 (68th) | Downton Abbey (Season 6) | Jill Trevellick – casting director | PBS |
| 2016 (68th) | House of Cards (Season 4) | Laray Mayfield and Julie Schubert – casting directors | Netflix |
| 2016 (68th) | Mr. Robot (Season 1) | Susie Farris, Beth Bowling and Kim Miscia – casting directors | USA |
| 2016 (68th) | Orange Is the New Black (Season 3) | Jennifer Euston – casting director | Netflix |
2017 (69th)
| 2017 (69th) | Stranger Things (Season 1) | Carmen Cuba – casting director; Tara Feldstein Bennett and Chase Paris – location casting directors | Netflix |
| 2017 (69th) | The Crown (Season 1) | Nina Gold and Robert Sterne – casting directors | Netflix |
| 2017 (69th) | The Handmaid's Tale (Season 1) | Sharon Bialy, Sherry Thomas, Russell Scott – casting directors; and Robin D. Cook – location casting director | Hulu |
| 2017 (69th) | This Is Us (Season 1) | Tiffany Little Canfield and Bernard Telsey – casting directors | NBC |
| 2017 (69th) | Westworld (Season 1) | John Papsidera – casting director | HBO |
2018 (70th)
| 2018 (70th) | The Crown (Season 2) | Nina Gold and Robert Sterne – casting directors | Netflix |
| 2018 (70th) | Game of Thrones (Season 7) | Nina Gold and Robert Sterne – casting directors; Carla Stronge - location casting director | HBO |
| 2018 (70th) | The Handmaid's Tale (Season 2) | Sharon Bialy, Sherry Thomas, Russell Scott – casting directors; and Robin D. Cook – Canadian casting director | Hulu |
| 2018 (70th) | Stranger Things (Season 2) | Carmen Cuba – casting director; Tara Feldstein Bennett and Chase Paris – location casting directors | Netflix |
| 2018 (70th) | Westworld (Season 2) | John Papsidera – casting director | HBO |
2019 (71st)
| 2019 (71st) | Game of Thrones (Season 8) | Nina Gold and Robert Sterne – casting directors; Carla Stronge - location casting director | HBO |
| 2019 (71st) | Killing Eve (Season 2) | Suzanne Crowley and Gilly Poole – casting directors | BBC America |
| 2019 (71st) | Ozark (Season 2) | Alexa L. Fogel – casting director; Tara Feldstein Bennett and Chase Paris – location casting directors | Netflix |
| 2019 (71st) | Pose (Season 1) | Alexa L. Fogel – casting director | FX |
| 2019 (71st) | Succession (Season 1) | Francine Maisler – original casting; Douglas Aibel and Henry Russell Bergstein – casting directors | HBO |

=== 2020s ===
| Year | Program | Casting | Network |
|---|---|---|---|
2020 (72nd)
| 2020 (72nd) | Succession (Season 2) | Avy Kaufman – casting director | HBO |
| 2020 (72nd) | Big Little Lies (Season 2) | David Rubin – casting director | HBO |
| 2020 (72nd) | The Crown (Season 3) | Nina Gold and Robert Sterne – casting directors | Netflix |
| 2020 (72nd) | The Handmaid's Tale (Season 3) | Sharon Bialy, Sherry Thomas and Russell Scott – casting directors; Robin D. Cook – Canadian casting director | Hulu |
| 2020 (72nd) | Killing Eve (Season 3) | Suzanne Crowley and Gilly Poole – casting directors | BBC America |
| 2020 (72nd) | Ozark (Season 3) | Alexa L. Fogel – casting director; Tara Feldstein Bennett and Chase Paris – location casting directors | Netflix |
2021 (73rd)
| 2021 (73rd) | The Crown (Season 4) | Robert Sterne – casting director | Netflix |
| 2021 (73rd) | Bridgerton (Season 1) | Kelly Valentine Hendry – casting director | Netflix |
| 2021 (73rd) | The Handmaid's Tale (Season 4) | Sharon Bialy, Sherry Thomas and Russell Scott – casting directors; Robin D. Cook – Canadian casting director | Hulu |
| 2021 (73rd) | Lovecraft Country (Season 1) | Kim Taylor-Coleman – casting director, Meagan Lewis – location casting director | HBO |
| 2021 (73rd) | The Mandalorian (Season 2) | Sarah Halley Finn – casting director | Disney+ |
2022 (74th)
| 2022 (74th) | Succession (Season 3) | Avy Kaufman – casting director; Francine Maisler – original casting director | HBO |
| 2022 (74th) | Euphoria (Season 2) | Jessica Kelly, Mary Vernieu and Bret Howe – casting directors; Jennifer Venditti, original/location casting director | HBO |
| 2022 (74th) | Ozark (Season 4) | Alexa L. Fogel – casting director; Tara Feldstein Bennett and Chase Paris – location casting directors | Netflix |
| 2022 (74th) | Severance (Season 1) | Rachel Tenner – casting director; Bess Fifer – location casting director | Apple TV+ |
| 2022 (74th) | Stranger Things (Season 4: Part 1) | Carmen Cuba – casting director; Tara Feldstein Bennett and Chase Paris – location casting directors | Netflix |
| 2022 (74th) | Yellowjackets (Season 1) | Junie Lowry-Johnson and Libby Goldstein – casting directors; Corinne Clark and Jennifer Page – location casting directors | Showtime |
2023 (75th)
| 2023 (75th) | The White Lotus (Season 2) | Meredith Tucker – casting director; Francesco Vedovati and Barbara Giordani – location casting directors | HBO |
| 2023 (75th) | Bad Sisters (Season 1) | Nina Gold and Lucy Amos – casting directors | Apple TV+ |
| 2023 (75th) | The Crown (Season 5) | Robert Sterne – casting director | Netflix |
| 2023 (75th) | The Last of Us (Season 1) | Victoria Thomas– casting director; Corinne Clark and Jennifer Page – location casting directors | HBO |
| 2023 (75th) | Succession (Season 4) | Avy Kaufman – casting director | HBO |
| 2023 (75th) | Yellowjackets (Season 2) | Junie Lowry Johnson and Libby Goldstein – casting directors; Corinne Clark and Jennifer Page – location casting directors | Showtime |
2024 (76th)
| 2024 (76th) | Shōgun (Season 1) | Laura Schiff and Carrie Audino – casting directors; Kei Kawamura, Maureen Webb and Colleen Bolton – location casting directors | FX |
| 2024 (76th) | The Crown (Season 6) | Robert Sterne – casting director | Netflix |
| 2024 (76th) | The Morning Show (Season 3) | Victoria Thomas – casting director | Apple TV+ |
| 2024 (76th) | Mr. & Mrs. Smith (Season 1) | Carmen Cuba – casting director; Candice Alustiza-Lee, Teresa Razzauti and Alejandro Reza – location casting directors | Prime Video |
| 2024 (76th) | Slow Horses (Season 3) | Nina Gold – casting director | Apple TV+ |
2025 (77th)
| 2025 (77th) | The Pitt (Season 1) | Cathy Sandrich Gelfond and Erica Berger – casting directors | HBO Max |
| 2025 (77th) | The Last of Us (Season 2) | Mary Vernieu, Lindsay Graham Ahanonu and Sydney Shircliff – casting directors; Corinne Clark and Jennifer Page – location casting directors | HBO |
| 2025 (77th) | Severance (Season 2) | Rachel Tenner – casting director; Bess Fifer – location casting director | Apple TV+ |
| 2025 (77th) | Slow Horses (Season 4) | Nina Gold and Melissa Gethin Clarke – casting directors | Apple TV+ |
| 2025 (77th) | The White Lotus (Season 3) | Meredith Tucker – casting director; Non Jungmeier – location casting director | HBO |
2026 (78th)
| 2026 (78th) | The Pitt (Season 2) | Cathy Sandrich Gelfond and Erica Berger – casting directors; Seth Caskey – associate casting director | HBO Max |
| 2026 (78th) | The Diplomat (Season 3) | Julie Schubert – casting director; Lain Kunin and Ellinor Isherwood – associate casting directors; Lucinda Syson and Natasha Vincent – location casting directors | Netflix |
| 2026 (78th) | Paradise (Season 2) | Tiffany Little Canfield and Josh Einsohn – casting directors; Brian Sutow – associate casting director | Hulu |
| 2026 (78th) | Pluribus (Season 1) | Sharon Bialy, Sherry Thomas and Russell Scott – casting directors; Marie A.K. McMaster – location casting director | Apple TV |
| 2026 (78th) | Slow Horses (Season 5) | Nina Gold and Melissa Gethin Clarke – casting directors | Apple TV |

== Multiple wins ==
6 wins

- Junie Lowry-Johnson (2 consecutive, twice)

5 wins

- Robert Sterne (2 consecutive)

4 wins

- Nina Gold (2 consecutive, twice)
- Libby Goldstein (2 consecutive)
- John Frank Levey (2 consecutive)
- Barbara Miller (2 consecutive)

3 wins

- Alexa L. Fogel (2 consecutive)
- Avy Kaufman
- Carla Stronge (2 consecutive)

2 wins

- Carrie Audino
- John Brace (consecutive)
- Erica Berger (2 consecutive)
- Cathy Sandrich Gelfond (2 consecutive)
- Linda Lowy (consecutive)
- Debi Manwiller
- Laura Schiff
- Kevin Scott (consecutive)
- Julie Tucker
- Meredith Tucker

== Programs with multiple wins ==
3 wins

- Game of Thrones

2 wins

- The Crown
- ER
- NYPD Blue
- The Pitt (consecutive)
- Six Feet Under
- Succession
- The West Wing (consecutive)

== Casting directors with multiple nominations ==
16 nominations

- Junie Lowry-Johnson

15 nominations

- Nina Gold

14 nominations

- Robert Stern

12 nominations

- Libby Goldstein

9 nominations

- Barbara Miller

8 nominations

- Laura Schiff

7 nominations

- Carrie Audino
- John Brace
- Alexa L. Fogel
- Linda Lowy
- John Frank Levey

6 nominations

- Tara Feldstein Bennett
- Sharon Bialy
- Chase Paris
- Sherry Thomas

5 nominations

- Corinne Clark
- Carmen Cuba
- Sheila Jaffe
- Debi Manwiller
- Jennifer Page
- Suzanne Ryan
- Mark Saks
- Julie Schubert
- Russell Scott
- Georgianne Walken

4 nominations

- Robin D. Cook
- Avy Kaufman
- Laray Mayfield
- Beth Sepko
- Carla Stronge
- Jill Trevellick
- Meredith Tucker

3 nominations

- Steve Brooksbank
- Louis DiGiaimo
- Brett Goldstein
- Peggy Kennedy
- Francine Maisler
- Frank Moiselle
- Nuala Moiselle
- Pat Moran
- Richard Pagano
- John Papsidera
- Mary Jo Slater
- Victoria Thomas
- Julie Tucker
- April Webster

2 nominations

- Jeanie Bacharach
- Erica Berger
- Beth Bowling
- Tiffany Little Canfield
- Suzanne Crowley
- Jennifer Euston
- Bess Fifer
- Craig Fincannon
- Lisa Mae Fincannon
- Cathy Sandrich Gelfond
- Stephanie Gorin
- Judy Henderson
- Meagan Lewis
- Ross Meyerson
- Kim Miscia
- Gillian O'Neill
- Gilly Poole
- Veronica Collins Rooney
- Mandy Sherman
- Kevin Scott
- Anthony Sepulveda
- Rachel Tenner
- Victoria Thomas

== Programs with multiple nominations ==
8 nominations

- Game of Thrones

6 nominations

- The Crown
- Mad Men

5 nominations

- The Good Wife
- The Sopranos
- The West Wing

4 nominations

- 24
- Downton Abbey
- Friday Night Lights
- The Handmaid's Tale
- House of Cards
- Succession

3 nominations

- ER
- Grey's Anatomy
- Law & Order
- Ozark
- Slow Horses
- Stranger Things
- The Tudors

2 nominations

- Big Love
- Boardwalk Empire
- Brothers & Sisters
- Damages
- Deadwood
- Homeland
- House
- Killing Eve
- The Last of Us
- Lost
- NYPD Blue
- Once and Again
- Orange Is the New Black
- Severance
- Six Feet Under
- The Practice
- The Pitt
- True Blood
- Westworld
- The White Lotus
- Yellowjackets

== Total awards by network ==
- HBO – 11
- NBC – 6
- ABC / Netflix– 4
- FX– 2
- AMC / CBS / Fox / HBO Max / Showtime– 1
