= David Huffman =

American actor (1945–1985)

- Born: May 10, 1945; Berwyn, Illinois, U.S.
- Died: February 27, 1985 (aged 39); San Diego, California, U.S.
- Cause of death: Homicide
- Occupations: Actor and producer
- Years active: 1969–1985
- Spouse: Phyllis Huffman (m. 1967)
- Children: 2

David Oliver Huffman (May 10, 1945 – February 27, 1985) was an American actor and producer.

== Personal life ==
Huffman was born on May 10, 1945, in Berwyn, Illinois, to Clarence and Opal Huffman (née Dippel).

Huffman married casting director Phyllis Huffman (nee Grennan) in 1967, whom he had met as a student at Webster University in St. Louis, Missouri. The couple had two sons and remained married until Huffman's death in 1985.

Huffman was an avid sailor, recreational painter, and country‐and‐western guitarist.

== Murder ==
On the morning of February 27, 1985, 16-year-old Genaro Samano Villanueva was taken into San Diego police custody after attempting to steal a radio from a car near his home. Released into the custody of his high school vice principal, Villanueva left school and went to Balboa Park. There he was spotted by Canadian tourist Jack Beamer prowling around inside the motor home of Beamer's friends. After Beamer accosted him, Villanueva fled the scene.

Huffman, who was cast in the play Of Mice and Men at the Old Globe Theatre and was set to begin work on the television miniseries North and South the following week, had visited the theatre shortly before noon to share cookies with the cast and crew and was sitting in his van near the theatre playing his bagpipes when he saw Beamer confront Villanueva. He gave chase in his vehicle, parking the van near the Spreckels Organ Pavilion and following Villanueva into the park. When he caught up with Villanueva, the two became involved in a physical altercation, during which Villanueva stabbed Huffman twice in the chest with a screwdriver. Huffman died of exsanguination, likely within 30 to 45 seconds. His body was found less than an hour later in a Palm Canyon crevice by a group of children, although it was not positively identified until later that night.

On March 2 and 3, Crime Stoppers produced a reenactment of the crime that was shown on San Diego television and published in several national newspapers. The Canadian tourists whose motor home was burglarized saw Huffman's photo and death announcement in the newspaper and called police.

Villanueva was arrested on March 12 after a police officer recognized Villanueva from a composite sketch given to police by the Canadian tourist. On June 24, 1986, Villanueva was sentenced to 26 years to life in prison and admitted to the California State Prison, Centinela. On December 9, 2011, he was denied parole for 15 years.

== Broadway stage credits ==
- Butterflies Are Free as Don Baker (October 21, 1969 – July 2, 1972)

== Filmography ==
Film
Year	Title	Role	Notes
1978	F.I.S.T.	Abe Belkin	
1978	Ice Castles	Brian Dockett	
1979	The Onion Field	District Attorney Phil Halpin	
1980	Leo and Loree	Dennis	
1981	Wolf Lake	David	
1981	Blood Beach	Harry Caulder	
1981	St Helens	David Jackson	
1982	Firefox	Captain Buckholz	
1983	Last Plane Out	Jim Conley	

Television
Year	Title	Role	Notes
1973	Pueblo	Seaman	Television movie
1973	Love Story	David Ross	Episode: "Mirabelle's Summer"
1974	F. Scott Fitzgerald and 'The Last of the Belles'	Andy McKenna	Television movie
1974	The Yanks Are Coming	Unknown	Television movie
1974	Lincoln	Elmer E. Ellsworth	Miniseries
1974	Police Story	T. Byron Bentley	Episode: "A Dangerous Age"
1974	Nakia	Unknown	Episode: "The Hostage"
1974	The Gun	Wayne	ABC Movie of the Week
1976	Eleanor and Franklin	Elliott Roosevelt (socialite)	Television movie
1976	Baretta	Jesse Bryant	Episode: "The Blood Bond"
1976	Bert D'Angelo/Superstar	Unknown	Episode: "A Noise in the Street"
1976	Amelia Earhart	Radio Operator	Miniseries
1976	Look What's Happened to Rosemary's Baby	Peter Simon	Television movie
1976	Captains and the Kings	Sean Armagh	Miniseries
1977	Play of the Month	Chadwick Newsome	Episode: "The Ambassadors"
1977	Testimony of Two Men	Harold Ferrier	Miniseries
1977	In the Matter of Karen Ann Quinlan	Paul Armstrong	Television movie
1978	The Winds of Kitty Hawk	Orville Wright	Television movie
1979	Tom Edison: The Boy Who Lit Up the World	Tom Edison	Television movie
1979	Lou Grant	Daniel Todson	Episode: "Hype"
1980	Baby Comes Home	Jeff Winston	Television movie Producer
1981	The Million Dollar Face	Christopher Ward	Television movie
1981	Sidney Shorr: A Girl's Best Friend	Jimmy	Television movie
1982	Little House on the Prairie	Reverend Addison Hale	Episode: "Alden's Dilemma"
1983	Jane Doe	David	Television movie
1983	Remington Steele	Wilson Jeffries	Episode: "Vintage Steele"
1983	Trapper John, M.D.	Barry Laughton / Frank Maxwyn	2 episodes
1983	Sparkling Cyanide	Stephan Farraday	Television movie
1984	T. J. Hooker	Dr. Don Travers	Episode: "The Lipstick Killer"
1984	The Mississippi	Harley Morhaim	Episode: "Going Back to Hannibal"
1984	Newhart	Ted Kingston	Episode: "Cats"
1984	When She Says No	Carl Jerome	Television movie
1984	Children in the Crossfire	Larry Malone	Television movie, (final film role)
