= The Winds of Kitty Hawk =

1978 television film by E. W. Swackhamer

- Written by: William Kelley; Jeb Rosebrook
- Directed by: E.W. Swackhamer
- Starring: Michael Moriarty; David Huffman; Tom Bower; Scott Hylands
- Music by: Charles Bernstein
- Country of origin: United States
- Original language: English

Production
- Executive producer: Charles Fries
- Producer: Lawrence Schiller
- Cinematography: Dennis Dalzell
- Editor: John A. Martinelli
- Running time: 98 minutes
- Production company: Charles Fries Productions

Original release
- Network: NBC
- Release: December 17, 1978

The Winds of Kitty Hawk is a 1978 American made-for-television biographical film directed by E. W. Swackhamer about the Wright brothers and their invention of the first successful powered heavier-than-air flying machine, the Wright Flyer. The film was broadcast on December 17, 1978, the 75th anniversary of the famous 1903 first aeroplane flight. It is one of several made-for-television films about historical people in aviation produced in the 1970s, including The Amazing Howard Hughes, Amelia Earhart, and The Lindbergh Kidnapping Case.

== Premise ==
The film presents the brothers' lives in dramatic vignettes sometimes historically rearranged.

At the start of the 20th century, bicycle mechanics Wilbur and Orville Wright, begin tinkering with gliders on the windy sand dunes of Kitty Hawk. Three years and dozens of crashes later, the Wright brothers solve the technical problems that had stumped the best engineers in the world, and succeed in making the first successful powered flight. Ironically, their success marks only the beginning and not the end of their struggle.

The film makes a disclaimer message at the beginning stating that dramatic license had been taken but that for the most part their story is told chronologically.

== Home media ==
In 2012, the film became available on DVD from MGM Limited Edition.

== Cast ==
- Michael Moriarty as Wilbur Wright
- David Huffman as Orville Wright
- Tom Bower as William Tate
- Robin Gammell as H.A. Toulmin
- Scott Hylands as Glenn Curtiss
- John Randolph as Alexander Graham Bell
- Kathryn Walker as Katharine Wright
- Eugene Roche as Bishop Milton Wright
- John Hoyt - Professor Samuel Langley
- Joseph Bernard - Mayor of New York, George B. McClellan Jr.
- Lew Brown - Harlan Mumford (banker)
- Carole Tru Foster - Agnes Osborne
- Dabbs Greer - Ace Hutchin
- Mo Malone - Elizabeth Mayfield
- Robert Casper - Man
- Tom Lawrence - Doctor
- Ross Durfee - William Howard Taft
- Charles Macaulay - 2nd General
- Frank Farmer - Mr. Newell
- Steffen Zacharias - Fisherman
- Laurence Haddon - 1st General
- Ari Zeltzer - Tom Tate
- Vaughn Armstrong - Reporter
- Marie Todd -
- Gerald Berns - Reporter

== See also ==
- Wright Flyer
- The Wright Brothers (1971 film)
