= Sarah Halley Finn =

American casting director and producer

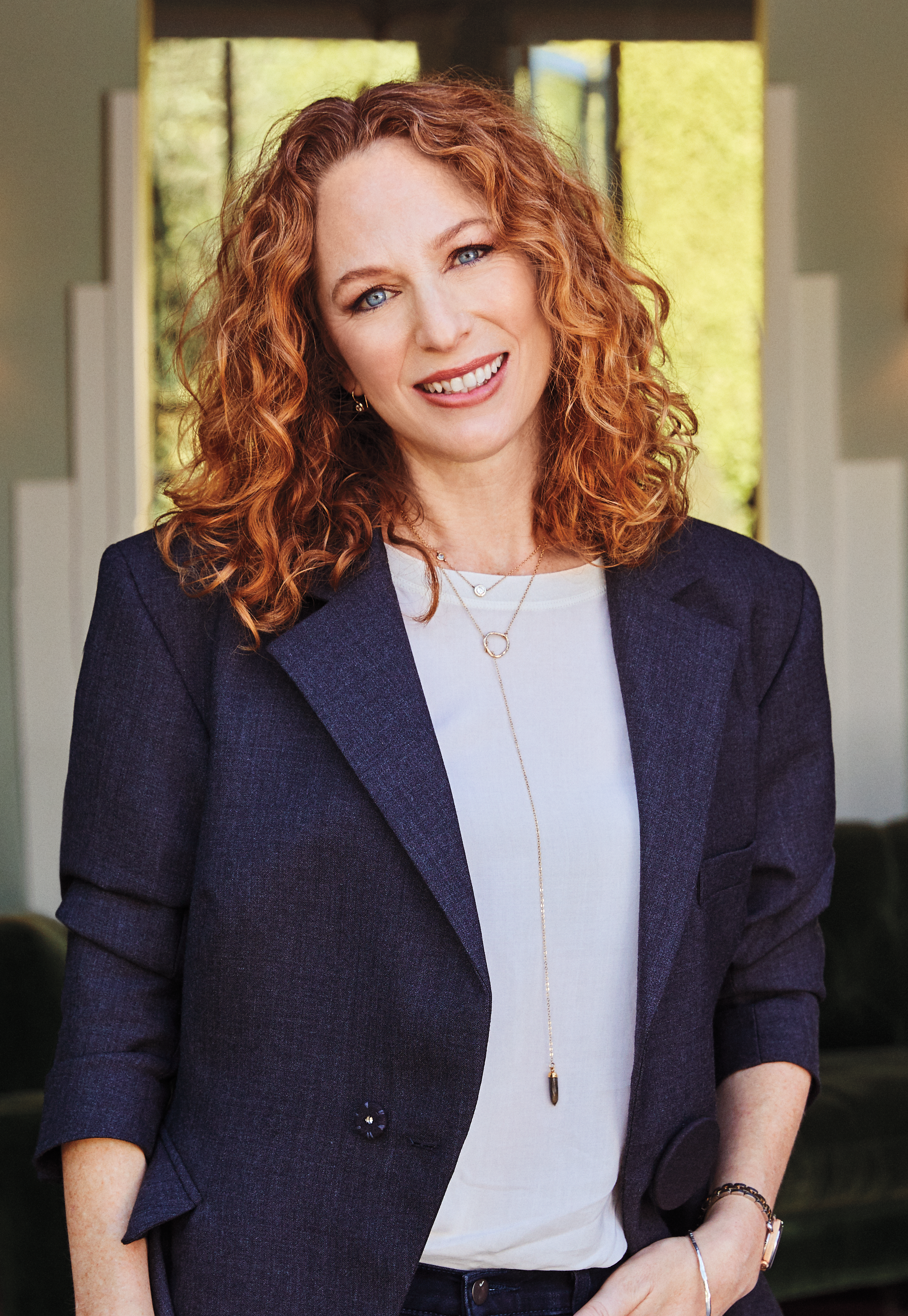
- Education: Yale University (BA)
- Occupations: Casting director; Producer
- Years active: 1997–present

Sarah Halley Finn is an American casting director and producer. Finn has cast over 150 feature films and is best known for casting the entire Marvel Cinematic Universe (except 2008's The Incredible Hulk), the most successful film franchise of all time.

She also cast and co-produced Oscar winning Best Picture Everything Everywhere All at Once, the most awarded film in movie history. It won three out of four acting categories at the 95th Academy Awards: Best Actress, Best Supporting Actor, and Best Supporting Actress – a feat only achieved twice before, and not since 1976. The film also holds the record for most Screen Actors Guild Award wins for a single film.

Other works include Oscar-winning films Black Panther; Three Billboards Outside Ebbing, Missouri; and Crash; all of which earned Finn the Casting Society of America’s highest honor, the Artios Award for Outstanding Achievement in Casting. Those films also won the prestigious SAG Award for Outstanding Performance by a Cast in a Motion Picture. In 2023 Finn was nominated for the BAFTA Award for Best Casting and won the Artios Zeitgeist award for her work on Everything Everywhere All At Once. In 2022, she received two Primetime Emmy nominations for her work casting WandaVision and The Mandalorian.

== Career ==
Finn's collaboration with Marvel Studios includes 38 films and 18 shows to date. In 2006, she was hired to cast the first Marvel Cinematic Universe (MCU) film, Iron Man, and cast Robert Downey Jr. in the titular role. The president of Marvel Studios, Kevin Feige, has said "For all of our success in all of the films, it comes down to characters... The reason you care about those characters is because of the actors who portray them, and the reason those actors portray them is because at some point, Sarah Finn brought them to our attention.” Jac Schaeffer, who Finn collaborated with on the Emmy nominated WandaVision and later Agatha All Along, said, "[Sarah] has such incredible instincts... [She] is really great at internalizing the writer's intention and then finding a new flavor for that: something that's unexpected for the audience and will feel special or unique." Finn fought for Chris Pratt to land the role of Peter Quill, pushed for Chris Hemsworth as Thor after his initial audition was rejected by higher-ups, and, after observing his powerful and king-like presence during a prior audition for Drax the Destroyer, knew to highlight Chadwick Boseman for the role of T'Challa in Black Panther.

Finn is also accustomed to finding unknown actors to fill roles in the MCU. After a lengthy, nationwide search and several rounds of auditions to find a Pakistani-Muslim teenager to play Ms. Marvel, then high school senior Iman Vellani won the role. When asked about her experience being cast, Vellani said, "[Finn] looked out for me in a way that I didn't think was normal for most casting directors... She would literally call me and run lines with me and give me notes [before auditions]... Even after I got the part, I was dealing with so much imposter syndrome, and her advice is what grounded me and allowed me to trust my instincts.” Similarly, Dominique Thorne (MCU's Ironheart) described Finn as an "advocate of mine, supporting me and what I was doing."

Beyond Marvel, Finn cast the Star Wars series The Mandalorian and its continuation film The Mandalorian and Grogu (2026), created by Jon Favreau and Dave Filoni for Lucasfilm. She also cast The Book of Boba Fett, Skeleton Crew, and Ahsoka . Outside of Star Wars, Finn cast all the feature films within the Monsterverse, starting with Godzilla in 2014, and most recently Godzilla x Kong: Supernova, which is set for release in March 2027.

Some of Finn's upcoming credits include Martin McDonagh's Wild Horse Nine, and the biographic drama Ibelin, from Oscar Award winning production company Vendôme Pictures, and Oscar nominated director Morten Tyldum. Past credits include: Jon Favreau's comedy, Chef; Oliver Stone's drama, Wall Street: Money Never Sleeps; Martin McDonagh’s Seven Psychopaths and Shane Black’s The Nice Guys; sports films Miracle, Coach Carter, She's the Man, and Blue Crush; animated films The Little Prince, The Jungle Book (2016), and The Lion King (2019); and action films such as Fast & Furious and Kick-Ass.

A graduate of theater and history at Yale University and member of AMPAS (Executive Committee, Casting Branch), Finn has served on the Executive Board of Women in Film (WIF) and is on the Board of Advisors for the Master Class educational series. She is also a member of the Ensemble Studio Theatre.

== Awards and nominations ==
Select awards and nominations
Awards and nominations
Award	Wins	Nominations
BAFTA	0	1
Emmy Awards	0	2
BIFA	0	1
Children's and Family Emmy Awards	0	1
CSA Artios Awards	6	19
HCA Awards	0	1

Totals (Note: Certain award groups do not simply award one winner. They acknowledge several different recipients, have runners-up, and have third place. Since this is a specific recognition and is different from losing an award, runner-up mentions are considered wins in this award tally. For simplification and to avoid errors, each award in this list has been presumed to have had a prior nomination.)
- Wins: 6
- Nominations: 24

In 2023, Finn garnered a BAFTA nomination for Best Casting as well as a Hollywood Critics Association Award nomination in recognition of her work on Everything Everywhere All at Once. In 2021, Finn was nominated for two Primetime Emmy Awards: Outstanding Casting for a Limited or Anthology Series or Movie (WandaVision) and Outstanding Casting for a Drama Series (The Mandalorian). In 2026, Finn also earned a Children's and Family Emmy Award nomination for Outstanding Casting for a Live-Action Program for Skeleton Crew. She has also been nominated numerous times by the Casting Society of America, winning for The Lion King, Crash, Three Billboards Outside Ebbing, Missouri, Black Panther, Spider-Man: No Way Home, and Everything Everywhere All At Once.

== Filmography ==
=== Film ===
Year	Title	Casting director	Producer	Notes
1998	Paulie	Yes	No	
1999	Varsity Blues	Yes	No	
1999	200 Cigarettes	Yes	No	
1999	Double Jeopardy	Yes	No	
2000	Mission: Impossible II	Yes	No	
2001	Lara Croft: Tomb Raider	Yes	No	
2001	Life as a House	Yes	No	Nominated – Artios Award for Best Casting for Feature Film, Drama
2001	Crazy/Beautiful	Yes	No	Nominated – Artios Award for Best Casting for Feature Film, Drama
2002	The Scorpion King	Yes	No	
2002	Blue Crush	Yes	No	
2002	You Stupid Man	Yes	No	
2003	Terminator 3: Rise of the Machines	Yes	No	
2003	S.W.A.T.	Yes	No	
2004	Miracle	Yes	No	
2004	Walking Tall	Yes	No	
2004	A Cinderella Story	Yes	No	
2004	Crash	Yes	Co-producer	Won – Artios Award for Best Casting for Feature Film, Drama; Won – Black Reel Award for Best Ensemble
2005	Coach Carter	Yes	No	
2005	Marilyn Hotchkiss’ Ballroom Dancing & Charm School	Yes	Co-producer	Nominated – Artios Award for Best Independent Feature Film Casting
2005	Ice Princess	Yes	No	
2005	Dreamer	Yes	No	
2006	She's the Man	Yes	No	
2006	The Fast and the Furious: Tokyo Drift	Yes	No	
2006	The Guardian	Yes	No	
2006	Home of the Brave	Yes	No	
2007	In the Valley of Elah	Yes	No	
2008	Quid Pro Quo	Yes	Co-producer	
2008	Vantage Point	Yes	No	
2008	Never Back Down	Yes	No	
2008	Iron Man	Yes	No	Nominated – Artios Award for Outstanding Achievement in Casting - Studio Feature - Drama
2008	W.	Yes	No	
2009	Hotel for Dogs	Yes	No	
2009	Race to Witch Mountain	Yes	No	
2009	Fast & Furious	Yes	No	
2009	Couples Retreat	Yes	No	Nominated – Artios Award for Outstanding Achievement in Casting - Big Budget Feature - Comedy
2010	Kick-Ass	Yes	No	Nominated – Artios Award for Outstanding Achievement in Casting - Feature - Studio or Independent Comedy
2010	Iron Man 2	Yes	No	
2010	Wall Street: Money Never Sleeps	Yes	No	
2010	Tron: Legacy	Yes	No	
2011	Thor	Yes	No	
2011	Captain America: The First Avenger	Yes	No	
2011	Cowboys & Aliens	Yes	No	
2012	Safe House	Yes	No	
2012	The Avengers	Yes	No	
2012	Seven Psychopaths	Yes	No	Nominated – Artios Award for Outstanding Achievement in Casting - Studio or Independent Feature - Comedy
2013	Iron Man 3	Yes	No	
2013	Thor: The Dark World	Yes	No	
2014	Chef	Yes	No	Nominated – Artios Award for Outstanding Achievement in Casting - Studio or Independent Feature - Comedy
2014	Captain America: The Winter Soldier	Yes	No	
2014	Godzilla	Yes	No	
2014	Guardians of the Galaxy	Yes	No	Nominated – Artios Award for Outstanding Achievement in Casting - Big Budget Feature - Comedy
2014	As Above, So Below	Yes	No	
2015	Avengers: Age of Ultron	Yes	No	
2015	The Little Prince	Yes	No	Nominated – Artios Award for Outstanding Achievement in Casting - Animation Feature
2015	Ant-Man	Yes	No	
2016	The Jungle Book	Yes	No	Nominated – Artios Award for Outstanding Achievement in Casting - Animation Feature
2016	Captain America: Civil War	Yes	No	
2016	The Nice Guys	Yes	No	
2016	Doctor Strange	Yes	No	
2017	Kong: Skull Island	Yes	No	
2017	Guardians of the Galaxy Vol. 2	Yes	No	Nominated – Artios Award for Outstanding Achievement in Casting - Big Budget Feature - Comedy
2017	Spider-Man: Homecoming	Yes	No	
2017	Three Billboards Outside Ebbing, Missouri	Yes	No	Won – Artios Award for Outstanding Achievement in Casting - Studio or Independent Feature - Drama; Nominated – British Independent Film Award for Best Casting
2017	Thor: Ragnarok	Yes	No	
2018	Black Panther	Yes	No	Won – Artios Zeitgeist Award
2018	Pacific Rim: Uprising	Yes	No	
2018	Avengers: Infinity War	Yes	No	
2018	Ant-Man and the Wasp	Yes	No	
2018	Skyscraper	Yes	No	
2018	The Predator	Yes	No	
2019	Captain Marvel	Yes	No	
2019	Avengers: Endgame	Yes	No	
2019	Pokémon: Detective Pikachu	Yes	No	
2019	Godzilla: King of the Monsters	Yes	No	
2019	Spider-Man: Far From Home	Yes	No	
2019	The Lion King	Yes	No	Won – Artios Award for Outstanding Achievement in Casting - Animation Feature
2019	Dora and the Lost City of Gold	Yes	No	
2019	Mosul	Yes	No	
2021	Godzilla vs. Kong	Yes	No	
2021	Black Widow	Yes	No	
2021	Shang-Chi and the Legend of the Ten Rings	Yes	No	Nominated – Artios Award for Outstanding Achievement in Casting - Big Budget Feature - Comedy
2021	Eternals	Yes	No	
2021	Spider-Man: No Way Home	Yes	No	Won – Artios Zeitgeist Award
2022	Everything Everywhere All at Once	Yes	Co-producer	Won – SAG Award for Outstanding Cast; Won – SAG Award for Best Actress; Won – SAG Award for Best Supporting Actress; Won – SAG Award for Best Supporting Actor; Won – Artios Zeitgeist Award; Won – Hollywood Critics Association for Best Casting Director; Nominated – BAFTA Award for Best Casting; Nominated – Black Reel Award for Outstanding Ensemble
2022	Doctor Strange in the Multiverse of Madness	Yes	No	
2022	Thor: Love and Thunder	Yes	No	
2022	The Gray Man	Yes	No	
2022	Black Panther: Wakanda Forever	Yes	No	Nominated – Artios Award for Outstanding Achievement in Casting - Big Budget Feature - Drama
2023	One True Loves	Yes	Yes	
2023	Ant-Man and the Wasp: Quantumania	Yes	No	
2023	Guardians of the Galaxy Vol. 3	Yes	No	
2023	The Marvels	Yes	No	
2024	Deadpool & Wolverine	Yes	No	
2025	Captain America: Brave New World	Yes	No	
2025	The Electric State	Yes	No	
2025	Thunderbolts*	Yes	No	
2025	The Fantastic Four: First Steps	Yes	No	
2025	Play Dirty	Yes	No	
2026	The Bluff	Yes	Executive producer	
2026	Star Wars: The Mandalorian and Grogu	Yes	No	
2026	Spider-Man: Brand New Day	Yes	No	
2026	Wild Horse Nine	Yes	No	
2026	Avengers: Doomsday	Yes	No	
2027	Godzilla x Kong: Supernova	Yes	No	
2027	Avengers: Secret Wars	Yes	No	
TBA	Ibelin	Yes	No	
TBA	The Kellys	Yes	No	

=== Television ===
Year	Title	Casting director	Producer	No. of episodes	Notes
2015	Agent Carter	Yes	No	8 episodes	
2018	Deadly Class	Yes	No	1 episode	
2019–20	Emergence	Yes	No	9 episodes	
2013–20	Agents of S.H.I.E.L.D.	Yes	No	100 episodes	
2019–23	The Mandalorian	Yes	Consulting producer	24 episodes	Nominated – Primetime Emmy Award for Outstanding Casting for a Drama Series; Nominated – Artios Award for Outstanding Achievement in Casting - Television Pilot and First Season - Drama; Nominated – Artios Award for Outstanding Achievement in Casting - Television Series - Drama
2021	WandaVision	Yes	Consulting producer	9 episodes	Nominated – Primetime Emmy Award for Outstanding Casting for a Limited or Anthology Series or Movie; Nominated – Artios Award for Outstanding Achievement in Casting - Limited Series
2021	The Falcon and the Winter Soldier	Yes	Consulting producer	6 episodes	
2021–23	Loki	Yes	Consulting producer	12 episodes (as CD), 12 episodes (as consulting producer)	
2021–23	What If...?	Yes	Consulting producer	8 episodes (as CD), 9 episodes (as consulting producer)	
2021	Hawkeye	Yes	Consulting producer	6 episodes	
2021–22	The Book of Boba Fett	Yes	Consulting producer	7 episodes	
2022	Moon Knight	Yes	Consulting producer	6 episodes (as CD), 3 episodes (as consulting producer)	
2022	The First Lady	Yes	Consulting producer	5 episodes	
2022	Ms. Marvel	Yes	No	6 episodes	
2022	She-Hulk: Attorney at Law	Yes	No	9 episodes	
2022	Werewolf by Night	Yes	Consulting producer	TV special	
2022	The Guardians of the Galaxy Holiday Special	Yes	Consulting producer	TV special	
2023	Secret Invasion	Yes	No	6 episodes	
2023–present	Star Wars: Ahsoka	Yes	Consulting producer	8 episodes	
2024	Echo	Yes	Consulting producer	5 episodes	
2024	Agatha All Along	Yes	Consulting producer	9 episodes	
2024–25	Star Wars: Skeleton Crew	Yes	Consulting producer	8 episodes	
2025	Ironheart	Yes	Consulting producer	6 episodes	
TBA	Southern Bastards	Yes	No	Pilot	
