= Howard Feuer =

American casting director

- Born: November 30, 1948
- Died: December 20, 2004 (aged 56); Bergen County, New Jersey

Howard Feuer (November 30, 1948 – December 20, 2004) was an American casting director known for casting theatrical productions and hit movies.

His casting career began on Broadway as an assistant to producer Jerry Schlossberg on the 1971 revival of On the Town. From then until 1986, he cast another 29 productions, often in conjunction with Jeremy Ritzer. His credits include: Noises Off, Benefactors, Wild Honey, 42nd Street, Barnum and Oh! Calcutta!

He also cast over 75 films, beginning with The Warriors (1979). He won the Casting Society of America's Artios Award for Feature Film Casting - Comedy three times, for Moonstruck (1988), The Fisher King (1991), and That Thing You Do! (1996), and twice for Drama, Mississippi Burning (1988, shared with Juliet Taylor) and Dead Poets Society (1989). He was also nominated for Married to the Mob (1988), Reversal of Fortune (1990), The Silence of the Lambs (1991), Philadelphia (1993), The Ref (1994) and What Women Want (2000, shared with Deborah Aquila). During casting for That Thing You Do!, he yelled that "I've got a young Kim Novak in the room!" when then-unknown Charlize Theron auditioned for (and landed) a part. He also received a nomination for the miniseries The Murder of Mary Phagan.

He died of colon cancer on December 20, 2004, at Hackensack Hospital in New Jersey, aged 56.
