= Phyllis Huffman =

American casting director

- Born: Phyllis Grennan; June 23, 1944; The Bronx, New York, United States
- Died: March 2, 2006 (aged 61); United States
- Education: Webster University
- Occupation: Casting director
- Years active: 1980–2006
- Spouses: David Huffman (m. 1967; died 1985): Jules Del Vecchio (m. 19??; her death; 2006)
- Children: 2

Phyllis Huffman (June 23, 1944 – March 2, 2006) was an American casting director for film and television. She received numerous award nominations from the Casting Society of America (CSA) throughout her career, winning twice.

== Early life and career ==
She was born as Phyllis Grennan in The Bronx, New York, and graduated from Webster University in St. Louis, Missouri. After a brief stint as a flight attendant for Trans World Airlines, she started working in the casting departments of MGM and Paramount Pictures, becoming a protégé of casting director Marion Dougherty. Huffman moved on to Warner Bros., ultimately becoming the vice president of the studio's television casting department.

Huffman served as casting director for such TV mini-series as V The Final Battle and North and South, earning her first CSA award for the latter. She won her first CSA award in 1989 for casting the pilot episode of the hit sitcom Murphy Brown. She received a second nomination that same year for casting the pilot for China Beach.

In 1996, Huffman shared two Emmy Award nominations for casting the TV movies The Late Shift and The Boys Next Door. She also earned as sixth CSA nomination for the latter.

The majority of Huffman's film casting work were those for which teamed with director Clint Eastwood, casting fourteen of Eastwood's films and serving as casting executive on two others. In addition, she was casting director for three other films in which Eastwood starred but did not direct, bringing their total number of collaborative works to nineteen. Some of the Eastwood-directed films on which Huffman served as casting director include Honkytonk Man, Bird, Unforgiven, Midnight in the Garden of Good and Evil, and Space Cowboys.

Huffman won her second award from the CSA for her casting of Eastwood's Mystic River, and received her final CSA nomination for casting Eastwood's Million Dollar Baby. Her career spanned 24 years, eleven CSA nominations (including two wins), and two Emmy nominations.

The final films she cast were Clint Eastwood's Flags of Our Fathers and Letters from Iwo Jima, opening seven months and nine months, respectively, after her death on March 2, 2006, aged 61.

== Personal life ==
She was married to actor David Huffman until his death in 1985. She is survived by her two sons.
