= Johanna Ray =

American talent agent, casting director

Johanna Ray is an American casting director and film producer, sometimes credited as "Joanna Ray". She has been nominated for five Artios Awards, and won once in 1990. She has worked with Quentin Tarantino, David Lynch, Julia Roberts, and Nicolas Cage, among others.

== Personal life ==
Born as Johanna Bennett, she met the late Aldo Ray in 1959 in the UK, but her father, a general in the British army, initially refused permission for her to travel with Ray to the States. They were married from 1960 to 1967, when the marriage ended in divorce. They had two children, Paul and Eric (an actor best known for Twin Peaks).

== Credits ==
=== Casting director ===
- Hell Night (1981)
- Time Walker (1982)
- Frightmare (1983)
- Metalstorm: The Destruction of Jared-Syn (1983)
- Firestarter (1984)
- Conan the Destroyer (1984)
- Fear City (1984)
- Dreamscape (1984)
- Ghoulies (1985)
- Creature (1985)
- Amazing Stories (1985–1986)
- Blue Velvet (1986)
- Into the Homeland (1987)
- The Cowboy and the Frenchman (1988)
- Satisfaction (1988)
- The Blob (1988)
- Call from Space (1989)
- Beverly Hills, 90210 (1990)
- Wild at Heart (1990)
- Twin Peaks (1990–1991)
- Twin Peaks: Fire Walk with Me (1992)
- Ruby (1992)
- Showgirls (1995)
- Mulholland Drive (2001)
- Inland Empire (2006)
- Twin Peaks: The Return (2017)

=== Producer ===
- Twin Peaks: Fire Walk with Me (1992)
- Gospel According to Harry (1994)
- Dead Connection (1994)
- Twin Peaks: The Return (2017)

== Awards and nominations ==
Artios awards:

- Nominated, 1987, Best Casting Feature for Film, Drama for: Blue Velvet (shared with Pat Golden)
- Nominated, 1988, Best Casting for Feature Film, Drama for: Gaby: A True Story
- Won, 1990, Best Casting for TV, Dramatic Episodic for: Twin Peaks
- Nominated, 1991, Best Casting for TV, Beverly Hills, 90210: Class of Beverly Hills (pilot episode)
- Nominated, 2002, Best Casting for Feature Film, Drama for: Mulholland Drive
