= Francine Maisler =

American casting director

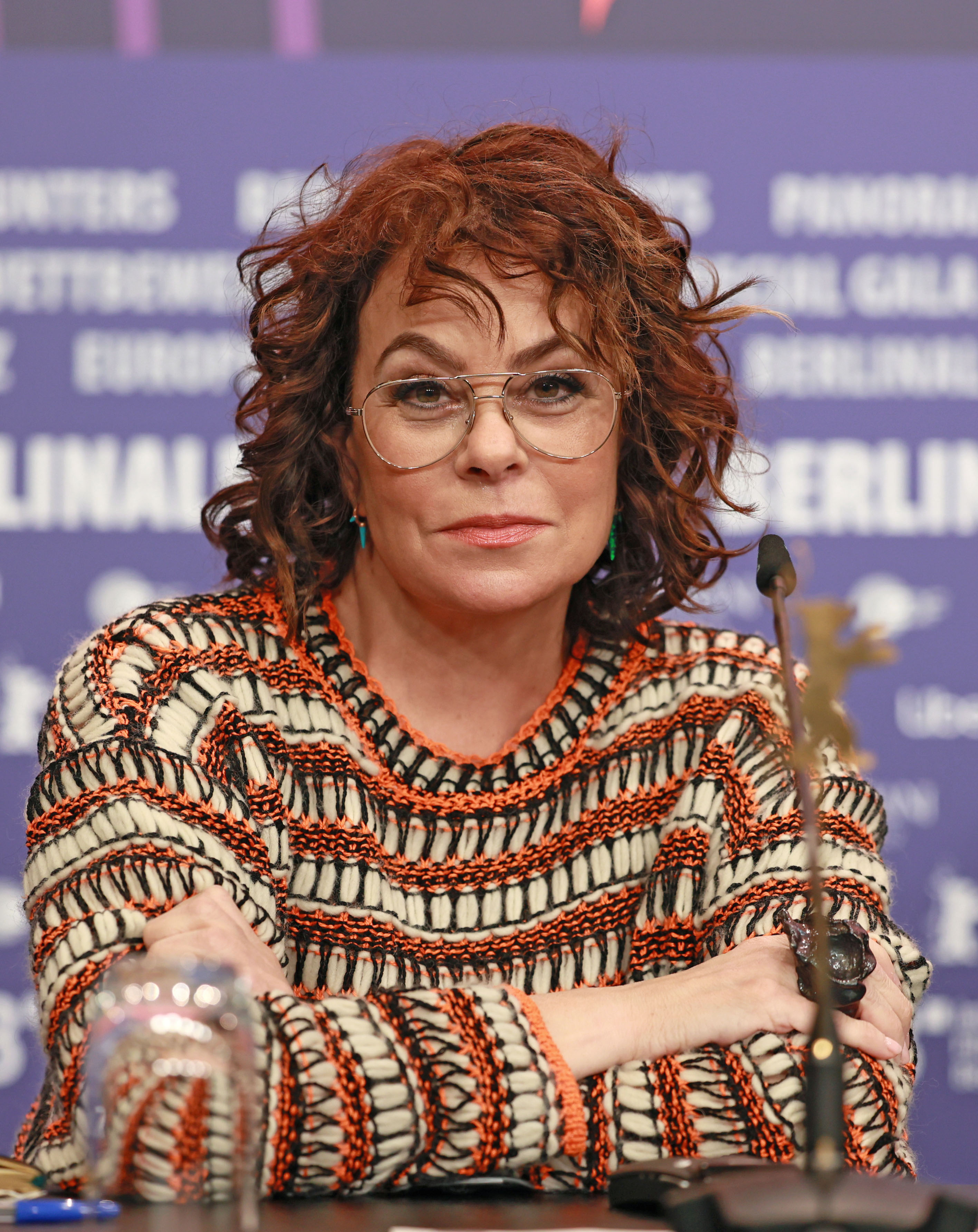
- Maisler in 2023
- Born: United States
- Occupation: Casting director

Francine Maisler is an American casting director. At the 98th Academy Awards, she was nominated for the inaugural Academy Award for Achievement in Casting for the film Sinners.

In addition to her Academy Award nomination, she won two Primetime Emmy Awards and was nominated for five more in the category Outstanding Casting for her work on the television programs Studio 60 on the Sunset Strip, Succession, The Underground Railroad, True Detective, The Studio and DTF St. Louis.

In 2021, The Hollywood Reporter named Maisler as the Casting Director of the Year.

== Selected filmography ==
=== Film ===
Year	Title	Director	Ref(s)
1994	Reality Bites	Ben Stiller	
1995	The Usual Suspects	Bryan Singer	
1995	The Quick and the Dead	Sam Raimi	
1995	Bad Boys	Michael Bay	
1996	The People vs. Larry Flynt	Miloš Forman	
1997	Gattaca	Andrew Niccol	
1997	As Good as It Gets	James L. Brooks	
1998	Out of Sight	Steven Soderbergh	
1998	How Stella Got Her Groove Back	Kevin Rodney Sullivan	
1998	You've Got Mail	Nora Ephron	
1999	Man on the Moon	Miloš Forman	
2000	Duets	Bruce Paltrow	
2001	A Knight's Tale	Brian Helgeland	
2002	Simone	Andrew Niccol	
2002	Spider-Man	Sam Raimi	
2003	Down with Love	Peyton Reed	
2003	21 Grams	Alejandro González Iñárritu	
2004	Collateral	Michael Mann	
2004	Meet the Fockers	Jay Roach	
2005	The New World	Terrence Malick	
2005	Bewitched	Nora Ephron	
2005	Stay	Marc Forster	
2005	Memoirs of a Geisha	Rob Marshall	
2006	Babel	Alejandro González Iñárritu	
2006	Miami Vice	Michael Mann	
2006	Stranger than Fiction	Marc Forster	
2007	Spider-Man 3	Sam Raimi	
2007	Into the Wild	Sean Penn	
2008	Hancock	Peter Berg	
2008	Tropic Thunder	Ben Stiller	
2008	Quantum of Solace	Marc Forster	
2008	Milk	Gus Van Sant	
2009	Julie & Julia	Nora Ephron	
2009	The Soloist	Joe Wright	
2009	Nine	Rob Marshall	
2010	Greenberg	Noah Baumbach	
2010	Eat Pray Love	Ryan Murphy	
2010	How Do You Know	James L. Brooks	
2011	The Green Hornet	Michel Gondry	
2011	Pirates of the Caribbean: On Stranger Tides	Rob Marshall	
2011	Restless	Gus Van Sant	
2011	The Tree of Life	Terrence Malick	
2011	50/50	Jonathan Levine	
2011	Moneyball	Bennett Miller	
2012	Mud	Jeff Nichols	
2012	The Amazing Spider-Man	Marc Webb	
2012	Lawless	John Hillcoat	
2012	Promised Land	Gus Van Sant	
2013	This Is the End	Seth Rogen and Evan Goldberg	
2013	12 Years a Slave	Steve McQueen	
2013	Last Vegas	Jon Turteltaub	
2013	Elysium	Neill Blomkamp	
2013	Captain Phillips	Paul Greengrass	
2014	The Amazing Spider-Man 2	Marc Webb	
2014	Birdman	Alejandro González Iñárritu	
2014	Unbroken	Angelina Jolie	
2014	RoboCop	Jose Padilha	
2014	The Interview	Seth Rogen and Evan Goldberg	
2014	Into the Woods	Rob Marshall	
2014	Ex Machina	Alex Garland	
2015	Fifty Shades of Grey	Sam Taylor-Johnson	
2015	Knight of Cups	Terrence Malick	
2015	Sicario	Denis Villeneuve	
2015	Aloha	Cameron Crowe	
2015	Steve Jobs	Danny Boyle	
2015	Creed	Ryan Coogler	
2015	Black Mass	Scott Cooper	
2015	The Big Short	Adam McKay	
2015	The Revenant	Alejandro González Iñárritu	
2016	Jason Bourne	Paul Greengrass	
2016	Arrival	Denis Villeneuve	
2016	Passengers	Morten Tyldum	
2016	Midnight Special	Jeff Nichols	
2016	Sausage Party	Conrad Vernon and Greg Tiernan	
2016	Neighbors 2: Sorority Rising	Nicholas Stoller	
2016	The 5th Wave	J Blakeson	
2016	Loving	Jeff Nichols	
2016	Nocturnal Animals	Tom Ford	
2016	The Light Between Oceans	Derek Cianfrance	
2017	Baby Driver	Edgar Wright	
2017	The Meyerowitz Stories	Noah Baumbach	
2017	The Killing of a Sacred Deer	Yorgos Lanthimos	
2017	Molly's Game	Aaron Sorkin	
2017	War Machine	David Michôd	
2017	Song to Song	Terrence Malick	
2017	Hostiles	Scott Cooper	
2017	Blade Runner 2049	Denis Villeneuve	
2018	Don't Worry, He Won't Get Far on Foot	Gus Van Sant	
2018	Annihilation	Alex Garland	
2018	First Man	Damien Chazelle	
2018	The Sisters Brothers	Jacques Audiard	
2018	Outlaw King	David Mackenzie	
2018	Beautiful Boy	Felix van Groeningen	
2018	Widows	Steve McQueen	
2018	A Million Little Pieces	Sam Taylor-Johnson	
2018	Vice	Adam McKay	
2019	Long Shot	Jonathan Levine	
2019	Marriage Story	Noah Baumbach	
2019	The King	David Michôd	
2019	Little Women	Greta Gerwig	
2019	Uncut Gems	Josh and Benny Safdie	
2020	The Trial of the Chicago 7	Aaron Sorkin	
2020	An American Pickle	Brandon Trost	
2020	Greyhound	Aaron Schneider	
2020	News of the World	Paul Greengrass	
2021	Dune	Denis Villeneuve	
2021	Don't Look Up	Adam McKay	
2021	The Unforgivable	Nora Fingscheidt	
2021	Being the Ricardos	Aaron Sorkin	
2022	Bones and All	Luca Guadagnino	
2022	Babylon	Damien Chazelle	
2022	She Said	Maria Schrader	
2023	Are You There God? It's Me, Margaret.	Kelly Fremon Craig	
2023	The Bikeriders	Jeff Nichols	
2023	Foe	Garth Davis	
2024	Dune: Part Two	Denis Villeneuve	
2024	Civil War	Alex Garland	
2024	Challengers	Luca Guadagnino	
2024	Joker: Folie à Deux	Todd Phillips	
2024	Rebel Ridge	Jeremy Saulnier	
2024	Mufasa: The Lion King	Barry Jenkins	
2025	Sinners	Ryan Coogler	
2025	A Big Bold Beautiful Journey	Kogonada	
2025	Springsteen: Deliver Me from Nowhere	Scott Cooper	
2025	The Lost Bus	Paul Greengrass	
2025	The Running Man	Edgar Wright	
2025	Ella McCay	James L. Brooks	
2026	Primetime	Lance Oppenheim	
2026	Digger	Alejandro González Iñárritu	
2026	The Social Reckoning	Aaron Sorkin	
2026	Klara and the Sun	Taika Waititi	
2026	Dune: Part Three †	Denis Villeneuve	
2027	Narnia: The Magician's Nephew †	Greta Gerwig	
2027	Snoop †	Craig Brewer	
TBA	Cry to Heaven †	Tom Ford	
TBA	Heat 2 †	Michael Mann	

=== Television ===
Year	Title	Network	Ref(s)
2006-2007	Studio 60 on the Sunset Strip	NBC	
2012-2013	The Newsroom	HBO	
2021	The Underground Railroad	Amazon Prime Video	
2022-2023	Winning Time: The Rise of the Lakers Dynasty	HBO	
2025	The Studio	Apple TV	
2026	DTF St. Louis	HBO	

== Awards and nominations ==
=== Academy Awards ===
Year	Title	Category	Result
2025	Sinners	Best Casting	Nominated

=== British Academy Film Awards ===
Year	Title	Category	Result
2019	Marriage Story	Best Casting	Nominated
2021	Dune	Best Casting	Nominated
2025	Sinners	Best Casting	Nominated

=== Primetime Emmy Awards ===
Year	Title	Category	Result
2007	Studio 60 on the Sunset Strip	Outstanding Casting for a Drama Series	Nominated
2021	The Underground Railroad	Outstanding Casting for a Limited or Anthology Series or Movie	Nominated
2024	True Detective: Night Country	Outstanding Casting for a Limited or Anthology Series or Movie	Nominated
2025	The Studio	Outstanding Casting for a Comedy Series	Won
2026	DTF St. Louis	Outstanding Casting for a Limited or Anthology Series or Movie	Nominated
