= Cindy Tolan =

Casting director

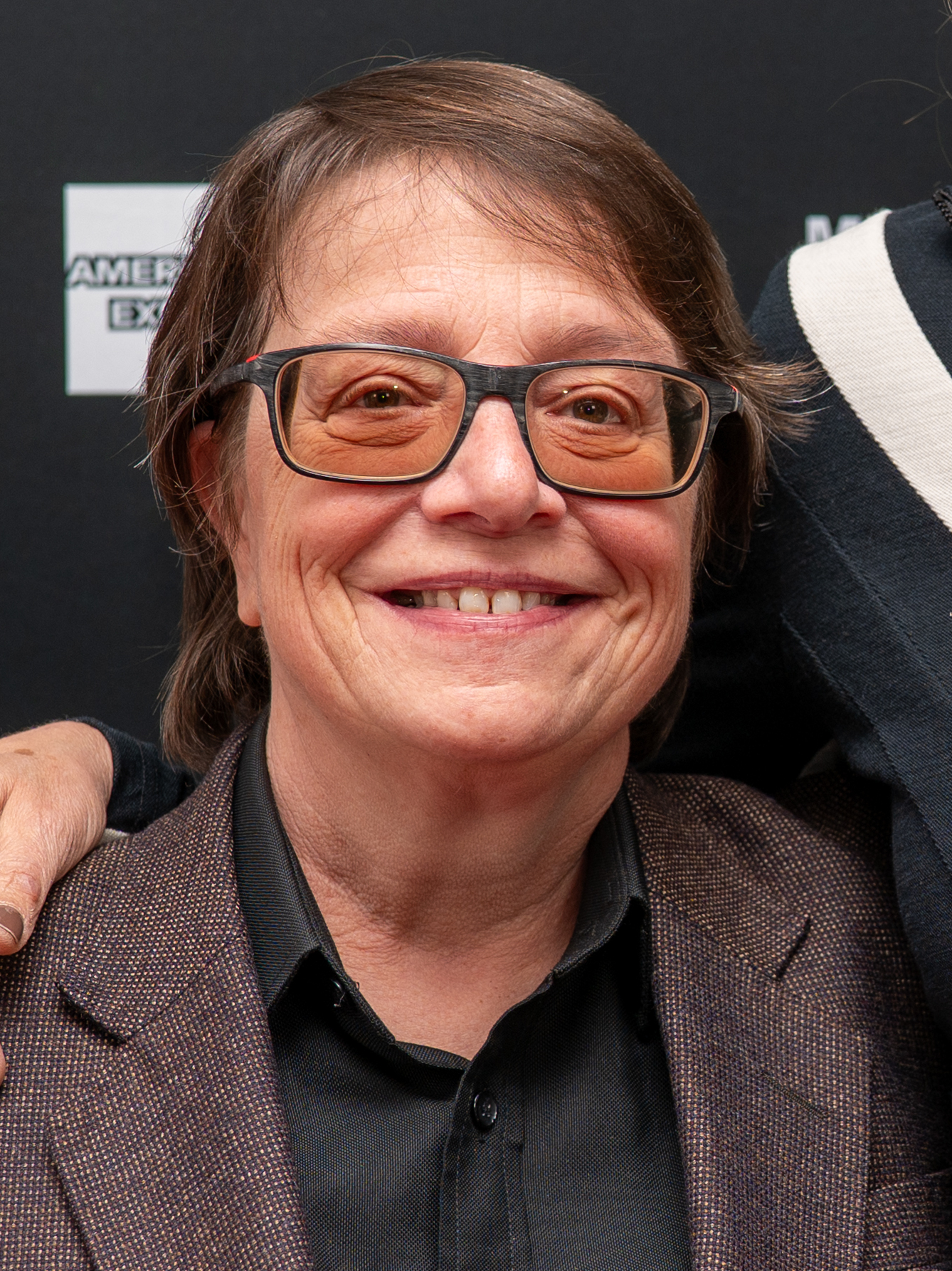
- Tolan at the 2025 Montclair Film Festival
- Occupation: Casting director
- Known for: Casting the 2021 film of West Side Story
- Awards: BAFTA for Casting Direction; Emmy: Outstanding Casting For A Comedy Series; Black Reel Awards: Best Cast (ensemble)

Cindy Tolan is an American casting director and producer. Her career began in theatre, before she transitioned to television and film. She was awarded a BAFTA for her work as casting director of West Side Story in 2021. For the film she auditioned 30,000 people in order to create an authentic cast with performers of Latin descent. She is credited with the discovery of Rachel Zegler and for encouraging Ariana DeBose to audition for the production.

In 2019 she was nominated for two Black Reel Awards for different films, competing with herself in the Best Ensemble category for If Beale Street Could Talk and Sorry to Bother You. In 2018 she awarded an Emmy for her work on The Marvelous Mrs Maisel - Tolan was part of a team who cast the first season, but subsequently was the sole casting director for seasons two and three. She is a member of the Casting Society of America.

== Awards and nominations ==
- Emmy: Outstanding Casting for a Limited or Anthology Series or Movie - 2025 - The Penguin (nominated)
- Artios Award: Big Budget Drama - 2023 - The Fabelmans (nominated)
- BAFTA Award for Best Casting - 2021 - West Side Story (winner)
- Emmy: Outstanding Casting for a Comedy Series - 2020 - The Marvelous Mrs Maisel (nominated)
- Emmy: Outstanding Casting for a Comedy Series - 2019 - The Marvelous Mrs Maisel (nominated)
- Emmy: Outstanding Casting for a Comedy Series - 2018 - The Marvelous Mrs Maisel (winner)
- Emmy: Outstanding Casting for a Comedy Series - 2016 - Unbreakable Kimmy Schmidt (nominated)
- Black Reel Awards: Best Cast (ensemble) - 2016 - Straight Outta Compton (winner)
- Artios Award: Best Feature Film Casting - 2007 - The Namesake (nominated))

== Selected filmography ==
- The Fabelmans (2022)
- West Side Story (2021)
- If Beale Street Could Talk (2018)
- Wildling (2017)
- Straight Outta Compton (2015)
- Maggie's Plan (2015)
- This Is Where I Leave You (2014)
- A Winter's Tale (2014)
- Mississippi Grind (2014)
- The Place Beyond The Pines (2013)
- The Reluctant Fundamentalist (2013)
- The Namesake (2006)
