= April Webster =

American casting director

April Webster is an American casting director, based in Los Angeles, California, known for her work in film and television. Webster has worked with some of the most successful directors, including several projects with J. J. Abrams.

She has been nominated for thirteen Artios Awards, and has won three in addition to her four Emmy nominations. Her casting credits have included Star Wars: The Force Awakens, Star Trek, Mission: Impossible III, Tomorrowland, and Lost.

== Casting director credits ==
=== Film ===
- Star Wars: The Force Awakens (2015)
- Tomorrowland (2015)
- 2012 (2009)
- Star Trek (2009)
- Mission: Impossible III (2006)
- The Day After Tomorrow (2004)
- Eight Legged Freaks (2002)
- All the Queen's Men (2001)
- The Patriot (2000)
- The Thirteenth Floor (1999)
- Godzilla (1998)
- Stargate(1994)
- Martians Go Home(1989)
- Death Before Dishonor (1987)

=== Television ===
- Jack Ryan (2018–2023)
- Altered Carbon (2018–2020)
- Criminal Minds: Suspect Behavior (2011)
- Fringe (2008–2013)
- Lost (2004–2010)
- Alias (2002–2006)
- Nurses (1992–1994)
- Paper Dolls (1984)
- Knight Rider (1982–1984)
- Leverage (2008-2012)

== Awards and nominations ==
Artios awards:

- Won, 2009, Outstanding Achievement in Casting – Big Budget Feature - Drama for: Star Trek (shared with Alyssa Weisberg)
- Nominated, 2009, Outstanding Achievement in Casting – Television Pilot - Drama for: Fringe (shared with Lonnie Hamerman)
- Nominated, 2008, Outstanding Achievement in Casting - Television Series – Drama for: Lost (shared with Veronica Collins)
- Nominated, 2006, Best Dramatic Episodic Casting for: Lost (shared with Mandy Sherman and Veronica Collins)
- Nominated, 2005, Best Dramatic Episodic Casting for: Lost (shared with Mandy Sherman)
- Nominated, 2004, Best Casting for TV, Dramatic Episodic for: Alias (shared with Mandy Sherman)
- Nominated, 2003, Best Casting for TV, Dramatic Episodic for: Alias (shared with Mandy Sherman)
- Nominated, 2002, Best Casting for TV, Dramatic Episodic for: Alias
- Won, 2001, Best Casting for TV, Dramatic Pilot for: “CSI: Crime Scene Investigation”
- Nominated, 2001, Best Casting for Feature Film, Drama for The Patriot (Shared with David Bloch)
- Nominated, 1999, Best Casting for TV, Dramatic Pilot for Providence (Shared with David Bloch)
- Nominated, 1997, Best Casting for TV Movie of the Week for: Grand Avenue

Emmy Awards:

- Nominated, 2006, Outstanding Casting for a Drama Series for: Lost (shared with Veronica Collins and Mandy Sherman)
- Won, 2005, Outstanding Casting for a Drama Series for: Lost (shared with Veronica Collins, Alyssa Weisberg, and Mandy Sherman)
- Nominated, 2002, Outstanding Casting for a Drama Series for: Alias (shared with Megan McConnell and Janet Gilmore)
- Nominated, 1997, Outstanding Casting for a Miniseries or a Special for Grand Avenue
