= Mary Jo Slater =

American film producer

- Born: Mary Jo Lawton; April 19, 1946 (age 80); Trenton, New Jersey, U.S.
- Spouses: Michael Hawkins (m. 1966; div. 1976) Jeffrey Wilson (m. 1982, divorced) William Henry Taron (m. 1990)
- Children: 2, including Christian Slater

Mary Jo Slater (née Lawton; born April 19, 1946) is an American casting director and producer for film, television and theatre. She has over 100 movie credits to her name.

== Early life and career ==
Slater was born in Trenton, New Jersey, the daughter of Anna Mae (née Sweeny; 1913–1988) and Leonard Joseph Lawton (1914–1995). She was a production assistant for Mark Twain Tonight! and had her first casting role for the 1977 Broadway revival of Hair. She went on to cast five more theatre productions before moving into film and television. As a casting director, Slater has been nominated six times for the Primetime Emmy Award for Outstanding Casting for a Drama Series, including three nominations for The Tudors.

== Personal life ==
She was married to actor Michael Hawkins (Note: He was born Thomas Knight Slater.) and with him had one son, actor Christian Slater. She is also the mother of actor Ryan Slater by her second husband, builder Jeffrey Wilson.
