= Nina Gold =

Casting director

- Born: Nina Gold
- Education: Christ's College, Cambridge
- Occupation: Casting director

Nina Gold is a British casting director known for her work on the HBO series Rome, Game of Thrones, and Chernobyl, the Netflix series The Crown, and the Sky Studios series The Day of the Jackal (2024). She has also worked as casting director in films such as Les Misérables, The Martian, The Two Popes, Conclave, and five films in the Star Wars franchise. At the 98th Academy Awards, Gold received a nomination for the inaugural Academy Award for Achievement in Casting for the 2025 film Hamnet.

== Career ==
Gold began casting while at university, studying at Christ's College, University of Cambridge. Her first casting job was to recruit extras for an AC/DC music video. After spending several years casting for music videos and commercials, Gold cast a McDonald's commercial directed by Mike Leigh in 1992. Seven years later, Leigh hired Gold to cast Topsy-Turvy, her first major film. Gold has been responsible for the casting of roles in seven of Mike Leigh's films since 1999.

After casting the HBO series Rome, Gold was hired in 2009 by David Benioff and D. B. Weiss to cast a new HBO series, Game of Thrones, alongside Robert Sterne. Gold worked on casting the Sky–HBO miniseries Chernobyl (2019).. She cast the Amy Winehouse biopic, Back to Black, released in 2024.

In 2026, Gold was nominated for the inaugural Academy Award for Achievement in Casting for the 2025 film Hamnet. That same year, it was announced by Amazon MGM Studios that she had been hired as casting director for the untitled 26th James Bond film and would lead the search for the next actor to portray the eponymous character following Daniel Craig.

== Personal life ==
Gold's partner is Frank Hewetson, a logistics coordinator for Greenpeace. They have two children together.

== Filmography ==
=== Selected television credits ===
Year	Television show	Notes
2005–2007	Rome	22 episodes
2008	John Adams	Miniseries
2011–2019	Game of Thrones	73 episodes
2015	Wolf Hall	Miniseries
2016–2019	The Crown	30 episodes
2017	Taboo	8 episodes
2017	Top of the Lake	6 episodes
2018	Patrick Melrose	5 episodes
2019	Chernobyl	Miniseries
2021	The Nevers	7 episodes
2021	Landscapers	4 episodes
2021	This Is Going to Hurt	7 episodes
2022–2024	Bad Sisters	18 episodes
2022	Andor	24 episodes
2022–2024	Slow Horses	24 episodes
2024	Baby Reindeer	Miniseries
2024–present	3 Body Problem	8 episodes
2024	Say Nothing	Miniseries
2024–present	The Day of the Jackal	10 episodes
2024	The Franchise	8 episodes
2026	Lord of the Flies	Miniseries
TBA	Berlin Noir †	

=== Selected film credits ===
Year	Film
1997	The Borrowers
1999	Topsy-Turvy
2000	Love's Labour's Lost
2000	Beautiful Creatures
2000	Rat
2001	Triumph of Love
2001	The Island of the Mapmaker's Wife
2001	The 51st State
2002	All or Nothing
2002	Max
2002	The Final Curtain
2004	The Life and Death of Peter Sellers
2004	De-Lovely
2004	Vera Drake
2005	Sahara
2006	The Illusionist
2006	Amazing Grace
2007	The Good Night
2007	Hot Fuzz
2007	Mr. Bean's Holiday
2007	Eastern Promises
2008	The Other Man
2008	Happy-Go-Lucky
2009	Bright Star
2009	Perrier's Bounty
2009	Nowhere Boy
2009	A Christmas Carol
2010	Leap Year
2010	Barney's Version
2010	Another Year
2010	The Chronicles of Narnia: The Voyage of the Dawn Treader
2010	The King's Speech
2011	Jane Eyre
2011	Attack the Block
2011	My Week with Marilyn
2011	The Iron Lady
2012	Prometheus
2012	Sightseers
2012	Les Misérables
2013	The World's End
2013	Rush
2013	The Counselor
2014	Mr. Turner
2014	The Imitation Game
2014	The Theory of Everything
2014	A Little Chaos
2014	Paddington
2014	Exodus: Gods and Kings
2015	The Danish Girl
2015	The Martian
2015	Burnt
2015	In the Heart of the Sea
2015	Star Wars: The Force Awakens
2016	The BFG
2016	Bridget Jones's Baby
2016	Inferno
2016	Allied
2017	On Chesil Beach
2017	Disobedience
2017	Paddington 2
2017	Star Wars: The Last Jedi
2017	The Children Act
2018	Annihilation
2018	Solo: A Star Wars Story
2018	Jurassic World: Fallen Kingdom
2018	Mamma Mia! Here We Go Again
2019	The Kid Who Would Be King
2019	The Two Popes
2019	Star Wars: The Rise of Skywalker
2019	1917
2020	The Courier
2020	Misbehaviour
2020	Eurovision Song Contest: The Story of Fire Saga
2020	Rebecca
2021	The Mauritanian
2021	The Power of the Dog
2021	Last Night in Soho
2022	Morbius
2022	Jurassic World: Dominion
2022	The Wonder
2022	Empire of Light
2022	Catherine Called Birdy
2023	Indiana Jones and the Dial of Destiny
2023	One Life
2023	Wonka
2024	Spaceman
2024	Scoop
2024	Back to Black
2024	Blitz
2024	Conclave
2024	Eden
2025	The Roses
2025	Ballad of a Small Player
2025	Jay Kelly
2025	Hamnet
2026	The Death of Robin Hood
2026	Tender Loving Care
2026	A Talent for Murder
2027	Narnia: The Magician's Nephew †
2027	The Great Beyond †
2028	The Beatles - A Four-Film Cinematic Event † (Note: Including Untitled Paul McCartney film, Untitled John Lennon film, Untitled George Harrison film and Untitled Ringo Starr film)
TBA	Hillside Drive †

== Awards and nominations ==
Year	Award	Category	Work	Result	Ref.
2005	Creative Arts Emmy Awards	Outstanding Casting for a Miniseries, Movie or a Special	The Life and Death of Peter Sellers	Nominated	
2008	Creative Arts Emmy Awards	Outstanding Casting for a Miniseries, Movie or a Special	John Adams	Won	
2011	Artios Awards	Outstanding Achievement in Casting – Television Pilot Drama	Game of Thrones	Nominated	
2011	Artios Awards	Outstanding Achievement in Casting – Television Series Drama	Game of Thrones	Nominated	
2011	Creative Arts Emmy Awards	Outstanding Casting for a Drama Series	Game of Thrones	Nominated	
2012	Artios Awards	Outstanding Achievement in Casting – Television Series Drama	Game of Thrones	Nominated	
2012	Creative Arts Emmy Awards	Outstanding Casting for a Drama Series	Game of Thrones	Nominated	
2013	Artios Awards	Outstanding Achievement in Casting – Television Series Drama	Game of Thrones	Nominated	
2013	Artios Awards	Outstanding Achievement in Casting – Big Budget Feature (Drama)	Les Misérables	Nominated	
2013	Creative Arts Emmy Awards	Outstanding Casting for a Drama Series	Game of Thrones	Nominated	
2014	Artios Awards	Outstanding Achievement in Casting – Television Series Drama	Game of Thrones	Nominated	
2014	Creative Arts Emmy Awards	Outstanding Casting for a Drama Series	Game of Thrones	Nominated	
2015	Artios Awards	Outstanding Achievement in Casting – Television Series Drama	Game of Thrones	Won	
2015	Artios Awards	Outstanding Achievement in Casting – Studio or Independent Drama	The Theory of Everything	Nominated	
2015	Creative Arts Emmy Awards	Outstanding Casting for a Limited Series, Movie, or Special	Wolf Hall	Nominated	
2015	Creative Arts Emmy Awards	Outstanding Casting for a Drama Series	Game of Thrones	Won	
2016	Artios Awards	Outstanding Achievement in Casting – Television Series Drama	Game of Thrones	Nominated	
2016	Artios Awards	Outstanding Achievement in Casting – Big Budget Feature (Drama)	Star Wars: The Force Awakens	Nominated	
2016	British Academy of Film and Television Arts	Special Award	—N/a	Won	
2016	Creative Arts Emmy Awards	Outstanding Casting for a Drama Series	Game of Thrones	Won	
2017	Artios Awards	Outstanding Achievement in Casting – Television Pilot and First Season Drama	The Crown	Nominated	
2017	Creative Arts Emmy Awards	Outstanding Casting for a Drama Series	The Crown	Nominated	
2018	Artios Awards	Outstanding Achievement in Casting – Television Drama Series	The Crown	Won	
2018	Creative Arts Emmy Awards	Outstanding Casting for a Drama Series	The Crown	Won	
2018	Creative Arts Emmy Awards	Outstanding Casting for a Drama Series	Game of Thrones	Nominated	
2018	Creative Arts Emmy Awards	Outstanding Casting for a Limited Series, Movie, or Special	Patrick Melrose	Nominated	
2019	Creative Arts Emmy Awards	Outstanding Casting for a Drama Series	Game of Thrones	Won	
2019	Creative Arts Emmy Awards	Outstanding Casting for a Limited Series, Movie, or Special	Chernobyl	Nominated	
2020	British Academy of Film and Television Arts	Best Casting	The Two Popes	Nominated	
2020	Creative Arts Emmy Awards	Outstanding Casting for a Drama Series	The Crown	Nominated	
2023	Creative Arts Emmy Awards	Outstanding Casting for a Drama Series	Bad Sisters	Nominated	
2024	The Casting Director Guild Awards	Best Child Casting (All Media)	Blitz	Nominated	
2024	The Casting Director Guild Awards	Best Casting of a TV Drama Series	The Day of the Jackal	Nominated	
2024	The Casting Director Guild Awards	Best Casting of a TV Drama Series	Say Nothing	Nominated	
2024	The Casting Director Guild Awards	Best Casting of a TV Drama Series	Slow Horses	Nominated	
2024	The Casting Director Guild Awards	Best Casting of a Limited or Single Series	Baby Reindeer	Nominated	
2024	The Casting Director Guild Awards	Best Casting of a Film	Conclave	Nominated	
2024	Creative Arts Emmy Awards	Outstanding Casting for a Drama Series	Slow Horses	Nominated	
2024	Creative Arts Emmy Awards	Outstanding Casting for a Limited or Anthology Series or Movie	Baby Reindeer	Won	
2025	British Academy of Film and Television Arts	Best Casting	Conclave	Nominated	
2025	Creative Arts Emmy Awards	Outstanding Casting for a Drama Series	Slow Horses	Nominated	
2026	Academy Awards	Best Casting	Hamnet	Nominated	
