= John Papsidera =

American casting director

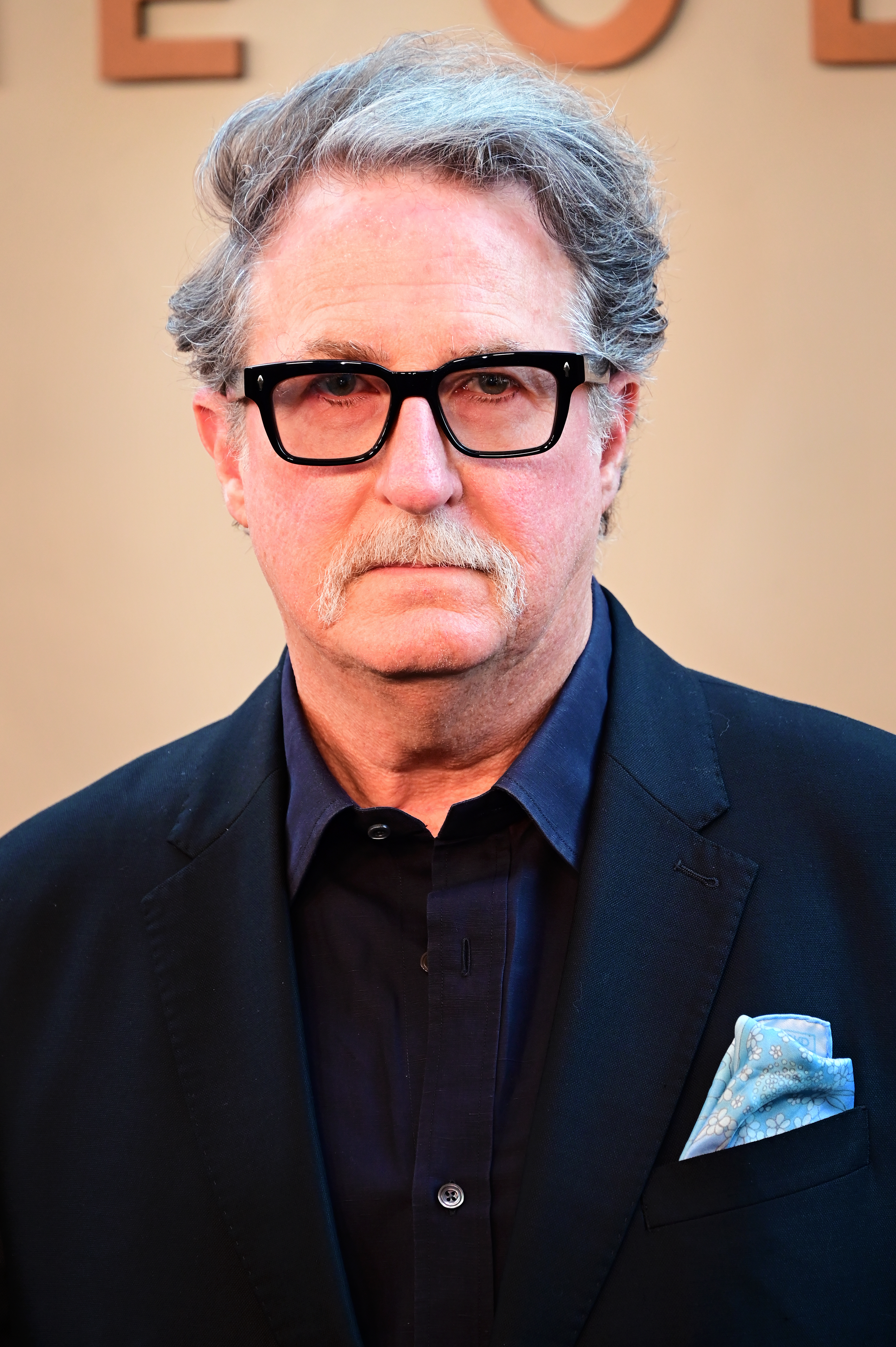
- Papsidera in 2026
- Occupation: Casting Director
- Years active: 1997–present

John Papsidera is a casting director based in Los Angeles, California, known for his work across film and television, especially his work with some of the industry’s most successful directors, including Christopher Nolan, Ruben Fleischer, Jason Reitman, Roland Emmerich, and James Gunn. Backstage described him as Nolan's "go-to casting director".

He has received sixteen Artios Awards nominations and has won four times. He has also been nominated for seven Primetime Emmy awards and has won twice. Before becoming a casting director, he was an actor.

His casting credits in film include The Dark Knight, Inception, Interstellar, Memento, Enchanted, Final Destination, Zombieland, Venom, Jurassic World, The Suicide Squad, and the DC Studios film Superman (2025). On television, his credits include shows such as Westworld, The Expanse (seasons 1 and 2), Peacemaker, Wednesday, Yellowstone and It's Always Sunny in Philadelphia (season 1).

== Credits ==
=== Film ===
- The Odyssey (2026)
- Nuremberg (2025)
- Happy Gilmore 2 (2025)
- Superman (2025)
- Saturday Night (2024)
- Twisters (2024)
- Ghostbusters: Frozen Empire (2024)
- Oppenheimer (2023)
- Uncharted (2022)
- Ghostbusters: Afterlife (2021)
- The Suicide Squad (2021)
- Army of the Dead (2021)
- Tenet (2020)
- Project Power (2020)
- Bloodshot (2020)
- Zombieland: Double Tap (2019)
- Venom (2018)
- Dunkirk (2017)
- The Fate of the Furious (2017)
- Jurassic World (2015)
- Interstellar (2014)
- White House Down (2013)
- The Dark Knight Rises (2012)
- The Grey (2012)
- The Details (2011)
- Inception (2010)
- Burlesque (2010)
- The Crazies (2010)
- Unthinkable (2010)
- Zombieland (2009)
- Drag Me to Hell (2009)
- Dragonball Evolution (2009)
- The Informers (2009)
- The Dark Knight (2008)
- Enchanted (2007)
- Black Christmas (2006)
- Final Destination 3 (2006)
- The Prestige (2006)
- Batman Begins (2005)
- The Longest Yard (2005)
- Catwoman (2004)
- Club Dread (2004)
- Secret Window (2004)
- Agent Cody Banks 2: Destination London (2004)
- My Boss's Daughter (2003)
- Octane (2003)
- Dickie Roberts: Former Child Star (2003)
- Willard (2003)
- Final Destination 2 (2003)
- Memento (2000)
- Final Destination (2000)
- Another Day in Paradise (1998)
- Austin Powers: International Man of Mystery (1997)

=== Television ===
- Landman (2024-present)
- Wednesday (2022-present)
- Peacemaker (2022-present)
- Yellowstone (2018-2024)
- The Madison] (2026-present)
- Marshals] (2026-present)
- Dutton Ranch] (2026-present)

== Awards and nominations ==
=== Artios Awards ===
- Nominated, 2009, Outstanding Achievement in Casting - Big Budget Feature - Drama for: The Dark Knight
- Nominated, 2008, Outstanding Achievement in Casting – Studio Feature - Comedy for: Enchanted (shared with Marcia Ross and Susan Shopmaker)
- Won, 2006, Best Dramatic Pilot Casting for: Prison Break (Wendy O’Brien and Claire Simon)
- Won, 2005, Best Movie of the Week for: Lackawanna Blues (shared with Wendy O’Brien)
- Nominated, 2005, Best Mini Series Casting for: Revelations (shared with Wendy O’Brien and John Buchan)
- Won, 2004, Best Casting for TV, Dramatic Pilot for: Carnivàle (shared with Wendy O’Brien)
- Nominated, 2004, Best Casting for television film of the Week for: And Starring Pancho Villa as Himself
- Nominated, 2003, Best Casting for television film of the Week for: Live with Baghdad
- Won, 2001, Best Casting for Feature Film, Independent for: Memento
- Nominated, 2000, Best Casting for television film of the Week for: If These Walls Could Talk 2
- Nominated, 1999, Best Casting for Feature Film, Independent for Another Day in Paradise
- Nominated, 1995, Best Casting for television film of the Week for Kingfish: A Story of Huey P. Long (shared with Mindy Marin)

=== Primetime Emmy Awards ===
- Nominated, 2021, Outstanding Casting for a Comedy Series for: The Flight Attendant
- Nominated, 2018, Outstanding Casting for a Drama Series for: Westworld
- Nominated, 2017, Outstanding Casting for a Drama Series for: Westworld
- Won, 2005, Outstanding Casting for a Miniseries, Movie or a Special for Lackawanna Blues
- Nominated, 2004, Outstanding Casting for a Drama Series for: Carnivàle (Shared with Wendy O’Brien)
- Won, 2003, Outstanding Casting for a Miniseries, Movie or a Special for: Live with Baghdad
- Nominated, 2000, Outstanding Casting for a Miniseries, Movie or a Special for: If These Walls Could Talk 2
