= List of accolades received by A Star Is Born (2018 film) =

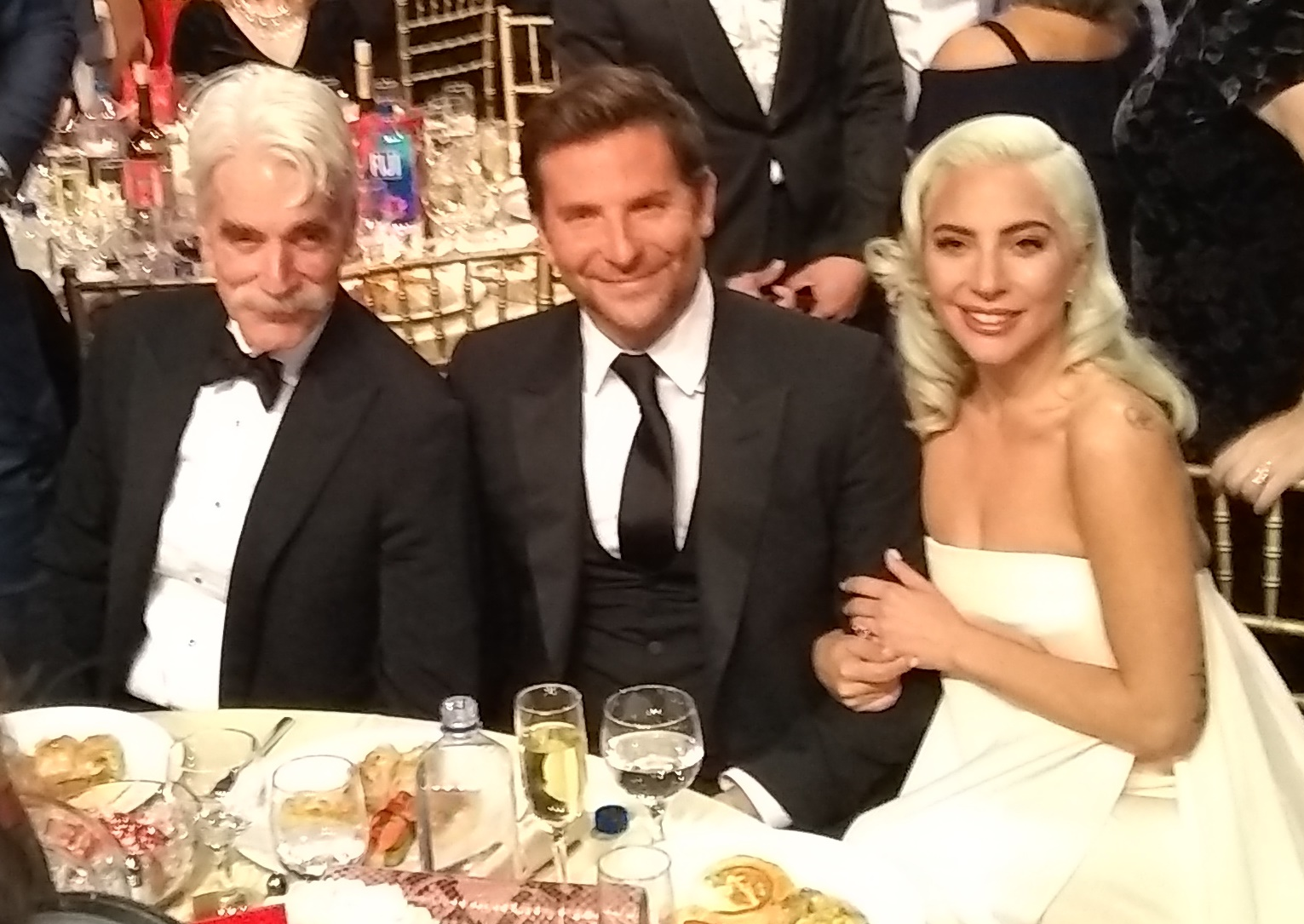
- From left: Sam Elliott, Bradley Cooper and Lady Gaga at the A Star Is Born table at the 24th Critics' Choice Awards on January 13, 2019.
Awards and nominations
Award	Wins	Nominations
AACTA Awards	0	5
AARP's Movies for Grownups Awards	1	3
Academy Awards	1	8
Academy of Country Music	1	1
African-American Film Critics Association	1	1
Alliance of Women Film Journalists	0	1
American Cinema Editors	0	1
American Cinematheque Award	1	1
American Film Institute Awards	1	1
American Music Awards	0	2
American Society of Cinematographers	0	1
APRA Music Awards	1	1
Art Directors Guild Awards	0	1
ASCAP Pop Music Awards	1	1
Austin Film Critics Association	0	2
Australian Film Critics Association	0	1
Billboard Music Awards	0	3
BMI Film, TV & Visual Media Awards	1	1
BMI Pop Awards	1	1
Bodil Awards	0	1
British Academy Film Awards	1	7
BuzzAngle Music Awards	1	1
Capri Hollywood International Film Festival	3	3
Casting Society of America	0	1
Chicago Film Critics Association	0	7
Cinema Audio Society Awards	0	1
Clio Awards	6	6
Costume Designers Guild Awards	0	1
Critics' Choice Movie Awards	2	9
Dallas–Fort Worth Film Critics Association	5	5
Danish Music Awards	1	1
Detroit Film Critics Society	1	6
Digital Spy Reader Awards	2	2
Directors Guild of America Awards	0	2
Dorian Awards	1	7
Dublin Film Critics' Circle	4	4
Florida Film Critics Circle	0	1
Fryderyk	0	1
GAFFA Awards (Denmark)	0	1
GAFFA Awards (Norway)	0	1
GAFFA Awards (Sweden)	1	1
Gaygalan Awards	1	1
Georgia Film Critics Association	3	9
Global Awards	0	1
Golden Eagle Awards	0	1
Golden Globe Awards	1	5
Golden Schmoes Awards	3	7
Golden Tomato Awards	4	4
Golden Trailer Awards	5	12
Grammy Awards	4	7
Grande Prêmio do Cinema Brasileiro	1	1
Grands Prix Sacem	1	1
Guild of Music Supervisors Awards	2	2
Hito Music Awards	1	1
Hollywood Critics Association	1	9
Hollywood Film Awards	1	1
Hollywood Music in Media Awards	2	3
Hollywood Professional Association	0	1
Houston Film Critics Society	1	5
Hungarian Music Awards	1	1
IGN Awards	2	6
iHeartRadio Music Awards	1	1
IndieWire Critics Poll	2	2
International Film Festival of the Art of Cinematography Camerimage	0	1
Jupiter Awards	0	2
Las Vegas Film Critics Society	6	6
Los Angeles Italia Film Festival	1	1
Make-Up Artists and Hair Stylists Guild Awards	1	2
MPSE Golden Reel Awards	0	2
MTV Millennial Awards	0	1
MTV Millennial Awards Brazil	1	2
MTV Movie & TV Awards	2	2
MTV Video Music Awards	0	2
MTV Video Play Awards	1	1
National Board of Review Awards	4	4
National Film Awards UK	0	1
New Music Awards	2	2
New York Film Critics Online Awards	1	1
NRJ Music Awards	1	1
OGAE Song Contest	1	1
Online Film Critics Society	2	5
Palm Springs International Film Festival	1	1
Phoenix Film Critics Society	3	3
Producers Guild of America Awards	0	1
Promax Awards	1	1
Queerties Awards	0	1
Robert Awards	0	1
Rockbjörnen	1	1
Rockol Awards	2	2
RTHK International Pop Poll Awards	3	3
San Diego Film Critics Society	0	3
San Francisco Bay Area Film Critics Circle	0	1
Santa Barbara International Film Festival	1	1
Satellite Awards	3	11
Screen Actors Guild Awards	0	4
Seattle Film Critics Society	0	4
Society of Camera Operators	1	1
Southeastern Film Critics Association	3	3
St. Louis Film Critics Association	2	8
Swiss Music Awards	1	1
TEC Awards	1	3
Teen Choice Awards	0	5
Venice Film Festival	1	1
Washington D.C. Area Film Critics Association	2	8
Webby Awards	1	2
Women Film Critics Circle	0	1
World Soundtrack Awards	1	1
WOWIE Awards	1	3
Writers Guild of America Awards	0	1

Totals (Note: Certain award groups do not simply award one winner. They acknowledge several different recipients, have runners-up, and have third place. Since this is a specific recognition and is different from losing an award, runner-up mentions are considered wins in this award tally. For simplification and to avoid errors, each award in this list has been presumed to have had a prior nomination.)
- Wins: 127
- Nominations: 299

A Star Is Born is a 2018 American musical romantic drama film produced and directed by Bradley Cooper (in his directorial debut) and written by Eric Roth, Cooper and Will Fetters. A remake of the 1937 film of the same name, it stars Cooper, Lady Gaga, Andrew Dice Clay, Dave Chappelle, and Sam Elliott, and follows a hard-drinking musician (Cooper) who discovers and falls in love with a young singer (Gaga). It marks the fourth remake of the original 1937 film, after the 1954 musical, the 1976 musical and the 2013 Bollywood romance film.

A Star Is Born grossed a worldwide total of over $436 million on a production budget of $36 million. On review aggregator Rotten Tomatoes, the film holds an approval rating of 90% based on 536 reviews, with an average rating of 8.1/10. The website's critical consensus reads, "With appealing leads, deft direction, and an affecting love story, A Star Is Born is a remake done right—and a reminder that some stories can be just as effective in the retelling." On Metacritic, the film has a weighted average score of 88 out of 100, based on 60 critics, indicating "universal acclaim". Audiences polled by CinemaScore gave the film an average grade of "A" on an A+ to F scale, while PostTrak reported film-goers gave it a 90% positive score.

The film has received numerous awards and nominations, recognizing Cooper's, Gaga's and Elliott's performances and Cooper's direction, as well as the screenplay, cinematography and its soundtrack. Both the American Film Institute and National Board of Review chose it as one of their top ten best films of 2018. The film also won three more accolades from the National Board of Review, including Best Director (Cooper), Best Actress (Gaga) and Best Supporting Actor (Elliott). At the 91st Academy Awards, A Star is Born received eight nominations, including Best Picture, winning Best Original Song for "Shallow", as well as five nominations at the 76th Golden Globe Awards, including Best Motion Picture – Drama, also winning Best Original Song for "Shallow". At the 24th Critics' Choice Movie Awards, Gaga won the categories of Best Actress and Best Song for "Shallow". A Star Is Born also received seven nominations at the 72nd British Academy Film Awards, five of them in different categories for Cooper, which made him the second most nominated person in a single edition in the awards' history. For her contribution on the soundtrack for A Star Is Born, including "Shallow", Gaga became the first woman in history to win an Academy Award, BAFTA Award, Golden Globe Award and Grammy Award in one single year.

== Accolades ==
Accolades received by A Star Is Born
Award	Date of ceremony	Category	Recipient(s)	Result	Ref(s)
AACTA International Awards	January 4, 2019	Best Film	A Star Is Born	Nominated	
AACTA International Awards	January 4, 2019	Best Direction	Bradley Cooper	Nominated	
AACTA International Awards	January 4, 2019	Best Actor	Bradley Cooper	Nominated	
AACTA International Awards	January 4, 2019	Best Actress	Lady Gaga	Nominated	
AACTA International Awards	January 4, 2019	Best Supporting Actor	Sam Elliott	Nominated	
AARP Movies for Grownups Awards	February 4, 2019	Best Picture	A Star Is Born	Nominated	
AARP Movies for Grownups Awards	February 4, 2019	Best Supporting Actor	Sam Elliott	Nominated	
AARP Movies for Grownups Awards	February 4, 2019	Readers' Choice Poll	A Star Is Born	Won	
Academy Awards	February 24, 2019	Best Picture	Bradley Cooper, Bill Gerber and Lynette Howell Taylor	Nominated	
Academy Awards	February 24, 2019	Best Actor	Bradley Cooper	Nominated	
Academy Awards	February 24, 2019	Best Actress	Lady Gaga	Nominated	
Academy Awards	February 24, 2019	Best Supporting Actor	Sam Elliott	Nominated	
Academy Awards	February 24, 2019	Best Adapted Screenplay	Eric Roth, Bradley Cooper and Will Fetters	Nominated	
Academy Awards	February 24, 2019	Best Cinematography	Matthew Libatique	Nominated	
Academy Awards	February 24, 2019	Best Original Song	Lady Gaga, Mark Ronson, Anthony Rossomando and Andrew Wyatt for "Shallow"	Won	
Academy Awards	February 24, 2019	Best Sound Mixing	Tom Ozanich, Dean A. Zupancic, Jason Ruder and Steven A. Morrow	Nominated	
Academy of Country Music	August 21, 2019	Tex Ritter Film Award	A Star Is Born	Won	
African-American Film Critics Association	December 11, 2018	AAFCA's Top Ten Films	A Star Is Born	Won	
Alliance of Women Film Journalists	January 10, 2019	Best Actress	Lady Gaga	Nominated	
American Cinema Editors	February 1, 2019	Best Edited Feature Film – Dramatic	Jay Cassidy	Nominated	
American Cinematheque Award	November 29, 2018	Award Honoree	Bradley Cooper	Won	
American Film Institute Awards	January 4, 2019	Top 10 Films of the Year	A Star Is Born	Won	
American Music Awards	November 24, 2019	Collaboration of the Year	"Shallow"	Nominated	
American Music Awards	November 24, 2019	Favorite Soundtrack	A Star Is Born	Nominated	
American Society of Cinematographers	February 9, 2019	Outstanding Achievement in Cinematography in Theatrical Releases	Matthew Libatique	Nominated	
APRA Music Awards	May 25, 2020	Most Performed International Work	"Shallow"	Won	
Art Directors Guild Awards	February 2, 2019	Excellence in Production Design for a Contemporary Film	Karen Murphy	Nominated	
ASCAP Pop Music Awards	June 17, 2020	Most Performed Songs	"Shallow"	Won	
Austin Film Critics Association	January 7, 2019	Best Actor	Bradley Cooper	Nominated	
Austin Film Critics Association	January 7, 2019	Best First Film	A Star Is Born	Nominated	
Australian Film Critics Association	February 15, 2019	Best International Film (English Language)	A Star Is Born	Nominated	
Billboard Music Awards	May 1, 2019	Chart Achievement	Lady Gaga and Bradley Cooper	Nominated	
Billboard Music Awards	May 1, 2019	Top Soundtrack	A Star Is Born	Nominated	
Billboard Music Awards	May 1, 2019	Top Selling Song	"Shallow"	Nominated	
BMI Film, TV & Visual Media Awards	May 15, 2019	Academy Award Honor	"Shallow"	Won	
BMI Pop Awards	July 13, 2020	Most-Performed Songs of the Year	"Shallow"	Won	
Bodil Awards	March 2, 2019	Best American Film	A Star Is Born	Nominated	
British Academy Film Awards	February 10, 2019	Best Film	A Star Is Born	Nominated	
British Academy Film Awards	February 10, 2019	Best Direction	Bradley Cooper	Nominated	
British Academy Film Awards	February 10, 2019	Best Actor in a Leading Role	Bradley Cooper	Nominated	
British Academy Film Awards	February 10, 2019	Best Actress in a Leading Role	Lady Gaga	Nominated	
British Academy Film Awards	February 10, 2019	Best Adapted Screenplay	Eric Roth, Bradley Cooper and Will Fetters	Nominated	
British Academy Film Awards	February 10, 2019	Best Film Music	Bradley Cooper, Lady Gaga and Lukas Nelson	Won	
British Academy Film Awards	February 10, 2019	Best Sound	Steven A. Morrow, Alan Robert Murray, Jason Ruder, Tom Ozanich and Dean A. Zupancic	Nominated	
BuzzAngle Music Awards	January 9, 2020	Top Soundtrack Album	A Star Is Born	Won	
Capri Hollywood International Film Festival	January 2, 2019	Best Original Song	Lady Gaga, Mark Ronson, Anthony Rossomando and Andrew Wyatt for "Shallow"	Won	
Capri Hollywood International Film Festival	January 2, 2019	Best Sound Editing	A Star Is Born	Won	
Capri Hollywood International Film Festival	January 2, 2019	Best Sound Mixing	A Star Is Born	Won	
Casting Society of America	January 31, 2019	Feature Big Budget – Drama	Mary Vernieu, Lindsay Graham and Raylin Sabo	Nominated	
Chicago Film Critics Association	December 7, 2018	Best Film	A Star Is Born	Nominated	
Chicago Film Critics Association	December 7, 2018	Best Director	Bradley Cooper	Nominated	
Chicago Film Critics Association	December 7, 2018	Best Actor	Bradley Cooper	Nominated	
Chicago Film Critics Association	December 7, 2018	Best Actress	Lady Gaga	Nominated	
Chicago Film Critics Association	December 7, 2018	Best Adapted Screenplay	Eric Roth, Bradley Cooper and Will Fetters	Nominated	
Chicago Film Critics Association	December 7, 2018	Most Promising Filmmaker	Bradley Cooper	Nominated	
Chicago Film Critics Association	December 7, 2018	Most Promising Performer	Lady Gaga	Nominated	
Cinema Audio Society Awards	February 16, 2019	Motion Picture – Live Action	Steven A. Morrow, Tom Ozanich, Dean A. Zupancic, Jason Ruder, Thomas O’Connell and Richard Duarte	Nominated	
Clio Awards	November 15, 2018	Theatrical: Trailer	A Star Is Born ("Not Alone")	Gold	
Clio Awards	November 21, 2019	Home Entertainment: Audio/Visual	A Star Is Born ("Target Wall")	Bronze	
Clio Awards	November 21, 2019	Theatrical: Audio/Visual Mixed Campaign	A Star Is Born	Grand	
Clio Awards	November 21, 2019	Theatrical: Integrated Campaign	A Star Is Born	Gold	
Clio Awards	November 21, 2019	Theatrical: Original Content	A Star Is Born ("The Road to Stardom")	Silver	
Clio Awards	November 21, 2019	Theatrical: Trailer	A Star Is Born ("Time")	Bronze	
Costume Designers Guild Awards	February 19, 2019	Excellence in Contemporary Film	Erin Benach	Nominated	
Critics' Choice Movie Awards	January 13, 2019	Best Picture	A Star Is Born	Nominated	
Critics' Choice Movie Awards	January 13, 2019	Best Actor	Bradley Cooper	Nominated	
Critics' Choice Movie Awards	January 13, 2019	Best Actress	Lady Gaga	Won (Note: Tied with Glenn Close for The Wife (2017))	
Critics' Choice Movie Awards	January 13, 2019	Best Supporting Actor	Sam Elliott	Nominated	
Critics' Choice Movie Awards	January 13, 2019	Best Director	Bradley Cooper	Nominated	
Critics' Choice Movie Awards	January 13, 2019	Best Adapted Screenplay	Eric Roth, Bradley Cooper and Will Fetters	Nominated	
Critics' Choice Movie Awards	January 13, 2019	Best Cinematography	Matthew Libatique	Nominated	
Critics' Choice Movie Awards	January 13, 2019	Best Editing	Jay Cassidy	Nominated	
Critics' Choice Movie Awards	January 13, 2019	Best Song	Lady Gaga, Mark Ronson, Anthony Rossomando and Andrew Wyatt for "Shallow"	Won	
Dallas–Fort Worth Film Critics Association	December 17, 2018	Best Film	A Star Is Born	Won	
Dallas–Fort Worth Film Critics Association	December 17, 2018	Best Director	Bradley Cooper	Runner-up	
Dallas–Fort Worth Film Critics Association	December 17, 2018	Best Actor	Bradley Cooper	3rd place	
Dallas–Fort Worth Film Critics Association	December 17, 2018	Best Actress	Lady Gaga	Runner-up	
Dallas–Fort Worth Film Critics Association	December 17, 2018	Best Supporting Actor	Sam Elliott	3rd place	
Danish Music Awards	October 17, 2019	International Hit of the Year	"Shallow"	Won	
Detroit Film Critics Society	December 3, 2018	Best Director	Bradley Cooper	Nominated	
Detroit Film Critics Society	December 3, 2018	Best Actor	Bradley Cooper	Nominated	
Detroit Film Critics Society	December 3, 2018	Best Actress	Lady Gaga	Nominated	
Detroit Film Critics Society	December 3, 2018	Best Supporting Actor	Sam Elliott	Nominated	
Detroit Film Critics Society	December 3, 2018	Best Breakthrough Performance	Lady Gaga	Nominated	
Detroit Film Critics Society	December 3, 2018	Best Use of Music	A Star Is Born	Won	
Digital Spy Reader Awards	December 30, 2018	Best Female Actor	Lady Gaga	Won	
Digital Spy Reader Awards	December 30, 2018	Best Song	"Shallow"	Won	
Directors Guild of America Awards	February 2, 2019	Outstanding Directing – Feature Film	Bradley Cooper	Nominated	
Directors Guild of America Awards	February 2, 2019	Outstanding Directing – First-Time Feature Film	Bradley Cooper	Nominated	
Dorian Awards	January 12, 2019	Film of the Year	A Star Is Born	Nominated	
Dorian Awards	January 12, 2019	Film Performance of the Year — Actress	Lady Gaga	Nominated	
Dorian Awards	January 12, 2019	Film Performance of the Year — Actor	Bradley Cooper	Nominated	
Dorian Awards	January 12, 2019	Film Performance of the Year — Supporting Actor	Sam Elliott	Nominated	
Dorian Awards	January 12, 2019	Wilde Artist of the Year	Bradley Cooper	Nominated	
Dorian Awards	January 12, 2019	Wilde Artist of the Year	Lady Gaga	Nominated	
Dorian Awards	January 8, 2020	TV Musical Performance of the Year	"Shallow" at the 91st Academy Awards	Won	
Dublin Film Critics' Circle	December 20, 2018	Best Film	A Star Is Born	Won	
Dublin Film Critics' Circle	December 20, 2018	Best Actor	Bradley Cooper	Won	
Dublin Film Critics' Circle	December 20, 2018	Best Actress	Lady Gaga	Won	
Dublin Film Critics' Circle	December 20, 2018	Best Director	Bradley Cooper	3rd place	
Florida Film Critics Circle	December 21, 2018	Best First Film	A Star Is Born	Nominated	
Fryderyk	March 12, 2019	Best Foreign Album	A Star Is Born	Nominated	
GAFFA Awards (Denmark)	February 26, 2020	International Hit of the Year	"Shallow"	Nominated	
GAFFA Awards (Norway)	January 21, 2019	International Song of the Year	"Shallow"	Nominated	
GAFFA Awards (Sweden)	February 21, 2019	International Song of the Year	"Shallow"	Won	
Gaygalan Awards	February 4, 2019	Song of the Year	"Shallow"	Won	
Georgia Film Critics Association	January 12, 2019	Best Picture	A Star Is Born	Won	
Georgia Film Critics Association	January 12, 2019	Best Director	Bradley Cooper	Nominated	
Georgia Film Critics Association	January 12, 2019	Best Actor	Bradley Cooper	Nominated	
Georgia Film Critics Association	January 12, 2019	Best Actress	Lady Gaga	Nominated	
Georgia Film Critics Association	January 12, 2019	Best Supporting Actor	Sam Elliott	Won	
Georgia Film Critics Association	January 12, 2019	Best Adapted Screenplay	Eric Roth, Bradley Cooper and Will Fetters	Nominated	
Georgia Film Critics Association	January 12, 2019	Best Original Song	Jason Isbell for "Maybe It's Time"	Nominated	
Georgia Film Critics Association	January 12, 2019	Best Original Song	Lady Gaga, Mark Ronson, Anthony Rossomando and Andrew Wyatt for "Shallow"	Won	
Georgia Film Critics Association	January 12, 2019	Breakthrough Award	Lady Gaga	Nominated	
Global Awards	March 7, 2019	Best Song	"Shallow"	Nominated	
Golden Eagle Awards	January 25, 2019	Best Foreign Language Film	A Star Is Born	Nominated	
Golden Globe Awards	January 6, 2019	Best Motion Picture – Drama	A Star Is Born	Nominated	
Golden Globe Awards	January 6, 2019	Best Director	Bradley Cooper	Nominated	
Golden Globe Awards	January 6, 2019	Best Actor – Motion Picture Drama	Bradley Cooper	Nominated	
Golden Globe Awards	January 6, 2019	Best Actress – Motion Picture Drama	Lady Gaga	Nominated	
Golden Globe Awards	January 6, 2019	Best Original Song	Lady Gaga, Mark Ronson, Anthony Rossomando and Andrew Wyatt for "Shallow"	Won	
Golden Schmoes Awards	February 23, 2019	Most Overrated Movie of the Year	A Star Is Born	Nominated	
Golden Schmoes Awards	February 23, 2019	Best Actor of the Year	Bradley Cooper	Nominated	
Golden Schmoes Awards	February 23, 2019	Best Actress of the Year	Lady Gaga	Runner-up	
Golden Schmoes Awards	February 23, 2019	Breakthrough Performance of the Year	Lady Gaga	Runner-up	
Golden Schmoes Awards	February 23, 2019	Best Supporting Actor of the Year	Sam Elliott	Nominated	
Golden Schmoes Awards	February 23, 2019	Best Music in a Movie	A Star Is Born	Runner-up	
Golden Schmoes Awards	February 23, 2019	Best T&A of the Year	Lady Gaga	Nominated	
Golden Tomato Awards	January 11, 2019	Best Movie 2018: Wide Release	A Star Is Born	5th place	
Golden Tomato Awards	January 11, 2019	Best Directorial Debut 2018	A Star Is Born	Won	
Golden Tomato Awards	January 11, 2019	Best Musical/Music Movie 2018	A Star Is Born	Won	
Golden Tomato Awards	January 11, 2019	Fans' Choice: Favorite Movie 2018	A Star Is Born	Runner-up	
Golden Trailer Awards	May 29, 2019	Best Drama	A Star Is Born ("Not Alone")	Won	
Golden Trailer Awards	May 29, 2019	Best Music	A Star Is Born ("Not Alone")	Nominated	
Golden Trailer Awards	May 29, 2019	Best Romance	A Star Is Born ("Not Alone")	Won	
Golden Trailer Awards	May 29, 2019	Best Romance	A Star Is Born ("Beautiful")	Nominated	
Golden Trailer Awards	May 29, 2019	The Don LaFontane Award for Best Voice Over	A Star Is Born ("Time")	Nominated	
Golden Trailer Awards	May 29, 2019	Best Home Ent Drama	A Star Is Born ("Target Showcase Wall")	Nominated	
Golden Trailer Awards	May 29, 2019	Best Drama TV Spot (for a Feature Film)	A Star Is Born ("A Way Out")	Won	
Golden Trailer Awards	May 29, 2019	Best Music TV Spot (for a Feature Film)	A Star Is Born ("12 Notes")	Won	
Golden Trailer Awards	May 29, 2019	Best Music TV Spot (for a Feature Film)	A Star Is Born ("Life")	Nominated	
Golden Trailer Awards	May 29, 2019	Best Romance TV Spot (for a Feature Film)	A Star Is Born ("Life")	Nominated	
Golden Trailer Awards	May 29, 2019	Best Drama Poster	A Star Is Born	Nominated	
Golden Trailer Awards	May 29, 2019	Best Radio/Audio Spot (All Genres)	A Star Is Born ("Experience")	Won	
Grammy Awards	February 10, 2019	Record of the Year	Lady Gaga, Bradley Cooper, Benjamin Rice, Tom Elmhirst and Randy Merrill for "Shallow"	Nominated	
Grammy Awards	February 10, 2019	Song of the Year	Lady Gaga, Mark Ronson, Anthony Rossomando and Andrew Wyatt for "Shallow"	Nominated	
Grammy Awards	February 10, 2019	Best Pop Duo/Group Performance	Lady Gaga and Bradley Cooper for "Shallow"	Won	
Grammy Awards	February 10, 2019	Best Song Written for Visual Media	Lady Gaga, Mark Ronson, Anthony Rossomando and Andrew Wyatt for "Shallow"	Won	
Grammy Awards	January 26, 2020	Song of the Year	Natalie Hemby, Lady Gaga, Hillary Lindsey and Lori McKenna for "Always Remember Us This Way"	Nominated	
Grammy Awards	January 26, 2020	Best Compilation Soundtrack for Visual Media	A Star Is Born	Won	
Grammy Awards	January 26, 2020	Best Song Written for Visual Media	Natalie Hemby, Lady Gaga, Hillary Lindsey and Aaron Raitiere for "I'll Never Love Again" (Film Version)	Won	
Grande Prêmio do Cinema Brasileiro	August 14, 2019	Best Foreign Feature Film (People's Choice)	A Star Is Born	Won	
Grands Prix Sacem	December 2, 2019	International Work of the Year	"Shallow"	Won	
Guild of Music Supervisors Awards	February 13, 2019	Best Music Supervision for Films Budgeted Over $25 Million	Julianne Jordan and Julia Michels	Won	
Guild of Music Supervisors Awards	February 13, 2019	Best Song/Recording Created for a Film	"Shallow"	Won	
Hito Music Awards	June 2, 2019	Western Songs of the Year	"Shallow"	Won	
Hollywood Critics Association	January 9, 2019	Best Picture	A Star Is Born	Nominated	
Hollywood Critics Association	January 9, 2019	Best Actor	Bradley Cooper	Nominated	
Hollywood Critics Association	January 9, 2019	Best Actress	Lady Gaga	Nominated	
Hollywood Critics Association	January 9, 2019	Best Supporting Actor	Sam Elliott	Nominated	
Hollywood Critics Association	January 9, 2019	Best Adapted Screenplay	Bradley Cooper and Eric Roth	Nominated	
Hollywood Critics Association	January 9, 2019	Best Male Director	Bradley Cooper	Nominated	
Hollywood Critics Association	January 9, 2019	Best First Feature	Bradley Cooper	Nominated	
Hollywood Critics Association	January 9, 2019	Best Breakthrough Performance	Lady Gaga	Nominated	
Hollywood Critics Association	January 9, 2019	Best Original Song	"Shallow"	Won	
Hollywood Film Awards	November 4, 2018	Hollywood Cinematography Award	Matthew Libatique	Won	
Hollywood Music in Media Awards	November 14, 2018	Best Original Song – Feature Film	Lady Gaga, Mark Ronson, Anthony Rossomando and Andrew Wyatt for "Shallow"	Won	
Hollywood Music in Media Awards	November 14, 2018	Outstanding Music Supervision – Film	Julianne Jordan and Julia Michels	Won	
Hollywood Music in Media Awards	November 14, 2018	Best Soundtrack Album	A Star Is Born	Nominated	
Hollywood Professional Association	November 21, 2019	Outstanding Editing – Theatrical Feature	Jay Cassidy	Nominated	
Houston Film Critics Society	January 3, 2019	Best Picture	A Star Is Born	Nominated	
Houston Film Critics Society	January 3, 2019	Best Director	Bradley Cooper	Nominated	
Houston Film Critics Society	January 3, 2019	Best Actor	Bradley Cooper	Nominated	
Houston Film Critics Society	January 3, 2019	Best Actress	Lady Gaga	Nominated	
Houston Film Critics Society	January 3, 2019	Best Original Song	Lady Gaga, Mark Ronson, Anthony Rossomando and Andrew Wyatt for "Shallow"	Won	
Hungarian Music Awards	April 5, 2019	Foreign Pop-Rock Album of the Year	A Star Is Born	Won	
IGN Awards	December 21, 2018	Best Movie of the Year	A Star Is Born	Nominated	
IGN Awards	December 21, 2018	Best Lead Performance in a Movie	Bradley Cooper	Nominated	
IGN Awards	December 21, 2018	Best Lead Performance in a Movie	Lady Gaga	Runner-up	
IGN Awards	December 21, 2018	Best Supporting Performance in a Movie	Sam Elliott	Nominated	
IGN Awards	December 21, 2018	Best Director of a Movie	Bradley Cooper	Nominated	
IGN Awards	December 21, 2018	Best Drama Movie	A Star Is Born	Won	
iHeartRadio Music Awards	March 14, 2019	Song That Left Us Shook	"I'll Never Love Again"	Won	
IndieWire Critics Poll	December 17, 2018	Best Supporting Actor	Sam Elliott	5th place	
IndieWire Critics Poll	December 17, 2018	Best First Feature	A Star Is Born	4th place	
International Film Festival of the Art of Cinematography Camerimage	November 10, 2018	Main Competition (Golden Frog)	Matthew Libatique	Nominated	
Jupiter Awards	March 27, 2019	Best International Film	A Star Is Born	Nominated	
Jupiter Awards	March 27, 2019	Best International Actress	Lady Gaga	Nominated	
Las Vegas Film Critics Society	December 14, 2018	Top 10 Films	A Star Is Born	Runner-up	
Las Vegas Film Critics Society	December 14, 2018	Best Actress	Lady Gaga	Won	
Las Vegas Film Critics Society	December 14, 2018	Best Supporting Actor	Sam Elliott	Won	
Las Vegas Film Critics Society	December 14, 2018	Best Song	"Shallow"	Won	
Las Vegas Film Critics Society	December 14, 2018	Breakout Filmmaker (Director)	Bradley Cooper	Won	
Las Vegas Film Critics Society	December 14, 2018	The William Holden Lifetime Achievement Award	Sam Elliott	Won	
Los Angeles Italia Film Festival	February 17, 2019	Best Sound Editor and Sound Mixers	Alan Robert Murray, Tom Ozanich, Jason Ruder and Dean A. Zupancic	Won	
Make-Up Artists and Hair Stylists Guild Awards	February 16, 2019	Best Contemporary Make-Up in a Feature-Length Motion Picture	Ve Neill, Debbie Zoller, Sarah Tanno	Won	
Make-Up Artists and Hair Stylists Guild Awards	February 16, 2019	Best Contemporary Hair Styling in a Feature-Length Motion Picture	Lori McCoy-Bell, Joy Zapata, Frederic Aspiras	Nominated	
MPSE Golden Reel Awards	February 17, 2019	Feature Film – Musical	A Star Is Born	Nominated	
MPSE Golden Reel Awards	February 17, 2019	Feature Film – Dialogue / ADR	A Star Is Born	Nominated	
MTV Millennial Awards	June 23, 2019	Global Hit	"Shallow"	Nominated	
MTV Millennial Awards Brazil	July 3, 2019	Global Hit	"Shallow"	Won	
MTV Millennial Awards Brazil	July 3, 2019	Ship of the Year	Lady Gaga and Bradley Cooper	Nominated	
MTV Movie & TV Awards	June 17, 2019	Best Performance in a Movie	Lady Gaga	Won	
MTV Movie & TV Awards	June 17, 2019	Best Musical Moment	"Shallow"	Won	
MTV Video Music Awards	August 26, 2019	Song of the Year	"Shallow"	Nominated	
MTV Video Music Awards	August 26, 2019	Best Collaboration	"Shallow"	Nominated	
MTV Video Play Awards	December 11, 2019	Top 20 Most Played Music Videos	"Shallow"	Won	
National Board of Review Awards	November 27, 2018	Top Ten Films	A Star Is Born	Won	
National Board of Review Awards	November 27, 2018	Best Actress	Lady Gaga	Won	
National Board of Review Awards	November 27, 2018	Best Director	Bradley Cooper	Won	
National Board of Review Awards	November 27, 2018	Best Supporting Actor	Sam Elliott	Won	
National Film Awards UK	March 27, 2019	Best International Film	A Star Is Born	Nominated	
New Music Awards	March 16, 2019	AC Single of the Year	"Shallow"	Won	
New Music Awards	March 16, 2019	AC New Group of the Year	Lady Gaga and Bradley Cooper	Won	
New York Film Critics Online Awards	December 9, 2018	Top 10 Films	A Star Is Born	Won	
NRJ Music Awards	November 9, 2019	International Duo/Group of the Year	Lady Gaga and Bradley Cooper	Won	
OGAE Song Contest	November 9, 2019	Song Contest Award	"Shallow"	2nd place	
Online Film Critics Society	January 2, 2019	Best Picture	A Star Is Born	10th place	
Online Film Critics Society	January 2, 2019	Best Actor	Bradley Cooper	Nominated	
Online Film Critics Society	January 2, 2019	Best Actress	Lady Gaga	Nominated	
Online Film Critics Society	January 2, 2019	Best Debut Feature	Bradley Cooper	Nominated	
Online Film Critics Society	January 2, 2019	Best Original Songs	A Star Is Born	Won	
Palm Springs International Film Festival	January 3, 2019	Director of the Year	Bradley Cooper	Won	
Phoenix Film Critics Society	December 18, 2018	Top 10 Films	A Star Is Born	Won	
Phoenix Film Critics Society	December 18, 2018	Best Actress in a Leading Role	Lady Gaga	Won	
Phoenix Film Critics Society	December 18, 2018	Best Original Song	"Shallow"	Won	
Producers Guild of America Awards	January 19, 2019	Best Theatrical Motion Picture	Bill Gerber, Bradley Cooper and Lynette Howell Taylor	Nominated	
Promax Awards	June 6, 2019	"Behind the Scenes" Promo	A Star Is Born	Gold	
Queerties Awards	February 27, 2019	Blockbuster	A Star Is Born	Nominated	
Robert Awards	February 3, 2019	Best American Film	A Star Is Born	Nominated	
Rockbjörnen	August 13, 2019	Foreign Song of the Year	"Shallow"	Won	
Rockol Awards	January 17, 2019	Best International Album (Critics)	A Star Is Born	Won	
Rockol Awards	January 17, 2019	Best International Album (Public)	A Star Is Born	Won	
RTHK International Pop Poll Awards	May 10, 2019	Top Ten International Gold Songs	"Shallow"	Won	
RTHK International Pop Poll Awards	May 10, 2019	Super Gold Song	"Shallow"	Won	
RTHK International Pop Poll Awards	May 10, 2019	The Best Selling Soundtrack Album	A Star Is Born	Won	
San Diego Film Critics Society	December 10, 2018	Best Actress	Lady Gaga	Nominated	
San Diego Film Critics Society	December 10, 2018	Best Supporting Actor	Sam Elliott	Nominated	
San Diego Film Critics Society	December 10, 2018	Best Use of Music in a Film	A Star Is Born	Nominated	
San Francisco Bay Area Film Critics Circle	December 9, 2018	Best Actress	Lady Gaga	Nominated	
Santa Barbara International Film Festival	February 5, 2019	Virtuosos Award	Sam Elliott	Won	
Satellite Awards	February 17, 2019	Best Motion Picture – Comedy/Musical	A Star Is Born	Won	
Satellite Awards	February 17, 2019	Best Director	Bradley Cooper	Nominated	
Satellite Awards	February 17, 2019	Best Actor in a Motion Picture, Comedy/Musical	Bradley Cooper	Nominated	
Satellite Awards	February 17, 2019	Best Actress in a Motion Picture, Comedy/Musical	Lady Gaga	Nominated	
Satellite Awards	February 17, 2019	Best Supporting Actor	Sam Elliott	Nominated	
Satellite Awards	February 17, 2019	Best Adapted Screenplay	Bradley Cooper and Eric Roth	Nominated	
Satellite Awards	February 17, 2019	Best Film Editing	Jay Cassidy	Nominated	
Satellite Awards	February 17, 2019	Best Cinematography	Matthew Libatique	Won	
Satellite Awards	February 17, 2019	Best Original Song	Lady Gaga, Mark Ronson, Anthony Rossomando and Andrew Wyatt for "Shallow"	Won	
Satellite Awards	February 17, 2019	Best Costume Design	Erin Benach	Nominated	
Satellite Awards	February 17, 2019	Best Sound (Editing and Mixing)	A Star Is Born	Nominated	
Screen Actors Guild Awards	January 27, 2019	Outstanding Performance by a Cast in a Motion Picture	Dave Chappelle, Andrew Dice Clay, Bradley Cooper, Sam Elliott, Rafi Gavron, Lady Gaga and Anthony Ramos	Nominated	
Screen Actors Guild Awards	January 27, 2019	Outstanding Performance by a Male Actor in a Leading Role	Bradley Cooper	Nominated	
Screen Actors Guild Awards	January 27, 2019	Outstanding Performance by a Female Actor in a Leading Role	Lady Gaga	Nominated	
Screen Actors Guild Awards	January 27, 2019	Outstanding Performance by a Male Actor in a Supporting Role	Sam Elliott	Nominated	
Seattle Film Critics Society	December 17, 2018	Best Picture	A Star Is Born	Nominated	
Seattle Film Critics Society	December 17, 2018	Best Director	Bradley Cooper	Nominated	
Seattle Film Critics Society	December 17, 2018	Best Actor	Bradley Cooper	Nominated	
Seattle Film Critics Society	December 17, 2018	Best Actress	Lady Gaga	Nominated	
Society of Camera Operators	January 26, 2019	Camera Operator of the Year	P. Scott Sakamoto	Won	
Southeastern Film Critics Association	December 17, 2018	Top 10 Films	A Star Is Born	3rd place	
Southeastern Film Critics Association	December 17, 2018	Best Actress	Lady Gaga	Runner-up	
Southeastern Film Critics Association	December 17, 2018	Best Director	Bradley Cooper	Runner-up	
St. Louis Film Critics Association	December 16, 2018	Best Film	A Star Is Born	Won	
St. Louis Film Critics Association	December 16, 2018	Best Director	Bradley Cooper	Nominated	
St. Louis Film Critics Association	December 16, 2018	Best Actor	Bradley Cooper	Nominated	
St. Louis Film Critics Association	December 16, 2018	Best Actress	Lady Gaga	Runner-up	
St. Louis Film Critics Association	December 16, 2018	Best Adapted Screenplay	Eric Roth, Bradley Cooper and Will Fetters	Nominated	
St. Louis Film Critics Association	December 16, 2018	Best Cinematography	Matthew Libatique	Nominated	
St. Louis Film Critics Association	December 16, 2018	Best Editing	Jay Cassidy	Nominated	
St. Louis Film Critics Association	December 16, 2018	Best Soundtrack	A Star Is Born	Nominated	
Swiss Music Awards	February 28, 2020	Best International Hit	"Shallow"	Won	
TEC Awards	January 18, 2020	Film Sound Production	A Star Is Born	Nominated	
TEC Awards	January 18, 2020	Record Production/Album	A Star Is Born	Won	
TEC Awards	January 18, 2020	Record Production/Single or Track	"Always Remember Us This Way"	Nominated	
Teen Choice Awards	August 11, 2019	Choice Drama Movie Actor	Bradley Cooper	Nominated	
Teen Choice Awards	August 11, 2019	Choice Drama Movie Actress	Lady Gaga	Nominated	
Teen Choice Awards	August 11, 2019	Choice Collaboration	"Shallow"	Nominated	
Teen Choice Awards	August 11, 2019	Choice Song from a Movie	"Shallow"	Nominated	
Teen Choice Awards	August 11, 2019	Choice Ship	Lady Gaga and Bradley Cooper	Nominated	
Venice Film Festival	September 8, 2018	Smithers Foundation Award	A Star Is Born	Won	
Washington D.C. Area Film Critics Association	December 3, 2018	Best Film	A Star Is Born	Nominated	
Washington D.C. Area Film Critics Association	December 3, 2018	Best Director	Bradley Cooper	Nominated	
Washington D.C. Area Film Critics Association	December 3, 2018	Best Actor	Bradley Cooper	Won	
Washington D.C. Area Film Critics Association	December 3, 2018	Best Actress	Lady Gaga	Won	
Washington D.C. Area Film Critics Association	December 3, 2018	Best Supporting Actor	Sam Elliott	Nominated	
Washington D.C. Area Film Critics Association	December 3, 2018	Best Adapted Screenplay	Eric Roth, Bradley Cooper and Will Fetters	Nominated	
Washington D.C. Area Film Critics Association	December 3, 2018	Best Cinematography	Matthew Libatique	Nominated	
Washington D.C. Area Film Critics Association	December 3, 2018	Best Editing	Jay Cassidy	Nominated	
Webby Awards	May 13, 2019	Music Video (Video)	"Shallow"	Nominated	
Webby Awards	May 13, 2019	Trailer (Video)	A Star Is Born	Won	
Women Film Critics Circle	December 11, 2018	Best Screen Couple	Bradley Cooper and Lady Gaga	Nominated	
World Soundtrack Awards	October 18, 2019	Best Original Song Written Directly for a Film	Lady Gaga, Mark Ronson, Anthony Rossomando and Andrew Wyatt for "Shallow"	Won	
WOWIE Awards	December 6, 2018	Best Meme/Gif	A Star Is Born "Hey" Meme	Nominated	
WOWIE Awards	December 6, 2018	Best Red Carpet Looks	Lady Gaga for A Star Is Born	Nominated	
WOWIE Awards	December 6, 2018	Best Red Carpet Looks	Shangela for A Star Is Born	Won	
Writers Guild of America Awards	February 17, 2019	Best Adapted Screenplay	Eric Roth, Bradley Cooper and Will Fetters	Nominated	

== See also ==
- 2018 in film
- 2018 in music
- Bradley Cooper awards and nominations
- Lady Gaga awards and nominations
