= List of accolades received by Joker (2019 film) =

Joker accolades
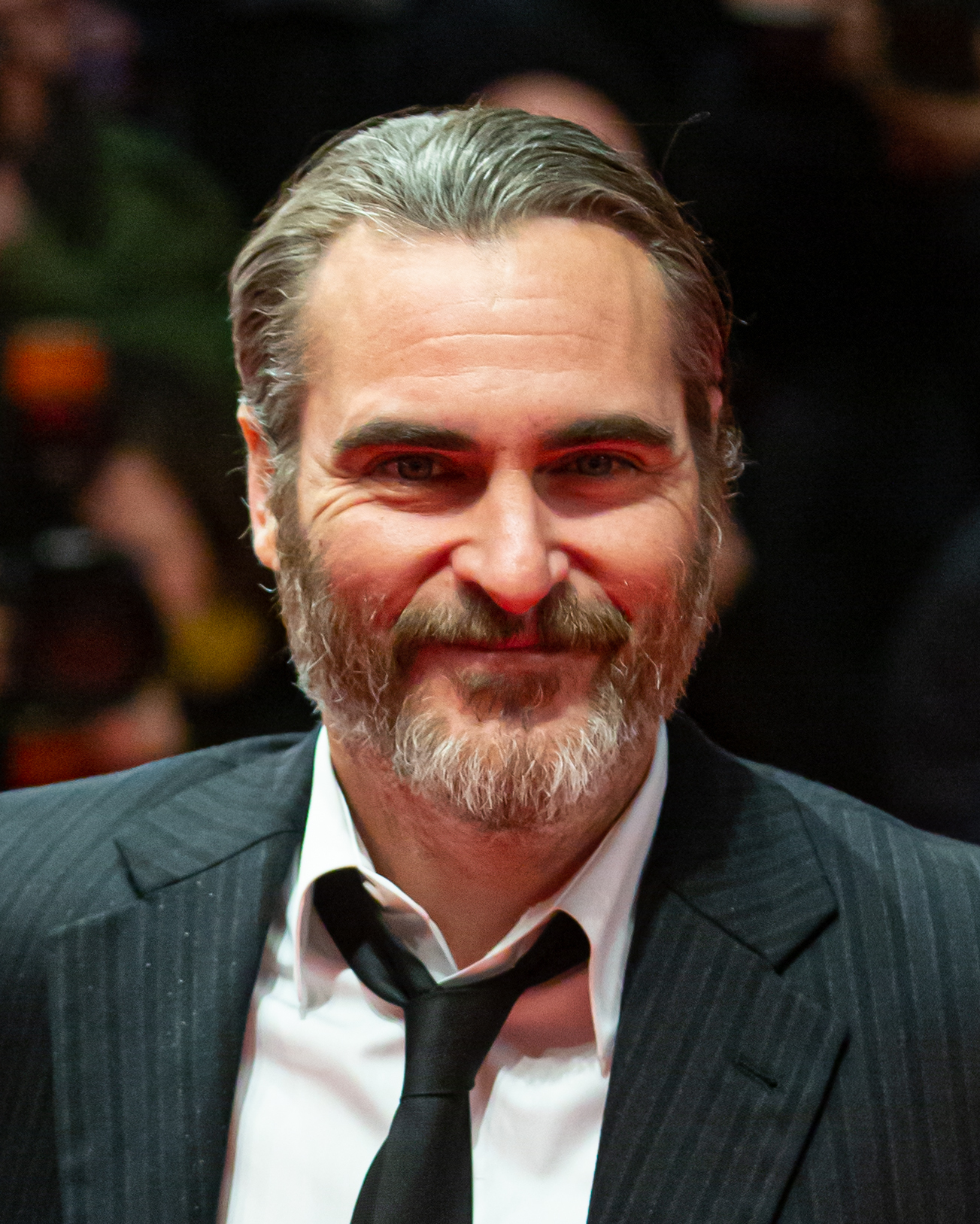
- Joaquin Phoenix's performance as the Joker garnered critical acclaim and he received numerous accolades, including the Academy Award for Best Actor.
Accolades
Award	Wins	Nominations
AACTA International Awards	0	4
AARP Movies for Grownups Awards	0	1
Academy Awards	2	11
AFCA Film Awards	0	1
Alliance of Women Film Journalists EDA Awards	0	1
Amanda Awards	1	1
American Cinema Editors Eddie Awards	0	1
American Film Institute Awards	1	1
American Society of Cinematographers Awards	0	1
Art Directors Guild Awards	0	1
Artios Awards	0	1
Belgian Film Critics Association Awards	0	1
Blue Ribbon Awards	1	1
BMI Film & TV Awards	2	2
Bodil Awards	0	1
Boston Society of Film Critics Awards	1	1
British Academy Film Awards	3	11
British Society of Cinematographers Awards	1	2
Cahiers du Cinéma	1	1
Camerimage Awards	2	2
Capri Hollywood International Film Festival Awards	1	1
César Awards	0	1
Chicago Film Critics Association Awards	0	1
Cinema Audio Society Awards	0	1
Clio Awards	1	1
Critics' Choice Movie Awards	2	7
Dallas–Fort Worth Film Critics Association Awards	1	1
David di Donatello Awards	0	1
Detroit Film Critics Society Awards	0	1
Dorian Awards	0	1
Dragon Awards	0	1
Dublin Film Critics' Circle Awards	4	4
Florida Film Critics Circle Awards	0	2
Georgia Film Critics Association Awards	0	3
Globes de Cristal Awards	0	1
Golden Globe Awards	2	4
Golden Raspberry Awards	0	1
Golden Reel Awards	0	3
Golden Trailer Awards	1	5
Grammy Awards	1	2
Grande Prêmio do Cinema Brasileiro	0	1
Guild of Music Supervisors Awards	1	1
Guinness World Records	2	2
Harvey Awards	0	1
Hochi Film Awards	1	1
Hollywood Critics Association Awards	2	7
Hollywood Music in Media Awards	1	1
Hollywood Professional Association Awards	1	3
Houston Film Critics Society Awards	0	4
Huading Awards	1	3
ICG Publicists Awards	1	1
IndieWire Critics Poll	6	6
International Cinephile Society Awards	0	2
International Film Music Critics Association Awards	0	4
Japan Academy Film Prize	1	1
Jupiter Awards	0	2
Kinema Junpo Awards	4	4
London Film Critics' Circle Awards	1	2
Mainichi Film Awards	2	2
Make-Up Artists and Hair Stylists Guild Awards	1	2
New York Film Critics Online Awards	2	2
Nikkan Sports Film Awards	0	1
NME Awards	0	2
Online Film Critics Society Awards	0	2
Palm Springs International Film Festival Awards	2	2
Producers Guild of America Awards	0	1
Robert Awards	1	1
Rondo Hatton Classic Horror Awards	1	1
San Diego Film Critics Society Awards	1	4
San Francisco Bay Area Film Critics Circle Awards	0	2
Sant Jordi Awards	0	1
Satellite Awards	2	10
Saturn Awards	1	5
Screen Actors Guild Awards	1	2
Seattle Film Critics Society Awards	0	3
SOC Awards	1	1
Society of Composers & Lyricists Awards	1	1
St. Louis Film Critics Association Awards	1	3
Taurus World Stunt Awards	1	1
TEC Awards	0	1
TIFF Tribute Awards	1	1
Turkish Film Critics Association Awards	1	1
Vancouver Film Critics Circle Awards	0	1
Venice International Film Festival Awards	3	3
Visual Effects Society Awards	0	1
Washington D.C. Area Film Critics Association Awards	0	3
Women Film Critics Circle Awards	2	2
World Soundtrack Awards	1	1
Writers Guild of America Awards	0	1

Totals (Note: Certain award groups do not simply award one winner. They acknowledge several different recipients, have runners-up, and have third place. Since this is a specific recognition and is different from losing an award, runner-up mentions are considered wins in this award tally. For simplification and to avoid errors, each award in this list has been presumed to have had a prior nomination.)
- Wins: 76
- Nominations: 198

Joker is a 2019 American psychological thriller film directed by Todd Phillips, who co-wrote the screenplay with Scott Silver. The film was produced by Warner Bros. Pictures, DC Films, and Joint Effort Productions, in association with Bron Creative and Village Roadshow Pictures. It follows Arthur Fleck, a failed stand-up comedian whose descent into mental illness, nihilism and crime inspires a violent countercultural revolution against the wealthy in a decaying Gotham City during the early 1980s recession. The film is loosely based on DC Comics characters and stars Joaquin Phoenix as Fleck (the Joker), with Robert De Niro, Zazie Beetz, Frances Conroy, Brett Cullen, Glenn Fleshler, Leigh Gill, Bill Camp and Shea Whigham in supporting roles.

Joker premiered at the 76th Venice International Film Festival on August 31, 2019, where it received an eight-minute standing ovation and won the Golden Lion. It was released theatrically in several markets on October 3, and in the United States and United Kingdom on October 4. Produced on a budget of $55 million, the film grossed $1.079 billion worldwide, becoming the highest grossing R-rated film of all time, (Note: It was surpassed by Deadpool & Wolverine in 2024.) the first R-rated film to surpass $1 billion at the box office, and the sixth-highest-grossing film of 2019. Critical reception was polarized, with praise for the screenplay, musical score, cinematography and Phoenix's performance, and some criticism directed at its dark tone, portrayal of mental illness and depiction of violence. The latter also drew concerns of inspiring real-life violence. On the review aggregator website Rotten Tomatoes, the film holds an approval rating of 68% based on 598 reviews.

Joker garnered awards and nominations in various categories, with particular recognition for Phoenix's performance, Hildur Guðnadóttir's musical score, Phillips's screenplay, and Lawrence Sher's cinematography. At the 92nd Academy Awards, the film earned 11 nominations, the most of any film at the ceremony, and won Best Actor (Phoenix) and Best Original Score (Guðnadóttir). It received a further 11 nominations at the 73rd British Academy Film Awards, winning Best Actor in a Leading Role (Phoenix), Best Original Music (Guðnadóttir) and Best Casting. Phoenix and Guðnadóttir also won Best Actor and Best Score at the 25th Critics' Choice Awards, where the film earned seven nominations, as well as Best Actor in a Motion Picture – Drama and Best Original Score at the 77th Golden Globe Awards, where the film received four nominations. At the 63rd Annual Grammy Awards, Guðnadóttir was nominated for Best Arrangement, Instrumental or A Cappella and won Best Score Soundtrack for Visual Media. In addition, Joker was selected as one of the Top 10 Films of 2019 by the American Film Institute.

== Accolades ==
Accolades received by Joker
Award	Date of ceremony	Category	Recipient(s)	Result	Ref.
AACTA International Awards	January 3, 2020	Best Film	Joker	Nominated	
AACTA International Awards	January 3, 2020	Best Direction	Todd Phillips	Nominated	
AACTA International Awards	January 3, 2020	Best Screenplay	Todd Phillips and Scott Silver	Nominated	
AACTA International Awards	January 3, 2020	Best Actor	Joaquin Phoenix	Nominated	
AARP Movies for Grownups Awards	January 11, 2020	Readers’ Choice	Joker	Nominated	
Academy Awards	February 9, 2020	Best Picture	Bradley Cooper, Todd Phillips and Emma Tillinger Koskoff	Nominated	
Academy Awards	February 9, 2020	Best Director	Todd Phillips	Nominated	
Academy Awards	February 9, 2020	Best Actor	Joaquin Phoenix	Won	
Academy Awards	February 9, 2020	Best Adapted Screenplay	Todd Phillips and Scott Silver	Nominated	
Academy Awards	February 9, 2020	Best Cinematography	Lawrence Sher	Nominated	
Academy Awards	February 9, 2020	Best Costume Design	Mark Bridges	Nominated	
Academy Awards	February 9, 2020	Best Film Editing	Jeff Groth	Nominated	
Academy Awards	February 9, 2020	Best Makeup and Hairstyling	Nicki Ledermann and Kay Georgiou	Nominated	
Academy Awards	February 9, 2020	Best Original Score	Hildur Guðnadóttir	Won	
Academy Awards	February 9, 2020	Best Sound Editing	Alan Robert Murray	Nominated	
Academy Awards	February 9, 2020	Best Sound Mixing	Tom Ozanich, Dean Zupancic, Tod Maitland	Nominated	
Alliance of Women Film Journalists EDA Awards	January 10, 2020	Best Actor	Joaquin Phoenix	Nominated	
AFCA Film Awards	February 7, 2020	Best International Film (English Language)	Joker	Nominated	
Amanda Awards	August 14, 2020	Best Foreign Feature Film	Joker	Won	
American Cinema Editors Eddie Awards	January 17, 2020	Best Edited Feature Film – Dramatic	Jeff Groth	Nominated	
American Film Institute Awards	January 3, 2020	Top 10 Films of the Year	Joker	Won (Note: This award does not have a single winner, but recognizes multiple films.)	
American Society of Cinematographers Awards	January 25, 2020	Outstanding Achievement in Cinematography in Theatrical Releases	Lawrence Sher	Nominated	
Art Directors Guild Awards	February 1, 2020	Excellence in Production Design for a Period Film	Mark Friedberg	Nominated	
Artios Awards	January 30, 2020	Feature Big Budget – Drama	Shayna Markowitz	Nominated	
Belgian Film Critics Association Awards	January 4, 2020	Grand Prix	Joker	Nominated	
Blue Ribbon Awards	February 18, 2020	Best Foreign Film	Joker	Won	
BMI Film & TV Awards	June 15, 2020	BMI Film Music	Hildur Guðnadóttir	Won	
BMI Film & TV Awards	June 15, 2020	Special Recognition (Note: For her Best Original Score win at the 92nd Academy Awards)	Hildur Guðnadóttir	Won	
Bodil Awards	February 29, 2020	Best American Film	Joker	Nominated	
Boston Society of Film Critics Awards	December 15, 2019	Best Actor	Joaquin Phoenix	Runner-up	
British Academy Film Awards	February 2, 2020	Best Film	Bradley Cooper, Todd Phillips and Emma Tillinger Koskoff	Nominated	
British Academy Film Awards	February 2, 2020	Best Direction	Todd Phillips	Nominated	
British Academy Film Awards	February 2, 2020	Best Adapted Screenplay	Todd Phillips and Scott Silver	Nominated	
British Academy Film Awards	February 2, 2020	Best Actor in a Leading Role	Joaquin Phoenix	Won	
British Academy Film Awards	February 2, 2020	Best Original Score	Hildur Guðnadóttir	Won	
British Academy Film Awards	February 2, 2020	Best Casting	Shayna Markowitz	Won	
British Academy Film Awards	February 2, 2020	Best Cinematography	Lawrence Sher	Nominated	
British Academy Film Awards	February 2, 2020	Best Editing	Jeff Groth	Nominated	
British Academy Film Awards	February 2, 2020	Best Production Design	Mark Friedberg and Kris Moran	Nominated	
British Academy Film Awards	February 2, 2020	Best Makeup and Hair	Kay Georgiou and Nicki Ledermann	Nominated	
British Academy Film Awards	February 2, 2020	Best Sound	Tod Maitland, Alan Robert Murray, Tom Ozanich and Dean Zupancic	Nominated	
British Society of Cinematographers Awards	February 16, 2020	Best Cinematography in a Theatrical Feature Film	Lawrence Sher	Nominated	
British Society of Cinematographers Awards	February 16, 2020	Feature Operators Award	Geoffrey Haley	Won	
Cahiers du Cinéma	January 6, 2020	Top 10 Films	Joker	9th Place	
Camerimage Awards	November 16, 2019	Golden Frog	Lawrence Sher	Won	
Camerimage Awards	November 16, 2019	Audience Award	Lawrence Sher	Won	
Capri Hollywood International Film Festival Awards	January 2, 2020	Best Actor	Joaquin Phoenix	Won	
César Awards	February 28, 2020	Best Foreign Film	Joker	Nominated	
Chicago Film Critics Association Awards	December 14, 2019	Best Actor	Joaquin Phoenix	Nominated	
Cinema Audio Society Awards	January 25, 2020	Outstanding Achievement in Sound Mixing for a Motion Picture – Live Action	Tod Maitland, Dean Zupancic, Tom Ozanich, Daniel Kresco, Thomas J. O’Connell and Richard Duarte	Nominated	
Clio Awards	November 21, 2019	Theatrical: Teaser	Joker (for "Maybe Tomorrow")	Won	
Critics' Choice Movie Awards	January 12, 2020	Best Picture	Joker	Nominated	
Critics' Choice Movie Awards	January 12, 2020	Best Actor	Joaquin Phoenix	Won	
Critics' Choice Movie Awards	January 12, 2020	Best Adapted Screenplay	Todd Phillips and Scott Silver	Nominated	
Critics' Choice Movie Awards	January 12, 2020	Best Cinematography	Lawrence Sher	Nominated	
Critics' Choice Movie Awards	January 12, 2020	Best Production Design	Mark Friedberg and Kris Moran	Nominated	
Critics' Choice Movie Awards	January 12, 2020	Best Hair and Makeup	Joker	Nominated	
Critics' Choice Movie Awards	January 12, 2020	Best Score	Hildur Guðnadóttir	Won	
Dallas–Fort Worth Film Critics Association Awards	December 16, 2019	Best Actor	Joaquin Phoenix	Runner-up	
David di Donatello Awards	May 8, 2020	Best Foreign Film	Joker	Nominated	
Detroit Film Critics Society Awards	December 9, 2019	Best Actor	Joaquin Phoenix	Nominated	
Dorian Awards	January 8, 2020	Film Performance of the Year – Actor	Joaquin Phoenix	Nominated	
Dragon Awards	September 7, 2020	Best Science Fiction or Fantasy Movie	Joker	Nominated	
Dublin Film Critics' Circle Awards	December 17, 2019	Best Film	Joker	4th Place	
Dublin Film Critics' Circle Awards	December 17, 2019	Best Director	Todd Phillips	5th Place	
Dublin Film Critics' Circle Awards	December 17, 2019	Best Actor	Joaquin Phoenix	Runner-up	
Dublin Film Critics' Circle Awards	December 17, 2019	Best Cinematography	Lawrence Sher	3rd Place	
Florida Film Critics Circle Awards	December 23, 2019	Best Actor	Joaquin Phoenix	Nominated	
Florida Film Critics Circle Awards	December 23, 2019	Best Score	Hildur Guðnadóttir	Nominated	
Georgia Film Critics Association Awards	January 10, 2020	Best Actor	Joaquin Phoenix	Nominated	
Georgia Film Critics Association Awards	January 10, 2020	Best Adapted Screenplay	Todd Phillips and Scott Silver	Nominated	
Georgia Film Critics Association Awards	January 10, 2020	Best Original Score	Hildur Guðnadóttir	Nominated	
Globes de Cristal Awards	No Date (Note: The ceremony was supposed to be held on March 14, 2020, but was indefinitely cancelled due to the COVID-19 pandemic.)	Best Foreign Film	Joker	Nominated	
Golden Globe Awards	January 5, 2020	Best Motion Picture – Drama	Joker	Nominated	
Golden Globe Awards	January 5, 2020	Best Actor in a Motion Picture – Drama	Joaquin Phoenix	Won	
Golden Globe Awards	January 5, 2020	Best Director	Todd Phillips	Nominated	
Golden Globe Awards	January 5, 2020	Best Original Score	Hildur Guðnadóttir	Won	
Golden Raspberry Awards	March 16, 2020	Worst Reckless Disregard for Human Life and Public Property	Joker	Nominated	
Golden Reel Awards	January 19, 2020	Outstanding Achievement in Sound Editing – Dialogue and ADR for Feature Film	Alan Robert Murray, Kira Roessler and Cameron Steenhagen	Nominated	
Golden Reel Awards	January 19, 2020	Outstanding Achievement in Sound Editing – Effects and Foley for Feature Film	Alan Robert Murray, Tom Ozanich, Darren Maynard, John Joseph Thomas, Christian Wenger, Michael Dressel, Willard Overstreet, Kevin R.W. Murray, John T. Cucci, Dan O'Connell	Nominated	
Golden Reel Awards	January 19, 2020	Outstanding Achievement in Sound Editing – Music Underscore	Lena Glikson and Daniel Waldman	Nominated	
Golden Trailer Awards	May 29, 2019	Best Teaser	Warner Bros. and JAX (for "Maybe Tomorrow")	Nominated	
Golden Trailer Awards	July 22, 2021	Best Action/Thriller Trailerbyte for a Feature Film	Warner Bros. and Pool Party Creative (for "Power Run")	Nominated	
Golden Trailer Awards	July 22, 2021	Best Graphics in a TV Spot (for a Feature Film)	Warner Bros. and Mark Woollen & Associates (for "Mirror")	Nominated	
Golden Trailer Awards	July 22, 2021	Most Original TV Spot (for a Feature Film)	Warner Bros. and Mark Woollen & Associates (for "Mirror")	Nominated	
Golden Trailer Awards	July 22, 2021	Best Thriller	Warner Bros. and JAX (for "Open Mic")	Won	
Grammy Awards	March 14, 2021	Best Score Soundtrack For Visual Media	Hildur Guðnadóttir	Won	
Grammy Awards	March 14, 2021	Best Arrangement, Instrumental or A Cappella	Hildur Guðnadóttir (for "Bathroom Dance")	Nominated	
Grande Prêmio do Cinema Brasileiro	October 11, 2020	Best Foreign Film	Joker	Nominated	
Guild of Music Supervisors Awards	February 6, 2020	Best Music Supervision for Trailers	Anny Colvin	Won	
Guinness World Records	2019	First R-rated film to earn $1 billion at the worldwide box office	Joker	Won	
Guinness World Records	2019	Highest-grossing R-rated film	Joker	Won	
Harvey Awards	October 11, 2020	Best Adaptation from Comic Book/Graphic Novel	Joker	Nominated	
Hochi Film Awards	December 2, 2020	Best Foreign Film	Joker	Nominated	
Hollywood Critics Association Awards	January 9, 2020	Best Picture	Joker	Nominated	
Hollywood Critics Association Awards	January 9, 2020	Best Actor	Joaquin Phoenix	Won	
Hollywood Critics Association Awards	January 9, 2020	Best Adapted Screenplay	Scott Silver and Todd Phillips	Nominated	
Hollywood Critics Association Awards	January 9, 2020	Best Cinematography	Lawrence Sher	Nominated	
Hollywood Critics Association Awards	January 9, 2020	Best Costume Design	Mark Bridges	Nominated	
Hollywood Critics Association Awards	January 9, 2020	Best Hair and Makeup	Nicki Ledermann and Kay Georgiou	Nominated	
Hollywood Critics Association Awards	January 9, 2020	Best Original Score	Hildur Guðnadóttir	Won	
Hollywood Music in Media Awards	November 20, 2019	Best Score in a Feature Film	Hildur Guðnadóttir (Note: Tied with Marco Beltrami and Buck Sanders for Ford v Ferrari)	Won	
Hollywood Professional Association Awards	November 19, 2020	Outstanding Color Grading – Theatrical Feature	Jill Bogdanowicz (Company 3)	Won	
Hollywood Professional Association Awards	November 19, 2020	Outstanding Editing – Theatrical Feature	Jeff Groth	Nominated	
Hollywood Professional Association Awards	November 19, 2020	Outstanding Sound – Theatrical Feature	Alan Robert Murray, Dean Zupancic, Tom Ozanich, Jason Ruder and Tod Maitland	Nominated	
Houston Film Critics Society Awards	January 2, 2020	Best Picture	Joker	Nominated	
Houston Film Critics Society Awards	January 2, 2020	Best Actor	Joaquin Phoenix	Nominated	
Houston Film Critics Society Awards	January 2, 2020	Best Cinematography	Lawrence Sher	Nominated	
Houston Film Critics Society Awards	January 2, 2020	Best Original Score	Hildur Guðnadóttir	Nominated	
Huading Awards	October 29, 2020	Best Global Motion Picture	Joker	Nominated	
Huading Awards	October 29, 2020	Best Global Director for a Motion Picture	Todd Phillips	Nominated	
Huading Awards	October 29, 2020	Best Global Actor in a Motion Picture	Joaquin Phoenix	Won	
ICG Publicists Awards	February 7, 2020	Maxwell Weinberg Publicist Showmanship Award	Joker	Won	
IndieWire Critics Poll	December 16, 2019	Best Film	Joker	9th Place	
IndieWire Critics Poll	December 16, 2019	Best Director	Todd Phillips	10th Place	
IndieWire Critics Poll	December 16, 2019	Best Actor	Joaquin Phoenix	4th Place	
IndieWire Critics Poll	December 16, 2019	Best Screenplay	Todd Phillips and Scott Silver	20th Place	
IndieWire Critics Poll	December 16, 2019	Best Supporting Actor	Robert De Niro	23rd Place	
IndieWire Critics Poll	December 16, 2019	Best Cinematography	Lawrence Sher	13th Place	
International Cinephile Society Awards	February 4, 2020	Best Actor	Joaquin Phoenix	Nominated	
International Cinephile Society Awards	February 4, 2020	Best Original Score	Hildur Guðnadóttir	Nominated	
International Film Music Critics Association Awards	February 20, 2020	Film Score of the Year	Hildur Guðnadóttir	Nominated	
International Film Music Critics Association Awards	February 20, 2020	Film Composer of the Year	Hildur Guðnadóttir	Nominated	
International Film Music Critics Association Awards	February 20, 2020	Best Original Score for a Drama Film	Hildur Guðnadóttir	Nominated	
International Film Music Critics Association Awards	February 20, 2020	Film Music Composition of the Year	Hildur Guðnadóttir (for "Call Me Joker")	Nominated	
Japan Academy Film Prize	March 6, 2020	Outstanding Foreign Language Film	Joker	Won	
Jupiter Awards	March 19, 2020	Best International Film	Joker	Nominated	
Jupiter Awards	March 19, 2020	Best International Actor	Joaquin Phoenix	Nominated	
Kinema Junpo Awards	February 19, 2020	Best Foreign Film	Joker	Won	
Kinema Junpo Awards	February 19, 2020	Best Foreign Film Director	Todd Phillips	Won	
Kinema Junpo Awards	February 19, 2020	Readers' Choice Best Foreign Film	Joker	Won	
Kinema Junpo Awards	February 19, 2020	Readers' Choice Best Foreign Film Director	Todd Phillips	Won	
London Film Critics' Circle Awards	January 30, 2020	Film of the Year	Joker	Nominated	
London Film Critics' Circle Awards	January 30, 2020	Actor of the Year	Joaquin Phoenix	Won	
Mainichi Film Awards	February 13, 2020	Foreign Film Best One Award	Joker	Won	
Mainichi Film Awards	February 13, 2020	TSUTAYA Premium Film Fan Award	Joker	Won	
Make-Up Artists and Hair Stylists Guild Awards	February 16, 2020	Best Period and/or Character Make-Up	Nicki Ledermann, Tania Ribalow and Sunday Englis	Won	
Make-Up Artists and Hair Stylists Guild Awards	February 16, 2020	Best Contemporary Hair Styling	Kay Georgiou and Vanessa Anderson	Nominated	
New York Film Critics Online Awards	December 7, 2019	Top 10 Films of the Year	Joker	Won	
New York Film Critics Online Awards	December 7, 2019	Best Actor	Joaquin Phoenix	Won	
Nikkan Sports Film Awards	December 12, 2019	Best Foreign Film	Joker	Nominated	
NME Awards	February 12, 2020	Best Film	Joker	Nominated	
NME Awards	February 12, 2020	Best Film Actor	Joaquin Phoenix	Nominated	
Online Film Critics Society Awards	January 6, 2020	Best Actor	Joaquin Phoenix	Nominated	
Online Film Critics Society Awards	January 6, 2020	Best Original Score	Hildur Guðnadóttir	Nominated	
Palm Springs International Film Festival Awards	January 3, 2020	Chairman's Award	Joaquin Phoenix	Won	
Palm Springs International Film Festival Awards	January 3, 2020	Creative Impact in Directing Award	Todd Phillips	Won	
Producers Guild of America Awards	January 18, 2020	Best Theatrical Motion Picture	Joker	Nominated	
Robert Awards	January 26, 2020	Best English Language Film	Joker	Won	
Rondo Hatton Classic Horror Awards	April 6, 2020	Best Film	Joker	Won	
San Diego Film Critics Society Awards	December 9, 2019	Best Film	Joker	Nominated	
San Diego Film Critics Society Awards	December 9, 2019	Best Actor	Joaquin Phoenix (Note: Tied with Adam Driver for Marriage Story)	Won	
San Diego Film Critics Society Awards	December 9, 2019	Best Adapted Screenplay	Todd Phillips and Scott Silver	Nominated	
San Diego Film Critics Society Awards	December 9, 2019	Best Use of Music	Hildur Guðnadóttir	Nominated	
San Francisco Bay Area Film Critics Circle Awards	December 16, 2019	Best Actor	Joaquin Phoenix	Nominated	
San Francisco Bay Area Film Critics Circle Awards	December 16, 2019	Best Original Score	Hildur Guðnadóttir	Nominated	
Sant Jordi Awards	July 22, 2020	Best Actor in a Foreign Film	Joaquin Phoenix (Note: Also for The Sisters Brothers)	Nominated	
Satellite Awards	December 19, 2019	Best Motion Picture, Drama	Joker	Nominated	
Satellite Awards	December 19, 2019	Best Actor in a Motion Picture, Drama	Joaquin Phoenix	Nominated	
Satellite Awards	December 19, 2019	Best Adapted Screenplay	Todd Phillips and Scott Silver	Won	
Satellite Awards	December 19, 2019	Best Original Score	Hildur Guðnadóttir	Won	
Satellite Awards	December 19, 2019	Best Cinematography	Lawrence Sher	Nominated	
Satellite Awards	December 19, 2019	Best Visual Effects	Edwin Rivera, Mathew Giampa and Bryan Godwin	Nominated	
Satellite Awards	December 19, 2019	Best Editing	Jeff Groth	Nominated	
Satellite Awards	December 19, 2019	Best Sound	Alan Robert Murray, Tom Ozanich and Dean Zupancic	Nominated	
Satellite Awards	December 19, 2019	Best Art Direction and Production Design	Mark Friedberg and Laura Ballinger	Nominated	
Satellite Awards	December 19, 2019	Best Costume Design	Mark Bridges	Nominated	
Saturn Awards	October 26, 2021	Best Comic-to-Film Motion Picture Release	Joker	Won	
Saturn Awards	October 26, 2021	Best Actor	Joaquin Phoenix	Nominated	
Saturn Awards	October 26, 2021	Best Supporting Actress	Zazie Beetz	Nominated	
Saturn Awards	October 26, 2021	Best Writing	Todd Phillips and Scott Silver	Nominated	
Saturn Awards	October 26, 2021	Best Production Design	Mark Friedberg	Nominated	
Screen Actors Guild Awards	January 19, 2020	Outstanding Performance by a Male Actor in a Leading Role	Joaquin Phoenix	Won	
Screen Actors Guild Awards	January 19, 2020	Outstanding Performance by a Stunt Ensemble in a Motion Picture	Joker	Nominated	
Seattle Film Critics Society Awards	December 16, 2019	Best Actor in a Leading Role	Joaquin Phoenix	Nominated	
Seattle Film Critics Society Awards	December 16, 2019	Best Original Score	Hildur Guðnadóttir	Nominated	
Seattle Film Critics Society Awards	December 16, 2019	Villain of the Year	Arthur Fleck/The Joker (portrayed by Joaquin Phoenix)	Nominated	
SOC Awards	January 18, 2020	Camera Operator of the Year – Film	Geoffrey Haley	Won	
Society of Composers & Lyricists Awards	January 7, 2020	Outstanding Original Score for a Studio Film	Hildur Guðnadóttir	Won	
St. Louis Film Critics Association Awards	December 15, 2019	Best Actor	Joaquin Phoenix	Runner-up	
St. Louis Film Critics Association Awards	December 15, 2019	Best Adapted Screenplay	Todd Phillips and Scott Silver	Nominated	
St. Louis Film Critics Association Awards	December 15, 2019	Best Cinematography	Lawrence Sher	Nominated	
Taurus World Stunt Awards	November 21, 2020	Hardest Hit	Stephen Izzi	Won	
TEC Awards	January 22, 2021	Outstanding Creative Achievement Film Sound Production	Joker	Nominated	
TIFF Tribute Awards	September 9, 2019	Actor Award	Joaquin Phoenix	Won	
Turkish Film Critics Association Awards	August 23, 2020	Best Foreign Film	Joker	5th Place	
Vancouver Film Critics Circle Awards	December 16, 2019	Best Actor	Joaquin Phoenix	Nominated	
Venice International Film Festival Awards	September 7, 2019	Golden Lion	Joker	Won	
Venice International Film Festival Awards	September 7, 2019	Graffetta d'Oro	Joker	Won	
Venice International Film Festival Awards	September 7, 2019	Premio Soundtrack Stars Award	Hildur Guðnadóttir	Won	
Visual Effects Society Awards	January 29, 2020	Outstanding Supporting Visual Effects in a Photoreal Feature	Edwin Rivera, Brice Parker, Mathew Giampa, Bryan Godwin and Jeff Brink	Nominated	
Washington D.C. Area Film Critics Association Awards	December 8, 2019	Best Actor	Joaquin Phoenix	Nominated	
Washington D.C. Area Film Critics Association Awards	December 8, 2019	Best Adapted Screenplay	Todd Phillips and Scott Silver	Nominated	
Washington D.C. Area Film Critics Association Awards	December 8, 2019	Best Score	Hildur Guðnadóttir	Nominated	
Women Film Critics Circle Awards	December 9, 2019	Best Actor	Joaquin Phoenix	Runner-up	
Women Film Critics Circle Awards	December 9, 2019	Mommie Dearest Worst Screen Mom of the Year Award	Frances Conroy	Won	
World Soundtrack Awards	October 24, 2020	Film Composer of the Year	Hildur Guðnadóttir	Won	
Writers Guild of America Awards	February 1, 2020	Best Adapted Screenplay	Todd Phillips and Scott Silver	Nominated	
