= Maestro (2023 film) =

Film by Bradley Cooper

- Release poster
- Directed by: Bradley Cooper
- Written by: Bradley Cooper; Josh Singer
- Produced by: Martin Scorsese; Bradley Cooper; Steven Spielberg; Fred Berner; Amy Durning; Kristie Macosko Krieger
- Starring: Carey Mulligan; Bradley Cooper
- Cinematography: Matthew Libatique
- Edited by: Michelle Tesoro
- Music by: Leonard Bernstein
- Production companies: Lea Pictures; Sikelia Productions; Amblin Entertainment; Fred Berner Films
- Distributed by: Netflix
- Release dates: September 2, 2023 (Venice); November 22, 2023 (United States)
- Running time: 129 minutes
- Country: United States
- Language: English
- Budget: $80 million
- Box office: $523,000

Maestro is a 2023 American biographical romantic drama film that centers on the relationship between American composer Leonard Bernstein and his wife Felicia Montealegre. It was directed by Bradley Cooper, from a screenplay he wrote with Josh Singer. It was produced by Cooper, Martin Scorsese, Steven Spielberg, Kristie Macosko Krieger, Fred Berner, and Amy Durning. The film stars Carey Mulligan as Montealegre alongside Cooper as Bernstein. Matt Bomer, Maya Hawke, and Sarah Silverman appear in supporting roles.

Plans for a Leonard Bernstein biopic began in 2008, but languished in development hell for nearly a decade at Paramount Pictures. At various points both Martin Scorsese and Steven Spielberg were attached to direct, but both eventually dropped out but remained on the project as producers. Cooper, who had already signed on to star in 2017, was then named as director following an early screening of his directorial debut A Star Is Born (2018), and he rewrote Singer's original script. The rest of the cast joined between 2020 and 2023, and filming took place between May and October 2022, in Los Angeles, Massachusetts, Bernstein's home in Connecticut, and England.

Maestro premiered at the 80th Venice International Film Festival on September 2, 2023, where it was nominated for the Golden Lion. The film received a limited theatrical release on November 22, 2023, before being released on Netflix on December 20. It received generally positive reviews from critics, with praise given to the direction and the performances, especially those of Cooper and Mulligan, but criticism of the writing and presentation. The film was named one of the top 10 of 2023 by the National Board of Review and the American Film Institute. It received seven Academy Award nominations, including Best Picture, Best Actor (Cooper), and Best Actress (Mulligan), as well as nominations for seven BAFTA Awards, four Golden Globe Awards, and two Screen Actors Guild Awards.

== Plot ==
In 1987, a nearly 70-year-old Leonard Bernstein plays a sequence on a piano from his opera A Quiet Place while being interviewed in his home. After he finishes, he shares brief details regarding the significant impact left on him by Felicia, his wife of many years, and mentions seeing her ghost.

In 1943, Leonard—then the 25-year-old assistant conductor of the New York Philharmonic—makes his conducting debut at short notice when guest conductor Bruno Walter falls ill. His exceptional performance receives a rapturous reception from the audience and catapults him to fame. Despite being in an intermittent relationship with clarinetist David Oppenheim, he falls for aspiring actress Felicia Montealegre at a party and the two begin dating. He breaks up with David, who is heartbroken but reluctantly accepts Leonard's choice. Leonard and Felicia ultimately marry and have three children: Jamie, Alexander, and Nina. Throughout their marriage, they are seen supporting each other in their careers.

By the mid-1950s, the Bernsteins live a highly affluent life in the public eye, with Leonard having composed several successful operas and Broadway musicals, including Candide and West Side Story. Felicia combats concerns raised about Leonard's affairs with men, insistent that she holds rein over him as his wife. As the years pass, however, Leonard's dalliances—as well as his alcohol and substance abuse—take a deep toll on their marriage. These issues are compounded when Jamie hears whispers of her father's infidelity. Leonard attempts to deny the rumors as fueled by "jealousies".

One Thanksgiving, after Leonard returns home to their apartment in The Dakota late from a bender, he and Felicia have an explosive argument where she insists that he has hate in his heart, and will "die a lonely old queen" if he continues on his current path. Despite the breakdown of their relationship, the couple remains married through Leonard's composition of Mass in 1971. In 1973, Leonard conducts Mahler's Resurrection Symphony with the London Symphony Orchestra in a legendary performance at Ely Cathedral, England. Amidst the uproarious reception, Felicia reconciles with Leonard, insistent that "there's no hate in [his] heart".

Felicia is diagnosed with breast cancer which has metastasized to the lung; despite surgeries and an aggressive chemotherapy regimen, her condition deteriorates, and she dies in Leonard's arms in 1978 at the age of 56. Overcome with grief, Leonard and the children abandon their lavish home shortly afterward. Leonard is shown once again in 1987, teaching the art of conducting and still partying, as well as having affairs with his much younger male students. Returning to the interview, Leonard admits that he misses Felicia terribly, before his mind flashes back to an image of her, back in their youth, walking into their yard.

== Cast ==
- Bradley Cooper as Leonard Bernstein
- Carey Mulligan as Felicia Montealegre
- Matt Bomer as David Oppenheim
- Sarah Silverman as Shirley Bernstein
- Maya Hawke as Jamie Bernstein
- Josh Hamilton as John Gruen
- Sam Nivola as Alexander Bernstein
- Alexa Swinton as Nina Bernstein
- Vincenzo Amato as Bruno Zirato
- Greg Hildreth as Isaac
- Michael Urie as Jerry Robbins
- Brian Klugman as Aaron Copland
- Nick Blaemire as Adolph Green
- Mallory Portnoy as Betty Comden
- Yasen Peyankov as Serge Koussevitzky
- Zachary Booth as Mendy Wager
- Miriam Shor as Cynthia O'Neal
- Scott Ellis as Harry Kraut
- Gideon Glick as Tommy Cothran
- June Gable as Old Lady
- Kate Eastman as Ellen Adler

== Production ==
=== Development ===
In 2008, producers Fred Berner and Amy Durning approached the Bernstein family to negotiate Leonard Bernstein's life and music rights. Once retaining rights, Berner and Durning approached Josh Singer to develop and write a screenplay and attached Martin Scorsese as a director. The project went into development at Paramount Pictures.

In 2017, Scorsese stepped down as director to work on The Irishman. Briefly, Steven Spielberg considered directing the film and approached Bradley Cooper to star. When Spielberg decided not to direct the film, Cooper said he wanted to "throw his hat in the ring" as a possible director. In May 2018 Cooper was firmly attached as both director and to star as Bernstein, after Spielberg saw a pre-release screening of A Star Is Born. Berner, Durning, and Scorsese continued on as producers alongside Spielberg and Kristie Macosko Krieger of Amblin Entertainment. In January 2020, the project was moved to Netflix.

=== Casting ===
In September 2020, the project was given the title Maestro with Carey Mulligan joining the cast. It was also announced that filming would begin in the spring of 2021. In October, Jeremy Strong joined the cast as John Gruen, but later dropped out due to scheduling conflicts; Josh Hamilton was cast in his place. In March 2022, Matt Bomer joined the cast. Bomer would be confirmed in April, with Maya Hawke also announced as being cast. In June, Sarah Silverman was announced as playing Bernstein's sister Shirley. In February 2023, Michael Urie was announced to be appearing in the film as Jerome Robbins. In April 2023, it was reported that Miriam Shor was a part of the cast.

=== Filming ===
Filming was initially expected to begin on April 5, 2021, in Los Angeles; but instead began in May 2022. Production occurred at Tanglewood between May 21 and 26, Fairfield, Connecticut at Bernstein's home, and in New York City. Filming also took place at Ely Cathedral in England between October 20 and 22.

== Soundtrack ==
Maestro features Bernstein compositions that were handpicked by Cooper. Those pieces were performed by the London Symphony Orchestra with a few choral performances by the London Symphony Chorus, conducted by Yannick Nézet-Séguin who also served as Cooper's conducting coach. The soundtrack was preceded with an excerpt from the finale of Mahler's Symphony No. 2 "Resurrection" as a single on October 20. The full soundtrack was released by Deutsche Grammophon digitally on November 10 and was released physically on December 1. The music played by Bernstein at the piano during the prologue comes from his 1983 opera A Quiet Place which depicts a dysfunctional family, including an estranged gay son whose mother has just died.

== Release ==
Maestro premiered at the 80th Venice International Film Festival on September 2, 2023, where it was nominated for the Golden Lion. It received a gala screening as part of the New York Film Festival's spotlight program on October 2, 2023, making it the first film to hold a premiere at the new David Geffen Hall. Cooper attended the event but did not participate in the post-film Q&A due to restrictions imposed during the 2023 SAG-AFTRA strike. Additionally, Maestro screened at the BFI London Film Festival and closed the AFI Fest. The film began a limited theatrical release in the United States on November 22, 2023, with engagements in Dolby Cinema, before streaming on Netflix on December 20, 2023.

== Reception ==
=== Box office ===
Although Netflix does not publicly report box office grosses, IndieWire estimated the film made about $200,000 from eight theaters in its opening weekend (and a total of $300,000 over the five-day Thanksgiving frame).

=== Critical response ===
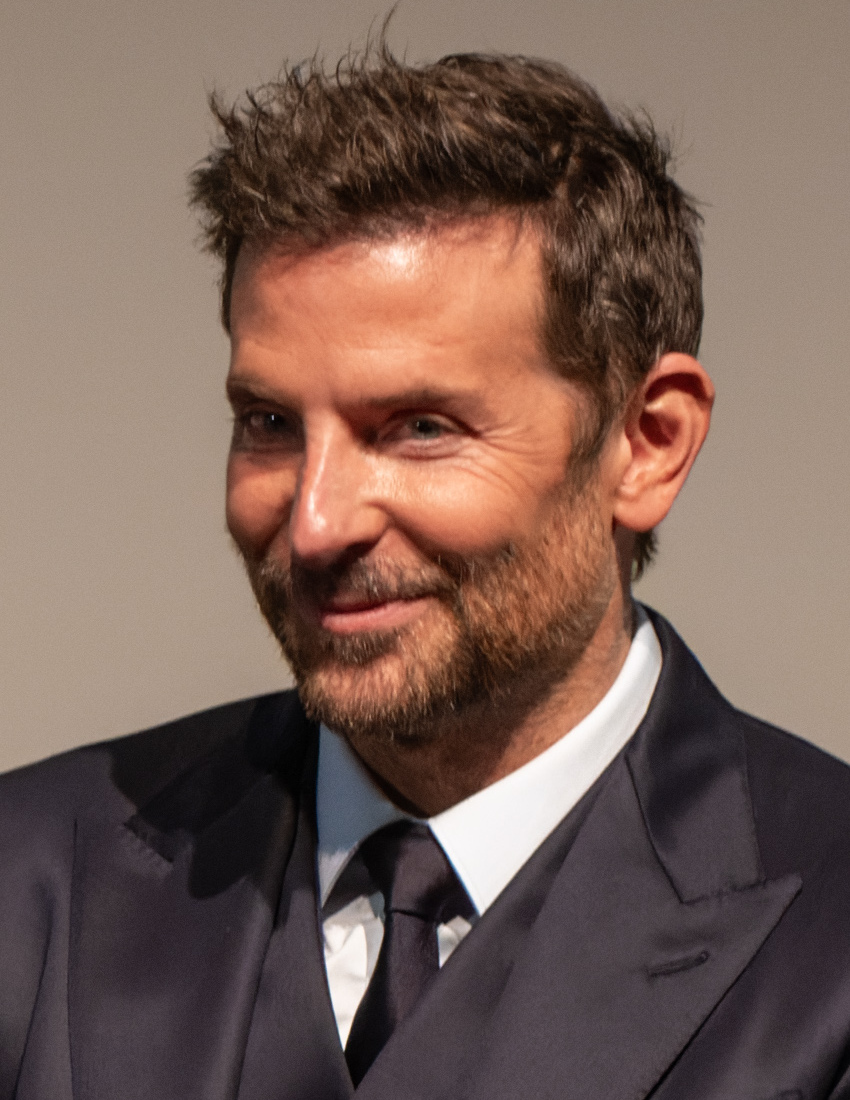
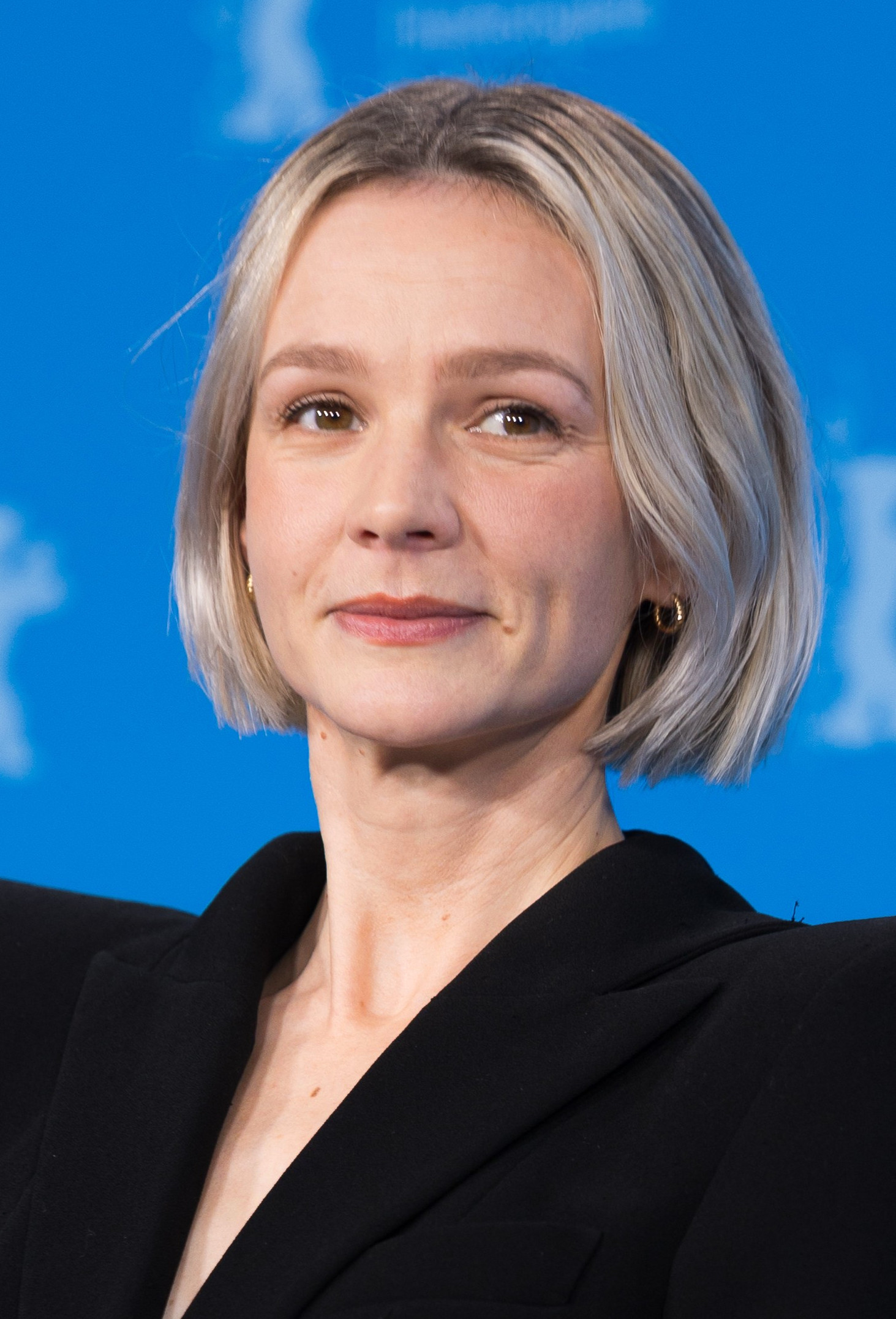
Bradley Cooper and Carey Mulligan garnered critical acclaim for their performances and earned Academy Award nominations for Best Actor and Best Actress.

On the review aggregator website Rotten Tomatoes, 78% of 335 critics' reviews are positive, with an average rating of 7.4/10. The website's consensus reads: "Led by a pair of powerful performances, Maestro serves as a stirring overview of a tremendous talent's life and legacy." Metacritic, which uses a weighted average, assigned the film a score of 77 out of 100, based on 62 critics, indicating "generally favorable" reviews.

The performances and Cooper's direction received praise, with BBC Culture's Nicholas Barber complimenting Cooper's "technical virtuosity" and ability to "fulfill [his] ambitions with flair", and David Rooney of The Hollywood Reporter lauding the film's depiction of marriage and describing Mulligan's role as "heartbreaking". Adam Graham of Detroit News wrote, "Maestro comes alive as Cooper filters Bernstein's passion for life and all its grand indulgences into an intensely physical performance, which peaks in a sweat-drenched conducting sequence that bursts off the screen."

Conversely, Richard Brody of The New Yorker criticized the film for disregarding parts of Bernstein's life, writing that "The movie's general lack of candor matches its scrupulous avoidance of controversy and complexity, which does no justice to the complex and controversial characters at the center of the film."

In a review for El País, Carlos Boyero wrote: "Cooper whimsically uses color and black and white to portray his life, and exotic planning to recount Bernstein’s present and past. And in the way he describes him, I fail to figure out where his appeal and genius lies. I’m getting confused. I just don’t like him, I don’t care about him, I’m not bothered about his achievements and his failures." while la La Repubblica called the film "a non-conventional biopic, part musical, part melodrama".

Filmmakers A. V. Rockwell, Chloe Domont, Chad Hartigan, Don Hertzfeldt, Laurel Parmet and Paul Schrader all cited it as among their favorite films of 2023.

=== Use of prosthetic ===
Cooper's use of a large prosthetic nose to portray Bernstein, who was Jewish, was criticized by some as an example of "Jewface", following the release of photographs from the set of the film in May 2023 and the subsequent release of the trailer in August. The chief television critic of The Hollywood Reporter, Daniel Fienberg, criticized the casting of the non-Jewish actors Cooper and Mulligan in a Twitter post as "a LOT of ethnic cosplay for one movie". English Jewish actress Tracy-Ann Oberman wrote that if Cooper "can't [play the role] through the power of acting alone then don't cast him – get a Jewish actor". She felt that as Cooper had portrayed Joseph Merrick, a 19th-century British man who had severe facial deformities, without prosthetics, "then he should be able to manage to play a Jewish man without one".

Bernstein's children defended Cooper's use of prosthetic makeup to portray him, stating that they worked with Cooper throughout the filmmaking process and that their "dad would have been fine with it". The Anti-Defamation League noted historical media portrayal of Jews as "evil caricatures with large, hooked noses" but said that "this film, which is a biopic, ... is not that". In September 2023, Kazu Hiro, who created the prosthetic, said that he was surprised by the criticism but was "sorry if [he] hurt some people's feelings". He added that "our only intention" was to portray Bernstein "as authentically as possible".

The New Yorker published an essay defending the special effects make-up used by Hiro in the film and numbered him as among the top three or four special effects make-up artists of the past fifty years stating the film's background intentions as: "In the beginning, Hiro worked on a prosthetic treatment that was, in Cooper's words, 'totally Lenny'. But Cooper felt that it didn't look real. 'We wanted to find a medium between Lenny and me', he explained, 'so we created this hybrid.' The most difficult years for Hiro to re-create were Bernstein's final ones. Even late in life, Bernstein was flirtatious. Cooper felt that the seventy-something Bernstein still needed to look a bit 'sexy'."

=== Accolades ===
Bradley Cooper, who became the fifteenth person to direct himself to a Best Actor nomination for A Star Is Born (2018), has now become the fifth person to have done so more than once.

| Award | Date of ceremony | Category | Recipient(s) | Result | Ref. |
|---|---|---|---|---|---|
| Academy Awards | March 10, 2024 | Best Picture | Bradley Cooper, Steven Spielberg, Fred Berner, Amy Durning and Kristie Macosko Krieger | Nominated | |
| Academy Awards | March 10, 2024 | Best Actor | Bradley Cooper | Nominated | |
| Academy Awards | March 10, 2024 | Best Actress | Carey Mulligan | Nominated | |
| Academy Awards | March 10, 2024 | Best Original Screenplay | Bradley Cooper and Josh Singer | Nominated | |
| Academy Awards | March 10, 2024 | Best Cinematography | Matthew Libatique | Nominated | |
| Academy Awards | March 10, 2024 | Best Makeup and Hairstyling | Kazu Hiro, Kay Georgiou and Lori McCoy-Bell | Nominated | |
| Academy Awards | March 10, 2024 | Best Sound | Steven A. Morrow, Richard King, Jason Ruder, Tom Ozanich and Dean Zupancic | Nominated | |
| American Film Institute | January 12, 2024 | Top Ten Films of the Year | Maestro | Won | |
| AACTA International Awards | February 8, 2024 | Best Direction | Bradley Cooper | Nominated | |
| AACTA International Awards | February 8, 2024 | Best Actor | Bradley Cooper | Nominated | |
| AACTA International Awards | February 8, 2024 | Best Actress | Carey Mulligan | Nominated | |
| AACTA International Awards | February 8, 2024 | Best Screenplay | Bradley Cooper and Josh Singer | Nominated | |
| AARP Movies for Grownups Awards | January 17, 2024 | Best Movie for Grownups | Maestro | Nominated | |
| AARP Movies for Grownups Awards | January 17, 2024 | Best Time Capsule | Maestro | Won | |
| Alliance of Women Film Journalists | January 3, 2024 | Best Actor | Bradley Cooper | Nominated | |
| Alliance of Women Film Journalists | January 3, 2024 | Best Cinematography | Matthew Libatique | Nominated | |
| Alliance of Women Film Journalists | January 3, 2024 | Best Editing | Michelle Tesoro | Nominated | |
| American Society of Cinematographers | March 3, 2024 | Outstanding Achievement in Cinematography in Theatrical Releases | Matthew Libatique | Nominated | |
| American Cinema Editors | March 3, 2024 | Best Edited Feature Film (Drama, Theatrical) | Michelle Tesoro | Nominated | |
| Art Directors Guild of America Awards | February 10, 2024 | Excellence for a Period Film | Kevin Thompson | Nominated | |
| Artios Awards | March 7, 2024 | Outstanding Achievement in Casting – Big Budget Feature (Drama) | Shayna Markowitz, Dayna Katz | Nominated | |
| Astra Awards | January 6, 2024 | Best Picture | Maestro | Nominated | |
| Astra Awards | January 6, 2024 | Best Director | Bradley Cooper | Nominated | |
| Astra Awards | January 6, 2024 | Best Actor | Bradley Cooper | Nominated | |
| Astra Awards | January 6, 2024 | Best Actress | Carey Mulligan | Nominated | |
| Astra Awards | February 26, 2024 | Best Cinematography | Matthew Libatique | Nominated | |
| Astra Awards | February 26, 2024 | Best Hair and Makeup | Kazu Hiro | Won | |
| Astra Awards | February 26, 2024 | Best Sound | Maestro | Nominated | |
| Austin Film Critics Association | January 10, 2024 | Best Cinematography | Matthew Libatique | Nominated | |
| Austin Film Critics Association | January 10, 2024 | Best Editing | Michelle Tesoro | Nominated | |
| Black Film Critics Circle | December 20, 2023 | Top Ten Films | Maestro | 9th Place | |
| British Academy Film Awards | February 12, 2024 | Best Director | Bradley Cooper | Nominated | |
| British Academy Film Awards | February 12, 2024 | Best Actor | Bradley Cooper | Nominated | |
| British Academy Film Awards | February 12, 2024 | Best Actress | Carey Mulligan | Nominated | |
| British Academy Film Awards | February 12, 2024 | Best Original Screenplay | Bradley Cooper and Josh Singer | Nominated | |
| British Academy Film Awards | February 12, 2024 | Best Cinematography | Matthew Libatique | Nominated | |
| British Academy Film Awards | February 12, 2024 | Best Makeup & Hair | Kazu Hiro | Nominated | |
| British Academy Film Awards | February 12, 2024 | Best Sound | Maestro | Nominated | |
| British Society of Cinematographers | February 3, 2024 | Best Cinematography in a Theatrical Feature Film | Matthew Libatique | Nominated | |
| Camerimage | November 18, 2023 | Golden Frog | Matthew Libatique | Nominated | |
| Capri Hollywood International Film Festival | January 2, 2024 | Visionary Award | Bradley Cooper | Won | |
| Capri Hollywood International Film Festival | January 2, 2024 | Best Actress | Carey Mulligan | Won | |
| Capri Hollywood International Film Festival | January 2, 2024 | Best Makeup and Hairstyling | Kazu Hiro | Won | |
| Capri Hollywood International Film Festival | January 2, 2024 | Best Sound | Maestro | Won | |
| Capri Hollywood International Film Festival | January 2, 2024 | Producers of the Year | Fred Berner, Bradley Cooper, Martin Scorsese, Steven Spielberg, Amy Durning, Kristie Macosko Krieger | Won | |
| Cinema Audio Society Awards | March 2, 2024 | Outstanding Achievement in Sound Mixing for Motion Picture – Live Action | Steven A. Morrow, Tom Ozanich, Dean A. Zupancic, Nick Baxter, Bobby Johanson, Walter Spencer | Nominated | |
| Critics' Choice Movie Awards | January 14, 2024 | Best Picture | Maestro | Nominated | |
| Critics' Choice Movie Awards | January 14, 2024 | Best Director | Bradley Cooper | Nominated | |
| Critics' Choice Movie Awards | January 14, 2024 | Best Actor | Bradley Cooper | Nominated | |
| Critics' Choice Movie Awards | January 14, 2024 | Best Actress | Carey Mulligan | Nominated | |
| Critics' Choice Movie Awards | January 14, 2024 | Best Original Screenplay | Bradley Cooper and Josh Singer | Nominated | |
| Critics' Choice Movie Awards | January 14, 2024 | Best Cinematography | Matthew Libatique | Nominated | |
| Critics' Choice Movie Awards | January 14, 2024 | Best Makeup | Kazu Hiro | Nominated | |
| Critics' Choice Movie Awards | January 14, 2024 | Best Film Editing | Michelle Tesoro | Nominated | |
| Costume Designers Guild Awards | February 21, 2024 | Excellence in Period Film | Mark Bridges | Nominated | |
| Dallas–Fort Worth Film Critics Association | December 18, 2023 | Best Film | Maestro | 7th place | |
| Dallas–Fort Worth Film Critics Association | December 18, 2023 | Best Actor | Bradley Cooper | 3rd place | |
| Dallas–Fort Worth Film Critics Association | December 18, 2023 | Best Actress | Carey Mulligan | 3rd place | |
| Denver Film Critics Society | January 12, 2024 | Best Lead Performance by an Actor, Male | Bradley Cooper | Nominated | |
| Denver Film Critics Society | January 12, 2024 | Best Lead Performance by an Actor, Female | Carey Mulligan | Nominated | |
| Dublin Film Critics' Circle | December 18, 2023 | Best Director | Bradley Cooper | 10th place | |
| Dublin Film Critics' Circle | December 18, 2023 | Best Actor | Bradley Cooper | 3rd place | |
| Dublin Film Critics' Circle | December 18, 2023 | Best Actress | Carey Mulligan | Runner-up | |
| Florida Film Critics Circle | December 21, 2023 | Best Actor | Bradley Cooper | Runner-up | |
| Georgia Film Critics Association | January 5, 2024 | Best Actor | Bradley Cooper | Nominated | |
| Georgia Film Critics Association | January 5, 2024 | Best Actress | Carey Mulligan | Nominated | |
| Georgia Film Critics Association | January 5, 2024 | Best Cinematography | Matthew Libatique | Nominated | |
| Gotham Independent Film Awards | November 27, 2023 | Icon & Creator Tribute | Bradley Cooper | Won | |
| Golden Globe Awards | January 7, 2024 | Best Motion Picture – Drama | Maestro | Nominated | |
| Golden Globe Awards | January 7, 2024 | Best Director | Bradley Cooper | Nominated | |
| Golden Globe Awards | January 7, 2024 | Best Actor – Motion Picture Drama | Bradley Cooper | Nominated | |
| Golden Globe Awards | January 7, 2024 | Best Actress – Motion Picture Drama | Carey Mulligan | Nominated | |
| Golden Reel Awards | March 3, 2024 | Outstanding Achievement in Sound Editing – Feature Dialogue / ADR | Richard King, Rich Bologna, Tony Martinez, Eliza Paley, Jac Rubenstein, Fred Rosenberg, Jason Ruder | Nominated | |
| Golden Reel Awards | March 3, 2024 | Outstanding Achievement in Music Editing – Feature Motion Picture | Jason Ruder, Victoria Ruggiero | Won | |
| Grammy Awards | February 2, 2025 | Best Compilation Soundtrack For Visual Media | Leonard Bernstein, Bradley Cooper & Yannick Nézet-Séguin, Jason Ruder, Steven Gizicki | Won | |
| ICG Publicists Awards | March 8, 2024 | Maxwell Weinberg Award for Motion Picture Publicity Campaign | Maestro | Nominated | |
| Indiana Film Journalists Association | December 17, 2023 | Best Lead Performance | Carey Mulligan | Nominated | |
| Indiana Film Journalists Association | December 17, 2023 | Best Editing | Michelle Tesoro | Nominated | |
| Indiana Film Journalists Association | December 17, 2023 | Best Cinematography | Matthew Libatique | Nominated | |
| Kansas City Film Critics Circle | January 27, 2024 | Tom Poe Award for the Best LGBTQ Film | Maestro | Runner-up | |
| Las Vegas Film Critics Society | December 13, 2023 | Best Picture | Maestro | Nominated | |
| Las Vegas Film Critics Society | December 13, 2023 | Best Director | Bradley Cooper | Nominated | |
| Las Vegas Film Critics Society | December 13, 2023 | Best Actor | Bradley Cooper | Won | |
| Las Vegas Film Critics Society | December 13, 2023 | Best Actress | Carey Mulligan | Nominated | |
| Las Vegas Film Critics Society | December 13, 2023 | Best Original Screenplay | Bradley Cooper and Josh Singer | Won | |
| Las Vegas Film Critics Society | December 13, 2023 | Best Cinematography | Matthew Libatique | Nominated | |
| Las Vegas Film Critics Society | December 13, 2023 | Best Film Editing | Michelle Tesoro | Nominated | |
| London Film Critics' Circle | February 4, 2024 | Actor of the Year | Bradley Cooper | Nominated | |
| London Film Critics' Circle | February 4, 2024 | Actress of the Year | Carey Mulligan | Nominated | |
| London Film Critics' Circle | February 4, 2024 | British/Irish Performer of the Year | Carey Mulligan | Nominated | |
| Make-Up Artists and Hair Stylists Guild | February 18, 2024 | Best Period and/or Character Make-Up | Siân Grigg, Jackie Risotto, Elisa Tallerico, Nicky Pattison-Illum | Won | |
| Make-Up Artists and Hair Stylists Guild | February 18, 2024 | Best Period Hair Styling and/or Character Hair Styling | Kay Georgiou, Lori McCoy-Bell, Jameson Eaton, Amanda Duffy-Evans | Nominated | |
| Make-Up Artists and Hair Stylists Guild | February 18, 2024 | Best Special Make-Up Effects | Kazu Hiro, Siân Grigg, Duncan Jarman, Mike Mekash | Won | |
| Middleburg Film Festival | October 22, 2023 | Distinguished Makeup Artist Award | Kazu Hiro | Won | |
| Minnesota Film Critics Alliance | February 4, 2024 | Best Picture | Maestro | Nominated | |
| Minnesota Film Critics Alliance | February 4, 2024 | Best Actor | Bradley Cooper | Nominated | |
| Minnesota Film Critics Alliance | February 4, 2024 | Best Actress | Carey Mulligan | Nominated | |
| Minnesota Film Critics Alliance | February 4, 2024 | Best Cinematography | Matthew Libatique | Nominated | |
| Minnesota Film Critics Alliance | February 4, 2024 | Best Editing | Michelle Tesoro | Nominated | |
| Minnesota Film Critics Alliance | February 4, 2024 | Best Costume/Make-Up | Mark Bridges and Kazu Hiro | Nominated | |
| Minnesota Film Critics Alliance | February 4, 2024 | Best Sound | Maestro | Nominated | |
| National Board of Review | December 6, 2023 | Top Ten Films | Maestro | Won (Note: This award does not have a single winner as it recognizes multiple films.) | |
| Nevada Film Critics Society | December 23, 2023 | Best Actor | Bradley Cooper | Won | |
| New York Film Critics Online | December 15, 2023 | Top 10 Films | Maestro | Won | |
| Oklahoma Film Critics Circle | January 3, 2024 | Most Disappointing Film | Maestro | Won | |
| Palm Springs International Film Festival | January 4, 2024 | International Star Award – Actress | Carey Mulligan | Won | |
| Phoenix Film Critics Society | December 18, 2023 | Top Ten Films of 2023 | Maestro | Won | |
| Producers Guild of America Awards | February 25, 2024 | Best Theatrical Motion Picture | Maestro | Nominated | |
| San Francisco Bay Area Film Critics Circle | January 9, 2024 | Best Actor | Bradley Cooper | Nominated | |
| Santa Barbara International Film Festival | February 8, 2024 | Outstanding Performer of the Year | Bradley Cooper | Won | |
| Satellite Awards | February 18, 2024 | Best Film | Maestro | Nominated | |
| Satellite Awards | February 18, 2024 | Best Actor in a Motion Picture – Drama | Bradley Cooper | Nominated | |
| Satellite Awards | February 18, 2024 | Best Actress in a Motion Picture – Drama | Carey Mulligan | Nominated | |
| Satellite Awards | February 18, 2024 | Best Original Screenplay | Bradley Cooper and Josh Singer | Won | |
| Satellite Awards | February 18, 2024 | Best Cinematography | Matthew Libatique | Won | |
| Satellite Awards | February 18, 2024 | Best Editing | Michelle Tesoro | Nominated | |
| Satellite Awards | February 18, 2024 | Best Sound | Maestro | Won | |
| Satellite Awards | February 18, 2024 | Best Production Design | Kevin Thompson and Rena DeAngelo | Nominated | |
| Screen Actors Guild Awards | February 24, 2024 | Outstanding Actor in a Leading Role | Bradley Cooper | Nominated | |
| Screen Actors Guild Awards | February 24, 2024 | Outstanding Actor in a Leading Role | Carey Mulligan | Nominated | |
| Set Decorators Society of America Awards | February 13, 2024 | Best Achievement in Décor/Design of a Period Feature Film | Rena DeAngelo and Kevin Thompson | Nominated | |
| St. Louis Film Critics Association | December 17, 2023 | Best Film | Maestro | Nominated | |
| St. Louis Film Critics Association | December 17, 2023 | Best Actor | Bradley Cooper | Nominated | |
| St. Louis Film Critics Association | December 17, 2023 | Best Cinematography | Matthew Libatique | Runner-up | |
| St. Louis Film Critics Association | December 17, 2023 | Best Editing | Michelle Tosoro | Nominated | |
| St. Louis Film Critics Association | December 17, 2023 | Best Soundtrack | Maestro | Nominated | |
| St. Louis Film Critics Association | December 17, 2023 | Best Scene | Mahler's Second Symphony in Ely Cathedral | Nominated | |
| Vancouver Film Critics Circle | February 12, 2024 | Best Male Actor | Bradley Cooper | Nominated | |
| Venice International Film Festival | September 9, 2023 | Golden Lion | Bradley Cooper | Nominated | |
| Venice International Film Festival | September 9, 2023 | Queer Lion | Bradley Cooper | Nominated | |
| Virginia Film Festival | October 29, 2023 | Craft Award | Kazu Hiro | Won | |
| Washington D.C. Area Film Critics Association | December 10, 2023 | Best Actor | Bradley Cooper | Nominated | |
| Washington D.C. Area Film Critics Association | December 10, 2023 | Best Cinematography | Matthew Libatique | Nominated | |
| Washington D.C. Area Film Critics Association | December 10, 2023 | Best Editing | Michelle Tesoro | Nominated | |
