= Lucy Pardee =

British casting director

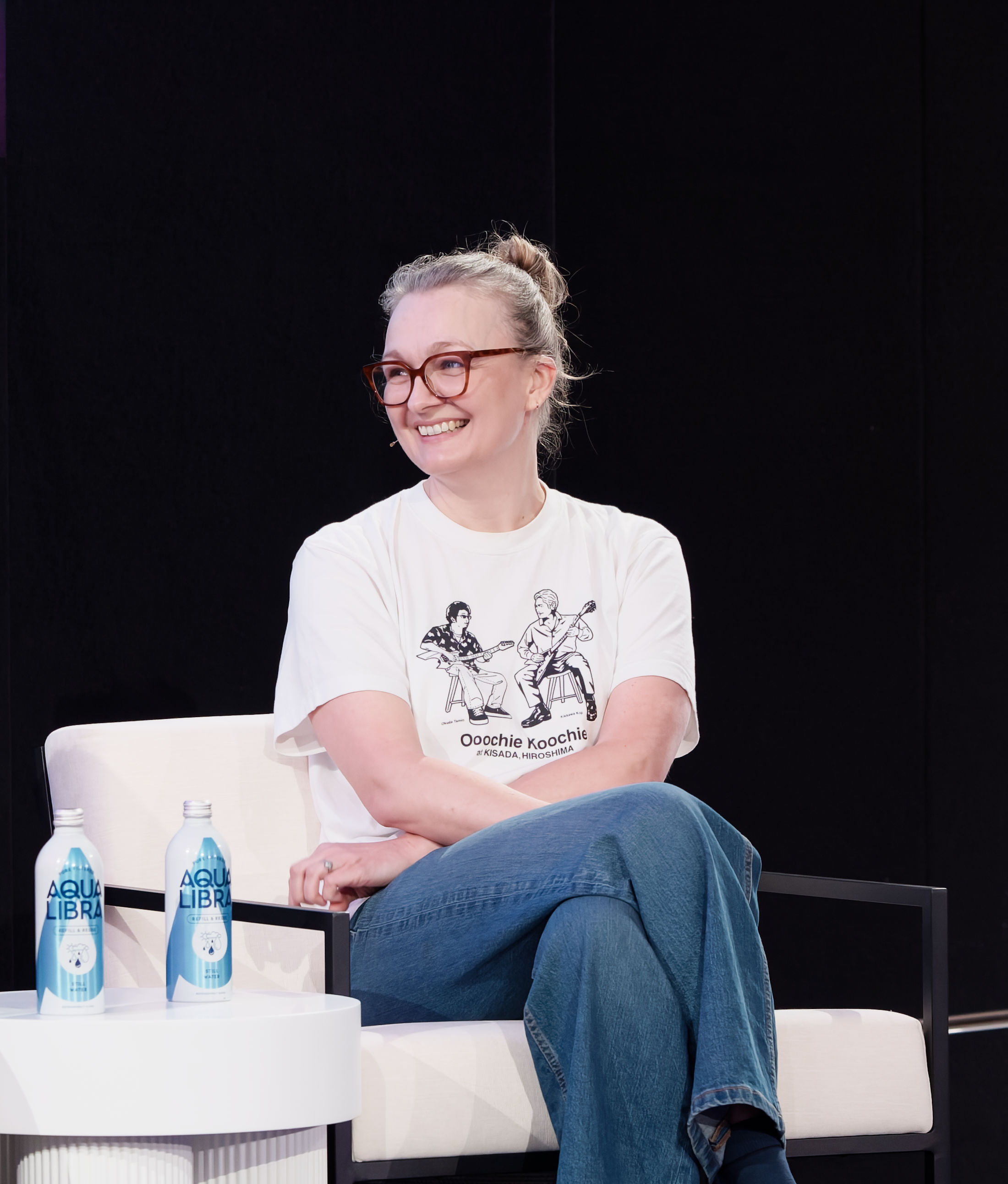
- Pardee in 2026
- Occupation: Casting director
- Awards: BAFTA Award for Best Casting (2020)
- Website: lucypardee.com/

Lucy Pardee is a British casting director, who is an exponent of street casting. Pardee used this to great effect in her work on Rocks, for which she received a BAFTA award for Casting Direction in 2021. She was the second person to receive the accolade since its introduction in 2019, when it was awarded to Shayna Markowitz. Pardee was nominated for second BAFTA award in 2022 for her work on the film Aftersun. She has spoken out about how the Academy Awards should also introduce an award for casting direction.

Pardee has also commented about how she sees her work in street casting as a key route for new talent into the industry, particularly in the UK, where according to her provision for drama for young people, both in and outside education, has been "decimated by the Tory government".

== Filmography ==
- Silver Haze (2023)
- Aftersun (2022)
- Perfect 10 (2019)
- Rocks (2019)
- Dirty God (2019)
- The Devil Outside (2019)
- American Honey (2016)
- Catch Me Daddy (2014)
- Wuthering Heights (2011)

== Awards ==
- BAFTA Award for Best Casting (2020 - winner)
- Semiramis Award for Excellence in Casting (2021 - winner)
- British Independent Film Awards (2021 - winner)
- London Critics Circle Film Awards (2021 - winner)
- British Independent Film Awards (2022 - nominee)
- BAFTA Award for Best Casting (2023 - nominee)
