= Jason Ruder =

American sound engineer

- Occupation: Sound engineer

Jason Ruder is an American sound engineer. He was nominated for two Academy Awards in the category Best Sound for the films A Star Is Born and Maestro.

== Selected filmography ==
- A Star Is Born (2018; co-nominated with Tom Ozanich, Dean A. Zupancic and Steven A. Morrow)
- Maestro (2023; co-nominated with Steve A. Morrow, Richard King, Tom Ozanich and Dean A. Zupancic)
