= Tom Ozanich =

American sound engineer

- Occupation: Sound engineer

Tom Ozanich is an American sound engineer. He was nominated for four Academy Awards in the category Best Sound for the films A Star Is Born, Joker, The Creator and Maestro.

== Selected filmography ==
- A Star Is Born (2018; co-nominated with Dean A. Zupancic, Jason Ruder and Steven A. Morrow)
- Joker (2019; co-nominated with Dean Zupancic and Tod A. Maitland)
- The Creator (2023; co-nominated with Ian Voigt, Erik Aadahl, Ethan Van der Ryn and Dean A. Zupancic)
- Maestro (2023; co-nominated with Steven A. Morrow, Richard King, Jason Ruder and Dean A. Zupancic)
