= Tom Cothran =

American musicologist and composer (1947–1987)

Thomas Walter Cothran
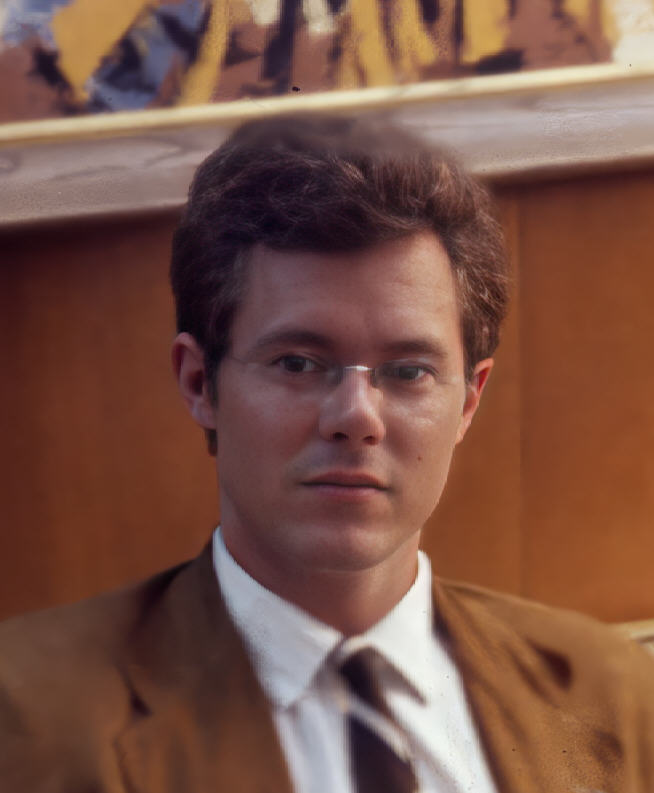
- Tom Cothran in 1973

Background information
- Born: May 19, 1947; San Antonio, Texas
- Died: March 17, 1987 (aged 39)
- Genres: Classical
- Occupations: Musicologist, composer
- Instrument: Piano

Thomas Walter Cothran (1947–1987) was an American musicologist and composer, notable for his professional collaboration and personal relationship with American conductor and composer Leonard Bernstein.

== Early life and education ==
Tom Cothran was born in San Antonio to parents Walter M. and Betty (Nogle) Cothran. Walter was at the time a business equipment salesman. The family remained in Texas for some years, then moved to Pasadena, California, where Tom graduated from Pasadena High School in 1965. Cothran attended Northwestern University for two years, then transferred to UC Berkeley where he studied music and became interested in linguistics. Never graduating, he found employment at San Francisco radio station KKHI (then an all-classical format), rising to program director. Cothran met Bernstein at a party in 1971 and quickly found common interests with the composer/conductor. Bernstein introduced Cothran to acquaintances and friends within the former's social and professional orbit. Multiple sources report that the two became lovers.

== As assistant to Bernstein ==
Cothran assisted and advised Bernstein in small ways during the period of development of the latter's Mass (1971) and was a frequent house guest in the Bernstein household. The pair's romantic relationship was kept hidden. From 1972, he was employed by Bernstein's Amberson Enterprises as an assistant to the maestro, initially for the development of what became Bernstein's Harvard Norton Lectures. He relocated to Cambridge for this work. Regarding the Norton Lectures, critic Mark Swed credits Cothran as the source of their Chomskian approach and "practically their ghost writer", but reports that Cothran later characterized his own role as "preventing them from becoming even more embarrassing than they already were".

Cothran continued as an associate of Bernstein's during the period of development of the latter's failed musical, 1600 Pennsylvania Avenue (1976), also studying piano informally under Harvard's Luise Vosgerchian. As widely reported, the hidden side of Bernstein's relationship with Cothran became untenable in 1976 when Felicia Bernstein insisted that it end. Instead, Bernstein announced publicly his intention to live as a gay man, and separated from his wife. Felicia and daughter Jamie Bernstein came to see Cothran as an immoral, or at least irresponsible, seducer, a perspective reflected in early biographies of the composer after his death.

Bernstein and Cothran lived together in venues including Paris and Palm Springs for about two years, during which Cothran participated in the development of Bernstein's Songfest, the two reportedly reading poetry to each other and selecting the poems that make up the piece, including some dealing with homosexuality. They collaborated on a never-completed opera based on Nabokov's Lolita, Cothran to provide the libretto. Their intimate relationship ended in 1977 with Bernstein's return to his marriage under tragic circumstances. The two remained friends and confidants and exchanged letters.

== Later life and death ==
Cothran traveled widely, including to Nepal and India, returning to the United States in 1981 with a rare lymphoma, later recognized as one of the earliest cases of AIDS. He moved to New York City and was active in AIDS hospice work until his own illness made this impossible. Peter Napolitano, a friend of Cothran's at this time, reported that Bernstein's organization paid for Cothran's living and medical expenses, and that Bernstein visited Cothran at his Christopher Street walk-up apartment four months before Cothran's death in 1987.

A memorial event for Cothran was arranged by the Amberson organization. Music critic Mark Swed points to Cothran's death as an influence on Bernstein's engagement in producing "Music for Life", a star-studded benefit for a leading New York AIDS organization at Carnegie Hall in November, 1987.

== In popular culture ==
Actor and playwright Martin Julien's The Unanswered Question premiered at the National Arts Centre in Ottawa in March, 2007, with Tom McCamus as Bernstein. The play dramatizes the composer's angst in choosing between Felicia (played by Chick Reid) and Tom (played by Graeme Somerville).

Cothran is played by Gideon Glick in Bradley Cooper's 2023 film Maestro. Glick, a gay actor, describes his sympathetic portrait of Cothran as possible with 2023's more "authentic and honest" perspective on mid-century gay culture.
