= Alpha Data =

Music analytics firm

- Formerly: BuzzAngle Music
- Industry: Music analytics
- Founded: 2013
- Defunct: 2021
- Website: www.buzzanglemusic.com

Alpha Data (formerly, but commonly known as BuzzAngle Music) was a music analytics firm which provided statistics for the music industry, including record sales and music streaming. BuzzAngle partnered with Rolling Stone to provide information for the magazine's music charts.

BuzzAngle was founded in 2013 by Border City Media. It used big data collected from platforms used by people to listen to music. Its website showed total music consumption, including album sales, song sales, streaming history, and social media analytics. The data it collected came from retailers, record stores, radio stations, and music venues. In 2018, BuzzAngle received an investment from Penske Media Corporation, the parent company of Rolling Stone. The following year it announced a partnership with Rolling Stone to provide data for the magazine's music charts, which would openly compete with those of the long-established music charts in Billboard.

In 2021, Penske Media purchased Billboard, and discontinued music charts in its Rolling Stone holding. As of July 2024, Alpha Data/BuzzAngle has no web presence nor functioning website.
