= Dallas–Fort Worth Film Critics Association Award for Best Actor =

Annual US film award

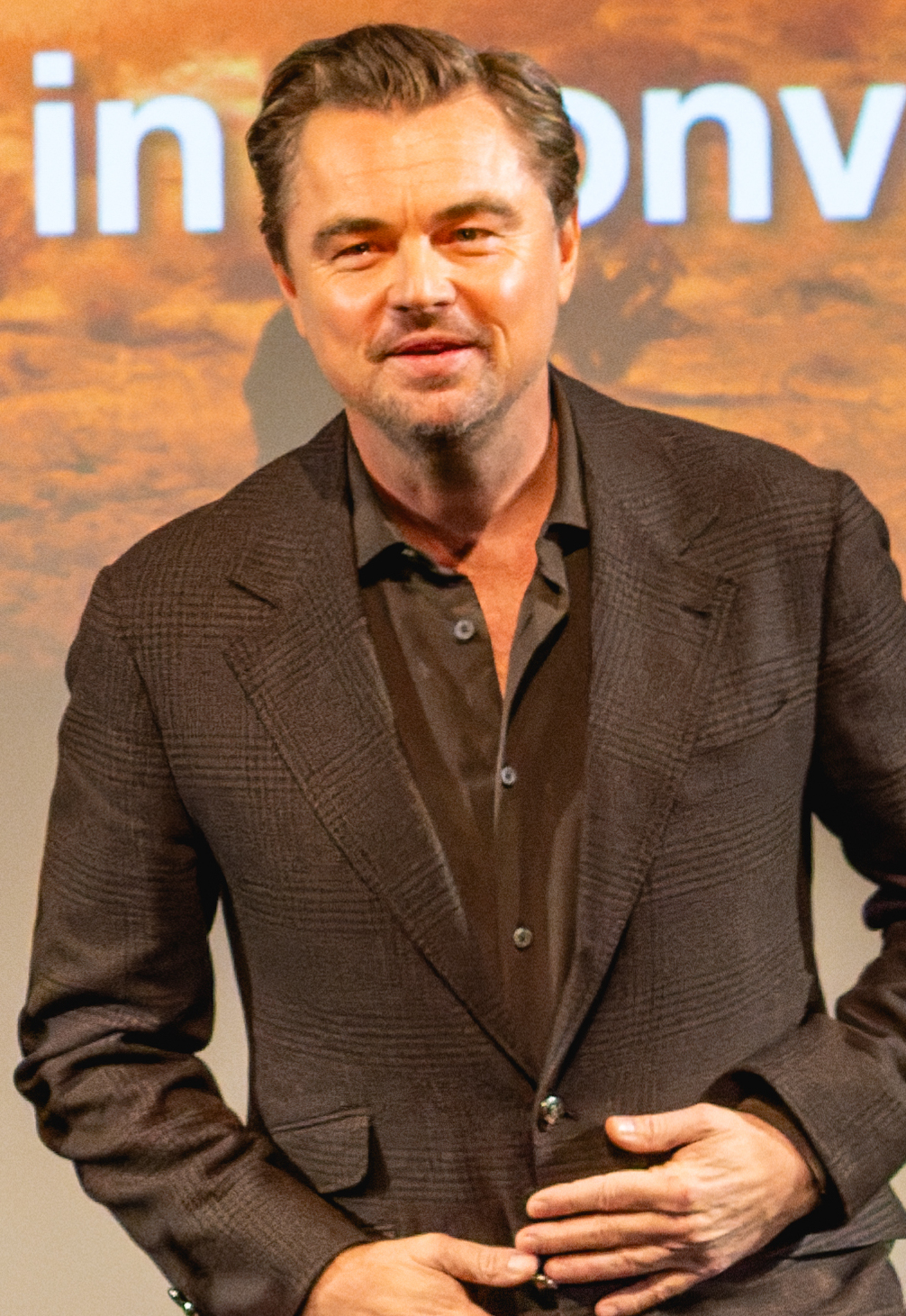
- The 2025 recipient: Leonardo DiCaprio
- Awarded for: Best Performance by an Actor in a Leading Role
- Country: United States
- Presented by: Dallas–Fort Worth Film Critics Association
- First award: Jeremy Irons; Reversal of Fortune (1990)
- Currently held by: Leonardo DiCaprio; One Battle After Another (2025)
- Website: dfwcritics.com

The Dallas–Fort Worth Film Critics Association Award for Best Actor is an award presented by the Dallas–Fort Worth Film Critics Association. It is given in honor of an actor who has delivered an outstanding performance in a leading role.

== Winners and nominees ==
=== 1990s ===
1990: Jeremy Irons as Claus von Bülow – Reversal of Fortune

- Gérard Depardieu as Cyrano de Bergerac – Cyrano de Bergerac
- Richard Harris as Bull McCabe – The Field

1991: Anthony Hopkins as Dr. Hannibal Lecter – The Silence of the Lambs

1992: Denzel Washington as Malcolm X – Malcolm X

1993: Anthony Hopkins as Mr. James Stevens – The Remains of the Day

1994: Tom Hanks as Forrest Gump – Forrest Gump

1995: Nicolas Cage as Ben Sanderson – Leaving Las Vegas

1996: Geoffrey Rush as David Helfgott – Shine

1997: Peter Fonda as Ulysses "Ulee" Jackson – Ulee's Gold

1998: Jim Carrey as Truman Burbank – The Truman Show

1999: Kevin Spacey as Lester Burnham – American Beauty

=== 2000s ===
2000: Russell Crowe as Maximus Decimus Meridius – Gladiator

- Sean Connery as William Forrester – Finding Forrester
- Michael Douglas as Professor Grady Tripp – Wonder Boys
- Tom Hanks as Chuck Noland – Cast Away
- Geoffrey Rush as Marquis de Sade – Quills

2001: Russell Crowe as John Nash – A Beautiful Mind

- Will Smith as Muhammad Ali – Ali
- Billy Bob Thornton as Ed Crane – The Man Who Wasn't There
- Denzel Washington as Detective Sergeant Alonzo Harris – Training Day
- Tom Wilkinson as Matt Fowler – In the Bedroom

2002: Jack Nicholson as Warren Schmidt – About Schmidt

- Adrien Brody as Władysław Szpilman – The Pianist
- Nicolas Cage as Charlie Kaufman and Donald Kaufman – Adaptation.
- Daniel Day-Lewis as Bill "The Butcher" Cutting – Gangs of New York
- Robin Williams as Seymour "Sy" Parrish – One Hour Photo

2003: Sean Penn as Jimmy Markum – Mystic River

- Johnny Depp as Captain Jack Sparrow – Pirates of the Caribbean: The Curse of the Black Pearl
- Paul Giamatti as Harvey Pekar – American Splendor
- Ben Kingsley as Colonel Massoud Amir Behrani – House of Sand and Fog
- Bill Murray as Bob Harris – Lost in Translation

2004: Paul Giamatti as Miles Raymond – Sideways

- Don Cheadle as Paul Rusesabagina – Hotel Rwanda
- Johnny Depp as J. M. Barrie – Finding Neverland
- Leonardo DiCaprio as Howard Hughes – The Aviator
- Jamie Foxx as Ray Charles – Ray

2005: Philip Seymour Hoffman as Truman Capote – Capote

- Russell Crowe as James J. Braddock – Cinderella Man
- Heath Ledger as Ennis Del Mar – Brokeback Mountain
- Joaquin Phoenix as Johnny Cash – Walk the Line
- David Strathairn as Edward R. Murrow – Good Night, and Good Luck.

2006: Forest Whitaker as Idi Amin – The Last King of Scotland

- Leonardo DiCaprio as Danny Archer – Blood Diamond
- Leonardo DiCaprio as William "Billy" Costigan Jr. – The Departed
- Ryan Gosling as Dan Dunne – Half Nelson
- Peter O'Toole as Maurice Russell – Venus

2007: Daniel Day-Lewis as Daniel Plainview – There Will Be Blood

- George Clooney as Michael Clayton – Michael Clayton
- Emile Hirsch as Chris McCandless – Into the Wild
- Tommy Lee Jones as Hank Deerfield – In the Valley of Elah
- Frank Langella as Leonard Schiller – Starting Out in the Evening

2008: Sean Penn as Harvey Milk – Milk

- Richard Jenkins as Walter Vale – The Visitor
- Frank Langella as Richard Nixon – Frost/Nixon
- Brad Pitt as Benjamin Button – The Curious Case of Benjamin Button
- Mickey Rourke as Robin Ramzinski / Randy "The Ram" Robinson – The Wrestler

2009: George Clooney as Ryan Bingham – Up in the Air

- Jeff Bridges as Otis "Bad" Blake – Crazy Heart
- Colin Firth as George Falconer – A Single Man
- Morgan Freeman as Nelson Mandela – Invictus
- Jeremy Renner as Staff Sergeant William James – The Hurt Locker

=== 2010s ===
2010: James Franco as Aron Ralston – 127 Hours

- Michael Douglas as Ben Kalmen – Solitary Man
- Robert Duvall as Felix Bush – Get Low
- Jesse Eisenberg as Mark Zuckerberg – The Social Network
- Colin Firth as King George VI – The King's Speech

2011: George Clooney as Matt King – The Descendants

- Jean Dujardin as George Valentin – The Artist
- Michael Fassbender as Brandon Sullivan – Shame
- Brad Pitt as Billy Beane – Moneyball
- Michael Shannon as Curtis LaForche – Take Shelter

2012: Daniel Day-Lewis as Abraham Lincoln – Lincoln

- John Hawkes as Mark O'Brien – The Sessions
- Hugh Jackman as Jean Valjean – Les Misérables
- Joaquin Phoenix as Freddie Quell – The Master
- Denzel Washington as Captain William "Whip" Whitaker Sr. – Flight

2013: Matthew McConaughey as Ron Woodroof – Dallas Buyers Club

- Bruce Dern as Woody Grant – Nebraska
- Leonardo DiCaprio as Jordan Belfort – The Wolf of Wall Street
- Chiwetel Ejiofor as Solomon Northup – 12 Years a Slave
- Tom Hanks as Captain Richard Phillips – Captain Phillips

2014: Michael Keaton as Riggan Thomson – Birdman or (The Unexpected Virtue of Ignorance)

- Benedict Cumberbatch as Alan Turing – The Imitation Game
- Jake Gyllenhaal as Louis "Lou" Bloom – Nightcrawler
- Eddie Redmayne as Stephen Hawking – The Theory of Everything
- Timothy Spall as J. M. W. Turner – Mr. Turner

2015: Leonardo DiCaprio as Hugh Glass – The Revenant

- Matt Damon as Mark Watney – The Martian
- Johnny Depp as James "Whitey" Bulger – Black Mass
- Michael Fassbender as Steve Jobs – Steve Jobs
- Eddie Redmayne as Einar Wegener / Lili Elbe – The Danish Girl

2016: Casey Affleck as Lee Chandler – Manchester by the Sea

- Joel Edgerton as Richard Loving – Loving
- Ryan Gosling as Sebastian Wilder – La La Land
- Tom Hanks as Chesley "Sully" Sullenberger – Sully
- Denzel Washington as Troy Maxson – Fences

2017: Gary Oldman as Winston Churchill – Darkest Hour

- Timothée Chalamet as Elio Perlman – Call Me by Your Name
- Daniel Day-Lewis as Reynolds Woodcock – Phantom Thread
- James Franco as Tommy Wiseau – The Disaster Artist
- Tom Hanks as Ben Bradlee – The Post

2018: Christian Bale as Dick Cheney – Vice

- Bradley Cooper as Jackson Maine – A Star Is Born
- Ethan Hawke as Reverend Ernst Toller – First Reformed
- Rami Malek as Freddie Mercury – Bohemian Rhapsody
- Viggo Mortensen as Frank "Tony Lip" Vallelonga – Green Book

2019: Adam Driver as Charlie Barber – Marriage Story

- Antonio Banderas as Salvador Mallo – Pain and Glory
- Robert De Niro as Frank Sheeran – The Irishman
- Leonardo DiCaprio as Rick Dalton – Once Upon a Time in Hollywood
- Joaquin Phoenix as Arthur Fleck / Joker – Joker

=== 2020s ===
2020: Chadwick Boseman as Levee Green – Ma Rainey's Black Bottom

- Riz Ahmed as Ruben Stone – Sound of Metal
- Anthony Hopkins as Anthony – The Father
- Delroy Lindo as Paul – Da 5 Bloods
- Gary Oldman as Herman J. Mankiewicz – Mank

2021: Benedict Cumberbatch as Phil Burbank – The Power of the Dog

- Peter Dinklage as Cyrano de Bergerac – Cyrano
- Andrew Garfield as Jonathan Larson – tick, tick... BOOM!
- Will Smith as Richard Williams – King Richard
- Denzel Washington as Lord Macbeth – The Tragedy of Macbeth

2022: Colin Farrell as Pádraic Súilleabháin – The Banshees of Inisherin

- Austin Butler as Elvis Presley – Elvis
- Tom Cruise as Captain Pete "Maverick" Mitchell – Top Gun: Maverick
- Brendan Fraser as Charlie – The Whale
- Bill Nighy as Mr. Williams – Living

2023: Cillian Murphy as J. Robert Oppenheimer – Oppenheimer

- Paul Giamatti as Paul Dunham – The Holdovers
- Bradley Cooper as Leonard Bernstein – Maestro
- Leonardo DiCaprio as Ernest Burkhart – Killers of the Flower Moon
- Colman Domingo as Bayard Rustin – Rustin

2024: Ralph Fiennes as Cardinal Thomas Lawrence – Conclave

- Adrien Brody as László Tóth – The Brutalist
- Timothée Chalamet as Bob Dylan – A Complete Unknown
- Colman Domingo as John "Divine G" Whitfield – Sing Sing
- Hugh Grant as Mr. Reed – Heretic
