= Shayna Markowitz =

American casting director

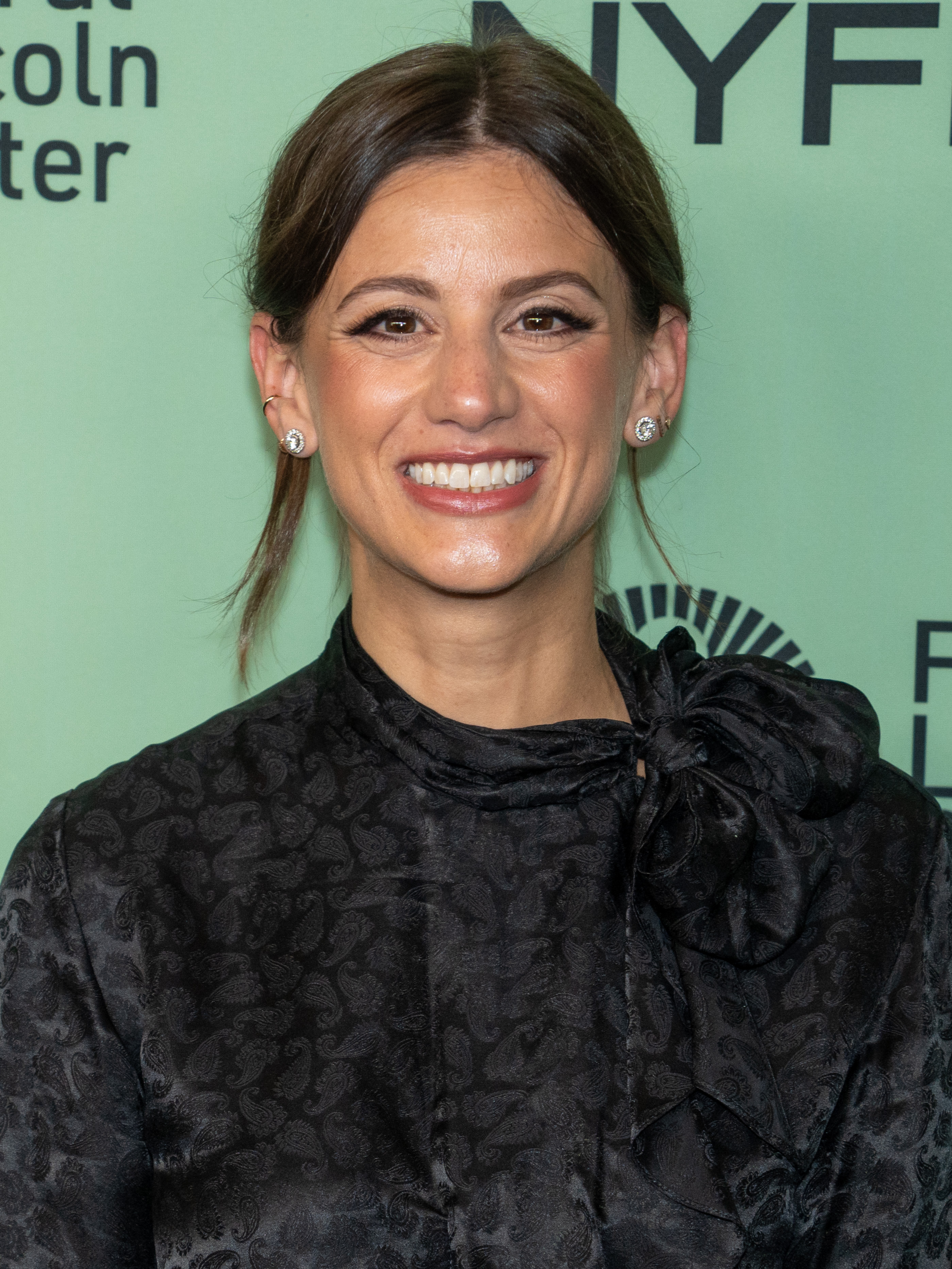
- Markowitz in 2025
- Occupation: Casting director
- Agent: Shauna Perlman
- Known for: Inaugural recipient of BAFTA Award for Best Casting
- Notable work: Joker
- Awards: BAFTA Award for Best Casting (2019)

Shayna Markowitz is an American casting director, who is the recipient of the inaugural BAFTA Award for Best Casting in 2020 in recognition of her work on the film Joker. She works across film and television, and casting director credits also include Dash & Lily (2020), The Best of Enemies (2019) and Ocean's 8 (2018), amongst others.

== Career ==
Markowitz is an American casting director, whose first role in casting was as an assistant to casting director Debra Zane. Her first credit in the profession followed in 2008 for her work as casting assistant on Guillermo Arriaga’s The Burning Plain. She is the recipient of the inaugural BAFTA Award for Best Casting in 2020. The award was made in recognition of her work on the film Joker, which starred Joaquin Phoenix. Markowitz is credited in particular with attaching Sharon Washington and Leigh Gill as cast members of the film. It was accepted on Markowitz's behalf by Zazie Beetz. In 2020 she was nominated for an Artios Award for Joker, but lost to casting director Victoria Thomas for Once Upon a Time in Hollywood. She has also worked on Ocean's 8 and The Hunger Games franchise. She has spoken out on how she tries through her work to cast against type. She is a member of the Casting Society of America. As of 2022 Markowitz was working on the casting for the Leonard Bernstein biopic Maestro.

== Casting director filmography ==
- Dash & Lily (2020)
- Joker (2019)
- The Best of Enemies (2019)
- Wolverine (2018)
- Last Supper (2018)
- Ocean's 8 (2018)
- Sas & Jake (2017)
- Bloodline (2017)
- Purple Haze (2017)
- Are You Joking? (2014)

== Awards ==
- 2021: Daytime Emmy Award for Outstanding Casting for a Drama or Daytime Fiction Program (nominee)
- 2020: 73rd British Academy Film Awards - BAFTA Award for Best Casting (winner)
- 2020: Artios Award for Outstanding Achievement in Casting – Big Budget Feature (Drama) (nominee)
- 2018: Artios Award for Outstanding Achievement in Casting - Television Series - Drama (nominee)
- 2017: Artios Award for Outstanding Achievement in Casting - Television Series - Drama (winner)
- 2016: Artios Award for Outstanding Achievement in Casting - Television Series - Drama (nominee)
