= Phoenix Film Critics Society =

Film critics association in Arizona, US

- Abbreviation: PFCS
- Formation: 2000
- Type: Film criticism
- Location: Phoenix, Arizona, United States
- Website: phoenixfilmcriticssociety.org

The Phoenix Film Critics Society (PFCS) is an organization made up of professional film critics and journalists based in Arizona, United States. Co-founded by David Ramsey and Roger Tennis in 2000, its members also serve as judges of the Phoenix Film Festival and the Scottsdale International Film Festival.

In December of each year, the PFCS meets to vote on their Phoenix Film Critics Society Awards for films released in the same calendar year. Categories include Best Picture, Best Director, Best Actor in a Leading Role, Best Actress in a Leading Role and Best Ensemble Acting.

== Award categories ==
- Top 10 Films
- Best Picture
- Best Director
- Best Actor in a Leading Role
- Best Actress in a Leading Role
- Best Actor in a Supporting Role
- Best Actress in a Supporting Role
- Best Ensemble Acting
- Best Original Screenplay
- Best Screenplay Adapted from Other Material
- The Overlooked Film of the Year
- Best Animated Film
- Best Foreign Language Film
- Best Documentary
- Best Original Song
- Best Original Score
- Best Cinematography
- Best Film Editing
- Best Production Design
- Best Costume Design
- Best Visual Effects
- Breakthrough Performance
- Best Performance by a Youth

== Best Picture winners ==
Year	Best Picture	Ref.
2025	One Battle After Another	
2024	The Brutalist	
2023	Killers of the Flower Moon	
2022	Everything Everywhere All at Once	
2021	Belfast	
2020	Nomadland	
2019	Joker	
2018	Green Book	
2017	The Shape of Water	
2016	La La Land	
2015	Spotlight	
2014	Birdman	
2013	12 Years a Slave	
2012	Argo	
2011	The Artist	
2010	The King's Speech	
2009	Inglourious Basterds	
2008	Slumdog Millionaire	
2007	No Country for Old Men	
2006	United 93	
2005	Cinderella Man	
2004	The Aviator	
2003	The Lord of the Rings: The Return of the King	
2002	The Lord of the Rings: The Two Towers	
2001	The Lord of the Rings: The Fellowship of the Ring	
2000	Almost Famous	

== Membership ==
A complete and current list of members is maintained on the association's website. Notable and past members include:

- Vique Rojas (film critic and Rocky Mountain Emmy Award recipient)
- Jim Ferguson (former KGUN-TV personality and Broadcast Film Critics Association board member)
- Bill Muller (former The Arizona Republic journalist)

== See also ==
- List of film awards
