= Steven A. Morrow =

American Production sound mixer

Steven Morrow
- Occupation: production sound mixer
- Years active: 1994–present
- Spouse: Ten Morrow

Steven A. Morrow is an American production sound mixer.

Morrow has been nominated for the Academy Award for Best Sound or Best Achievement in Sound Mixing a total of four times for his work on La La Land, A Star is Born, Ford v Ferrari, and Maestro. He has been nominated for three BAFTA Awards for Best Sound for La La Land, A Star is Born (2018), and Ford v Ferrari.

== Awards ==
- Nominated: Academy Award for Best Sound Mixing - Ford v Ferrari
- Nominated: Academy Award for Best Sound Mixing - A Star is Born
- Nominated: Academy Award for Best Sound Mixing - La La Land
- Nominated: BAFTA Award for Best Sound - Ford v Ferrari
- Nominated: BAFTA Award for Best Sound - A Star is Born
- Nominated: BAFTA Award for Best Sound - La La Land
- Winner: Cinema Audio Society Award for Outstanding Achievement in Sound Mixing for a Motion Picture – Live Action - La La Land
- Nominated: Satellite Award for Best Sound - La La Land
