= Dean A. Zupancic =

American sound engineer

- Born: 1959 (age 66–67)
- Occupation: Sound engineer
- Years active: 1986-present

Dean A. Zupancic (born 1959) is an American sound engineer. He has been nominated for four Academy Awards in the category of Best Sound Mixing for the films The Chronicles of Narnia: The Lion, the Witch and the Wardrobe, A Star Is Born, and Joker. He has worked on more than 120 films since 1986.

== Selected filmography ==
- Beauty and the Beast (1991)
- The Lion King (1994)
- Pulp Fiction (1994)
- Houseguest (1995)
- A Pyromaniac's Love Story (1995)
- Pocahontas (1995)
- Operation Dumbo Drop (1995)
- Father of the Bride Part II (1995)
- Mr. Holland's Opus (1995)
- Homeward Bound II: Lost in San Francisco (1996)
- Eddie (1996)
- The Hunchback of Notre Dame (1996)
- 2 Days in the Valley (1996)
- 101 Dalmatians (1996)
- Metro (1997)
- Anna Karenina (1997)
- George of the Jungle (1997)
- Rocket Man (1997)
- Flubber (1997)
- Mr. Magoo (1997)
- Mulan (1998)
- Holy Man (1998)
- 10 Things I Hate About You (1999)
- Instinct (1999)
- Inspector Gadget (1999)
- Teaching Mrs. Tingle (1999)
- Music of the Heart (1999)
- Dinosaur (2000)
- Disney's The Kid (2000)
- The Emperor's New Groove (2000)
- The Majestic (2001)
- Lilo & Stitch (2002)
- The Santa Clause 2 (2002)
- Treasure Planet (2002)
- Home on the Range (2004)
- Coach Carter (2005)
- The Chronicles of Narnia: The Lion, the Witch and the Wardrobe (2005)
- The Santa Clause 3: The Escape Clause (2006)
- The Chronicles of Narnia: Prince Caspian (2008)
- The Princess and the Frog (2009)
- Wind River (2017)
- Stronger (2017)
- Sicario: Day of the Soldado (2018)
- A Star Is Born (2018)
- The Mule (2018)
- Joker (2019)
