= Artios Award for Outstanding Achievement in Casting – Studio or Independent (Comedy) =

- Presented by: Casting Society of America
- Established: 2010
- Currently held by: Rental Family (2026)

The Artios Award for Outstanding Achievement in Casting - Studio or Independent (Comedy) is an award handed out annually by the Casting Society of America.

== Winners and nominees ==
=== 2010s ===
Year	Film	Casting Director(s)
2010 (26th)
2010 (26th)	The Hangover	Juel Bestrop and Seth Yanklewitz
2010 (26th)	(500) Days of Summer	Eyde Belasco
2010 (26th)	Away We Go	Ellen Lewis and Debra Zane
2010 (26th)	Kick-Ass	Lucinda Syson and Sarah Halley Finn
2010 (26th)	Taking Woodstock	Avy Kaufman
2011 (27th)
2011 (27th)	The Kids Are All Right	Laura Rosenthal and Liz Dean (Los Angeles Casting)
2011 (27th)	Easy A	Lisa Miller Katz
2011 (27th)	I Love You Phillip Morris	Bernard Telsey
2011 (27th)	It's Kind of a Funny Story	Cindy Tolan
2011 (27th)	Soul Surfer	Joey Paul Jensen
2012 (28th)
2012 (28th)	The Artist	Heidi Levitt and Michael Sanford (Associate)
2012 (28th)	50/50	Francine Maisler
2012 (28th)	Friends With Kids	Bernard Telsey, Tiffany Little Canfield and David Vaccari
2012 (28th)	The Guard	Jina Jay
2012 (28th)	Hysteria	Gaby Kester
2013 (29th)
2013 (29th)	Moonrise Kingdom	Douglas Aibel and Henry Russell Bergstein (Associate)
2013 (29th)	Hitchcock	Terri Taylor and John McAlary (Associate)
2013 (29th)	Pitch Perfect	Kerry Barden, Paul Schnee and Tracy Kilpatrick (Location Casting)
2013 (29th)	Seven Psychopaths	Sarah Halley Finn and Tamara Hunter
2013 (29th)	To Rome with Love	Patricia DiCerto and Beatrice Kruger
2015 (30th)
2015 (30th)	The Grand Budapest Hotel	Douglas Aibel, Jina Jay and Henry Russell Bergstein (Associate)
2015 (30th)	Big Eyes	Jeanne McCarthy, Nicole Abellera, Coreen Mayrs (Location Casting) and Heike Brandstatter (Location Casting)
2015 (30th)	Chef	Sarah Halley Finn and Tamara Hunter (Associate)
2015 (30th)	Pride	Fiona Weir
2015 (30th)	St. Vincent	Laura Rosenthal
2015 (30th)	Top Five	Victoria Thomas, Matthew Maisto (Associate)
2016 (31st)
2016 (31st)	Me and Earl and the Dying Girl	Angela Demo; Location Casting: Nancy Mosser and Katie Shenot
2016 (31st)	Infinitely Polar Bear	Location Casting: Carolyn Pickman; Associate: Henry Russell Bergstein
2016 (31st)	Ricki and the Flash	Bernard Telsey, Tiffany Little Canfield; Associate: Conrad Woolfe
2016 (31st)	Sleeping with Other People	Jennifer Euston and Emer O'Callaghan
2016 (31st)	While We're Young	Douglas Aibel and Francine Maisler; Associate: Henry Russell Bergstein
2017 (32nd)
2017 (32nd)	Hell or High Water	Richard Hicks and Jo Edna Boldin; Associate: Chris Redondo and Marie A.K. McMaster
2017 (32nd)	20th Century Women	Laura Rosenthal and Mark Bennett
2017 (32nd)	Bad Moms	Cathy Sandrich Gelfond; Location Casting: Meagan Lewis
2017 (32nd)	Café Society	Juliet Taylor and Patricia DiCerto; Associate: Meghan Rafferty
2017 (32nd)	The Edge of Seventeen	Melissa Kostenbauder; Location Casting: Coreen Mayrs and Heike Brandstatter
2018 (33rd)
2018 (33rd)	Lady Bird	Jordan Thaler and Heidi Griffiths
2018 (33rd)	Battle of the Sexes	Justine Arteta and Kim Davis-Wagner
2018 (33rd)	The Disaster Artist	Rich Delia
2018 (33rd)	Get Out	Terri Taylor; Location Casting: Elizabeth Coulon; Associate: Sarah Domeier
2018 (33rd)	Girls Trip	Mary Vernieu and Michelle Wade Byrd; Location Casting: Elizabeth Coulon
2018 (33rd)	I, Tonya	Mary Vernieu and Lindsay Graham; Location Casting: Tara Feldstein Bennett and Chase Paris
2019 (34th)
2019 (34th)	Crazy Rich Asians	Terri Taylor; Associate: Sarah Domeier
2019 (34th)	Book Club	Kerry Barden, Paul Schnee and Avy Kaufman; Associate: Roya Semnanian and Joey Montenarello
2019 (34th)	Love, Simon	Denise Chamian; Location Casting: Tara Feldstein Bennett and Chase Paris
2019 (34th)	Private Life	Jeanne McCarthy and Rori Bergman; Associate: Karlee Fomalont
2019 (34th)	Sorry to Bother You	Eyde Belasco; Location Casting: Nina Henninger; Location Associate: Sarah Kliban

=== 2020s ===
Year	Film	Casting Director(s)
2020 (35th)
2020 (35th)	Jojo Rabbit	Des Hamilton
2020 (35th)	Brittany Runs a Marathon	Laura Rosenthal, Maribeth Fox
2020 (35th)	The Dead Don't Die (2019 film)	Ellen Lewis; Associate: Kate Sprance
2020 (35th)	The Farewell	Leslie Woo
2020 (35th)	Late Night	Laura Rosenthal, Maribeth Fox; Associate: Kimberly Ostroy
2020 (35th)	Poms	Mary Vernieu, Marisol Roncali; Location Casting: Meagan Lewis
2021 (36th)
2021 (36th)	The Forty-Year-Old Version	Jessica Daniels
2021 (36th)	Ammonite	Fiona Weir
2021 (36th)	French Exit	Nicole Arbusto; Location Casting: Lucie Robitaille
2021 (36th)	Happiest Season	Rich Delia; Location Casting: Donna Belajac; Associate: Adam Richards and Missy Finnell
2021 (36th)	Let Them All Talk	Carmen Cuba
2021 (36th)	The Personal History of David Copperfield	Sarah Crowe
2022 (37th)
2022 (37th)	The Tender Bar (tie)	Rachel Tenner, Bess Fifer (Location Casting), Carolyn Pickman (Location Casting), Matt Bouldry (Location Casting), Kyle Crand (Location Casting), Rick Messina (Associate)
2022 (37th)	Zola (tie)	Kim Taylor-Coleman
2022 (37th)	Best Sellers	Pam Dixon, Andrea Kenyon and Randi Wells
2022 (37th)	This Game's Called Murder	Meg Morman and Sunday Boling
2023 (38th)
2023 (38th)	Catherine Called Birdy	Nina Gold and Catriona Dickie
2023 (38th)	The Bubble	Victor Jenkins, Gayle Keller and Allison Kirschner (associate casting director)
2023 (38th)	Emergency	Kim Coleman and Tara Feldstein Bennett (location casting), Chase Paris (location casting)
2023 (38th)	I Love My Dad	Eyde Belasco
2023 (38th)	Spoiler Alert	Avy Kaufman
2024 (39th)
2024 (39th)	The Holdovers	Susan Shopmaker, Lisa Lobel (Location Casting), Angela Peri (Location Casting), Melissa Morris (Associate Casting Director)
2024 (39th)	American Fiction	Jennifer Euston and Lisa Lobel (Location Casting), Angela Peri (Location Casting), Melissa Morris (Associate Casting Director)
2024 (39th)	Bottoms	Laura Rosenthal, Maribeth Foxand Meagan Lewis (Location Casting), Kimberly Ostroy (Associate Casting Director)
2024 (39th)	Joy Ride	Rich Delia and Kara Eide (Location Casting), Kris Woznesensky (Location Casting), Adam Richards (Associate Casting Director)
2024 (39th)	Theater Camp	Kristian Charbonier and Bernard Telsey
2025 (40th)
2025 (40th)	My Old Ass	Douglas Aibel; Matthew Glasner (Associate Casting Director)
2025 (40th)	A Different Man	Maribeth Fox; Kimberly Ostroy (Associate Casting Director)
2025 (40th)	Ezra	Kerry Barden and Paul Schnee; Roya Semnanian and Rachel Goldman (Associate Casting Directors)
2025 (40th)	Hit Man	Vicky Boone; Liz Kelley (Associate Casting Director)
2025 (40th)	A Real Pain	Jessica Kelly
2025 (40th)	Thelma	Jamie Ember
2026 (41st)
2026 (41st)	Rental Family	Kei Kawamura
2026 (41st)	Eternity	Tiffany Mak, Chelsea Ellis Bloch and Marisol Roncali
2026 (41st)	Friendship	Melissa Delizia
2026 (41st)	Oh, Hi!	Kate Geller; Ross Shenker (Associate Casting Director)
2026 (41st)	The Wedding Banquet	Jenny Jue; Candice Elzinga (Location Casting Director)
2026 (41st)	Twinless	Jessica Munks; Simon Max Hill (Location Casting Director)
