= Artios Award for Outstanding Achievement in Casting – Big Budget Feature (Comedy) =

Artios Award for Outstanding Achievement in Casting - Big Budget Feature (Comedy)
- Presented by: Casting Society of America
- Formerly called: Outstanding Achievement in Feature Film Casting – Comedy (1986–2007); Outstanding Achievement in Casting for a Studio Feature – Comedy (2008)
- Established: 1986
- Currently held by: Jay Kelly (2026)

The Artios Award for Outstanding Achievement in Casting - Big Budget Feature (Comedy) is an award handed out annually by the Casting Society of America. The award, in its current incarnation, was first awarded in 2010, when the category made the distinction of award comedic films with larger budgets, and studio backing. Previously, since the second awards ceremony in 1986, the category had only held the distinction of Outstanding Achievement in Feature Film Casting – Comedy. The award honors the casting directors of higher-budgeted, in comparison to independently-backed, films that the voting body believes featured the best casting.

== Winners and nominees ==
=== 1980s ===
Outstanding Achievement in Feature Film Casting

Year	Film	Casting Director(s)
1985 (1st)
1985 (1st)	Amadeus	Mary Goldberg
1985 (1st)	The Adventures of Buckaroo Banzai Across the 8th Dimension	Terry Liebling
1985 (1st)	The Natural	Ellen Chenoweth
1985 (1st)	Sixteen Candles	Jackie Burch
1985 (1st)	A Soldier's Story	Reuben Cannon

Outstanding Achievement in Feature Film Casting – Comedy

Year	Film	Casting Director(s)
1986 (2nd)
1986 (2nd)	Prizzi's Honor	Alixe Gordon
1986 (2nd)	After Hours	Mary Colquhoun
1986 (2nd)	Back to the Future	Mike Fenton, Jane Feinberg and Judy Taylor
1986 (2nd)	Desperately Seeking Susan	Risa Bramon and Billy Hopkins
1986 (2nd)	The Purple Rose of Cairo	Juliet Taylor
1987 (3rd)
1987 (3rd)	Hannah and Her Sisters	Juliet Taylor
1987 (3rd)	Down and Out in Beverly Hills	Ellen Chenoweth
1987 (3rd)	Little Shop of Horrors	Margery Simkin
1987 (3rd)	Ruthless People	Ellen Chenoweth
1987 (3rd)	Something Wild	Risa Bramon and Billy Hopkins
1988 (4th)
1988 (4th)	Moonstruck	Howard Feuer
1988 (4th)	Baby Boom	Pam Dixon
1988 (4th)	Broadcast News	Ellen Chenoweth
1988 (4th)	The Princess Bride	Jane Jenkins, Janet Hirshenson
1988 (4th)	Radio Days	Juliet Taylor
1989 (5th)
1989 (5th)	Bagdad Cafe	Al Onorato and Jerold Franks
1989 (5th)	Big	Juliet Taylor, Paula Herold
1989 (5th)	Crossing Delancey	Meg Simon, Fran Kumin
1989 (5th)	Married to the Mob	Howard Feuer
1989 (5th)	Working Girl	Juliet Taylor

=== 1990s ===
Year	Film	Casting Director(s)
1990 (6th)
1990 (6th)	Parenthood	Jane Jenkins and Jane Hirshenson
1990 (6th)	House Party	Eileen Knight
1990 (6th)	The Little Mermaid	Mary V. Buck, Susan Edelman
1990 (6th)	The War of the Roses	David Rubin
1990 (6th)	When Harry Met Sally...	Jane Jenkins, Janet Hirshenson
1991 (7th)
1991 (7th)	Home Alone	Jane Jenkins and Jane Hirshenson
1991 (7th)	Alice	Juliet Taylor
1991 (7th)	Dick Tracy	Jackie Burch
1991 (7th)	The Freshman	Mike Fenton, Judy Taylor, Lynda Gordon
1991 (7th)	Postcards from the Edge	Juliet Taylor
1992 (8th)
1992 (8th)	The Fisher King	Howard Feurer
1992 (8th)	The Addams Family	David Rubin
1992 (8th)	City Slickers	Pam Dixon
1992 (8th)	Sister Act	Judy Taylor, Lynda Gordon, Geoffrey Johnson, Vincent Liff, Andrew Zerman
1992 (8th)	This Is My Life	Juliet Taylor
1993 (9th)
1993 (9th)	A League of Their Own	Ellen Lewis and Amanda Mackey
1993 (9th)	Honeymoon in Vegas	Mike Fenton
1993 (9th)	Husbands and Wives	Juliet Taylor
1993 (9th)	Mr. Saturday Night	Pam Dixon
1993 (9th)	Used People	Mary Colquhoun
1994 (10th)
1994 (10th)	Sleepless in Seattle	Juliet Taylor
1994 (10th)	Angie	Juliet Taylor
1994 (10th)	Cool Runnings	Chemin Sylvia Bernard
1994 (10th)	Mrs. Doubtfire	Janet Hirshenson, Jane Jenkins
1994 (10th)	The Hudsucker Proxy	Donna Isaacson, John Lyons
1994 (10th)	The Ref	Howard Feuer
1995 (11th)
1995 (11th)	Bullets Over Broadway	Juliet Taylor
1995 (11th)	The Brady Bunch Movie	Deborah Aquila, Jane Shannon
1995 (11th)	The Mask	Fern Champion, Mark Paladini
1995 (11th)	Miami Rhapsody	Renee Rousselot
1995 (11th)	While You Were Sleeping	Amanda Mackey, Cathy Sandrich
1996 (12th)
1996 (12th)	Fargo	John Lyons
1996 (12th)	The Birdcage	Juliet Taylor, Ellen Lewis
1996 (12th)	Flirting with Disaster	Ellen Parks, Risa Bramon
1996 (12th)	Get Shorty	David Rubin, Debra Zane
1996 (12th)	Mighty Aphrodite	Juliet Taylor
1996 (12th)	To Die For	Howard Feurer
1997 (13th)
1997 (13th)	That Thing You Do!	John Lyons
1997 (13th)	Everyone Says I Love You	Juliet Taylor
1997 (13th)	The First Wives Club	Ilene Starger
1997 (13th)	Grosse Pointe Blank	Junie Lowry Johnson
1997 (13th)	Walking and Talking	Avy Kaufman
1998 (14th)
1998 (14th)	Boogie Nights	Christine Sheaks
1998 (14th)	As Good as It Gets	Francine Maisler
1998 (14th)	In & Out	Margery Simkin
1998 (14th)	My Best Friend's Wedding	David Rubin
1998 (14th)	The Opposite of Sex	Amanda Mackey, Cathy Sandrich
1998 (14th)	Wag The Dog	Ellen Chenoweth, Debra Zane
1999 (15th)
1999 (15th)	Election	Lisa Beach
1999 (15th)	10 Things I Hate About You	Marcia Ross and Donna Morong
1999 (15th)	Celebrity	Juliet Taylor
1999 (15th)	Pushing Tin	Ellen Chenoweth
1999 (15th)	The Parent Trap	Ilene Starger

=== 2000s ===
Year	Film	Casting Director(s)
2000 (16th)
2000 (16th)	American Pie	Joseph Middleton and Michelle Morris Gertz
2000 (16th)	Bowfinger	Margery Simkin
2000 (16th)	Galaxy Quest	Debra Zane
2000 (16th)	Keeping the Faith	Avy Kaufman
2000 (16th)	Man on the Moon	Francine Maisler
2001 (17th)
2001 (17th)	State and Main	Avy Kaufman
2001 (17th)	Bring It On	Margery Simkin
2001 (17th)	The Family Man	Matthew Barry, Nancy Green-Keyes
2001 (17th)	A Knight's Tale	Francine Maisler
2001 (17th)	What Women Want	Deborah Aquila, Howard Feuer
2002 (18th)
2002 (18th)	Harry Potter and the Philosopher's Stone	Janet Hirshenson and Jane Jenkins
2002 (18th)	Legally Blonde	Joseph Middleton, Michelle Morris Gertz
2002 (18th)	Ocean’s Eleven	Debra Zane
2002 (18th)	The Princess Diaries	Marcia Ross, Donna Morong, Gail Goldberg
2002 (18th)	Spider-Man	Francine Maisler, Lynn Kressel
2003 (19th)
2003 (19th)	About Schmidt	Lisa Beach, Sarah Katzman, John Jackson (Location Casting)
2003 (19th)	Barbershop	Felicia Fasano, Mary Vernieu
2003 (19th)	Chasing Papi	Chemin Sylvia Bernard
2003 (19th)	Holes	Amanda Mackey Johnson, Cathy Sandrich Gelfond
2003 (19th)	Old School	Joseph Middleton
2004 (20th)
2004 (20th)	School of Rock	Ilene Starger
2004 (20th)	Along Came Polly	Kathleen Chopin
2004 (20th)	Bad Santa	Mary Vernieu, Felicia Fasano
2004 (20th)	Pirates of the Caribbean: The Curse of the Black Pearl	Ronna Kress
2004 (20th)	Something’s Gotta Give	Jane Jenkins, Janet Hirshenson
2005 (21st)
2005 (21st)	Sideways	John Jackson and Ellen Parks
2005 (21st)	The Hitchhiker’s Guide to the Galaxy	Marcia Ross
2005 (21st)	In Good Company	Joseph Middleton
2005 (21st)	Meet the Fockers	Francine Maisler
2005 (21st)	Shall We Dance?	Richard Hicks
2006 (22nd)
2006 (22nd)	Wedding Crashers	Lisa Beach & Sarah Katzman
2006 (22nd)	The Family Stone	Mindy Marin
2006 (22nd)	Mr. & Mrs. Smith	Joseph Middleton, Michelle Morris Gertz
2006 (22nd)	A Prairie Home Companion	Francine Maisler
2006 (22nd)	Thank You for Smoking	Mindy Marin
2007 (23rd)
2007 (23rd)	Night at the Museum	Ilene Starger, Coreen Mayrs, Heike Brandstatter (Vancouver Casting)
2007 (23rd)	Blades of Glory	Juel Bestrop, Seth Yanklewitz
2007 (23rd)	Click	Roger Mussenden
2007 (23rd)	Music and Lyrics	Ilene Starger
2007 (23rd)	Pirates of the Caribbean: Dead Man's Chest	Denise Chamian

Outstanding Achievement in Casting for a Studio Feature – Comedy

Year	Film	Casting Director(s)
2008 (24th)
2008 (24th)	Juno	Mindy Marin, Coreen Mayrs (Location Casting), Heike Brandstatter (Location Casting)
2008 (24th)	27 Dresses	Cathy Sandrich Gelfond, Amanda Mackey
2008 (24th)	Dan in Real Life	Bernard Telsey
2008 (24th)	Enchanted	John Papsidera, Marcia Ross, Susan Shopmaker (Location Casting)
2008 (24th)	Hairspray	David Rubin, Richard Hicks

Outstanding Achievement in Casting - Big Budget Feature Casting (Comedy)

Year	Film	Casting Director(s)
2009 (25th)
2009 (25th)	Tropic Thunder	Francine Maisler
2009 (25th)	Burn After Reading	Ellen Chenoweth
2009 (25th)	Confessions of a Shopaholic	Bernard Telsey
2009 (25th)	Get Smart	Roger Mussenden
2009 (25th)	Yes Man	David Rubin, Richard Hicks

=== 2010s ===
Year	Film	Casting Director(s)
2010 (26th)
2010 (26th)	Julie & Julia	Francine Maisler
2010 (26th)	Couples Retreat	Sarah Halley Finn, Randi Hiller
2010 (26th)	Date Night	Donna Isaacson
2010 (26th)	The Proposal	Amanda Mackey Johnson, Cathy Sandrich Gelfond, Angela Peri (Location Casting)
2010 (26th)	Valentine’s Day	Deborah Aquila, Tricia Wood
2011 (27th)
2011 (27th)	Red	Deborah Aquila, Tricia Wood, Craig Fincannon (Location Casting), Lisa Mae Fincannon (Location Casting), Robin D. Cook (Location Casting)
2011 (27th)	How Do You Know	Francine Maisler, Lynn Kressel (Location Casting)
2011 (27th)	Morning Glory	Ellen Lewis
2011 (27th)	Pirates of the Caribbean: On Stranger Tides	Francine Maisler, Lucy Bevan
2011 (27th)	Scott Pilgrim vs. the World	Jennifer Euston, Robin D. Cook
2012 (28th)
2012 (28th)	Crazy, Stupid, Love	Mindy Marin, Kara Lipson (Associate)
2012 (28th)	21 Jump Street	Jeanne McCarthy, Nicole Abellera, Elizabeth Coulon (Location Casting), Yesi Ramirez (Associate)
2012 (28th)	Horrible Bosses	Lisa Beach, Sarah Katzman
2012 (28th)	The Muppets	Marcia Ross, Gail Goldberg, Brittainy Roberts (Associate)
2012 (28th)	The Rum Diary	Denise Chamian, Angela Demo (Associate)
2013 (29th)
2013 (29th)	Silver Linings Playbook	Mary Vernieu and Lindsay Graham; Diane Heery, Jason Loftus (Location Casting)
2013 (29th)	Oz the Great and Powerful	John Papsidera
2013 (29th)	Pain & Gain	Denise Chamian, Lori Wyman (Location Casting), Ania Kamieniecki-O’Hare (Associate)
2013 (29th)	Ted	Sheila Jaffe, Angela Peri (Location Casting)
2013 (29th)	The Watch	Alyssa Weisberg, Shay Bentley Griffin (Location Casting); Yesi Ramirez, Karina Walters (Associates)
2015 (30th)
2015 (30th)	The Wolf of Wall Street	Ellen Lewis
2015 (30th)	Guardians of the Galaxy	Sarah Finn, Reg Poerscout-Edgerton, Tamara Hunter (Associate)
2015 (30th)	Into the Woods	Francine Maisler, Bernard Telsey, Tiffany Little Canfield
2015 (30th)	The Secret Life of Walter Mitty	Rachel Tenner; Charlene Lee, Bess Fifer (Associates)
2015 (30th)	This Is Where I Leave You	Cindy Tolan, Adam Caldwell (Associate)
2015 (30th)	We're the Millers	Lisa Beach, Sarah Katzman, Lisa Mae Fincannon (Location Casting); Jeremy Gordon, Beth Lipari, Dana Salerno (Associates)
2016 (31st)
2016 (31st)	The Big Short	Francine Maisler, Meagan Lewis (Location Casting)
2016 (31st)	The Intern	Bernard Telsey, Laray Mayfield, Tiffany Little Canfield, David Vaccari (Associate)
2016 (31st)	Joy	Mary Vernieu, Lindsay Graham, Angela Peri (Location Casting)
2016 (31st)	Sisters	Kerry Barden, Paul Schnee; Joey Montenarello, Adam Richards (Associates)
2016 (31st)	Tomorrowland	April Webster, Alyssa Weisberg; Corinne Clark, Jennifer Page (Location Casting)
2017 (32nd)
2017 (32nd)	La La Land	Deborah Aquila and Tricia Wood
2017 (32nd)	Deadpool	Ronna Kress; Jennifer Page, Corinne Clark (Location Casting)
2017 (32nd)	Hail, Caesar!	Ellen Chenoweth, Susanne Scheel (Associate)
2017 (32nd)	Rules Don't Apply	David Rubin, Melissa Pryor (Associate)
2017 (32nd)	Whiskey Tango Foxtrot	Bernard Telsey, Tiffany Little Canfield, Jo Edna Boldin (Location Casting); Conrad Woolfe, Marie A.K. McMaster (Associates)
2018 (33rd)
2018 (33rd)	The Greatest Showman	Bernard Telsey, Tiffany Little Canfield, Rori Bergman (Additional Casting), Patrick Goodwin (Associate)
2018 (33rd)	Beauty and the Beast	Lucy Bevan; Bernard Telsey, Tiffany Little Canfield (Location Casting)
2018 (33rd)	Guardians of the Galaxy Vol. 2	Sarah Halley Finn; Tara Feldstein Bennett, Chase Paris (Location Casting)
2018 (33rd)	Logan Lucky	Carmen Cuba; Tara Feldstein Bennett, Chase Paris (Location Casting); Charley Medigovich (Associate)
2018 (33rd)	Wonder	Deborah Aquila, Tricia Wood; Kara Eide, Kris Woz (Location Casting)
2019 (34th)
2019 (34th)	Green Book	Rick Montgomery, Meagan Lewis (Location Casting), Thomas Sullivan (Associate)
2019 (34th)	The Ballad of Buster Scruggs	Ellen Chenoweth, Jo Edna Boldin (Location Casting), Susanne Scheel (Associate), Marie A.K. McMaster (Location Associate)
2019 (34th)	Deadpool 2	Mary Vernieu, Marisol Roncali; Corinne Clark, Nina Henninger, Jennifer Page, Yumi Takada (Location Casting); Raylin Sabo (Associate)
2019 (34th)	Game Night	Rich Delia; Tara Feldstein Bennett, Chase Paris (Location Casting); Adam Richards (Associate)
2019 (34th)	Mary Poppins Returns	Bernard Telsey, Tiffany Little Canfield, Conrad Woolfe (Associate), Sarah Trevis (UK Associate)

=== 2020s ===
Year	Film	Casting Director(s)
2020 (35th)
2020 (35th)	Knives Out	Mary Vernieu; Location Casting: Angela Peri; Associate: Brett Howe
2020 (35th)	Dolemite Is My Name	Mary Vernieu and Lindsay Graham Ahanonu
2020 (35th)	Hustlers	Gayle Keller
2020 (35th)	Rocketman	Reginald Poerscot-Edgerton
2020 (35th)	Uncut Gems	Francine Maisler
2021 (36th)
2021 (36th)	Borat Subsequent Moviefilm	Nancy Bishop
2021 (36th)	Enola Holmes	Jina Jay
2021 (36th)	The King of Staten Island	Gayle Keller and David Rubin; Associate: Allison Kirschner
2021 (36th)	The Prom	Alexa L. Fogel; Associate: Kathryn Zamora-Benson and Alison Goodman
2021 (36th)	On the Rocks	Courtney Bright and Nicole Daniels
2022 (37th)
2022 (37th)	Don't Look Up	Francine Maisler, Kathy Driscoll-Mohler (Additional Casting), Carolyn Pickman (Location Casting), Matt Bouldry (Location Casting), Kyle Crand (Location Casting), Molly Rose (Associate)
2022 (37th)	Cruella	Mary Vernieu, Lucy Bevan and Bret Howe (Associate), Emily Brockmann (Associate), Olivia Grant (Associate)
2022 (37th)	The French Dispatch	Douglas Aibel, Matthew Glasner (Associate)
2022 (37th)	In the Heights	Bernard Telsey, Tiffany Little Canfield, Kristian Charbonier (Associate)
2022 (37th)	Shang-Chi and the Legend of the Ten Rings	Sarah Halley Finn, Amanda Mitchell (Location Casting), Poping Auyeung (Location Casting), Molly Doyle (Associate)
2023 (38th)
2023 (38th)	Matilda the Musical	Lucy Bevan and Emily Brockmann
2023 (38th)	Bros	Gayle Keller, Allison Kirschner (associate casting director)
2023 (38th)	Glass Onion: A Knives Out Mystery	Mary Vernieu and Bret Howe
2023 (38th)	The Menu	Mary Vernieu, Bret Howe, Lisa Mae Fincannon (location casting), Kimberly Wistedt (location casting), Becca Burgess (associate casting director)
2023 (38th)	White Noise	Douglas Aibel, D. Lynn Meyers, (location casting), Matthew Glasner (associate casting director
2024 (39th)
2024 (39th)	Are You There God? It's Me, Margaret.	Francine Maisler, Melissa Kostenbauder, Betsy Fippinger (Location Casting), Tara Feldstein (Location Casting), Chase Paris (Location Casting), Molly Rose (Associate Casting Director)
2024 (39th)	Air	Mary Vernieu, Lindsay Graham Ahanonu, Sydney Shircliff (Associate Casting Director)
2024 (39th)	Asteroid City	Douglas Aibel, Jina Jay (Location Casting), Matthew Glasner (Associate Casting Director)
2024 (39th)	Cocaine Bear	Debra Zane, Dylan Jury, Ali Coffey (Location Casting)
2024 (39th)	Wonka	Nina Gold
2025 (40th)
2025 (40th)	Wicked	Bernard Telsey, Tiffany Little Canfield; Ryan Bernard Tymensky (Associate Casting Director); Tamsyn Manson (Location Casting Director)
2025 (40th)	Beetlejuice Beetlejuice	Sophie Holland; Angela Peri, Lisa Lobel (Location Casting Directors); Melissa Morris (Location Associate Casting Director)
2025 (40th)	Challengers	Francine Maisler; Molly Rose (Associate Casting Director)
2025 (40th)	Deadpool & Wolverine	Sarah Halley Finn; Jacqueline Gallagher, Jordyn Gregory (Associate Casting Directors); Lucy Bevan, Emily Brockmann (Location Casting Directors); Katie Brydon (Location Associate Casting Director)
2025 (40th)	Nightbitch	Douglas Aibel; Matthew Glasner (Associate Casting Director)
2025 (40th)	Saturday Night	John Papsidera
2026 (41st)
2026 (41st)	Jay Kelly	Douglas Aibel and Nina Gold; Matthew Glasner (Associate Casting Director); Francesco Vedovati and Barbara Giordani (Location Casting Directors)
2026 (41st)	Materialists	Douglas Aibel; Matthew Glasner (Associate Casting Director)
2026 (41st)	The Naked Gun	Carmen Cuba; Judith Sunga (Associate Casting Director); Tara Feldstein Bennett and Chase Paris (Location Casting Directors)
2026 (41st)	The Phoenician Scheme	Douglas Aibel (US Casting); Jina Jay (UK Casting); Alexandra Montag (German Casting); Matthew Glasner (Associate Casting Director)
2026 (41st)	Wake Up Dead Man	Mary Vernieu and Bret Howe; Martin Ware (Location Casting Director); Olivia Brittain (Location Associate Casting Director)
2026 (41st)	Wicked: For Good	Bernard Telsey and Tiffany Little Canfield; Ryan Bernard Tymensky (Associate Casting Director); Tamsyn Manson (Location Casting Director)
