= 38th Artios Awards =

US film awards

- Date: March 9, 2023
- Site: The Beverly Hilton; The Edison Ballroom
- Country: United States
- Presented by: Casting Society of America
- Hosted by: Yvette Nicole Brown; Amber Ruffin
- Website: www.castingsociety.com/awards/artios

The 38th Artios Awards, presented by the Casting Society of America, honoring the best originality, creativity and contribution of casting professionals to the overall quality of a film, television series, short form project and theatre production, were held on March 9, 2023, simultaneously at The Beverly Hilton in Los Angeles and Edison Ballroom in New York, being the first time in two years that the ceremony was an in-person event.

The nominations for the television, short form project, and theatre categories were announced on October 17, 2022. The nominees for the film categories were announced on January 10, 2023. Yvette Nicole Brown and Amber Ruffin both hosted the event simultaneously. The latter hosted in New York while the former hosted in Los Angeles; Brown previously hosted the first virtual awards ceremony in 2021 and was on hand to host the organization's first in-person gala in two years. Simone Bär posthumously received the European Capelier-Shaw Award for Excellence in Casting.

== Winners and nominees ==
=== Film ===
Big Budget – Comedy: Matilda the Musical – Lucy Bevan, Emily Brockmann; Bros – Gayle Keller, Allison Kirschner (associate casting director); Glass Onion: A Knives Out Mystery – Mary Vernieu, Bret Howe; The Menu – Mary Vernieu, Bret Howe, Lisa Mae Fincannon (location casting), Kimberly Wistedt (location casting), Becca Burgess (associate casting director); White Noise – Douglas Aibel, D. Lynn Meyers, (location casting), Matthew Glasner (associate casting director)	Big Budget – Drama: The Fabelmans – Cindy Tolan, Nicholas Petrovich (associate casting director); Black Panther: Wakanda Forever – Sarah Halley Finn, Carla Hool (location casting), Tara Feldstein Bennett (location casting), Chase Paris (location casting), Molly Doyle (associate casting director); Elvis – Denise Chamian, Nikki Barrett, Beth Day (associate casting director) Liz Ludwitzke (associate casting director); Tár – Avy Kaufman, Simone Bär (location casting), Jeremy Zimmerman (location casting); Till – Kim Coleman, Tara Feldstein Bennett (location casting), Chase Paris (location casting), Stefni Colle (associate casting director)
Studio or Independent – Comedy: Catherine Called Birdy – Nina Gold, Catriona Dickie; The Bubble – Victor Jenkins, Gayle Keller, Allison Kirschner (associate casting director); Emergency – Kim Coleman, Tara Feldstein Bennett (location casting), Chase Paris (location casting); I Love My Dad – Eyde Belasco; Spoiler Alert – Avy Kaufman	Studio or Independent – Drama: The Banshees of Inisherin – Louise Kiely; Armageddon Time – Douglas Aibel, Matthew Glasner (associate casting director); Causeway – Ellen Chenoweth, Tracy Kilpatrick (location casting), Susanne Scheel (associate casting director), Blair Foster (associate casting director); Cha Cha Real Smooth – Angela Demo, Nancy Mosser Bailey (location casting); The Whale – Mary Vernieu, Lindsay Graham Ahanonu, Bret Howe (associate casting director)
Low Budget – Comedy or Drama: Emily the Criminal – Chelsea Bloch, Marisol Roncali; Family Squares – Sharon Bialy, Sherry Thomas; Montana Story – Avy Kaufman, Harrison Nesbit (associate casting director); Please Baby Please – Eyde Belasco; The Swearing Jar – Nicole Hilliard-Forde, Matthew Lessall	Micro Budget – Comedy or Drama: The Same Storm – Bernard Telsey, Tiffany Little Canfield, Adam Caldwell, Karyn Casl (associate casting director); The Cathedral – Ally Beans, Daryl Eisenberg; Down with the King – Scotty Anderson, Harrison Nesbit; Four Samosas – Emiiy Schweber; They/Them/Us – Joey Montenarello, Duncan Stewart, Benton Whitley, D. Lynn Meyers (location casting)
Animation: Marcel the Shell with Shoes On – Jessica Kelly, Kate Geller (associate casting director); The Bad Guys – Christi Soper Hilt; Lightyear – Natalie Lyon, Kevin Reher, Kate Hansen-Birnbaum (associate casting director); Puss in Boots: The Last Wish – Christi Soper Hilt; Turning Red – Natalie Lyon, Kevin Reher, Kate Hansen-Birnbaum (associate casting director)	Non-Theatrical Release: The Harder They Fall – Victoria Thomas, Jo Edna Boldin (location casting); The Adam Project – Carmen Cuba, Tiffany Mak (location casting), Judith Sunga (associate casting director); Better Nate Than Ever – Bernard Telsey, Bethany Knox, Pat Goodwin; Deep Water – Ellen Chenoweth, Tracy Kilpatrick (location casting), Susanne Scheel (associate casting director); The Survivor – Ellen Chenoweth, Susanne Scheel (associate casting director)
The Zeitgeist Award: Everything Everywhere All at Once – Sarah Halley Finn, Djinous Rowling (associate casting director); Avatar: The Way of Water – Margery Simkin, Katrina Wandel George (associate casting director), Jasmine Gutierrez (associate casting director), Sydney Shircliff (associate casting director); The Batman – Cindy Tolan, Lucy Bevan, Nicholas Petrovich (associate casting director), Olivia Grant (associate casting director); Scream – Rich Delia, Lisa Mae Fincannon (location casting), Craig Fincannon (location casting), Adam Richards (associate casting director), Meredith Petty Hughes; Top Gun: Maverick – Denise Chamian, Jordana Sapiurka (associate casting director)

=== Television ===
Television Series – Comedy: Hacks – Jeanne McCarthy, Nicole Abellera Hallman, Anna Mayworm (associate casting director); Barry – Sherry Thomas, Sharon Bialy, Stacia Kimler (associate casting director); The Marvelous Mrs. Maisel – Cindy Tolan, Anne Davison (associate casting director); The Other Two – Allison Estrin, Henry Russell Bergstein, Jenn Gaw (associate casting director), Dayna Katz (associate casting director); Ted Lasso – Theo Park	Television Series – Drama: Succession – Avy Kaufman, Lilia Trapani (location casting), Harrison Nesbit (associate casting director); Better Call Saul – Sharon Bialy, Sherry Thomas, Russell Scott, Marie K. McMaster (location casting), Alyssa Morris (associate casting director); Euphoria – Jessica Kelly, Mary Vernieu, Bret Howe, Jennifer Venditti (location casting); The Morning Show – Victoria Thomas; Ozark – Alexa L. Fogel, Chase Paris (location casting), Tara Feldstein Bennett (location casting), Kathryn Zamora-Benson (associate casting director)
Television Pilot and First Season – Comedy: Abbott Elementary – Wendy O'Brien; Ghosts – Elizabeth Barnes, Tannis Vallely, Andrea Kenyon (location casting), Randi Wells (location casting); Julia – Sharon Bialy, Gohar Gazazyan, Lisa Lobel (location casting), Angela Peri (location casting), Stacia Kimler (associate casting director), Melissa Morris (associate casting director); Only Murders in the Building – Bernard Telsey, Tiffany Little Canfield, Destiny Lilly (associate casting director); Reservation Dogs – Angelique Midthunder, Jennifer Schwalenberg, Chris Freihofer (location casting), Stacey Rice (associate casting director), Lisa Zambetti (associate casting director); The Sex Lives of College Girls – Elizabeth Barnes, Jennifer Euston	Television Pilot and First Season – Drama: Yellowjackets – Junie Lowry Johnson, Libby Goldstein, Corinne Clark (location casting), Jennifer Page (location casting), Josh Ropiequet (associate casting director); The Gilded Age – Bernard Telsey, Adam Caldwell, Kristian Charbonier (associate casting director); Kevin Can F**k Himself – Felicia Fasano, Rikki Gimelstob, Angela Peri (location casting), Lisa Lobel (location casting), Katie Lantz (associate casting director); Pachinko – Mary Vernieu, Michelle Wade Byrd, Ko Iwagami (location casting), Corinne Clark (location casting), Jennifer Page (location casting); Severance – Rachel Tenner, Bess Fifer (location casting), Rick Messina (associate casting director); Winning Time: The Rise of the Lakers Dynasty – Francine Maisler, Kathy Driscoll-Mohler, Melissa Kostenbauder, Molly Rose (associate casting director)
Limited Series: Dopesick – Avy Kaufman, Erica Arvold (location casting), Scotty Anderson (associate casting director), Dustin Presley (associate casting director); The Dropout – Jeanie Bacharach, Alison Goodman, Mark Rutman; Inventing Anna – Linda Lowy, Henry Russell Bergstein, Allison Estrin, Jamie Castro, Simone Bär (location casting), Juliette Menager (location casting), Dayna Katz (associate casting director); Maid – Rachel Tenner, Corinne Clark (location casting), Jennifer Page (location casting), Rick Messina (associate casting director); The Staircase – Douglas Aibel, Tracy Kilpatrick (location casting), Matthew Glasner (associate casting director), Blair Foster (associate casting director)	Film, Non-Theatrical Release: The Harder They Fall – Victoria Thomas, Jo Edna Boldin (location casting); The Adam Project – Carmen Cuba, Tiffany Mak (location casting), Judith Sunga (associate casting director); Better Nate Than Ever – Bernard Telsey, Bethany Knox, Pat Goodwin; Deep Water – Ellen Chenoweth, Tracy Kilpatrick (location casting), Susanne Scheel (associate casting director); Turning Red – Kevin Reher, Natalie Lyon, Kate Hansen-Birnbaum (associate casting director)
Animated Series: Big Mouth – Julie Ashton; Bob's Burgers – Julie Ashton; Central Park – Julie Ashton; Family Guy – Christine Terry, Jackie Sollitto; Rick and Morty – Ruth Lambert, Robert McGee	Reality Series: RuPaul's Drag Race – Goloka Bolte, Ethan Petersen; Nailed It! – Ron Mare, Anna Sturgeon; Queer Eye – Jessica Jorgensen, Danielle Gervais, Quinn Fegan, Natalie Pino, Pamela Vallarelli; Shark Tank – Mindy Zemrak; Top Chef – Ron Mare, Heather Allyn
Live Television Performance, Variety, or Sketch – Comedy, Drama, or Musical: Annie Live! – Bernard Telsey, Patrick Goodwin; That Damn Michael Che – Erica A. Hart; The G Word with Adam Conover – Lindsey Weissmueller, Chrissy Fiorilli-Ellington; True Story with Ed and Randall – Melissa DeLizia; Would I Lie to You? – Mark Saks	Children's Pilot and Series (Live Action): The Baby-Sitters Club – Danielle Aufiero, Amber Horn, Tiffany Mak (location casting), Leigh Ann Smith (associate casting director); Bunk'd – Howard Meltzer, Biz Urban (associate casting director); Noggin Knows – Danielle Pretsfelder Demchick; Warped! – Nickole Doro, Shayna Sherwood, Devon Brady (associate casting director), Jeremy Gordon (associate casting director); Young Dylan – Kim Coleman, Rhavynn Drummer (associate casting director)

=== Short Form Projects ===
Short Film: The F Word – Rachel Reiss; El Carrito – Emily Fleischer; Milk – Shakyra Dowling; North Star – Jeffrey Gafner; We're Too Good for This – Shakyra Dowling	Short Form Series: State of the Union – Kathleen Chopin, John Ort; Breakwater – Jeffrey Gafner; Love, Death + Robots – Ivy Isenberg, Natasha Vincent (location casting)

=== Theatre ===
New York Broadway Theatre – Comedy or Drama: Take Me Out – Jim Carnahan, Jason Thinger (associate casting director); Chicken & Biscuits – Erica A. Hart; Clyde's – Will Cantler, Karyn Casl, Destiny Lilly, Charlie Hano (associate casting director); For Colored Girls Who Have Considered Suicide / When the Rainbow Is Enuf – Erica Jensen, Heidi Griffiths, Kate Murray; POTUS: Or, Behind Every Great Dumbass Are Seven Women Trying to Keep Him Alive – Taylor Williams	New York Broadway Theatre – Musical: Company – Cindy Tolan, Nicholas Petrovich; Caroline, or Change – Jim Carnahan, Jilian Cimini, Carrie Gardner, Stephen Kopel; Girl from the North Country – Jordan Thaler, Heidi Griffiths; MJ the Musical – Rachel Hoffman; The Music Man – Craig Burns, Bernard Telsey, Rebecca Scholl
New York Theatre – Comedy or Drama: Fairycakes – Adam Caldwell, Destiny Lilly, Charlie Hano (associate casting director) (TIE); Wish You Were Here – Karyn Casl (TIE); A Case for the Existence of God – David Caparelliotis; The Daughter-in-Law – Stephanie Klapper; Letters of Suresh – Karyn Casl, Destiny Lilly, Charlie Hano (associate casting director); Prayer for the French Republic – Kelly Gillespie; Which Way to the Stage – Will Cantler	New York Theatre – Musical: Trevor – Tara Rubin, Merri Sugarman; ¡Americano! – Michael Cassara; The Bedwetter – Rachel Hoffman, Charlie Hano (associate casting director); Black No More – Kristian Charbonier, Rebecca Scholl; Oratorio for Living Things – Henry Russell Bergstein; Whisper House – Tara Rubin, Peter Van Dam
Los Angeles Theatre: A Christmas Carol – Jim Carnahan, Jilian Cimini, Jason Thinger (associate casting director); God of Carnage – Michael Donovan, Richie Ferris; Head over Heels – Ryan Bernard Tymensky; Man of God – Phyllis Schuringa; Power of Sail – Phyllis Schuringa	Regional Theatre: School Girls; Or, The African Mean Girls Play – Lauren Port, Rachael Jimenez (associate casting director); Bhangin' It: A Bangin' New Musical – Erica Jensen, Paul Davis; Bob Fosse's Dancin' – Tara Rubin, Xavier Rubiano (associate casting director); Bug – JC Clementz; A Christmas Carol – Jim Carnahan, Jason Thinger (associate casting director)
Special Theatrical Performance: The Life – Destiny Lilly, Charlie Hano (associate casting director); Candide – Stephanie Klapper; Kismet – Peter Van Dam; The Tap Dance Kid – Craig Burns	Theatre Tours: Six the Musical – Tara Rubin, Peter Van Dam, Kevin Metzger-Timson (associate casting director); Hadestown – Duncan Stewart, Benton Whitley; Moulin Rouge! – Jim Carnahan, Stephen Kopel, Alexandre Bleau (associate casting director); Oklahoma! – Taylor Williams; To Kill a Mockingbird – Adam Caldwell, Destiny Lilly, Amelia McCarthy (associate casting director)

== Special Honorees ==
- Creative Collaboration Award – United Agents
- Rosalie Joseph Humanitarian Award – Jessica Sherman
- Lynn Stalmaster Award for Career Achievement – Rita Moreno
- Hoyt Bowers Award for Excellence in Casting – Leslee Feldman
- Marion Dougherty New York Apple Award – Black Theatre United
- European Capelier-Shaw Award for Excellence in Casting – Simone Bär (posthumous)

== Associated Casting Director / Unscripted Casting Producer Spotlight Awards ==
- Martin Ware (London)
- Jenn Noyes (New York)
- Joy Gordo (Los Angeles)
