= 36th Artios Awards =

Annual US film and television award

- Date: April 15, 2021
- Country: United States
- Presented by: Casting Society of America
- Hosted by: Yvette Nicole Brown
- Website: www.castingsociety.com/awards/artios

The 36th Artios Awards, presented by the Casting Society of America, honored the best originality, creativity and the contribution of casting to the overall quality of a film, television, theatre and short-form projects. The ceremony was held on April 15, 2021, virtually.

The television, theater, short film and short-form nominations were announced on January 8, 2021. The film nominations were announced on February 19, 2021.

== Winners and nominees ==
Winners are listed first and highlighted in boldface:

=== Film ===
**Big Budget – Comedy**: **Borat Subsequent Moviefilm – Nancy Bishop**; Enola Holmes – Jina Jay; The King of Staten Island – Gayle Keller, David Rubin; Associate: Allison Kirschner; The Prom – Alexa L. Fogel; Associate: Kathryn Zamora-Benson, Alison Goodman; On the Rocks – Courtney Bright, Nicole Daniels	**Big Budget – Drama**: **The Trial of the Chicago 7 – Francine Maisler; Location Casting: Mia Cusumano, Jennifer Rudnicke, Mickie Pascal; Associate: Kathy Driscoll-Mohler, Molly Rose, AJ Links**; Da 5 Bloods – Kim Coleman; Location Casting: Juliette Menager; Hillbilly Elegy – Carmen Cuba; Location Casting: Tara Feldstein Bennett, Chase Paris, D. Lynn Meyers; Associate: Judith Sunga; Judas and the Black Messiah – Alexa L. Fogel; Location Casting: Donna Belajac; Associate: Elizabeth Berra, Missy Finnell; Mulan – Debra Zane; Chinese Casting Consultant: PoPing AuYeung; Associate: Dylan Jury
**Studio or Independent – Comedy**: **The Forty-Year-Old Version – Jessica Daniels**; Ammonite – Fiona Weir; French Exit – Nicole Arbusto; Location Casting: Lucie Robitaille; Happiest Season – Rich Delia; Location Casting: Donna Belajac; Associate: Adam Richards, Missy Finnell; Let Them All Talk – Carmen Cuba; The Personal History of David Copperfield – Sarah Crowe	**Studio or Independent – Drama**: **One Night in Miami... – Kimberly R. Hardin; Location Casting: Tracy Kilpatrick**; The Dig – Lucy Bevan; Ma Rainey's Black Bottom – Avy Kaufman; Location Casting: Nancy Mosser; Associate: Scotty Anderson; The Mauritanian – Nina Gold; Location Casting: Christa Schamberger; Pieces of a Woman – Jessica Kelly; Promising Young Woman – Mary Vernieu, Lindsay Graham Ahanonu
**Low Budget – Comedy or Drama**: **Minari – Julia Kim; Location Casting: Chris Freihofer**; All Day and a Night – Kim Coleman; Location Casting: Nina Henninger; Associate: Sarah Kliban; The Assistant – Avy Kaufman; Associate: Scotty Anderson; Herself – Louise Kiely; Sound of Metal – Susan Shopmaker; Location Casting: Angela Peri, Lisa Lobel; Associate: Emily Fleischer	**Micro Budget – Comedy or Drama**: **The Surrogate – Erica Hart**; American Skin – Tracy "Twinkie" Byrd, Kelly Knox; Black Bear – Henry Russell Bergstein, Allison Estrin, Jenn Gaw; Inez & Doug & Kira – Kerry Barden, Paul Schnee; Associate: Roya Semnanian, Joey Montenarello; International Falls – Matthew Lessall; Miss Juneteenth – Chelsea Ellis Bloch
**Animation**: **Soul – Kevin Reher, Natalie Lyon; Associate: Kate Hansen-Birnbaum**; The Croods: A New Age – Christi Soper Hilt; Onward – Kevin Reher, Natalie Lyon; Trolls World Tour – Christi Soper Hilt

=== Television ===
**Television Series – Comedy**: **What We Do in the Shadows – Gayle Keller; Location Casting: Jenny Lewis, Sara Kay**; Better Things – Felicia Fasano; Associate: Katie Lantz; Dead to Me – Sherry Thomas, Russell Scott, Sharon Bialy; Associate: Alyssa Morris; Insecure – Victoria Thomas; The Marvelous Mrs. Maisel – Cindy Tolan; Associate: Anne Davison	**Television Series – Drama**: **Succession – Avy Kaufman**; Big Little Lies – David Rubin; Associate: Andrea Bunker; The Handmaid's Tale – Sharon Bialy, Sherry Thomas, Russell Scott; Location Casting: Robin D. Cook; Associate: Stacia Kimler, Jonathan Oliveira; Ozark – Alexa L. Fogel; Location Casting: Chase Paris, Tara Feldstein Bennett; Associate: Kathryn Zamora-Benson; Pose – Alexa L. Fogel; Associate: Elizabeth Berra
**Television Pilot and First Season – Comedy**: **The Great – Rose Wicksteed**; Modern Love – Laura Rosenthal, Maribeth Fox, Jodi Angstreich; Never Have I Ever – Brett Greenstein, Collin Daniel; Associate: Danny Dunitz; The Politician – Alexa L. Fogel; Associate: Kathryn Zamora-Benson, Alison Goodman; Zoey's Extraordinary Playlist – Robert J. Ulrich, Eric Dawson, Carol Kritzer, Alex Newman; Location Casting: Coreen Mayrs, Heike Brandstatter, Erinn Lally, Annalese Tilling	**Television Pilot and First Season – Drama**: **Euphoria – Mary Vernieu, Jessica Kelly, Jennifer Venditti; Associate: Bret Howe**; The Boys – Robert J. Ulrich, Eric Dawson, Carol Kritzer, Alex Newman; Location Casting: Jenny Lewis, Sara Kay; The Mandalorian – Sarah Finn; Associate: Jason Stamey; The Morning Show – Victoria Thomas; The Outsider – Alexa L. Fogel; Location Casting: Chase Paris, Tara Feldstein Bennett; Associate: Kathryn Zamora-Benson
**Limited Series**: **Normal People – Louise Kiely**; Little Fires Everywhere – David Rubin; Mrs. America – Carmen Cuba; Location Casting: Robin D. Cook; Associate: Charley Medigovich, Jonathan Oliveira; Unbelievable – Laura Rosenthal, Jodi Angstreich, Kate Caldwell, Melissa Kostenbauder; Associate: Kim Guzman, Anthony Kraus; Watchmen – Victoria Thomas; Location Casting: Meagan Lewis	**Film, Non-Theatrical Release**: **Bad Education – Ellen Lewis, Kate Sprance**; In the Shadow of the Moon – Ellen Chenoweth; Location Casting: John Buchan, Jason Knight; Associate: Susanne Scheel, Morgyn Johnston; Patsy & Loretta – Susan Edelman; Location Casting: Mark Fincannon; To All the Boys: P.S. I Still Love You – Tamara-Lee Notcutt; Location Casting: Tiffany Mak; Troop Zero – Mary Vernieu, Lindsay Graham; Location Casting: Lisa Mae Fincannon; Associate: Kimberly Wistedt
**Live Television Performance, Variety or Sketch Comedy**: **A Black Lady Sketch Show – Victoria Thomas**; Drunk History – Melissa DeLizia; John Mulaney & the Sack Lunch Bunch – Jim Carnahan, Carrie Gardner, Jillian Cimini; Live in Front of a Studio Audience: "All in the Family" and "Good Times" – Marc Hirschfeld, Geralyn Flood	**Children's Pilot and Series (Live Action)**: **The Baby-Sitters Club – Amber Horn, Danielle Aufiero; Location Casting: Tiffany Mak**; All That – Nickole Doro, Shayna Sherwood; Bunk'd – Howard Meltzer; Associate: Biz Urban; High School Musical: The Musical: The Series – Julie Ashton; Young Dylan – Kim Coleman
**Television Animation**: **Big Mouth – Julie Ashton**; Bob's Burgers – Julie Ashton; Central Park – Julie Ashton; Harley Quinn – Robert McGee, Ruth Lambert; Rick and Morty – Robert McGee, Ruth Lambert	**Reality Series**: **Queer Eye – Danielle Gervais, Beyhan Oguz, Pamela Vallarelli; Location Casting: Ally Capriotti Grant**; Born This Way – Megan Sleeper, Sasha Alpert; Nailed It! – Samantha Hanks, Shannon McCarty, Heather Allyn; RuPaul's Drag Race – Goloka Bolte, Ethan Petersen; Top Chef – Samantha Hanks

=== Short-Form Projects ===
**Short Film**: **Netuser – Stephanie Klapper**; -Ship: A Visual Poem – Kate Geller; Beefcakes – Nicole Arbusto; Cap – Daniel Cabeza; No More Wings – Heather Basten; Shadows – Daryl Eisenberg, Ally Beans	**Short Form Series**: **#FreeRayshawn – Jessica Kelly, Mary Vernieu; Location Casting: Brent Caballero**; Dead Girls Detective Agency – Arlie Day; Girls Room – Jennifer Presser, Caitlin Well; Most Dangerous Game – Mary Vernieu, Raylin Sabo; Location Casting: Stephanie Gorin; The Stranger – Junie Lowry Johnson, Libby Goldstein; Associate: Josh Ropiequet

=== Theatre ===
**New York Broadway Theatre – Musical**: **Tina: the Tina Turner Musical – Patrick Goodwin, Bernard Telsey**; Jagged Little Pill – Stephen Kopel; Moulin Rouge! the Musical – Jim Carnahan, Stephen Kopel	**New York Broadway Theatre – Play**: **Slave Play – Taylor Williams**; Grand Horizons – Will Cantler, Karyn Casl; The Great Society – Daniel Swee; The Inheritance (Parts 1 & 2) – Jordan Thaler, Heidi Griffiths; Associate: Rebecca Feldman; The Sound Inside – Will Cantler, Karyn Casl
**New York Broadway Theatre – Revival, Play**: **A Soldier's Play – Jim Carnahan**; Betrayal – Jim Carnahan, Alexandre Bleau; The Rose Tattoo – Jim Carnahan, Carrie Gardner
**New York Theatre – Musical**: **Little Shop of Horrors – Jim Carnahan**; Bob and Carol and Ted and Alice – Rachel Hoffman; Cyrano – Patrick Goodwin; The Secret Life of Bees – Patrick Goodwin; Sing Street – Tara Rubin, Peter Van Dam	**New York Theatre – Play**: **All the Natalie Portmans – Will Cantler, Destiny Lilly**; Anatomy of a Suicide – Karyn Casl; Dracula – Karyn Casl; Macbeth – Karyn Casl, Destiny Lilly; The Young Man from Atlanta – David Caparelliotis
**Regional Theatre – Musical**: **Six – Tara Rubin, Peter Van Dam**; Fly – Patrick Goodwin; Gun & Powder – Tara Rubin; Associate: Kevin Metzger-Thompson; In the Heights – Chad Eric Murnane; Into the Woods – Stephanie Klapper; Once on This Island – Stephanie Klapper	**Regional Theatre – Play**: **Harry Potter and the Cursed Child – Jim Carnahan, Alexandre Bleau**; A Human Being, of a Sort – Karyn Casl, Destiny Lilly; A Raisin in the Sun – Karyn Casl, Destiny Lilly; Ghosts – Karyn Casl; "Master Harold"...and the Boys – Tara Rubin
**Los Angeles Theatre**: **Little Shop of Horrors – Ryan Bernard Tymensky**; A Play Is A Poem – Will Cantler, Karyn Casl; Associate: Destiny Lilly; Good Boys – Tiffany Little Canfield, Ryan Bernard Tymensky; Key Largo – Jeff Greenberg; Witch – Phyllis Schuringa	**Special Theatrical Performance**: **Pride Plays – James Calleri, Erica Jensen, Paul Davis**; The 24 Hour Plays Broadway Gala – Stephanie Klapper; Into the Woods – Chad Eric Murnane; Kinky Boots – Patrick Goodwin; Mack and Mabel – Mark Brandon
**Theatre Tours**: **The Band's Visit – Tara Rubin, Peter Van Dam**; Frozen – Rachel Hoffman, Laura Wade; Mean Girls – Bethany Knox; Once on This Island – Craig Burns; Summer: The Donna Summer Musical – Tara Rubin, Felicia Rudolph

=== Rosalie Joseph Humanitarian Award ===
- **The Actors Fund**

=== Hoyt Bowers Award ===
- **Robi Reed**
- **Tara Rubin**

=== Associate Spotlight Award ===
- **Gianna Butler**
- **Michael Rios**
