= 39th Artios Awards =

US film awards

- Date: March 7, 2024
- Site: The Beverly Hilton; The Edison Ballroom; White City House
- Country: United States
- Presented by: Casting Society of America
- Hosted by: Alex Edelman; Niecy Nash-Betts; Samantha Moore
- Website: www.castingsociety.com/awards/artios

The 39th Artios Awards, presented by the Casting Society of America, honoring the best originality, creativity and contribution of casting professionals to the overall quality of a film, television series, short form project, theatre production and commercial, were held on March 7, 2024, simultaneously at The Beverly Hilton in Los Angeles and Edison Ballroom in New York, and the White City House in London.

The nominations for the television, short form project, and theatre categories were announced on October 25, 2023. The nominees for the film categories were announced on January 12, 2024. Alex Edelman (New York), Niecy Nash-Betts (Los Angeles) and Samantha Moore (London) hosted the event simultaneously.

== Winners and nominees ==
=== Film ===
Feature Big Budget – Comedy: Are You There God? It's Me, Margaret. – Francine Maisler, Melissa Kostenbauder, Betsy Fippinger (Location Casting), Tara Feldstein (Location Casting), Chase Paris (Location Casting), Molly Rose (Associate Casting Director); Air – Mary Vernieu, Lindsay Graham Ahanonu, Sydney Shircliff (Associate Casting Director); Asteroid City – Douglas Aibel, Jina Jay (Location Casting), Matthew Glasner (Associate Casting Director); Cocaine Bear – Debra Zane, Dylan Jury, Ali Coffey (Location Casting); Wonka – Nina Gold	Feature Big Budget – Drama: Killers of the Flower Moon – Ellen Lewis, Rene Haynes, Kate Sprance (Associate Casting Director); The Color Purple – Bernard Telsey, Tiffany Little Canfield, Destiny Lilly; Maestro – Shayna Markowitz, Dayna Katz (Associate Casting Director); Oppenheimer – John Papsidera; Saltburn – Kharmel Cochrane
Feature Studio or Independent – Comedy: The Holdovers – Susan Shopmaker, Lisa Lobel (Location Casting), Angela Peri (Location Casting), Melissa Morris (Associate Casting Director); American Fiction – Jennifer Euston, Lisa Lobel (Location Casting), Angela Peri (Location Casting), Melissa Morris (Associate Casting Director); Bottoms – Laura Rosenthal, Maribeth Fox, Meagan Lewis (Location Casting), Kimberly Ostroy (Associate Casting Director); Joy Ride – Rich Delia, Kara Eide (Location Casting), Kris Woznesensky (Location Casting), Adam Richards (Associate Casting Director); Theater Camp – Kristian Charbonier, Bernard Telsey	Feature Studio or Independent – Drama: Past Lives – Ellen Chenoweth, Susanne Scheel; The Iron Claw – Susan Shopmaker, Brent Caballero (Location Casting); May December – Laura Rosenthal, Meagan Lewis (Location Casting), Rebecca Carfagna (Location Casting), Kimberly Ostroy (Associate Casting Director); Priscilla – Nicole Daniels, Courtney Bright, John Buchan, Jason Knight; Rustin – Avy Kaufman, Donna Belajac (Location Casting), Missy Finnell (Location Casting), Scotty Anderson (Associate Casting Director)
Feature Low Budget – Comedy or Drama: Memory – Susan Shopmaker; Birth/Rebirth – Allison Twardziak, Danielle Pretsfelder Demchick; Emily – Fiona Weir; Jules – Avy Kaufman; Monica – Emily Schweber, D. Lynn Meyers (Location Casting)	Feature Micro Budget – Comedy or Drama: Summoning Sylvia – Steven Tylor O'Connor; The Donor Party – Anthony J. Kraus; How I Learned to Fly – Jessica Sherman; What Comes Around – Eyde Belasco, Jeff Johnson (Location Casting); Your Lucky Day – Jessica Sherman
Feature Animation: Spider-Man: Across the Spider-Verse – Mary Hidalgo; Elemental – Natalie Lyon, Kevin Reher, Kate Hansen-Birnbaum (Associate Casting Director); Leo – Danielle Aufiero, Amber Horn; Teenage Mutant Ninja Turtles: Mutant Mayhem – Rich Delia, Adam Richards (Associate Casting Director); Wish – Grace C. Kim	The Zeitgeist Award: Barbie – Lucy Bevan, Olivia Grant (Associate Casting Director); The Flash – Rich Delia, Kate Ringsell, Adam Richards (Associate Casting Director); The Hunger Games: The Ballad of Songbirds & Snakes – Debra Zane, Dylan Jury, Simone Bär (Location Casting); Rebel Moon: Part One – A Child of Fire – Kristy Carlson, Jeanette Benzie (Associate Casting Director); Transformers: Rise of the Beasts – (Paramount Pictures): Wittney Horton, additional voice casting by Ruth Lambert and Robert McGee, Eve Streger (Associate Casting Director)

=== Television ===
Television Series – Comedy: Reservation Dogs – Angelique Midthunder, Chris Freihofer (Location Casting), Stacey Rice (Associate Casting Director), Tara Mazzucca (Associate Casting Director); Abbott Elementary – Wendy O'Brien; Barry – Sherry Thomas, Sharon Bialy, Stacia Kimler (Associate Casting Director); Only Murders in the Building – Bernard Telsey, Tiffany Little Canfield, Destiny Lilly; Ted Lasso – Theo Park	Television Series – Drama: Succession – Avy Kaufman, Scotty Anderson (Associate Casting Director); Better Call Saul – Sharon Bialy, Sherry Thomas, Russell Scott, Marie A.K. McMaster (Location Casting), Alyssa Morris (Associate Casting Director); The Boys – Robert J. Ulrich, Eric Dawson, Carol Kritzer, Jenny Lewis (Location Casting), Sara Kay (Location Casting); The Handmaid's Tale – Sharon Bialy, Sherry Thomas, Russell Scott, Robin Cook (Location Casting), Stacia Kimler (Associate Casting Director), Jonathan Oliveira (Associate Casting Director); Yellowjackets – Junie Lowry Johnson, Libby Goldstein, Corinne Clark (Location Casting), Jennifer Page (Location Casting), Josh Ropiequet (Associate Casting Director), Rebecca Davidson (Associate Casting Director)
Television Pilot and First Season – Comedy: The Bear – Jeanie Bacharach, Mickie Paskal (Location Casting), Jennifer Rudnicke (Location Casting) AJ Links (Location Casting); Jury Duty – Susie Farris, Walter Ware (Associate Casting Director); A League of Their Own – Felicia Fasano, Donna Belajac (Location Casting), Katie Lantz (Associate Casting Director), Missy Finnell (Location Casting Director); Poker Face – Mary Vernieu, Bret Howe, Christine Kromer (Location Casting), Angelique Midthunder (Location Casting), Derek Hersey (Associate Casting Director); Shrinking – Debby Romano, Brett Benner, Becca Burgess (Associate Casting Director)	Television Pilot and First Season – Drama: The Last of Us – Victoria Thomas, Corinne Clark (Location Casting), Jennifer Page (Location Casting), Megan Bayliss (Associate Casting Director); Bad Sisters – Nina Gold; The Diplomat – Julie Schubert, Lucinda Syson, Natasha Vincent; The Old Man – Denise Chamian, Jordana Sapiurka; The Summer I Turned Pretty – David H. Rapaport, Lyndsey Baldasare, Lisa Mae Fincannon (Location Casting), Kimberly Wistedt (Location Casting)
Limited Series: Beef – Charlene Lee, Claire Koonce, Danny Gordon (Associate Casting Director); Black Bird – Alexa L. Fogel, Meagan Lewis (Location Casting), Kathryn Zamora-Benson (Associate Casting Director); Dahmer – Monster: The Jeffrey Dahmer Story – Robert J. Ulrich, Eric Dawson, Carol Kritzer, Rachel Imbriglio (Associate Casting Director); Daisy Jones & the Six – Justine Arteta, Kim Davis-Wagner, Makis Gazis (Location Casting), Jane Flowers (Associate Casting Director); Fleishman Is in Trouble – Jodi Angstriech, Laura Rosenthal, Tracy Kaczorowski (Associate Casting Director)	Film, Non-Theatrical Release: Fire Island – Jessica Munks, Andrew Fem (Associate Casting Director); 13: The Musical – Kristian Charbonier, Bernard Telsey, Stephanie Gorin (Location Casting); Boston Strangler – Avy Kaufman, Carolyn Pickman (Location Casting), Matt Bouldry (Location Casting), Kyle Crand (Location Casting), Scotty Anderson (Associate Casting Director); Hocus Pocus 2 – Cathy Sandrich Gelfond, Amanda Mackey, Carolyn Pickman (Location Casting), Matt Bouldry (Location Casting), Kyle Crand (Location Casting), Erica Berger (Associate Casting Director); Weird: The Al Yankovic Story – Wendy O'Brien, Laura Aughton (Associate Casting Director)
Animated Series: Big Mouth – Julie Ashton; American Dad! – Christine Terry, Jackie Sollitto; Bob's Burgers – Julie Ashton; Family Guy – Christine Terry, Jackie Sollitto; Velma – Sarah Noonan, Agnes Kim	Children and Family Pilot and Series – Live Action: American Born Chinese – Leslie Woo, Julina Baber (Associate Casting Director); Best Foot Forward – Danielle Aufiero, Amber Horn, Steven Tylor O’Connor (Associate Casting Director); Bunk'd – Howard Meltzer, Timothy Pratt (Associate Casting Director), Biz Urban (Associate Casting Director); Doogie Kameāloha, M.D. – Leslie Woo, Rachel Whitley (Location Casting), Julina Baber (Associate Casting Director), Bret Anbe (Associate Casting Director); High School Musical: The Musical: The Series – Julie Ashton
Reality Series – Competition: RuPaul's Drag Race – Goloka Bolte, Ethan Petersen; The Circle – Erin Tomasello, Jazzy Collins (Casting Producer); Making the Cut – Alissa Haight Carlton, Asjai Lou; Top Chef – Ron Mare; The Traitors – Erin Tomasello, Jazzy Collins (Casting Producer)	Reality Series – Structured and Unstructured: Queer Eye – Danielle Gervais, Pamela Vallarelli, Jessica Jorgensen, Quinn Fegan, Lauren Levine (Casting Producer); The Great Christmas Light Fight – Kristen Moss; My Dream Quinceanera – Candra Nazzaro; The Real Housewives of New Jersey – Jessica Jorgensen, Danielle Gervais; Shark Tank – Mindy Zemrak
Live Television Performance, Variety, or Sketch – Comedy, Drama, or Musical: A Black Lady Sketch Show – Erica A. Hart; Beauty and the Beast: A 30th Celebration – Bernard Telsey, Ryan Bernard Tymesky, Brian Sutow (Associate Casting Director); I Think You Should Leave with Tim Robinson – Leslie Woo, Julina Baber (Associate Casting Director); Who Killed Santa? A Murderville Murder Mystery – Chrissy Fiorilli-Ellington, Ally Bader (Associate Casting Director); Would It Kill You to Laugh? – Melissa DeLizia

=== Short Form Projects ===
Short Film: Motherland – Matthew Glasner; Newbie – Shakyra Dowling; S.P.I.C. – Josy Rodriguez; Us – Lisa Zambetti; We Were Meant To – Hannah Cooper	Short Form Series: We're Doing Good – Alexa Pereira; Cars on the Road – Natalie Lyon, Kevin Reher, Kate Hansen-Birnbaum (Associate Casting Director); Die Hart 2: Die Harter – Chrissy Fiorilli-Ellington, Tara Feldstein (Location Casting), Chase Paris (Location Casting), Jane Flowers (Associate Casting Director); Juniors – Beth Levy Nelson; Level Up – Danya Solomon; Scream Park – Nickole Doro

=== Theatre ===
New York Broadway Theatre – Comedy or Drama: Leopoldstadt – Jim Carnahan, Maureen Kelleher; Death of a Salesman – Erica A. Hart, Daniel Swee; A Doll's House – Jim Carnahan, Alexandre Bleau; Good Night, Oscar – Stephen Kopel; Topdog/Underdog – Erica Jensen, Paul Davis	New York Broadway Theatre – Musical: Into the Woods – Craig Burns, Geoff Josselson, Bernard Telsey; & Juliet – Stephen Kopel, Carrie Gardner, Jillian Cimini, Stephanie Gorin (Location Casting), Sujotta Pace (Associate Casting Director); Kimberly Akimbo – Craig Burns, Ally Kiley (Associate Casting Director); Parade – Craig Burns, Ally Kiley (Associate Casting Director); Shucked – Stephen Kopel; Some Like It Hot – Bethany Knox
New York Theatre – Comedy or Drama: Downstate – Alaine Alldaffer, JC Clementz; A Bright New Boise – David Caparelliotis; Becky Nurse of Salem – Daniel Swee; The Seagull/Woodstock NY – Judy Henderson; Soft – Destiny Lilly	New York Theatre – Musical: Merrily We Roll Along – Jim Carnahan, Jason Thinger; Kinky Boots – Geoff Josselson; A Man of No Importance – Craig Burns; Titanique – Rachel Hoffman, Henry Russell Bergstein, Andrew Fem; White Girl in Danger – Henry Russell Bergstein, Destiny Lilly
Los Angeles Theatre: The Inheritance: Part 1 & Part 2 – Phyllis Schuringa; 2:22 A Ghost Story – David Caparelliotis; Kinky Boots – Ryan Bernard Tymensky; The Secret Garden – Michael Donovan, Richie Ferris; A Transparent Musical – Patrick Goodwin, Charlie Hano, Michael Donovan (Location Casting), Richie Ferris (Location Casting)	Regional Theatre: A Chorus Line – Stephanie Klapper; What We Talk About When We Talk About Anne Frank – David Caparelliotis; 42nd Street – Tara Rubin, Peter Van Dam, Kevin Metzger-Timson; Angels in America, Part One: The Millennium Approaches – Geoff Josselson, Katja Zarolinski; The Cherry Orchard – Lauren Port, Rachael Jimenez (Associate Casting Director); Clyde's – Lauren Port, Rachael Jimenez (Associate Casting Director)
Special Theatrical Performance: Fiddler on the Roof – Tara Rubin, Merri Sugarman, Becca McCracken (Location Casting); The Color Purple – Charlie Hano; Guys and Dolls – Geoff Josselson, Katja Zarolinski; Legally Blonde – Rachel Hoffman; Spamalot – Geoff Josselson, Katja Zarolinski; Sweeny Todd – Patrick Goodwin	Theatre Tours: Six (Boleyn Tour) – Tara Rubin, Peter Van Dam, Kevin Metzger-Timson; Bettlejuice – Rachel Hoffman; Into the Woods – Craig Burns, Geoff Josselson; Jagged Little Pill – Jillian Cimini, Sujotta Pace (Associate Casting Director); Tina: The Tina Turner Musical – Patrick Goodwin

=== Commercials ===
Commercial
- Spark: Autism Awareness – Ken Lazer
- Delta: "Kaleidoscope" – Liz Lewis, Aika Greenidge (Associate Casting Director)
- The Glenlivet's Father Day | What Does It Mean To Be a Dad Today? – Caitlin D. Jones
- Nurofen: "See My Pain" – Tree Petts
- OnStar: "Scary Better" – Chrissy Fiorilli-Ellington, Caitlin D. Jones (Associate Casting Director)
- Talm That Talk "Family" Prostate Cancer – Ken Lazer

== Honorary Awards ==
- Hoyt Bowers Award – Sharon Klein
- Lynn Stalmaster Award – Ava DuVernay
- Rosalie Joseph Humanitarian Award – Karlee Fomalont
- Marion Dougherty New York Apple Award – Drama Book Shop
