= 31st Artios Awards =

2016 television awards

- Date: January 21, 2016
- Location: Hard Rock Cafe, New York City, United States; Beverly Hilton Hotel, Los Angeles, United States
- Country: United States
- Presented by: Casting Society of America
- Hosted by: Tituss Burgess (New York City); Greg Grunberg (Los Angeles)
- Website: www.castingsociety.com/awards/artios

The 31st Artios Awards, presented by the Casting Society of America, honored the best originality, creativity and the contribution of casting to the overall quality of a film, television, theatre and short-form projects. The ceremony was held on January 21, 2016, in simultaneous ceremonies at the Beverly Hilton Hotel, Los Angeles and Hard Rock Cafe in New York City. The New York City ceremony was hosted by Tituss Burgess, while Greg Grunberg hosted the Los Angeles ceremony.

The television, theatre and short-form projects nominations were announced on August 21, 2015. The film nominations were announced on January 8, 2016.

== Winners and nominees ==
Winners are listed first and highlighted in boldface:

=== Film ===
**Big Budget – Comedy**: **The Big Short – Francine Maisler; Location Casting: Meagan Lewis**; The Intern – Bernard Telsey, Laray Mayfield, Tiffany Little Canfield; Associate: David Vaccari; Joy – Mary Vernieu, Lindsay Graham; Location Casting: Angela Peri; Sisters – Kerry Barden, Paul Schnee; Associate: Joey Montenarello, Adam Richards; Tomorrowland – April Webster, Alyssa Weisberg; Location Casting: Corinne Clark, Jennifer Page	**Big Budget – Drama**: **Straight Outta Compton – Cindy Tolan, Victoria Thomas; Location Casting: Meagan Lewis, Beth Sepko, Carolyn Pickman, Lucinda Syson, Pat Moran; Associate: Judith Sunga**; Bridge of Spies – Ellen Lewis; Associate: Kate Sprance; Mad Max: Fury Road – Ronna Kress, Nikki Barrett; Spotlight – Kerry Barden, Paul Schnee; Location Casting: John Buchan, Jason Knight, Carolyn Pickman; Associate: Joey Montenarello, Adam Richards; Star Wars: The Force Awakens – Nina Gold, April Webster, Alyssa Weisberg; Associate: Jessica Sherman
**Studio or Independent – Comedy**: **Me and Earl and the Dying Girl – Angela Demo; Location Casting: Nancy Mosser, Katie Shenot**; Infinitely Polar Bear – Douglas Aibel; Location Casting: Carolyn Pickman; Associate: Henry Russell Bergstein; Ricki and the Flash – Bernard Telsey, Tiffany Little Canfield; Associate: Conrad Woolfe; Sleeping with Other People – Jennifer Euston, Emer O'Callaghan; While We're Young – Douglas Aibel, Francine Maisler; Associate: Henry Russell Bergstein	**Studio or Independent – Drama**: **Room – Fiona Weir, Robin D. Cook; Location Casting: Kathleen Chopin; Associate: Jonathan Oliveira**; Brooklyn – Fiona Weir; Location Casting: Lucie Robitaille, Jim Carnahan; Carol – Laura Rosenthal; Associate: Maribeth Fox, Jodi Angstreich; The Danish Girl – Nina Gold; Trumbo – David Rubin; Location Casting: Meagan Lewis; Associate: Melissa Pryor
**Low Budget – Comedy**: **Dope – Kim Coleman**; Big Stone Gap – Henry Russell Bergstein, Stephanie Holbrook, Erica Arvold, Anne Chapman; Grandma – Douglas Aibel, Henry Russell Bergstein; The Mend – Kerry Barden, Paul Schnee, Allison Estrin; Mistress America – Douglas Aibel; Associate: Henry Russell Bergstein	**Low Budget – Drama**: **The Stanford Prison Experiment – Angela Demo**; It Follows – Mark Bennett; James White – Susan Shopmaker; Meadowland – Richard Hicks; Sisterhood of Night – Laura Rosenthal, Maribeth Fox, Jodi Angstreich
**Animation**: **Inside Out – Kevin Reher, Natalie Lyon**; The Good Dinosaur – Kevin Reher, Natalie Lyon; Pixies – Brad Gilmore; Tinker Bell and the Legend of the NeverBeast – Jason Henkel

=== Television ===
**Television Series – Comedy**: **Transparent – Eyde Belasco**; Episodes – Kelly Valentine Hendry, Victor Jenkins; Location Casting: Amy Britt, Trisha Debski; Orange Is the New Black – Jennifer Euston; Associate: Emer O'Callaghan; Silicon Valley – Jeanne McCarthy, Nicole Abellera; Veep – Location Casting: Pat Moran	**Television Series – Drama**: **Game of Thrones – Nina Gold**; Bloodline – Debra Zane; Location Casting: Lori Wyman; Associate: Shayna Markowitz, Marie-Thérèse Verbruggen, Erin Fragetta; Empire – Leah Daniels-Butler; Location Casting: Claire Simon; The Good Wife – Mark Saks; Associate: John Andrews; House of Cards – Laray Mayfield, Julie Schubert
**Television Pilot – Comedy**: **Transparent – Eyde Belasco**; Black-ish – Alexis Frank Koczara, Christine Smith Shevchenko; Associate: Amanda Lenker Doyle; Grace and Frankie – Tracy Lilienfield; Associate: Emily Towler; Jane the Virgin – Alyson Silverberg, Jonathan Clay Harris; Unbreakable Kimmy Schmidt – Jennifer Euston; Associate: Emer O'Callaghan	**Television Pilot – Drama**: **Empire – Leah Daniels-Butler; Location Casting: Claire Simon; Associate: Shelby Cherniet**; The Affair – Junie Lowry Johnson, Libby Goldstein, Julie Tucker, Ross Meyerson; Associate: Lisa Soltau; Better Call Saul – Sharon Bialy, Sherry Thomas, Russell Scott; Location Casting: Kiira Arai; Gotham – Sharon Bialy, Sherry Thomas, Gohar Gazazyan; How to Get Away with Murder – Linda Lowy; Location Casting: Diane Heery, Jason Loftus, David Caparelliotis; Associate: Jamie Castro, Lauren Port
**Television Movie or Mini Series**: **Olive Kitteridge – Laura Rosenthal; Location Casting: Carolyn Pickman; Associate: Maribeth Fox, Jodi Angstreich**; American Horror Story: Freak Show – Robert J. Ulrich, Eric Dawson, Carol Kritzer; Location Casting: Meagan Lewis; Associate: Becky Silverman; The Slap – Avy Kaufman; Wayward Pines – David Rubin; Location Casting: Heike Brandstatter, Coreen Mayrs; Associate: Melissa Pryor; Wolf Hall – Nina Gold	**Children's Pilot and Series (Live Action)**: **Girl Meets World – Sally Stiner, Barbie Block, Brett Greenstein, Collin Daniel, Howard Meltzer; Associate: Sherie Hernandez**; Austin & Ally – Carol Goldwasser; Dog with a Blog – Carol Goldwasser; Instant Mom – Victoria Thomas; Lab Rats – Howard Meltzer
**Television Animation (Adult)**: **Bob's Burgers – Julie Ashton-Barson**; American Dad! – Linda Lamontagne; BoJack Horseman – Linda Lamontagne; Family Guy – Linda Lamontagne; Robot Chicken – Linda Lamontagne	**Television Animation (Children)**: **Bubble Guppies – Michelle Levitt, Gene Vassilaros; Associate: Shiondre Austin, Danielle Pretsfelder**; The Adventures of Puss in Boots – Ania O'Hare; Dora and Friends: Into the City! – Michelle Levitt; Associate: Danielle Pretsfelder; Sanjay and Craig – Gene Vassilaros, Sarah Noonan, Meredith Layne; Associate: Shiondre Austin; Teenage Mutant Ninja Turtles – Gene Vassilaros, Sarah Noonan, Meredith Layne; Associate: Shiondre Austin

=== Short-Form Projects ===
**Short Film**: **Muted – Robin Lippin**; Day One – Becky Silverman; Dragula – Jonathan Clay Harris; Rita Mahtoubian Is Not a Terrorist – Erica Silverman Bream; Share – Lauren Grey	**Web Series**: **Deadbeat – Jessica Daniels**; Cop Show – Adrienne Stern; Karl Manhair: Postal Inspector – Judy Bowman; Olive and Mocha – Meg Morman, Sunday Boling; Resident Advisors – Alexis Frank Koczara, Christine Shevchenko; Associate: Amanda Lenker Doyle; Side Effects – Sheryl Levine

=== Theatre ===
**New York Broadway Theatre – Comedy**: **You Can't Take It with You – Jim Carnahan; Associate: Jillian Cimini**; Fish in the Dark – David Caparelliotis; Associate: Lauren Port; Living on Love – James Calleri, Paul Davis; Love Letters – William Cantler, Andrew Femenella	**New York Broadway Theatre – Drama**: **The Curious Incident of the Dog in the Night-Time – Daniel Swee, Cindy Tolan; Associate: Adam Caldwell**; The Audience – Daniel Swee, Nora Brennan; Constellations – Jim Carnahan, Nancy Piccione; The Elephant Man – James Calleri, Paul Davis; This Is Our Youth – William Cantler
**New York Broadway Theatre – Musical**: **The King and I – Abbie Brady-Dalton**; An American in Paris – Rachel Hoffman; Finding Neverland – Patrick Goodwin, Bernard Telsey; Something Rotten! – Bethany Knox; On the Twentieth Century – Jim Carnahan, Stephen Kopel	**New York Theatre – Comedy**: **A Month in the Country – James Calleri, Paul Davis**; The 39 Steps – Jack Bowdan; Big Love – Karyn Casl; The Flick – Alaine Alldaffer; What I Did Last Summer – William Cantler
**New York Theatre – Drama**: **Between Riverside and Crazy – William Cantler; Associate: Karyn Casl**; The Glass Menagerie – Stephanie Klapper; Hamlet – James Calleri, Erica Jensen; Punk Rock – William Cantler; Associate: Karyn Casl; The World of Extreme Happiness – Nancy Piccione, Adam Belcuore	**New York Theatre – Musical**: **Clinton: The Musical – Tara Rubin, Kaitlin Shaw**; Fly by Night – Alaine Alldaffer; Found – Rachel Hoffman, Howie Cherpakov; New York Spring Spectacular – Patrick Goodwin; Revolution – James Calleri, Paul Davis, Erica Jensen
**Regional Theatre East**: **Carousel – Jay Binder; Location Casting: Claire Simon; Associate: Becca McCracken**; Ain't Misbehavin' – Tara Rubin, Kaitlin Shaw; Arcadia – Tara Rubin, Laura Schutzel; Can-Can – Tara Rubin, Lindsay Levine; Diner – Justin Huff, Bernard Telsey; First Wives Club – Craig Burns	**Regional Theatre West**: **Othello – Tara Rubin**; Arms and the Man – David Caparelliotis; Associate: Lauren Port; Bright Star – Howie Cherpakov; Les Misérables – Patrick Goodwin; One Man, Two Guvnors – Amy Potozkin, Joanne DeNaut
**Special Theatrical Performance East**: **Parade – Craig Burns**; Oliver! – Michael Cassara; Paint Your Wagon – Jay Binder, Jack Bowdan, Jason Styres; Tick, Tick... Boom! – Carrie Gardner, Stephen Kopel; Zorba! – Jay Binder, Jack Bowdan	**Special Theatrical Performance West**: **Unscreened Summer Series – Meg Morman, Sunday Boling**; The Addams Family – Megan Larche Dominick; Hello, Dolly! – Megan Larche Dominick; Tarzan – Megan Larche Dominick
**Los Angeles Theatre**: **Spring Awakening – Beth Lipari, Bruce H. Newberg**; The Country House – David Caparelliotis, Phyllis Schuringa; Hair – Margery Simkin, Michael Donovan; Race – Mark B. Simon; What the Butler Saw – Mark B. Simon	**Theatre Tours**: **Matilda the Musical – Jim Carnahan, Nora Brennan, Jillian Cimini**; Blithe Spirit – William Cantler; Cinderella – Cindy Tolan, Adam Caldwell; Irving Berlin's White Christmas – Jason Styres; Kinky Boots – Justin Huff

=== Hoyt Bowers Award ===
- **Bernard Telsey**

=== Career Achievement Award ===
- **Danny Boyle**

=== New York Apple Award ===
- **Michelle and Robert King**
