= 35th Artios Awards =

Annual US film and television award

- Date: January 30, 2020
- Location: New York City, United States; Los Angeles, United States; London, United Kingdom
- Country: United States
- Presented by: Casting Society of America
- Hosted by: Michelle Buteau (New York City); Ron Funches (Los Angeles); Jason Isaacs (London)
- Website: www.castingsociety.com/awards/artios

The 35th Artios Awards, presented by the Casting Society of America, honoring the best originality, creativity and contribution of casting to the overall quality of film, television, theatre and short-form projects, was held on January 30, 2020, in New York City, Los Angeles and London.

The television and theatre nominations were announced on September 24, 2019, but the film nominations were announced on January 2, 2020.

== Winners and nominees ==
Winners are listed first and highlighted in boldface:

=== Film ===
**Big Budget – Comedy**: **Knives Out – Mary Vernieu; Location Casting: Angela Peri; Associate: Brett Howe**; Dolemite Is My Name – Mary Vernieu, Lindsay Graham Ahanonu; Hustlers – Gayle Keller; Rocketman – Reginald Poerscot-Edgerton; Uncut Gems – Francine Maisler	**Big Budget – Drama**: **Once Upon a Time in Hollywood – Victoria Thomas**; 1917 – Nina Gold; The Irishman – Ellen Lewis; Associate: Kate Sprance; Joker – Shayna Markowitz; Little Women – Francine Maisler, Kathy Driscoll-Mohler; Location Casting: Douglas Aibel, Carolyn Pickman
**Studio or Independent – Comedy**: **Jojo Rabbit – Des Hamilton**; Brittany Runs a Marathon – Laura Rosenthal, Maribeth Fox; The Dead Don't Die – Ellen Lewis; Associate: Kate Sprance; The Farewell – Leslie Woo; Late Night – Laura Rosenthal, Maribeth Fox; Associate: Kimberly Ostroy; Poms – Mary Vernieu, Marisol Roncali; Location Casting: Meagan Lewis	**Studio or Independent – Drama**: **Marriage Story – Francine Maisler, Douglas Aibel; Associate: Kathy Driscoll-Mohler**; Harriet – Kim Coleman; Location Casting: Erica Arvold, Anne Chapman; Associate: Meghan Apostoles; Honey Boy – Chelsea Ellis Bloch, John Papsidera; Judy – Fiona Weir, Alice Searby; Waves – Avy Kaufman; Location Casting: Mark Mullen
**Low Budget – Comedy or Drama**: **The Last Black Man in San Francisco – Julia Kim; Location Casting: Nina Henninger**; Clemency – Kerry Barden, Paul Schnee; Associate: Roya Semnanian; Diane – Jodi Angstreich; Skin – Jodi Angstreich, Laura Rosenthal, Maribeth Fox; Them That Follow – John McAlary, Orly Sitowitz	**Micro Budget – Comedy or Drama**: **Skin in the Game – Matthew Lessall**; Low Tide – Susan Shopmaker, Lois Drabkin; Mickey and the Bear – Avy Kaufman; The True Don Quixote – Stephanie Holbrook; Location Casting: Ryan Glorioso; Associate: Justin Coulter; The Wind – Meg Morman, Sunday Boling
**Animation**: **The Lion King – Sarah Halley Finn; Associate: Jason B. Stamey (tie)**; **Toy Story 4 – Kevin Reher, Natalie Lyon (tie)**; Abominable – Christi Soper Hilt; Frozen 2 – Jamie Sparer Roberts, Associate: Sarah Raoufpur; How to Train Your Dragon: The Hidden World – Christi Soper Hilt	**The Zeitgeist Award**: **Star Wars: The Rise of Skywalker – Nina Gold, April Webster, Alyssa Weisberg; Associate: Angela Young**; Avengers: Endgame – Sarah Halley Finn; Location Casting: Chase Paris, Tara Feldstein Bennett; Associate: Jason B. Stamey; It Chapter Two – Rich Delia; Location Casting: Stephanie Gorin; Associate: Coco Kleppinger

=== Television ===
**Television Series – Comedy**: **The Marvelous Mrs. Maisel – Cindy Tolan; Location Casting: Juliette Ménager; Associate: Anne Davison**; Barry – Sherry Thomas, Sharon Bialy; Associate: Stacia Kimler; Better Things – Felicia Fasano; Associate: Samantha Rood; GLOW – Jennifer Euston, Elizabeth Barnes; Associate: Seth Caskey; Veep – Dorian Frankel, Sibby Kirchgessner; Associate: Marlise Gunzenhauser	**Television Series – Drama**: **Game of Thrones – Nina Gold, Robert Sterne; Location Casting: Carla Stronge**; The Deuce – Alexa L. Fogel; Associate: Kathryn Zamora-Benson, Elizabeth Berra; The Handmaid's Tale – Sharon Bialy, Sherry Thomas, Russell Scott; Location Casting: Robin D. Cook; Associate: Stacia Kimler, Jonathan Oliveira; Ozark – Alexa L. Fogel; Location Casting: Chase Paris, Tara Feldstein Bennett; Associate: Kathryn Zamora-Benson; This Is Us – Tiffany Little Canfield, Josh Einsohn, Bernie Telsey
**Television Pilot and First Season – Comedy**: **Russian Doll – Christine Kromer; Associate: Andrew Femenella**; Dead to Me – Sherry Thomas, Sharon Bialy, Russell Scott; PEN15 – Melissa DeLizia; The Kominsky Method – Nikki Valko, Ken Miller, Tara Treacy; Shrill – Collin Daniel, Brett Greenstein	**Television Pilot and First Season – Drama**: **Pose – Alexa L. Fogel; Associate: Kathryn Zamora-Benson, Caitlin D. Jones**; Narcos: Mexico – Carla Hool; Succession – Francine Maisler, Douglas Aibel, Henry Russell Bergstein; The Umbrella Academy – Junie Lowry Johnson, Libby Goldstein, April Webster; Location Casting: Robin D. Cook; Associate: Samantha Garrabrant, Josh Ropiequet, Jonathan Oliveira; You – David H. Rapaport, Lyndsey Baldasare; Location Casting: Beth Bowling, Kim Miscia
**Limited Series**: **When They See Us – Aisha Coley; Location Casting: Billy Hopkins, Ashley Ingram**; The Act – Sharon Bialy, Sherry Thomas; Location Casting: Lisa Mae Fincannon, Craig Fincannon; Associate: Kimberly Wistedt; Chernobyl – Nina Gold, Robert Sterne; Escape at Dannemora – Rachel Tenner; Location Casting: Nancy Mosser, Katie Shenot; Associate: Bess Fifer, Charlene Lee; Fosse/Verdon – Bernard Telsey, Tiffany Little Canfield; Associate: Amelia Rasche McCarthy; Sharp Objects – David Rubin; Location Casting: Chase Paris, Tara Feldstein Bennett; Associate: Andrea Bunker	**Film, Non-Theatrical Release**: **To All the Boys I've Loved Before – Tamara-Lee Notcutt; Location Casting: Tiffany Mak; Associate: Alexis Allen**; Bird Box – Mary Vernieu, Michelle Wade Byrd, Jina Jay; Black Mirror: Bandersnatch – Jina Jay; Deadwood – Junie Lowry Johnson, Libby Goldstein; Associate: Josh Ropiequet; King Lear – Nina Gold
**Live Television Performance, Variety or Sketch Comedy**: **Live in Front of a Studio Audience: "All in the Family" and "The Jeffersons" – Marc Hirschfeld, Geralyn Flood; Associate: Katrina Wandel George**; After After Party – Jessica Daniels; Drunk History – Melissa DeLizia; Random Acts of Flyness – Susan Shopmaker; Associate: Emily Fleischer; Rent: Live – Bernie Telsey, Tiffany Little Canfield; Associate: Ryan Bernard Tymensky	**Children's Pilot and Series (Live Action)**: **Andi Mack – Amber Horn, Danielle Aufiero; Associate: Steven Tylor O'Connor**; Alexa & Katie – Sally Stiner, Barbie Block; Bunk'd – Howard Meltzer; Associate: Salvatore Schiavone; Fuller House – Alexis Frank Koczara, Christine Smith Shevchenko; Associate: Gianna Butler; Henry Danger – Krisha Bullock, Jamie Snow; Raven's Home – Danielle Aufiero, Amber Horn
**Television Animation**: **Big Mouth – Julie Ashton-Barson**; Bob's Burgers – Julie Ashton-Barson; BoJack Horseman – Linda Lamontagne; She-Ra and the Princesses of Power – Ania O'Hare; SpongeBob SquarePants – Shannon Reed, Shiondre Austin	**Reality Series**: **Queer Eye – Gretchen Palek, Danielle Gervais, Ally Capriotti Grant, Quinn Fegan**; Born This Way – Sasha Alpert, Megan Sleeper; Intervention – Kim Swanson; Associate: Haley Blaine Weinstein; RuPaul's Drag Race – Ethan Petersen, Goloka Bolte; The Voice – Michelle McNulty

=== Short-Form Projects ===
**Short Film**: **Skin – Jessica Sherman**; Evelyn x Evelyn – Sara Isaacson; Miller & Son – Russell Boast; Mr. Malcolm's List – Tamara-Lee Notcutt; The Neighbors' Window – Henry Russell Bergstein	**Short Form Series**: **It's Bruno! – Bess Fifer**; The Dead Girl's Detective Agency – Sunday Boling, Meg Morman; The Donors – Nickole Doro, Shayna Sherwood; Love, Death & Robots – Ivy Isenberg; Location Casting: Kristina Ederly; Mr. Student Body President – Nickole Doro, Shayna Sherwood, Romy Stutman; The Real Bros of Simi Valley – Gianna Butler

=== Theatre ===
**New York Broadway Theatre – Comedy or Drama**: **To Kill a Mockingbird – Daniel Swee**; Choir Boy – Nancy Piccione, Kelly Gillespie; The Ferryman – Jim Carnahan, Jillian Cimini; Hillary and Clinton – David Caparelliotis; Network – Bernie Telsey, Karyn Casl	**New York Broadway Theatre – Musical**: **Hadestown – Duncan Stewart, Benton Whitley**; Ain't Too Proud: The Life and Times of The Temptations – Tara Rubin, Merri Sugarman; Associate: Claire Burke; The Cher Show – Bernie Telsey, Patrick Goodwin; The Prom – Bethany Knox; Tootsie – Jim Carnahan
**New York Broadway Theatre – Revival, Comedy or Drama**: **The Waverly Gallery – David Caparelliotis, Lauren Port**; All My Sons – Jim Carnahan, Carrie Gardner; Burn This – Jim Carnahan, James Calleri, Erica Jensen; King Lear – David Caparelliotis; Torch Song – Adam Caldwell	**New York Broadway Theatre – Revival, Musical**: **Oklahoma! – Adam Caldwell, Will Cantler**; Kiss Me, Kate – Jim Carnahan, Stephen Kopel
**New York Theatre – Comedy or Musical**: **Fiddler on the Roof in Yiddish – Jamibeth Margolis**; Alice by Heart – Bernie Telsey, Rebecca Scholl; BLKS – Will Cantler, Karyn Casl; Carmen Jones – Rebecca Scholl; Clueless – Tara Rubin, Merri Sugarman; Associate: Xavier Rubiano; Usual Girls – Carrie Gardner, Jillian Cimini	**New York Theatre – Drama**: **Daddy – Judy Henderson; Associate: Nick Peciaro**; Blue Ridge – Karyn Casl; Days of Rage – Adam Caldwell; Good Grief – Henry Russell Bergstein; Mary Page Marlowe – Karyn Casl; The True – Judy Henderson; Associate: Nick Peciaro
**Regional Theatre**: **In the Heights – Tara Rubin, Claire Burke**; A Doll's House, Part 2 – Paul Davis; Barefoot in the Park – David Caparelliotis, Lauren Port; Clybourne Park – Michael Donovan; Associate: Richie Ferris; Dangerous House – Will Cantler, Karyn Casl; Fun Home – Chad Eric Murnane	**Los Angeles Theatre**: **Sweat – Heidi Levitt; NY Casting: Billy Hopkins, Ashley Ingram; Associate: Marin Hope**; Love, Actually Live – Duncan Stewart, Benton Whitley; Ragtime – Ryan Bernard Tymensky; Sweet Charity – Michael Donovan; Associate: Richie Ferris; Tiny Beautiful Things – Nicole Arbusto, Jordan Thaler, Heidi Griffiths; The 26th Annual Young Playwright's Festival – Erica Silverman Bream, Cara Chute Rosenbaum
**Special Theatrical Performance**: **Annie – Margery Simkin, Michael Donovan, Beth Lipari; Associate: Richie Ferris**; A Chorus Line – Jay Binder, Justin Bohon; Antigone in Ferguson at Harlem Stage – Eyde Belasco; Pride Plays – James Calleri, Paul Davis, Erica Jensen; Songs for a New World – Carrie Gardner, Stephen Kopel; The Wiz – Megan Larche Dominick	**Theatre Tours**: **Hamilton – Bethany Knox; Associate: Lauren Harris**; Come from Away – Rachel Hoffman; Dear Evan Hansen – Tara Rubin, Lindsey Levine; Associate: Xavier Rubiano; Falsettos – Tara Rubin, Eric Woodall, Kaitlin Shaw; Hello, Dolly! – Bernie Telsey, Craig Burns; Associate: Lauren Harris

=== Lynn Stalmaster Award ===
- **Geena Davis**

=== Marion Dougherty New York Apple Award ===
- **Audra McDonald**

=== Hoyt Bowers Award ===
- **Deborah Aquila**

=== Rosalie Joseph Humanitarian Award ===
- **Andrew Femenella**

=== Artios Award for Creative Collaboration ===
- **Tim Bevan**
- **Eric Fellner**

=== Excellence in Casting Award ===
- **Andy Pryor**

=== Special Recognition ===
- **Pippa Markham, Kate Buckley and Gillian Hawser** for their work in furthering casting honors with the creation of the BAFTA Casting Awards for television and film.
