= 34th Artios Awards =

Annual US film and television award

- Date: January 31, 2019
- Location: Stage 48, New York City, United States; Beverly Hilton Hotel, Los Angeles, United States
- Country: United States
- Presented by: Casting Society of America
- Hosted by: Bridget Everett (New York City); June Diane Raphael and Paul Scheer (Los Angeles)
- Website: www.castingsociety.com/awards/artios

The 34th Artios Awards, presented by the Casting Society of America, honored the best originality, creativity and the contribution of casting to the overall quality of a film, television, theatre and short-form projects. The ceremony was held on January 31, 2019, in simultaneous ceremonies at the Beverly Hilton Hotel, Los Angeles and Stage 48 in New York City. The New York City ceremony was hosted by Bridget Everett, while June Diane Raphael and Paul Scheer hosted the Los Angeles ceremony.

The television and theatre nominations were announced on September 20, 2018. The film nominations were announced on January 4, 2019.

== Winners and nominees ==
Winners are listed first and highlighted in boldface:

=== Film ===
**Big Budget – Comedy**: **Green Book – Rick Montgomery; Location Casting: Meagan Lewis; Associate: Thomas Sullivan**; The Ballad of Buster Scruggs – Ellen Chenoweth; Location Casting: Jo Edna Boldin; Associate: Susanne Scheel; Location Associate: Marie A.K. McMaster; Deadpool 2 – Mary Vernieu, Marisol Roncali; Location Casting: Corinne Clark, Jennifer Page, Yumi Takada, Nina Henninger; Associate: Raylin Sabo; Game Night – Rich Delia; Location Casting: Tara Feldstein Bennett, Chase Paris; Associate: Adam Richards; Mary Poppins Returns – Bernard Telsey, Tiffany Little Canfield; Associate: Conrad Woolfe; UK Associate: Sarah Trevis	**Big Budget – Drama**: **Vice – Francine Maisler; Additional Casting: Amber Wakefield**; A Star Is Born – Mary Vernieu, Lindsay Graham; Associate: Raylin Sabo; Boy Erased – Carmen Cuba; Location Casting: Tara Feldstein Bennett, Chase Paris; Associate: Shelby Cherniet; The Hate U Give – Yesi Ramirez; Location Casting: Tara Feldstein Bennett, Chase Paris; Widows – Francine Maisler; Location Casting: Jennifer Rudnicke, Mickie Paskal; Associate: Amber Wakefield
**Studio or Independent – Comedy**: **Crazy Rich Asians – Terri Taylor; Associate: Sarah Domeier**; Book Club – Kerry Barden, Paul Schnee, Avy Kaufman; Associate: Roya Semnanian, Joey Montenarello; Love, Simon – Denise Chamian; Location Casting: Tara Feldstein Bennett, Chase Paris; Private Life – Jeanne McCarthy, Rori Bergman; Associate: Karlee Fomalont; Sorry to Bother You – Eyde Belasco; Location Casting: Nina Henninger; Location Associate: Sarah Kliban	**Studio or Independent – Drama**: **BlacKkKlansman – Kim Taylor-Coleman**; Beautiful Boy – Francine Maisler; Associate: Amber Wakefield; Ben Is Back – Bernard Telsey; Can You Ever Forgive Me? – Jennifer Euston; Associate: SJ Allocco; If Beale Street Could Talk – Cindy Tolan; Associate: Anne Davison
**Low Budget – Comedy or Drama**: **The Kindergarten Teacher – Stephanie Holbrook, Henry Russell Bergstein**; A Private War – Jina Jay; The Miseducation of Cameron Post – Jessica Daniels; Monsters and Men – Avy Kaufman; Associate: Scotty Anderson; Unsane – Carmen Cuba	**Micro Budget – Comedy or Drama**: **Madeline's Madeline – Stephanie Holbrook**; Billy Boy – Robert J. Ulrich, Eric Dawson, Carol Kritzer; Dead Women Walking – Rich Delia; Associate: Adam Richards; Searching – Lindsey Weissmueller; Associate: Mayank Bhatter; Unlovable – Meg Morman, Sunday Boling
**Animation**: **Isle of Dogs – Douglas Aibel**; Incredibles 2 – Kevin Reher, Natalie Lyon; Ralph Breaks the Internet – Jamie Sparer Roberts; Associate: Sarah Raoufpur; Smallfoot – Ruth Lambert	**The Zeitgeist Award**: **Black Panther – Sarah Halley Finn; Location Casting: Meagan Lewis; Associate: Jason B. Stamey, Nicholas Amick Mudd**; A Quiet Place – Jodi Angstreich, Maribeth Fox, Laura Rosenthal; Bumblebee – Denise Chamian; Location Casting: Nina Henninger; Additional Voice Casting: Robert McGee, Ruth Lambert; Associate: Beth Day; Location Associate: Sarah Kliban; Fantastic Beasts: The Crimes of Grindelwald – Fiona Weir; Ready Player One – Ellen Lewis, Lucy Bevan; Associate: Kate Sprance

=== Television ===
**Television Series – Comedy**: **Atlanta – Alexa L. Fogel; Location Casting: Tara Feldstein Bennett, Chase Paris; Associate: Kathryn Zamora-Benson**; Better Things – Felicia Fasano; Associate: Tara Nostramo; Dear White People – Kim Coleman; Grace and Frankie – Tracy Lilienfield; Associate: Emily Towler; Insecure – Victoria Thomas	**Television Series – Drama**: **The Crown – Nina Gold, Robert Sterne**; The Americans – Rori Bergman; Associate: Dayna Katz; Game of Thrones – Nina Gold, Robert Sterne; Location Casting: Carla Stronge; The Handmaid's Tale – Sharon Bialy, Sherry Thomas, Russell Scott; Location Casting: Robin D. Cook; Associate: Jonathan Oliveira; This Is Us – Bernard Telsey, Tiffany Little Canfield, Josh Einsohn; Associate: Ryan Bernard Tymensky
**Television Pilot and First Season – Comedy**: **The Marvelous Mrs. Maisel – Jeanie Bacharach, Cindy Tolan; Associate: Anne Davison, Betsy Fippinger**; Atypical – Bernard Telsey, Tiffany Little Canfield, Josh Einsohn; Associate: Ryan Bernard Tymensky, Rachel Dill; Barry – Sherry Thomas, Sharon Bialy; Associate: Stacia Kimler; GLOW – Jennifer Euston, Elizabeth Barnes; Associate: Seth Caskey; Young Sheldon – Nikki Valko, Ken Miller, Peter Pappas	**Television Pilot and First Season – Drama**: **Ozark – Alexa L. Fogel; Location Casting: Tara Feldstein Bennett, Chase Paris; Associate: John Ort**; The Chi – Carmen Cuba; Location Casting: Christal Karge, Marisa Ross; Associate: Judith Sunga, Jenn Noyes; Claws – Cathy Sandrich Gelfond, Jenn Presser; Location Casting: Meagan Lewis; The Deuce – Alexa L. Fogel; Associate: Kathryn Zamora-Benson; The Looming Tower – Avy Kaufman
**Limited Series**: **Godless – Ellen Lewis; Location Casting: Jo Edna Boldin, Helen Geier; Native American Casting: Rene Haynes; Associate: Kate Sprance, Marie A.K. McMaster**; The Assassination of Gianni Versace: American Crime Story – Nicole Daniels, Courtney Bright; Black Mirror – Jina Jay; Additional U.S. Casting: Henry Russell Bergstein; Location Casting: Stephanie Gorin; Patrick Melrose – Nina Gold; The Sinner – Cami Patton, Jennifer Lare, Stephanie Holbrook, Henry Russell Bergstein, Douglas Aibel; Location Casting: Tracy Kilpatrick; Associate: Blair Foster	**Film, Non-Theatrical Release**: **Paterno – Ellen Chenoweth; Associate: Susanne Scheel**; Fahrenheit 451 – Douglas Aibel, Henry Russell Bergstein; Location Casting: Robin D. Cook; Associate: Jonathan Oliveira; Flint – Susan Edelman; Menendez: Blood Brothers – Brett Greenstein, Collin Daniel; Associate: Sherie Hernandez; The Kissing Booth – Gary M. Zuckerbrod; Location Casting: Mito Skellern
**Live Television Performance, Variety or Sketch Comedy**: **Jesus Christ Superstar Live in Concert – Bernard Telsey, Patrick Goodwin**; A Christmas Story Live! – Bernard Telsey, Tiffany Little Canfield, Rachel Hoffman; Associate: Rachel Dill; Drunk History – Melissa DeLizia; Nickelodeon's Sizzling Summer Camp Special – Julie Rose, Ann Maney; Associate: Lindsay Klein	**Children's Pilot and Series (Live Action)**: **A Series of Unfortunate Events – David Rubin; Location Casting: Corinne Clark, Jennifer Page; Associate: Andrea Bunker**; Alexa & Katie – Sally Stiner; Andi Mack – Barbie Block, Amber Horn, Danielle Aufiero; Associate: Steven Tylor O'Connor; Fuller House – Alexis Frank Koczara, Christine Smith Shevchenko; Associate: Gianna Butler; School of Rock – Suzanne Goddard-Smythe
**Television Animation**: **Rick and Morty – Ruth Lambert, Robert McGee**; Big Mouth – Julie Ashton-Barson; Bob's Burgers – Julie Ashton-Barson; The Boss Baby: Back in Business – Ania O'Hare; SpongeBob SquarePants – Gene Vassilaros; Trolls: The Beat Goes On! – Ania O'Hare, Ruth Lambert, Robert McGee	**Reality Series**: **Queer Eye – Gretchen Palek, Danielle Gervais, Ally Capriotti Grant, Beyhan Oguz**; Born This Way – Sasha Alpert, Megan Sleeper; Project Runway – Sasha Alpert; RuPaul's Drag Race – Ethan Petersen, Goloka Bolte; The Voice – Michelle McNulty

=== Short-Form Projects ===
**Short Film**: **The Lost – Matthew Lessall**; Akeda – Becky Silverman, Lisa Zambetti; Emergency – Amanda Lenker Doyle, Chrissy Fiorilli-Ellington; Lucy in the Sky – Jen Rudin; The Zim – Jessica Sherman	**Short Form Series**: **Relationship Status – Meg Morman, Sunday Boling**; I Love Bekka & Lucy – Angela Terry Barbara Stordahl, Lisa Bourne; Overdue – Sherrie Henderson; Associate: Vanessa Knight; The Off Season – Shayna Sherwood, Nickole Doro; Zac & Mia – Amanda Lenker Doyle, Chrissy Fiorilli-Ellington

=== Theatre ===
**New York Broadway Theatre – Comedy or Drama**: **Harry Potter and the Cursed Child – Jim Carnahan Junk, David Caparelliotis, Lauren Port**; 1984 – Jim Carnahan; Associate: Jillian Cimini; Meteor Shower – David Caparelliotis, Lauren Port; The Parisian Woman – Will Cantler, Karyn Casl, Adam Caldwell	**New York Broadway Theatre – Musical**: **Mean Girls – Bethany Knox**; Escape to Margaritaville – Rachel Hoffman; Frozen – Bernard Telsey, Rachel Hoffman, Cesar A. Rocha; Prince of Broadway – Tara Rubin, Kaitlin Shaw; Summer: The Donna Summer Musical – Tara Rubin; Associate: Felicia Rudolph
**New York Broadway Theatre – Revival, Comedy or Drama**: **Angels in America – Jim Carnahan**; The Boys in the Band – David Caparelliotis; Children of a Lesser God – Will Cantler, Karyn Casl, Adam Caldwell, Bernard Telsey; Lobby Hero – Will Cantler, Karyn Casl, Adam Caldwell; M. Butterfly – Adam Caldwell, Will Cantler, Karyn Casl	**New York Broadway Theatre – Revival, Musical**: **Once on This Island – Craig Burns**; Carousel – Bernard Telsey, Craig Burns; My Fair Lady – Bernard Telsey; Associate: Craig A. Rocha
**New York Theatre – Comedy or Musical**: **School Girls; Or, the African Mean Girls Play – Adam Caldwell, Will Cantler, Karyn Casl**; A Letter to Harvey Milk – Stephanie Klapper; Jerry Springer: The Opera – Rebecca Scholl, Cesar A. Rocha; Jersey Boys – Tara Rubin, Lindsay Levine, Merri Sugarman; Associate: Claire Burke; KPOP – Henry Russell Bergstein; Our Lady of 121st Street – David Caparelliotis, Lauren Port; The Sting – Tara Rubin; Associate: Felicia Rudolph	**New York Theatre – Drama**: **Jesus Hopped the 'A' Train – David Caparelliotis, Lauren Port**; Animal – Lauren Port; At Home at the Zoo – David Caparelliotis, Lauren Port; Hangman – Will Cantler, Karyn Casl, Adam Caldwell; Transfers – Adam Caldwell, Will Cantler, Karyn Casl
**Regional Theatre**: **Angels in America – Tara Rubin, Laura Schutzel; Location Casting: Amy Potozkin**; 12 Angry Men – Michael Donovan; Associate: Richie Ferris; Actually – Will Cantler, Karyn Casl, Adam Caldwell; The Cake – Karyn Casl; The Graduate – Michael Donovan; Associate: Richie Ferris	**Los Angeles Theatre**: **Henry IV – Tracy Lilienfield; Associate: Emily Towler**; Belleville – Ryan Bernard Tymensky; Our Town – Tiffany Little Canfield; Associate: Ryan Bernard Tymensky; The Pride – Eric Souliere; Significant Other – Phyllis Schuringa
**Special Theatrical Performance**: **Mamma Mia! – Margery Simkin, Michael Donovan; Associate: Richie Ferris**; Assassins – Carrie Gardner, Stephen Kopel; Candide – Rachel Hoffman; In the Heights – Bethany Knox, Rebecca Scholl; West Side Story In Concert – Stephanie Klapper	**Theatre Tours**: **Hamilton – Bethany Knox**; Bright Star – James Calleri, Paul Davis, Michael Donovan, Howie Cherpakov; Associate: Richie Ferris; The Color Purple – Rebecca Scholl; The Humans – Carrie Gardner; School of Rock – Tara Rubin, Merri Sugarman; Associate: Claire Burke; Waitress – Patrick Goodwin

=== Lynn Stalmaster Award ===
- **Laura Dern**

=== Marion Dougherty New York Apple Award ===
- **Tina Fey**
- **Jeff Raymond**

=== Hoyt Bowers Award ===
- **Robert J. Ulrich**
- **Eric Dawson**
- **Carol Kritzer**

=== Honorary Awards ===
- **Mike Fenton**
- **Joe Reich**
- **Al Onorato**
