= Juliet Taylor =

American casting director

- Born: Juliet Sewell Taylor
- Education: Smith College
- Occupation: Independent casting director
- Years active: 1973 - present
- Spouse: James E. Walsh (m. 1976)
- Awards: Emmy Award (Outstanding Casting for Angels in America)

Juliet Taylor is an American casting director. A six-time Casting Society of America award winner, she has cast more than 100 movies, including 43 of Woody Allen's films. In November 2024, she received the Academy Honorary Award for lifetime achievement in film.

== Early life and education ==
Taylor grew up in Greenwich, Connecticut, and attended Miss Porter's School and Smith College, where she majored in drama.

== Career ==
Taylor moved to New York following her graduation, and through a connection at Smith, she was hired as a receptionist for David Merrick, a theater producer. A year later she began working for casting director Marion Dougherty, who became her mentor. In 1973, Dougherty left casting to become a producer, and Taylor ran the company until 1977, when she was named director of East Coast casting for Paramount Pictures. In 1978 she began to cast films independently. Her first solo casting credit was for The Exorcist. In 1979, in a feature story titled "The Casting Director," New York Magazine wrote: "It is commonly conceded within the film industry that Juliet Taylor is the best and by far the most important of the casting directors."

In addition to casting films including Taxi Driver, Sleepless in Seattle and Schindler's List, Taylor has cast 43 Woody Allen movies, beginning with 1975's Love and Death. He credits her with introducing him to Jeff Daniels, Mary Beth Hurt, Patricia Clarkson, Mariel Hemingway, Dianne Wiest, Meryl Streep, Joaquin Phoenix, and Parker Posey, among others.

Taylor was featured in the 2013 HBO documentary, Casting By. She was awarded the Smith College Medal in 1990. She received the Academy Honorary Award for Lifetime Achievement in November 2024. She was the second casting director to receive the award, which was presented to her by Nicole Kidman.

== Filmography ==
=== Film ===
Year	Project	Director	Ref.
1973	The Exorcist	William Friedkin	
1975	Love and Death	Woody Allen	
1975	The Stepford Wives	Bryan Forbes	
1975	The Happy Hooker	Nicholas Sgarro	
1976	The Front	Martin Ritt	
1976	Marathon Man	John Schlesinger	
1976	Network	Sidney Lumet	
1976	Next Stop, Greenwich Village	Paul Mazursky	
1976	Taxi Driver	Martin Scorsese	
1977	Annie Hall	Woody Allen	
1977	Between the Lines	Joan Micklin Silver	
1977	Close Encounters of the Third Kind	Steven Spielberg	
1977	The Great Bank Hoax	Joseph Jacoby	
1977	Julia	Fred Zinnemann	
1977	The Turning Point	Herbert Ross	
1977	Thieves	John Berry	
1978	Interiors	Woody Allen	
1978	Pretty Baby	Louis Malle	
1978	Oliver's Story	John Korty	
1979	Manhattan	Woody Allen	
1979	Starting Over	Alan J. Pakula	
1980	Stardust Memories	Woody Allen	
1981	Arthur	Steve Gordon	
1981	Fort Apache, the Bronx	Daniel Petrie	
1981	Honky Tonk Freeway	John Schlesinger	
1981	Rollover	Alan J. Pakula	
1982	A Midsummer Night's Sex Comedy	Woody Allen	
1982	Shoot the Moon	Alan Parker	
1982	Still of the Night	Robert Benton	
1982	Tempest	Paul Mazursky	
1983	Terms of Endearment	James L. Brooks	
1983	Zelig	Woody Allen	
1984	Birdy	Alan Parker	
1984	Broadway Danny Rose	Woody Allen	
1984	Crackers	Louis Malle	
1984	Falling in Love	Ulu Grosbard	
1984	The Killing Fields	Roland Joffe	
1984	Misunderstood	Jerry Schatzberg	
1985	Alamo Bay	Louis Malle	
1986	Hannah and Her Sisters	Woody Allen	
1986	Heartburn	Mike Nichols	
1986	The Manhattan Project	Marshall Brickman	
1986	The Mission	Roland Joffe	
1987	Radio Days	Woody Allen	
1987	September	Woody Allen	
1988	Another Woman	Woody Allen	
1988	Big	Penny Marshall	
1988	Biloxi Blues	Mike Nichols	
1988	Dangerous Liaisons	Stephen Frears	
1988	Mississippi Burning	Alan Parker	
1988	Working Girl	Mike Nichols	
1989	Crimes and Misdemeanors	Woody Allen	
1989	New York Stories	Woody Allen / Scorsese / Coppola	
1990	Alice	Woody Allen	
1990	The Grifters	Stephen Frears	
1990	Postcards from the Edge	Mike Nichols	
1990	The Sheltering Sky	Bernardo Bertolucci	
1991	Regarding Henry	Mike Nichols	
1991	Shadows and Fog	Woody Allen	
1992	Husbands and Wives	Woody Allen	
1992	Hero	Stephen Frears	
1992	This Is My Life	Nora Ephron	
1993	Manhattan Murder Mystery	Woody Allen	
1993	Schindler's List	Steven Spielberg	
1993	Sleepless in Seattle	Nora Ephron	
1994	Angie	Martha Coolidge	
1994	Bullets over Broadway	Woody Allen	
1994	Interview with the Vampire	Neil Jordan	
1994	Mixed Nuts	Nora Ephron	
1994	The Road to Welville	Alan Parker	
1994	Wolf	Mike Nichols	
1995	Mighty Aphrodite	Woody Allen	
1996	The Birdcage	Mike Nichols	
1996	Everyone Says I Love You	Woody Allen	
1996	Mary Reilly	Stephen Frears	
1997	Deconstructing Harry	Woody Allen	
1998	Celebrity	Woody Allen	
1998	Meet Joe Black	Martin Brest	
1998	Primary Colors	Mike Nichols	
1999	Angela's Ashes	Alan Parker	
1999	Sweet and Lowdown	Woody Allen	
2000	Small Time Crooks	Woody Allen	
2001	The Curse of the Jade Scorpion	Woody Allen	
2002	Hollywood Ending	Woody Allen	
2002	People I Know	Daniel Algrant	
2003	Anything Else	Woody Allen	
2003	The Life of David Gale	Alan Parker	
2004	Marie and Bruce	Tom Cairns	
2004	Melinda and Melinda	Woody Allen	
2004	The Stepford Wives	Frank Oz	
2005	The Interpreter	Sydney Pollack	
2005	Match Point	Woody Allen	
2006	Scoop	Woody Allen	
2007	Cassandra's Dream	Woody Allen	
2008	Vicky Cristina Barcelona	Woody Allen	
2009	Whatever Works	Woody Allen	
2010	You Will Meet a Tall Dark Stranger	Woody Allen	
2011	Midnight in Paris	Woody Allen	
2012	To Rome with Love	Woody Allen	
2013	Blue Jasmine	Woody Allen	
2014	Magic in the Moonlight	Woody Allen	
2015	Irrational Man	Woody Allen	
2016	Cafe Society	Woody Allen	

=== Television ===
Year	Project	Director	Notes	Ref.
1994	Don't Drink the Water	Woody Allen	ABC television film	
2001	Wit	Mike Nichols	HBO television film	
2003	Angels in America	Mike Nichols	HBO miniseries	

== Awards and nominations ==
=== Oscar, Emmy, Gotham Independent and New York Women in Film awards ===
Year	Association	Category	Nominated work	Result	Ref.
2024	Academy Award	Academy Honorary Award	Lifetime Achievement	Won	
2001	Primetime Emmy Awards	Outstanding Casting for a Miniseries, Movie or a Special	Wit (with Ellen Lewis, Leo Davis)	Nominated	
2004	Primetime Emmy Awards	Outstanding Casting for a Miniseries, Movie or a Special	Angels in America (with Ellen Lewis)	Won	
1995	Gotham Independent Film Awards	Independent Film Tribute Award		Honored	
1996	New York Women in Film Awards	Muse Award		Honored	
2001	Women in Film Crystal Awards	Crystal Award		Won	

=== Casting Society of America Awards ===
1985	Best Casting for Feature Film, Comedy	The Purple Rose of Cairo	Nominated
1986	Best Casting for Feature Film, Comedy	Hannah and Her Sisters	Won
1987	Best Casting for Feature Film, Comedy	Radio Days	Nominated
1988	Best Casting for Feature Film, Drama	Mississippi Burning	Won
1988	Best Casting for Feature Film, Comedy	Working Girl	Nominated
1988	Best Casting for Feature Film, Comedy	Big	Nominated
1990	Best Casting for Feature Film, Comedy	Postcards from the Edge	Nominated
1990	Best Casting for Feature Film, Comedy	Alice	Nominated
1990	Best Casting for Feature Film, Drama	The Grifters	Nominated
1992	Best Casting for Feature Film, Comedy	Husbands and Wives	Nominated
1992	Best Casting for Feature Film, Comedy	This Is My Life	Nominated
1993	Best Casting for Feature Film, Comedy	Sleepless in Seattle	Won
1994	Best Casting for Feature Film, Comedy	Angie	Nominated
1994	Best Casting for Feature Film, Comedy	Bullets Over Broadway	Won
1995	Best Casting for Feature Film, Comedy	Mighty Aphrodite	Nominated
1996	Best Casting for Feature Film, Comedy	The Birdcage	Nominated
1997	Best Casting for Feature Film, Comedy	Everyone Says I Love You	Nominated
1998	Best Casting for Feature Film, Comedy	Primary Colors	Nominated
1999	Best Casting for Feature Film, Comedy	Celebrity	Nominated
1997	As casting director, 1997	Hoyt Bowers Award	Won
2006	As casting director, 2006	Golden Apple Award	Won
2013	Best Casting for Feature Film, Comedy	Blue Jasmine	Nominated
2016	Best Casting for Feature Film, Comedy	Café Society	Nominated
