= Russell Boast =

South African and American casting director

- Born: 1972 (age 52–53); Durban, South Africa
- Occupation(s): Casting Director, Producer, Professor
- Years active: 2006–present

Russell Boast (born 1972) is a South African and American casting director for film and television.

== Life and career ==
Boast was born in Durban, South Africa. He graduated from the University of South Africa and Durban University of Technology (DUT) in 1994. He started his career as a casting assistant on the film, Beyond Borders. Boast moved to Los Angeles in 2004. He is the former president of Casting Society of America. He is also a professor and the head of casting at Chapman University.

== Filmography ==
- Oliver Outloud (2023)
- Student Body (2022)
- Nash Bridges (2021)
- The Little Drummer Boy (2021)
- Kill the Butterfly (2021)
- I'm Not Him (2021)
- Pooling to Paradise (2021)
- Forever Alone (2020)
- The Penitent Thief (2020)
- Juliet (2020)
- No Ordinary Man (2020)
- Gossamer Folds (2020)
- Household Demons (2020)
- Algorithm: BLISS (2020)
- Palomino & Swissy (2019)
- The Hypnotist's Love Story (2019)
- Extra Innings (2019)
- Dark/Web (2019)
- The Fix (2019)
- Proven Innocent (2019)
- Miller & Son (2019)
- Killing Karen Soloway (2018)
- Insatiable (2018)
- The Desecrated (2018)
- The Plural of Blood (2017)
- Chance (2017)
- Crowning Jules (2017)
- Your Own Road (2017)
- Mars Project (2016)
- Paradise Club (2016)
- The Tribe (2016)
- Wicked City (2015)
- Damsel (2015)
- Home Run Showdown (2015)
- Just Brett and Lilly (2015)
- The Time We're In (2015)
- Oishi High School Battle (2012)
- To the Moon (2012)
- From the Head (2011)
- Serving Up Richard (2011)
- White Irish Drinkers (2010)
- A Little Help (2010)
- The Whole Truth (2009)
- Spoken Word (2009)
- Hansie (2008)
- The Trail (2006)

== Awards and nominations ==
Year	Result	Award	Category	Work	Ref.
2020	Nominated	Casting Society of America	Outstanding Achievement in Casting - Short Film	Miller & Son	
2012	Nominated	NAACP Theatre Awards	Best Producer – Local	Treat Yourself Like Cary Grant	
