= Mindy Marin =

American film producer

- Born: February 15, 1960 (age 66); Greenwich, Connecticut, US
- Occupations: Casting director, Producer, Author
- Years active: 1978–present

Mindy Marin (born February 15, 1960, in Greenwich, Connecticut) is a casting director, producer and writer based in Santa Monica, California.

== Casting ==
Marin is predominantly known for her casting in film and television. This career path began at Paramount Television in 1978 as a casting assistant for Taxi. Subsequently she worked at Warner Bros. for four years, ultimately becoming the Manager of Talent and Casting. In 1989 Marin left to establish her own company, Casting Artists, Inc. She has cast 70 films including Cliffhanger, Clear and Present Danger, Face/Off, Juno, and Thank You for Smoking, which she also co-produced. She has been nominated for four Artios awards and one Emmy.

== Producing ==
In 1991, Marin founded the production company Bluewater Ranch Entertainment and in 1996 the film 2 Days in the Valley was released, marking her first production working as an associate producer. She has also been an associate producer on The Deep End, a co-producer on Thank You for Smoking, The Family Stone, and The Alibi, and an executive producer on Night at the Golden Eagle.

== Writing ==
In addition to Bluewater Ranch Entertainment, Marin founded Bluewater Ranch Books in 1991. She wrote The Secret to Tender Pie, a book containing favorite recipes of grandmothers from across the country, including her own. It is in this book that her grandmother—Bessie Cecil—included her secret apple pie recipe. Published by Random House Value Publishing in 1998, it debuted on the Los Angeles Times Bestseller List and received positive reviews from nationwide media.

== Filmography (casting) ==
=== Films ===
- Betrayed (1988)
- Bad Dreams (1988)
- Next of Kin (1989)
- Miss Firecracker (1989)
- The First Power (1990)
- Chattahoochee (1990)
- The Naked Gun 2½: The Smell of Fear (1991)
- Talent for the Game (1991)
- Necessary Roughness (1991)
- L.A. Story (1991)
- Flight of the Intruder (1991)
- So I Married An Axe Murderer (1993)
- Cliffhanger (1993)
- Clear and Present Danger (1994)
- Clean Slate (1994)
- The Net (1995)
- Cutthroat Island (1995)
- 2 Days in the Valley (1996)
- The Postman (1997)
- Face/Off (1997)
- Anaconda (1997)
- Soldier (1998)
- Dangerous Beauty (1998)
- The General's Daughter (1999)
- Mystery Men (1999)
- Crazy in Alabama (1999)
- My Dog Skip (2000)
- Lost Souls (2000)
- Chain of Fools (2000)
- The Deep End (2001)
- Night at the Golden Eagle (2001)
- 15 Minutes (2001)
- Windtalkers (2002)
- Time Machine (2002)
- The Touch (2002)
- The Sum of All Fears (2002)
- The First $20 Million Is Always the Hardest (2002)
- Swimfan (2002)
- Paycheck (2003)
- Open Range (2003)
- Bulletproof Monk (2003)
- Dirty Dancing: Havana Nights (2004)
- Alfie (2004)
- The Family Stone (2005)
- Revolver (2005)
- Lord of War (2005)
- Bee Season (2005)
- The Nativity Story (2006)
- The Covenant (2006)
- Thank You for Smoking (2006)
- Snakes on a Plane (2006)
- Lies & Alibis (2006)
- Flicka (2006)
- Eragon (2006)
- Whatever Lola Wants (2007)
- Mr. Brooks (2007)
- Alvin and the Chipmunks (2007)
- Aliens vs. Predator: Requiem (2008)
- Juno (2007)
- Wanted (2008)
- The X-Files: I Want to Believe (2008)
- Max Payne (2008)
- The Day the Earth Stood Still (2008)
- Repossession Mambo (2009)
- 9 (2009)
- Jennifer's Body (2009)
- Tooth Fairy (2010)
- Up in the Air (2009)
- The Book of Eli (2010)
- Drive (2011)
- Crazy, Stupid, Love (2011)
- Abraham Lincoln: Vampire Hunter (2012)
- Jack Reacher (2012)
- The Hangover Part III (2013)
- Into The Storm (2014)
- Mission: Impossible - Rogue Nation (2015)
- Mission: Impossible – Fallout (2018)
- Mission: Impossible - Dead Reckoning Part One (2023)

=== Television ===
- Shadow Chasers (1985)
- Maggie (1986)
- Head of the Class (1986)
- Ohara (1987)
- A Deadly Silence (1989)
- In Living Color (1990–1991)
- The Astronomer (1991)
- Peacemaker (1991)
- Our Sons (1991)
- Open Window (1991)
- Kingfish: A Story of Huey P. Long (1995)
- Nash Bridges (1995–2001)
- If These Walls Could Talk (1996)
- When Trumpets Fade (1998)
- Tuesdays with Morrie (1999)
- Holiday Heart (2000)
- Path to War (2002)

== Filmography (producer) ==
=== Films ===
- 2 Days in the Valley Associate Producer (1996)
- The Deep End Associate Producer (2001)
- Night at the Golden Eagle Executive Producer (2001)
- Lies & Alibis Co-Producer (2006)
- The Family Stone Co-Producer (2005)
- Thank You for Smoking Co-Producer (2006)
