= Ellen Lewis =

American casting director

- Born: Chicago, Illinois, U.S.
- Education: School of the Art Institute of Chicago; Columbia University
- Alma mater: Francis W. Parker School
- Occupation: Independent casting director
- Years active: 1983 - present
- Awards: Emmy Award for Outstanding Casting (2004, 2011 and 2021); Hoyt Bowers Award (2015)

Ellen Lewis is an American casting director. Her credits include The Queen's Gambit, The Devil Wears Prada, A League of Their Own, Forrest Gump and Martin Scorsese's New York Stories, Goodfellas, Casino, The Departed, The Wolf of Wall Street and The Irishman.

== Early life and career ==
A native of Chicago, Illinois, Lewis is the youngest of three children born to Audrey and Norman Lewis. After graduating from the Francis W. Parker School, she briefly attended the School of the Art Institute of Chicago and Columbia University.

Lewis began her casting career working as an assistant for Juliet Taylor. She helped to cast films including Hannah and Her Sisters and Working Girl before she began working independently in 1989. She has worked extensively with Scorsese since then; her second solo casting credit was for Goodfellas. A three-time Emmy Award winner (for her work on Boardwalk Empire: Season 1, Angels in America and The Queen's Gambit) and seven-time nominee, she has won three Casting Society of America Artios Awards. She received its Hoyt Bowers Award in 2015, which honors a casting professional who has elevated the profession.
