= Nancy Bishop =

American casting director

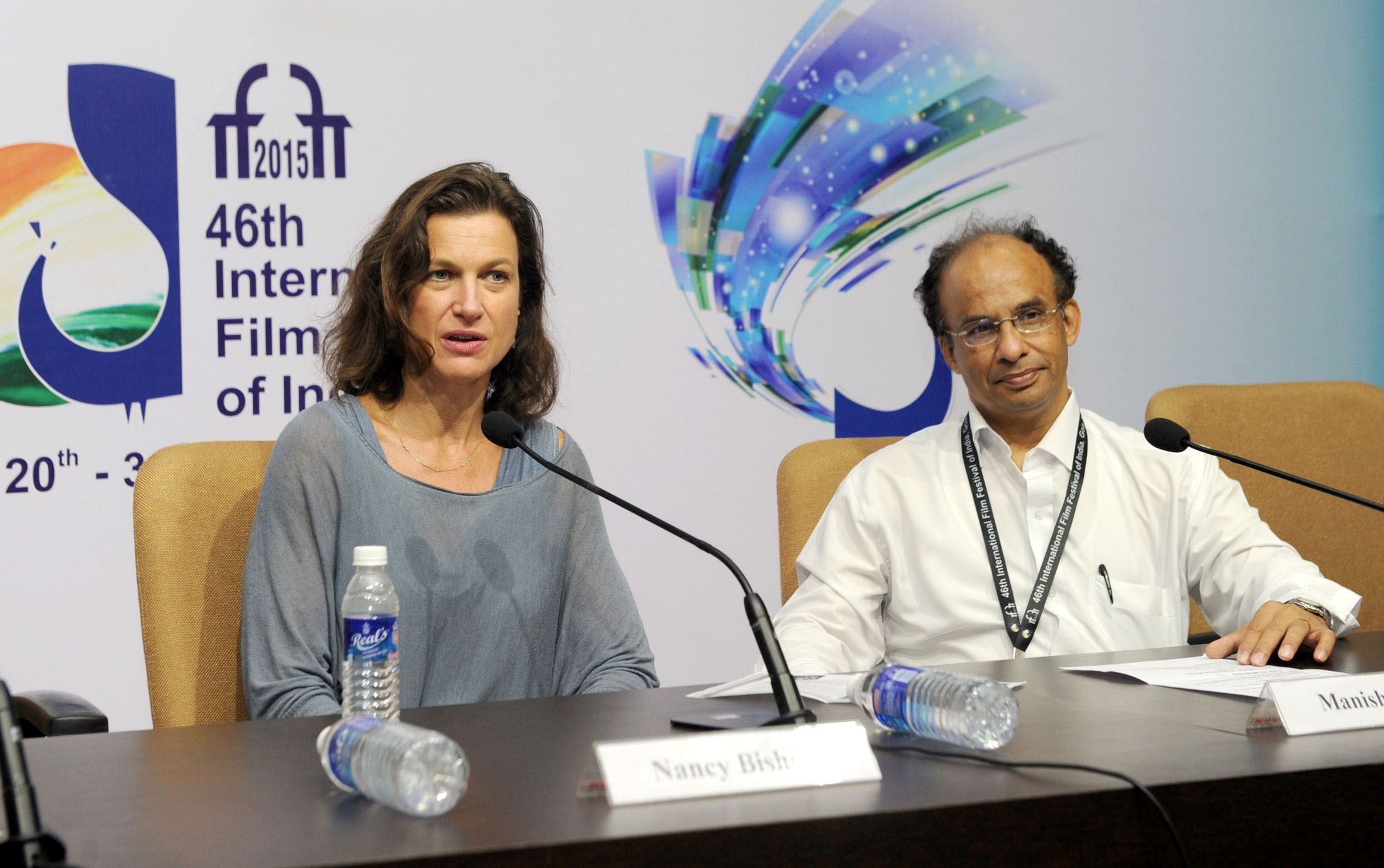
- Nancy Bishop at IFFI 2015
- Citizenship: U.S.
- Occupation: Casting director
- Website: nancybishopcasting.com nancybishopcoaching.com

Nancy Bishop is an American casting director, who works internationally from offices in London, United Kingdom and Prague, Czech Republic.

== Life and career ==
A graduate of the University of Michigan and Northwestern University, she worked as a theatre director in Chicago before moving to Prague in the 1990s to direct a play with the Black Box Theatre company and later became the artistic director of the company. When large scale film productions started to shoot in Prague, Nancy developed a casting career and is known as a specialist in European and especially Slavic talent. Studio credits include European casting on Mission Impossible – Ghost Protocol (2011), Bourne Identity (2002), Hellboy (2004) and Snowpiercer (2013), and she has also worked with directors such as Roman Polanski, Peter Greenaway, Neil Burger, and Michael Apted. TV credits include SyFy’s Dune (2000), 12 Monkeys (2015-) and Blood Drive (2017-). She is a national board member at the Casting Society of America, as well as Chairman of the London branch of CSA. Also a recognized acting coach, she founded the Acting for Film program at the Prague Film School, and teaches classes internationally. She has penned two books about acting for Bloomsbury Press: Secrets from the Casting Couch and Auditioning for Film and TV. She is a member of BAFTA, the International Casting Directors Network, and The European Film Academy.
