= Jeanne McCarthy =

American casting director

- Occupation: Casting director

Jeanne McCarthy is an American casting director. She has been nominated for six Primetime Emmy Awards in the category Outstanding Casting, winning for her work on the anthology television series American Crime Story first season The People v. O. J. Simpson: American Crime Story.

In 2014 McCarthy was one of five people named by Vanity Fair as casting directors who deserved to be nominated for an Academy Award, if there was an award for that category. She worked for the 2014 film Foxcatcher. McCarthy was awarded the Independent Spirit Robert Altman Award at the 24th Independent Spirit Awards for the film Synecdoche, New York, along with the director and cast of the film.
