= Ellen Chenoweth =

American casting director

Ellen Chenoweth is an American casting director. For her second film, Barry Levinson's Diner, she cast many then relatively unknown actors including Steve Guttenberg, Daniel Stern, Mickey Rourke, Kevin Bacon, Tim Daly, Paul Reiser, and Ellen Barkin. A year later, she helped cast the film Terms of Endearment.

In the late 1970s, Chenoweth was an office manager for the Actors Studio. She helped discover an unknown theater actor named Mickey Rourke for the 1980 television film City in Fear. In the 1980s, Chenoweth was the casting director for The Natural, Down and Out in Beverly Hills, Ruthless People, and Broadcast News. She was also the casting director for O Brother, Where Art Thou?, Good Night, and Good Luck, No Country for Old Men, Doubt, Michael Clayton, True Grit, Burn After Reading, Men in Black 3, Bugsy and The Bourne Legacy.
