= Debra Zane =

American casting director

Debra Zane is a casting director, based in Los Angeles, California, known for her work in film and television. Zane has worked with some of the most successful directors in the world such as Steven Spielberg, Ridley Scott, and Steven Soderbergh.

She has been nominated for fourteen Artios Awards, and has won three. In 2004, she won the Hollywood Film Festival award for "Best Casting Director of the Year."

== Credits ==
=== Film casting director ===
- The Hunger Games (2012)
- The Twilight Saga: Breaking Dawn – Part 1 (2011)
- Rise of the Planet of the Apes (2011)
- Battle: Los Angeles (2011)
- Devil (2010)
- X-Men Origins: Wolverine (2009)
- Revolutionary Road (2008)
- Indiana Jones and the Kingdom of the Crystal Skull (2008)
- Ocean's Thirteen (2007)
- Dreamgirls (2006)
- The Good German (2006)
- War of the Worlds (2005)
- Kingdom of Heaven (2005)
- Jarhead (2005)
- Fun with Dick and Jane (2005)
- Ocean's Twelve (2004)
- Matchstick Men (2003)
- Catch Me If You Can (2002)
- Solaris (2002)
- Ocean's Eleven (2001)
- Traffic (2000)
- American Beauty (1999)
- Galaxy Quest (1999)
- Fear (1996)

=== TV casting director ===
- Tracey Takes On... (1996-1997)
- Bloodline (2015–present)
- Good Behavior (2016–2017)

== Awards and nominations ==
Artios awards:

- Nominated, 2009, Outstanding Achievement in Casting - Feature - Studio or Independent Drama/Comedy for: Revolutionary Road (shared with Ellen Lewis)
- Nominated, 2009, Outstanding Achievement in Casting - Animation Feature for: The Tale of Despereaux
- Won, 2007, Best Feature Film Casting - Drama for: Dreamgirls (shared with Jay Binder)
- Nominated, 2004, Best Casting for Feature Film, Drama for: Seabiscuit
- Nominated, 2002, Best Casting for Feature Film, Drama for: Road to Perdition
- Won, 2001, Best Casting for Feature Film, Drama for: Traffic
- Won, 2000, Best Casting for Feature Film, Drama for: American Beauty
- Nominated, 2000, Best Casting for Feature Film, Drama for: Galaxy Quest
- Nominated, 1999, Best Casting for TV, Comedy Episodic: Maximum Bob (shared with David Rubin)
- Nominated, 1999, Best Casting for TV, Comedy Pilot for: Maximum Bob (shared with David Rubin)
- Nominated, 1998, Best Casting for Feature Film, Comedy for: Wag the Dog (shared with Ellen Chenoweth)
- Nominated, 1996, Best Casting for Feature Film, Comedy for: Get Shorty (shared with David Rubin)
