= Douglas Aibel =

American casting director

- Occupations: Artistic Director, Theatrical producer, and casting director
- Years active: 1985 - present
- Awards: Obie, Drama Desk, Lucille Lortel, Artios, Independent Spirit Robert Altman

Douglas Aibel is an American theatrical producer and film casting director. He is an Artistic Director for Vineyard Theatre. He has frequently collaborated with M. Night Shyamalan, Wes Anderson, James Gray and Noah Baumbach.

== Career ==
Aibel began his work in theatre in 1982, joining Vineyard Theatre as an associate director and becoming Artistic Director in 1985. His producing credits with Vineyard include How I Learned to Drive, Three Tall Women, Avenue Q, The Scottsboro Boys, The Lyons, Indecent (play), Lady Day at Emerson's Bar and Grill and Gloria (play).

Aibel is also active as a casting director in both television and film. His credits in film include Marriage Story, The Grand Budapest Hotel, Manchester by the Sea, Unbreakable, Dead Man Walking, Armageddon Time, Split, Frances Ha, Little Odessa, 99 Homes, and Moonrise Kingdom. His television credits include Succession, Mozart in the Jungle, Servant, Outer Range, The Devil All the Time (film), Reality (2023 film), and The Staircase.

He has received an Obie Award for his work with Vineyard Theatre, in addition to accepting a special Drama Desk Award and Lucille Lortel Awards for Vineyard Theatre's body of work. For his casting work, he has received Artios Awards, the Independent Spirit Robert Altman Award, and he has been nominated for a British Academy Film Awards and an Emmy Awards.

== Education ==
He is a graduate of Vassar college.
