= Fiona Weir =

British casting director

Fiona Weir is a British casting director. In 2006, she received a Primetime Emmy nomination for the television film The Girl in the Café, directed by David Yates with whom she worked on the Harry Potter film franchise, her most notable credit.

Other works include Love Actually (2003), Boy A (2007), The Golden Compass (2007), The Boat That Rocked (2009), and Fantastic Beasts and Where to Find Them (2016).

== Awards and nominations ==
- 2006 – Primetime Emmy Award, Nominated, Outstanding Casting for a Miniseries, Movie or a Special – For The Girl in the Café (2005)
- 2014 – 30th Artios Awards, Nominated, Outstanding Achievement in Casting – Feature Film Studio or Independent Comedy – For Pride (2014)
