= Bernard Telsey =

Casting director

Bernard Telsey (born February 8, 1960) is an American casting director and co-founder of MCC Theater.

In the 1980s, Telsey began working for Simon & Kumin Casting as an assistant, then a casting director at Risa Bramon & Billy Hopkins Casting.

- Shows his company has cast include Broadway: Rent, Wicked, In the Heights, South Pacific, Hairspray, Rock of Ages, Equus, Legally Blonde, A Catered Affair, The Homecoming, Talk Radio, November, Grey Gardens, The Color Purple, The Rocky Horror Show, All Shook Up, Tarzan, and Sweeney Todd: The Demon Barber of Fleet Street, Off-Broadway shows include: Reasons to Be Pretty, 50 Words, Almost an Evening, and De La Guarda.
- Telsey has cast for several theatre companies including the Atlantic Theatre Company, Signature Theatre, Westport Country Playhouse, New York Theatre Workshop, Drama Dept, ACT in San Francisco, La Jolla Playhouse, McCarter Theatre, Long Wharf Theatre, Hartford Stage, and Goodman Theatre.
- Films cast include Rachel Getting Married, Sex and the City, Margin Call, Across the Universe, Dan in Real Life, Pieces of April, Rent.

Rent established Telsey as someone who casts unconventional shows, which got him assigned to cast The Capeman.
