= Avy Kaufman =

American film and television casting director

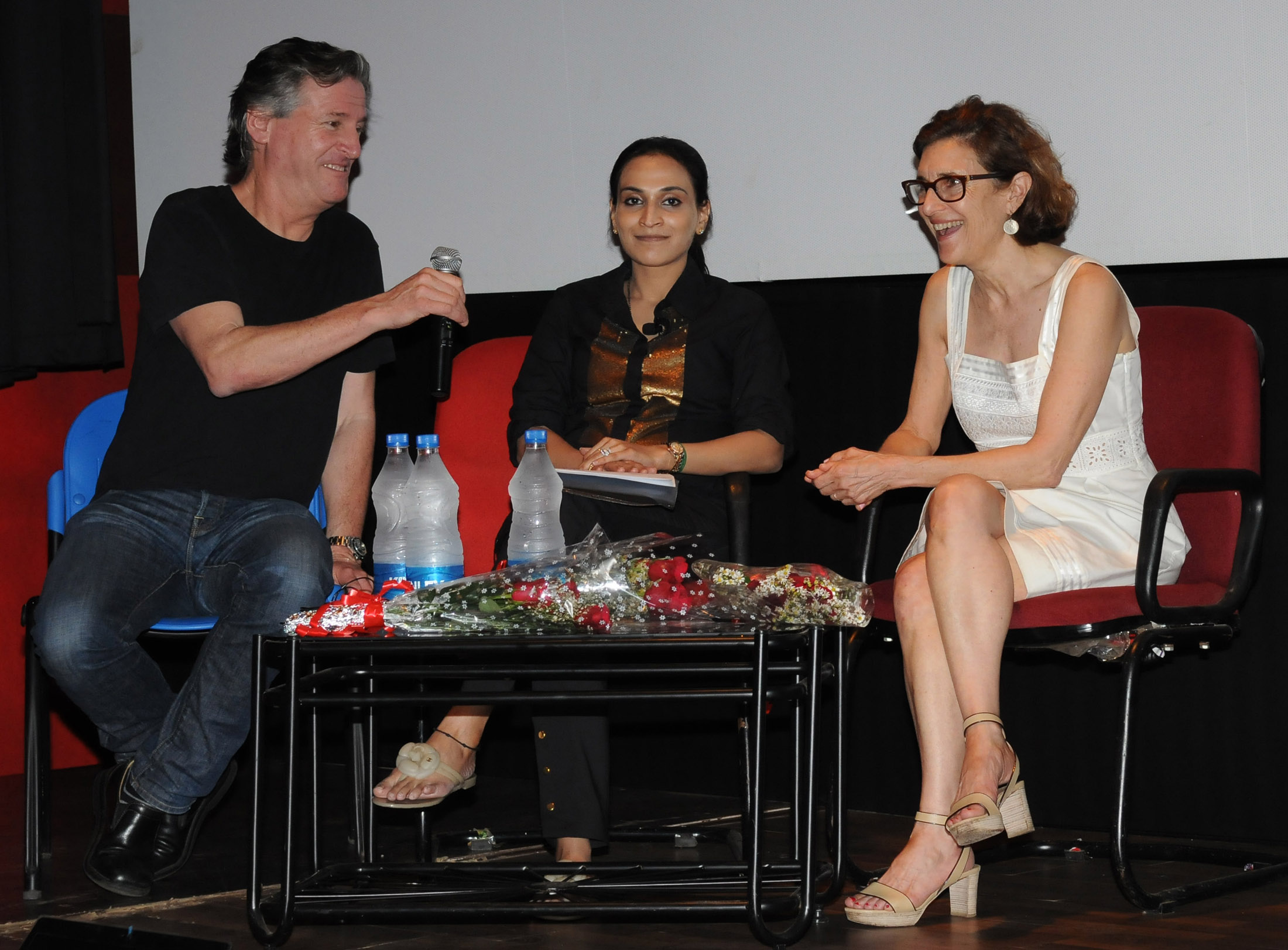
- Avy Kaufman (right), Aishwarya Rajinikanth (center), David Womark (left), at IFFI 2012
- Occupation: Casting director

Avy Kaufman is an American casting director for film and television.

== Early life ==
Kaufman is from Atlanta. She relocated to New York City in 1976 to study ballet.

== Career ==
Kaufman originally worked in casting for advertising at Foote, Cone & Belding, often print ads, for six years, then transitioned to feature films.

Kaufman initially did not succeed at becoming a casting director for film and worked at casting extras. Eventually director John Sayles came across her doing location casting and hired her to cast his film Matewan. Jodie Foster then hired her to cast Little Man Tate. She later met director Ang Lee, which helped to further her career.

Kaufman has cast more than 150 film and television productions and worked with directors including Steven Spielberg and Wes Craven. Her casting credits include Brokeback Mountain, Mare of Easttown, Succession, Babygirl, Tár and The Sixth Sense.

== Accolades ==
Kaufman received the 2005 Hollywood Casting Director of the Year award given by the Hollywood Film Festival.

She received a 2008 Primetime Emmy Award for Outstanding Casting for a Drama Series for her work on Damages: Season 1 and in 2020 & 2022 for Primetime Emmy Award for Outstanding Casting for a Drama Series for Succession: Seasons 2-3. She had earlier been nominated for a Primetime Emmy Award for Outstanding Casting for a Miniseries, Movie, or a Special for her work on the romance drama television miniseries Empire Falls.

Kaufman has been nominated for eighteen Artios Awards, and has won three.

== Filmography ==
Date	Title	Notes
1989	Miss Firecracker	
1991	Little Man Tate	
1991	The Super	
1993	Searching for Bobby Fischer	
1995	Home for the Holidays	
1996	Lone Star	
1997	The Ice Storm	
1998	Rounders	
1999	The Sixth Sense	
2000	State And Main	
2001	Save The Last Dance	
2001	Blow	
2003	Dogville	
2004	Garden State	
2004	Lemony Snicket's A Series Of Unfortunate Events	
2005	Brokeback Mountain	
2005	Zathura: A Space Adventure	
2006	Bonneville	
2007	My Blueberry Nights	
2007	The Bourne Ultimatum	
2007	American Gangster	
2008	Sunshine Cleaning	
2009	Taking Woodstock	
2009	Solitary Man	
2009	Leaves of Grass	
2009	Public Enemies	
2009	Brothers	
2010	Salt	
2010	Let Me In	
2011	Scream 4	
2011	The Ledge	
2011	Shame	
2012	Prometheus	
2012	Life of Pi	
2014	Before I Disappear	
2014	A Walk Among the Tombstones	
2014	The Skeleton Twins	
2015	The Salvation	
2017	Our Souls at Night	
2019	Capone	
2019	Driveways	
2020	Let Him Go	
2023	Jules	
2025	Death of a Unicorn	

=== Television ===
Date	Title	Notes
2005	Empire Falls	
2007	Gossip Girl	
2008	Damages	Pilot
2016	The Night Of	
2016	Billions	
2019-2023	Succession	
2020	High Fidelity	
2021	Mare of Easttown	
2016	The OA	
2023	A Murder at the End of the World	
2025	Dope Thief	

== See also ==
- List of people from New York City
