= Piven =

Piven ("rooster" in Ukrainian) is a surname. Notable persons with that surname include:

- Byrne Piven (1929–2002), American actor
- Frances Fox Piven (born 1932), American sociologist and political scientist
- Hanoch Piven (born 1963), Israeli artist
- Jeremy Piven (born 1965), American actor
- Joyce Piven (1930–2025), American director, teacher, and actress
- Shahar Piven (born 1995), Israeli footballer
- Shira Piven (born 1961), American director

== See also ==
Півень (значення)
