= Heretic Films =

American film production company

- Type: Private
- Industry: Film
- Founded: Pensacola, Florida, United States (2012)
- Headquarters: Park City, Utah, United States
- Key people: Co-founder: Burton Ritchie; Co-founder: Ben Galecki; Board member: Kevin Pollak; Board member: Jason Alexander
- Website: heretic.com

Heretic Films is an American film production company, based in the mountain resort town of Park City, Utah. Heretic is known for working with artists, both new and established, on their passion projects.

== History ==
Heretic Films was founded in 2012 by Burton Ritchie and Ben Galecki after a short, initial incarnation as Rather Good Film, co-founded with Daniel-Konrad Cooper. Shortly after its transition to Heretic Films, Gregory Segal joined the company along with board members Kevin Pollak and Jason Alexander. Segal left the company in October 2015.

In 2014, Heretic Films ran a successful Kickstarter campaign for the documentary Misery Loves Comedy. Misery went on to premier as a 2015 Sundance Film Festival special event and was subsequently acquired by Tribeca Film.

On July 3, 2019, founders Charles Burton Ritchie and Benjamin Gelecki were found guilty of 24 federal charges related to another synthetic drug case in Nevada, after their Virginia case was overturned.

The pair was held responsible for selling 4,000 pounds, which grossed $1.6 million, of Spice/K2 within a 24-day period in 2012.

Sentencing is scheduled for January 10, 2020 in federal court

== Filmography ==
Year	Film title	Director	Cast	Notes
2011	Tanzania: A Journey Within	Sylvia Caminer	Kristen Kenney, Venance Ndibalema	distribution
2014	Copenhagen	Mark Raso	Gethin Anthony, Frederikke Dahl Hansen	co-produced with Fidelio / Scorched Films
2014	Low Down	Jeff Preiss	John Hawkes, Elle Fanning, Glenn Close, Peter Dinklage, Flea, Lena Headey, Caleb Landry Jones	co-produced with Bona Fide Productions / Epoch Films
2014	Big Significant Things	Bryan Reisberg	Harry Lloyd, Krista Kosonen	co-produced with Uncorked Productions
2014	Misery Loves Comedy	Kevin Pollak	Tom Hanks, Kevin Smith, Jimmy Fallon, Amy Schumer, Jon Favreau, Whoopi Goldberg, Judd Apatow, Martin Short, Bobby Cannavale, Jason Reitman, Bob Saget, Janeane Garofalo	co-produced with Ashton & Becky Newhall and Barry Katz
2014	Welcome To Me	Shira Piven	Kristen Wiig, James Marsden, Tim Robbins, Joan Cusack, Jennifer Jason Leigh, Wes Bentley, Linda Cardellini	co-produced with Bron Studios / Gary Sanchez
2014	Eating Animals	Christopher Dillon Quinn		co-produced with Natalie Portman
2015	The Staremaster	Sean Linezo		co-produced with Kevin Smith

== Awards ==
Year	Film title	Award	Film festival
2011	Tanzania: A Journey Within	Best Documentary, Honorable Mention; Best Documentary; Best World Showcase; Best Documentary; Best Documentary	Buffalo Niagara Film Festival; Long Island International Film Expo; SoHo International Film Festival; SoHo International Film Festival; Albuquerque Film Festival
2014	Copenhagen	Grand Jury Award (Best Narrative Feature); Special Jury for Acting: Frederikke Dahl Hansen; Grand Jury (Best Narrative Feature); Director's Choice Award; Audience Award (Best Narrative Feature); Jury Prize (Best Narrative Feature)	Florida Film Festival; Gasparilla Film Festival; Gasparilla Film Festival; Sedona Film Festival; Slamdance Film Festival; Woods Hole Film Festival
2014	Low Down	Cinematography Award Dramatic: Christopher Blauvelt; Best Actress Elle Fanning	Sundance Film Festival; Karlovy Vary International Film Festival
2014	Big Significant Things	Audience Award: Excellence in Poster Design: Corey Holms	SXSW Film Festival
