= Piven Theatre Workshop =

Theatre company in Evanston, Illinois, US

The Piven Theatre Workshop is located in Evanston, Illinois, and was founded by Joyce and Byrne Piven. For over 30 years, it has existed both as a professional theatre company and a training center for children and adults. Famous alumni to come out of the program include Jeremy Piven, John Cusack, Aimee Garcia, Joan Cusack, Ann Cusack, Aidan Quinn, Laurel Holloman, Lili Taylor, Ann Lippert, Julian Bailey, playwright Sarah Ruhl and Kate Walsh.
