= Linda Wang =

American actress

- Born: Linda Hsien Wang 王憲苓; October 10, 19??
- Education: New York University
- Occupation: Actor
- Years active: 1982–present

Chinese name
- Traditional Chinese: 王憲苓
- Simplified Chinese: 王宪苓
- Hanyu Pinyin: Wáng Xiànlíng

Linda Hsien Wang (born 19??) is an American actress. Also known as Wáng Xiànlíng (王憲苓), she was raised in Queens, New York and has been profiled in Chinese-language media in the United States

== Early life and education ==
At seven years old, Linda Wang began modeling for Kodak film. During her first year of high school, she auditioned for the part of Field Reporter in Pushing Hands but director Ang Lee told her she was just too young for the part. They spent half an hour talking about Wang's pen and ink artwork, titled "Repeating," which at the time was being exhibited at the New York Transit Museum. Wang stated Lee also gave her valuable advice on where to study and how to continue to pursue her acting career. Three months later, Wang auditioned and was accepted to study for two years in the HB Studio's teen program in Greenwich Village. She then went on to New York University and the Lee Strasberg Theatre and Film Institute.

Wang can trace her ancestry back to Shanghai and Shandong.

== Career ==
=== Television ===
Wang worked as a Chinese script translator for David Milch on several episodes of his HBO television show Deadwood. She has since expressed regret for not standing up for her right to be credited. Milch later recommended her to one of the casting directors for Tropic Thunder; she was tried as the Chinese script translator to aid writers Justin Theroux and Etan Cohen during pre-production. When asked to return, she said she would only do so on the condition that she received screen credit for her work. Producer Eric McLeod agreed and Wang went on to work as the on-set script translator for director Ben Stiller and Chinese dialogue coach for actors including Robert Downey, Jr., Reggie Lee and Brandon Soo Hoo.

As an actress, Wang appeared in Deadwood, House M.D., 8 Simple Rules, Guiding Light, and Sports Show with Norm Macdonald. She worked on several sketch comedy skits on NBC's Late Night with Conan O'Brien, most notably as Masturbating Bear's girlfriend. Wang also appeared alongside Will Ferrell and Chris Kattan as the three Nagano Geishas on Saturday Night Live and with Tracy Morgan and Jimmy Kimmel on Jimmy Kimmel Live!

=== Film ===
Wang appeared as Contessa Dell'Oro, leader of an army of commandos who plot to destroy all human life on earth, in Blonde Squad. She acted in Low Down with John Hawkes, who she worked with on Deadwood between 2004 and 2005. Wang appeared in the 2018 film Birds of Passage, where she played the role of Fu Ling opposite Stacy Keach. The film was blocked from filming in certain locations in China due to the One-Child Policy storyline. It was instead filmed in the Philippines and on the South China Sea. She also starred with actor Ernie Rivera in Allena Rennee's Red Betta. Wang played Mrs. Wan in Martin Scorsese's Revenge of the Green Dragons. The film, based on a true story, was shot in Elmhurst, Queens. Wang attended elementary school with the real-life victims and gang members; Tina Sham, one of the murder victims, was one of her best friends. Other credits include The Violent Kind, Scarred City, Dead Air, Dark City and Brett Ratner's What Ever Happened to Mason Reese? More recently, she was in My Favorite Five and Kodak's Girls on Film.

=== Other work ===
Wang has provided extensive Chinese Mandarin voice-overs in a number of advertisements, including for Standard Federal Bank, Hepatitis B Foundation, Anti-Smoking USA, AT&T, MasterCard, Magellan, Citibank, IDT Corporation, Colgate, HOLDCOM, AIG, Honey Bunches of Oats, Ford Motor Company, USPS, Smirnoff, Western Union, San Manuel Indian Bingo and Casino, Red Rock Casino and Honda Accord. She voiced Sexy Bathhouse Girl in the 2004 video game GoldenEye: Rogue Agent. Wang is a former Miss Teen Pola Asia, Pantene Pro-V hair model, and as the first female hand model for Scrabble. She also designed several items under the Linda Wang line as a spokesperson for Soho Sportswear. She also appeared in commercials for T-Mobile with Burt Reynolds and Paris Hilton and for Costco.

Since March 1997, Wang has promoted Elizabeth Glaser Pediatric AIDS Foundation's Kids 4 Kids program. She participated in the VERB campaign, a program designed to encourage children to take the hour gained from the fall time change to be more active physically, for both Disney and Nickelodeon. She also participates in various animal protection organizations' charitable events.

Wang has performed in several stage productions, including as Rose Choy in Jerome Coopersmith's Serenade in Blue and Pocahontas in a AEA stage production of Disney Friends around the World. In 2007, she appeared in the music video "Home" for the Irish pop group Westlife.

== Personal life ==
In the summer of 2005, Wang began distributing bags called "A Bag of Smile" for the homeless in Los Angeles and Orange County as an independent outreach program. In the first 12 years of the program, more than 10,000 people have received these bags, compiled monthly. They contain a bottle of water, pair of socks, banana, nut mix, sunscreen, and toothpaste. Wang currently resides in the Los Angeles area.

== Filmography ==
=== Film ===
Year	Title	Role	Notes
1989	Full Moon in New York	High school student	
1989	The Last Aristocrats	Waitress	
1990	Dark City	Julie Honda	
2001	Birds of Passage	Fu	
2007	Fist of the Warrior	LAPD officer	
2014	Low Down	Chinese woman	
2014	Revenge of the Green Dragons	Mrs. Wan	
2014	Blonde Squad	Contessa Dell'Oro	
2016	Papa	Library woman	
2021	Bliss	Streetwalker #4	

=== Television ===
Year(s)	Title	Role	Notes
1982	Sesame Street	Mr. Hooper's Little Helper	1 episode
1985	The Equalizer	Chinese Teen (uncredited)	Episode: "China Rain"
1992	Mathnet	Lucy Chin	1 episode
1994	Dead Air	Cindy	TV movie
1995	Loving	Alden's nurse	
1997-1999	As the World Turns	Sandra Wong	
1998-1999	Another World	Lisa Woo	
2002	Sagwa, the Chinese Siamese Cat	Ming (voice)	1 episode
2005	House	Jen Ling	1 episode
2008	Secretos	Officer Maria Lee	TV miniseries
2010	Back Nine	Asia	TV movie
