= Jeff Preiss =

American film director

Jeff Preiss is an American filmmaker, cinematographer, director and producer known for the documentaries Let's Get Lost (1988) and Broken Noses (1987).

== Career ==
In 1987 Preiss began working with Rosa von Praunheim and Bruce Weber as Director of Photography on a series of short films and features. This included the documentary features Dolly, Lotte and Maria, Broken Noses and Let's Get Lost. The latter, which focused on the jazz legend Chet Baker, won the Venice Film Festival Critics Award and received an Academy Award nomination for best documentary.

Preiss collaborated for three years with Weber, then expanded his career to include directing television commercials and music videos (including music video clips for Iggy Pop, Malcolm McLaren, REM, B52s, and Mariah Carey; and commercials for Nike, L.L. Bean, and Monster.com. Preiss directed an advertisement produced by Deutsch LA for Zillow, the real estate database company.

In May 2005, Preiss co-founded Orchard, a co-operative experimental exhibition space, where he collaborated on a series of films with Andrea Fraser, Nicolás Guagnini, Christian Philipp Müller, Josiah McElheny, Moyra Davey and Anthony McCall. Works from this series have joined collections including the Museo Nacional Centro de Arte Reina Sofia, Madrid and the Museum of Modern Art, New York.

Preiss later became a founding partner of Epoch Media Group, where he executive produced the motion picture Gigantic. In 2013 Epoch produced Low Down, a biopic based on the life of jazz pianist Joe Albany, along with producers Ron Yerxa, Albert Berger, and Burton Ritchie. It was released in 2014.

Preiss is now a board member at Light Industry, a venue for film and electronic art in Brooklyn, New York. He was also a board member of The Collective for Living Cinema.

== Personal life ==
Preiss is separated from his wife, the painter R. H. Quaytman. They have a son.

Preiss currently resides in New York.
