= Big Significant Things =

- Directed by: Bryan Reisberg
- Written by: Bryan Reisberg
- Produced by: Daniel-Konrad Cooper; Andrew Corkin
- Starring: Harry Lloyd; Krista Kosonen
- Cinematography: Luca Del Puppo
- Edited by: D.C. Marcial
- Music by: Mark Orton
- Production companies: Uncorked Productions; Heretic Films; Rather Good Films Ltd
- Distributed by: Oscilloscope
- Release dates: March 8, 2014 (South by Southwest); July 24, 2015 (United States)
- Running time: 85 minutes
- Country: United States
- Language: English

Big Significant Things is a 2014 American comedy-drama film written and directed by Bryan Reisberg and starring Harry Lloyd and Krista Kosonen. It is Reisberg's directorial debut.

== Cast ==
- Harry Lloyd as Craig Harrison
- Krista Kosonen as Ella
- Sylvia Grace Crim as Grace
- James Ricker II as Travis
- Travis Koop as Grant
- Elisabeth Gray as Allison (voice)
- Bess Baria as Sam
- Kaitlynn Alford as Nicky
- Samuel Foreman as Constantine
- William Foreman as John
- Peter Cameron as Joel (voice)

== Reception ==
The film has a 20% rating on Rotten Tomatoes. Glenn Kenny of RogerEbert.com awarded the film two stars. Carson Lund of Slant Magazine gave it one and a half stars out of four.
