= Primetime Emmy Award for Outstanding Casting for a Limited or Anthology Series or Movie =

Primetime Emmy Award for Casting for a Limited or Anthology Series or Movie
- Awarded for: Outstanding Casting for a Limited or Anthology Series or Movie
- Country: United States
- Presented by: Academy of Television Arts & Sciences
- Currently held by: Love Story: John F. Kennedy Jr. & Carolyn Bessette (2026)
- Website: emmys.com

This is a list of the winners and nominations of the Primetime Emmy Award for Outstanding Casting for a Limited or Anthology Series or Movie.

== Chronology of category names ==
Year	Category title
1989–1991 (41st–43rd)
1989–1991 (41st–43rd)	Outstanding Casting for a Miniseries or a Special
1993 (41st–45th)
1993 (41st–45th)	Outstanding Individual Achievement in Casting for a Miniseries or Special
1996–1997 (48th–49th)
1996–1997 (48th–49th)	Outstanding Casting for a Miniseries or Special
1998 (50th)
1998 (50th)	Outstanding Casting for a Miniseries or Movie
1999 (51st)
1999 (51st)	Outstanding Casting for a Miniseries or Made for Television Movie
2000–2014 (52nd–66th)
2000–2014 (52nd–66th)	Outstanding Casting for a Miniseries, Movie, or Special
2015–2020 (67th–73rd)
2015–2020 (67th–73rd)	Outstanding Casting for a Limited Series, Movie, or Special

== Winners and nominations ==
=== 1980s ===
Year	Program	Casting	Network
1989 (41st)
1989 (41st)	Lonesome Dove	Lynn Kressel	CBS

=== 1990s ===
Year	Program	Casting	Network
1990 (42nd)
1990 (42nd)	The Incident	Randy Stone and Holly Powell	CBS
1991 (43rd)
1991 (43rd)	Separate but Equal	Alixe Gordin	ABC
1992 (44th)
1992 (44th)	One Against the Wind	Joyce Gallie – casting executive	CBS
1993 (45th)
1993 (45th)	Citizen Cohn	Donna Belajac – location casting; Mary Colquhoun – casting executive	HBO
1994 (46th)
1994 (46th)	And the Band Played On	Judith Holstra and Nikki Valko – casting executive	HBO
1995 (47th)
1995 (47th)	Award given as "Outstanding Individual Achievement in Casting"		
1996 (48th)
1996 (48th)	Truman	Mary Colquhoun – casting	HBO
1996 (48th)	The Tuskegee Airmen	Robi Reed-Humes – casting director	HBO
1996 (48th)	The Boys Next Door	Olivia Harris and Phyllis Huffman – casting	CBS
1996 (48th)	The Late Shift	Nancy Foy – casting director; Phyllis Huffman – New York casting	HBO
1996 (48th)	Streets of Laredo	Lynn Kressel – casting director	CBS
1997 (49th)
1997 (49th)	Bastard Out of Carolina	Linda Lowy – casting executive	Showtime
1997 (49th)	Crime of the Century	Lynn Stalmaster – casting executive	HBO
1997 (49th)	Grand Avenue	April Webster – casting executive	HBO
1997 (49th)	Miss Evers' Boys	Shay Bentley-Griffin, Jaki Brown-Kaman, and Robyn M. Mitchell – casting executives	HBO
1997 (49th)	Weapons of Mass Distraction	Gary M. Zuckerbrod – casting executive	HBO
1998 (50th)
1998 (50th)	From the Earth to the Moon	Meg Liberman, Marc Hirschfeld, Sharon Klein, Mark Fincannon, Lisa Mae Wells Fincannon, Craig Fincannon, casting executives; Deborah Brown – New York casting executive	HBO
1998 (50th)	Don King: Only in America	Robi Reed-Humes – casting executive	HBO
1998 (50th)	George Wallace	Iris Grossman – casting executive	TNT
1998 (50th)	Gia	Libby Goldstein and Junie Lowry Johnson – casting executives	HBO
1998 (50th)	Merlin	Noel Davis – U.K. casting executive; Lynn Kressel – U.S. casting executive	NBC
1999 (51st)
1999 (51st)	Winchell	Juel Bestrop – casting executive	HBO
1999 (51st)	Joan of Arc	Deirdre Bowen, Susan Glicksman, and Fern Orenstein – casting executives	CBS
1999 (51st)	A Lesson Before Dying	Shay Bentley-Griffin – location casting executive; Robi Reed-Humes – casting executive	HBO
1999 (51st)	Pirates of Silicon Valley	Lisa Freiberger – casting executive	TNT
1999 (51st)	The Rat Pack	Nancy Foy – casting executive	HBO
1999 (51st)	The Temptations	Jaki Brown-Karman, Canice Kennedy, and Robyn M. Mitchell – casting executive	NBC

=== 2000s ===
Year	Program	Casting	Network
2000 (52nd)
2000 (52nd)	RKO 281	Lora Kennedy – casting executive; Joyce Nettles – casting executive (location)	HBO
2000 (52nd)	Annie	Rosalie Joseph, Valorie Massalas, and Marcia Turner – casting executives	ABC
2000 (52nd)	The Corner	Jaki Brown-Karman – casting executive; Pat Moran – casting executive (location)	HBO
2000 (52nd)	Fail Safe	Barbara Miller and Anthony Sepulveda – casting executives	CBS
2000 (52nd)	If These Walls Could Talk 2	John Papsidera – casting executive	HBO
2001 (53rd)
2001 (53rd)	61*	Mali Finn – casting executive	HBO
2001 (53rd)	Anne Frank: The Whole Story	Nancy Bishop, Czech casting executive; Job Gosschalk, Dutch casting executive; Risa Kes – German casting executive; Meg Liberman, Camille Patton, and Angela Terry – casting executives; Suzanne Smith – U.K. casting executive	ABC
2001 (53rd)	The Last of the Blonde Bombshells	Di Carling – casting executive	HBO
2001 (53rd)	Life with Judy Garland: Me and My Shadows	Deirdre Bowen, Mary Buck, and Susan Edelman – casting executives; Tina Gerussi – Toronto casting executive	ABC
2001 (53rd)	When Billie Beat Bobby	Molly Lopata – casting executive	ABC
2001 (53rd)	Wit	Leo Davis – U.K. casting executive; Ellen Lewis and Juliet Taylor – casting executives	HBO
2002 (54th)
2002 (54th)	Band of Brothers	Gary Davy and Suzanne Smith – U.K. casting by; Meg Liberman, Cami Patton, and Angela Terry – casting by	HBO
2002 (54th)	The Gathering Storm	Irene Lamb – casting by	HBO
2002 (54th)	James Dean	Nancy Foy – casting by	TNT
2002 (54th)	The Laramie Project	Ann Goulder – casting by	HBO
2002 (54th)	Path to War	Mindy Marin – casting by	HBO
2003 (55th)
2003 (55th)	Live from Baghdad	John Papsidera – casting by	HBO
2003 (55th)	Door to Door	Juel Bestrop, Bette Chadwick, Candice Elzinga, and Jeanne McCarthy – casting by	TNT
2003 (55th)	Hysterical Blindness	Sheila Jaffe and Georgianne Walken – casting by	HBO
2003 (55th)	Kingpin	Cara Coslow, Molly Lopata, and Bob Morones – casting by	NBC
2003 (55th)	My House in Umbria	Irene Lamb – casting by	HBO
2004 (56th)
2004 (56th)	Angels in America	Ellen Lewis and Juliet Taylor – casting by	HBO
2004 (56th)	Iron Jawed Angels	Kathleen Chopin, Janet Hirshenson, Jane Jenkins, and Liz Marks – casting by	HBO
2004 (56th)	The Reagans	Susan Edelman, Tina Gerussi, and Andrea Kenyon – casting by	Showtime
2004 (56th)	Something the Lord Made	Lynn Kressel and Pat Moran – casting by	HBO
2004 (56th)	Traffic: The Miniseries	Stuart Aikins, Steve Brooksbank, and Mary Jo Slater – casting by	USA
2005 (57th)
2005 (57th)	Lackawanna Blues	John Papsidera – casting by	HBO
2005 (57th)	Elvis	Beth Blanks, Steve Brooksbank, and Mary Jo Slater – casting by	CBS
2005 (57th)	Empire Falls	Avy Kaufman – casting by	HBO
2005 (57th)	The Life and Death of Peter Sellers	Nina Gold – casting by	HBO
2005 (57th)	Warm Springs	Shay Bentley-Griffin and Lynn Kressel – casting by	HBO
2006 (58th)
2006 (58th)	Elizabeth I	Doreen Jones – casting director	HBO
2006 (58th)	The Girl in the Café	Fiona Weir – casting director	HBO
2006 (58th)	High School Musical	Natalie Hart and Jason La Padura – casting by	Disney
2006 (58th)	Into the West	Jo Edna Boldin – New Mexico casting; Candice Elzinga and Rhonda Fisekci – Canadian casting; Rene Haynes, Meg Liberman, and Cami Patton – casting by	TNT
2006 (58th)	Mrs. Harris	Libby Goldstein and Junie Lowry-Johnson – casting directors	HBO
2007 (59th)
2007 (59th)	Broken Trail	Wendy Weidman, Barbara Fiorentino, and Rebecca Mangieri – casting by; Coreen Mayrs and Heike Brandstatter – Canadian casting by; Jackie Lind – Calgary casting by	AMC
2007 (59th)	Bury My Heart at Wounded Knee	Rene Haynes – casting director; Rhonda Fisekci and Candice Elizinga – Canadian casting directors	HBO
2007 (59th)	Jane Eyre	Di Carling – casting director	PBS
2007 (59th)	The Path to 9/11	Meg Liberman, Cami Patton – casting by; Robin D. Cook and Nicole Hilliard-Forde – Canadian casting by; Suzanne M. Smith – U.K. casting by	ABC
2007 (59th)	The Ron Clark Story	Gary M. Zuckerbrod and Lonnie Hamerman – casting by; Bonnie Finnegan – New York casting by; Rhonda Fisekci and Candice Elzinga – Canadian casting by	TNT
2007 (59th)	The Starter Wife	Mary Jo Slater and Steven Brooksbank – casting directors; Tom McSweeney – Australian casting director	USA
2008 (60th)
2008 (60th)	John Adams	Kathleen Chopin, Nina Gold, and Tracy Kilpatrick – casting directors	HBO
2008 (60th)	The Bronx Is Burning	Billy Hopkins and Paul Schnee – casting by	ESPN
2008 (60th)	The Company	Denise Chamian and Scout Masterson – casting by; Diane Kerbel – Canadian casting by; Priscilla John – U.K. casting by; Zsolt Csutak – Hungary casting by	TNT
2008 (60th)	Cranford	Maggie Lunn – casting director	PBS
2008 (60th)	Recount	David Rubin and Richard Hicks – casting directors; Lori S. Wyman – Florida casting director; Kathleen Chopin – New York casting director	HBO
2009 (61st)
2009 (61st)	Little Dorrit	Rachel Freck – casting director	PBS
2009 (61st)	Generation Kill	Alexa L. Fogel – casting director; Christa Schamberger – S.A. casting director; Suzanne Crowley and Gilly Poole – U.K. casting directors	HBO
2009 (61st)	Grey Gardens	Ellen Parks – casting director; Robin Cook – location casting director	HBO
2009 (61st)	House of Saddam	Elaine Grainger – casting director	HBO
2009 (61st)	Into the Storm	Kate Rhodes James – casting director	HBO

=== 2010s ===
Year	Program	Casting	Network
2010 (62nd)
2010 (62nd)	The Pacific	Meg Liberman and Cami Patton – casting directors; Christine King, Australian – casting director; Jennifer Euston – New York casting director; Suzanne Smith – U.K. casting director	HBO
2010 (62nd)	Emma	Gemma Hancock and Sam Stevenson – casting directors	PBS
2010 (62nd)	Georgia O'Keeffe	David Rubin and Richard Hicks – casting by; Angelique Midthunder – location casting by	Lifetime
2010 (62nd)	Temple Grandin	David Rubin and Richard Hicks – casting directors; Beth Sepko – location casting director	HBO
2010 (62nd)	You Don't Know Jack	Ellen Chenoweth – casting director	HBO
2011 (63rd)
2011 (63rd)	Mildred Pierce	Laura Rosenthal – casting director	HBO
2011 (63rd)	Cinema Verite	Randi Hiller – casting director	HBO
2011 (63rd)	Downton Abbey (Season 1)	Jill Trevellick – casting director	PBS
2011 (63rd)	Too Big to Fail	Alexa L. Fogel and Christine Kromer – casting directors	HBO
2011 (63rd)	Upstairs Downstairs (Season 1)	Andy Pryor – casting director	PBS
2012 (64th)
2012 (64th)	Game Change	David Rubin, Richard Hicks, Pat Moran, and Kathleen Chopin – casting by	HBO
2012 (64th)	American Horror Story	Robert J. Ulrich and Eric Dawson – casting by	FX
2012 (64th)	Five	Randi Hiller and Tamara-Lee Notcutt – casting by	Lifetime
2012 (64th)	Hatfields & McCoys	Fern Champion and Amy Hubbard – casting by	History
2012 (64th)	Sherlock: A Scandal in Belgravia	Kate Rhodes James – casting by	PBS
2013 (65th)
2013 (65th)	Behind the Candelabra	Carmen Cuba – casting by	HBO
2013 (65th)	American Horror Story: Asylum	Robert J. Ulrich and Eric Dawson – casting by	FX
2013 (65th)	The Hour (Season 2)	Jill Trevellick – casting by	BBC America
2013 (65th)	Political Animals	David Rubin and Diane Heery – casting by	USA
2013 (65th)	Top of the Lake	Kirsty McGregor and Tina Cleary – casting by	Sundance
2014 (66th)
2014 (66th)	Fargo (Season 1)	Rachel Tenner, Jackie Lind, and Stephanie Gorin – casting directors	FX
2014 (66th)	American Horror Story: Coven	Robert J. Ulrich, Eric Dawson, and Meagan Lewis – casting directors	FX
2014 (66th)	The Normal Heart	Amanda Mackey and Cathy Sandrich Gelfond – casting directors	HBO
2014 (66th)	Sherlock: His Last Vow	Julia Duff and Kate Rhodes James – casting directors	PBS
2014 (66th)	Treme (Season 4)	Alexa L. Fogel and Meagan Lewis – casting directors	HBO
2015 (67th)
2015 (67th)	Olive Kitteridge	Laura Rosenthal and Carolyn Pickman – casting directors	HBO
2015 (67th)	American Crime (Season 1)	Kim Coleman and Beth Sepko Lindsey – casting directors	ABC
2015 (67th)	American Horror Story: Freak Show	Robert J. Ulrich, Eric Dawson, and Meagan Lewis – casting directors	FX
2015 (67th)	Bessie	Billy Hopkins and Jackie Burch – casting directors	HBO
2015 (67th)	Wolf Hall	Nina Gold and Robert Sterne – casting directors	PBS
2016 (68th)
2016 (68th)	The People v. O. J. Simpson: American Crime Story	Jeanne McCarthy, Nicole Abellera Hallman, Courtney Bright, and Nicole Daniels – casting directors	FX
2016 (68th)	Fargo (Season 2)	Rachel Tenner, Jackie Lind, and Stephanie Gorin – casting directors	FX
2016 (68th)	Grease: Live	Bernard Telsey, Tiffany Little Canfield, and Justin Huff – casting directors	Fox
2016 (68th)	The Night Manager	Jina Jay – casting director	AMC
2016 (68th)	Roots	Victoria Thomas, Moonyeenn Lee, Leo Davids, Lissy Holm, and Meagan Lewis – casting directors	History
2017 (69th)
2017 (69th)	Big Little Lies (Season 1)	David Rubin – casting director	HBO
2017 (69th)	Fargo (Season 3)	Rachel Tenner, Jackie Lind, and Stephanie Gorin – casting directors	FX
2017 (69th)	Feud: Bette and Joan	Robert J. Ulrich and Eric Dawson – casting directors	FX
2017 (69th)	The Night Of	Avy Kaufman and Sabrina Hyman – casting directors	HBO
2017 (69th)	The Wizard of Lies	Ellen Chenoweth – casting director	HBO
2018 (70th)
2018 (70th)	The Assassination of Gianni Versace: American Crime Story	Courtney Bright and Nicole Daniels – casting directors	FX
2018 (70th)	Godless	Ellen Lewis – casting director; Rene Haynes - Native American casting director; Jo Edna Boldin – location casting director	Netflix
2018 (70th)	Jesus Christ Superstar Live in Concert	Bernard Telsey and Patrick Goodwin – casting directors	NBC
2018 (70th)	The Looming Tower	Avy Kaufman – casting director; Leo Davis & Lissy Holm – UK casting director; Moonyeenn Lee – South Africa casting director	Hulu
2018 (70th)	Patrick Melrose	Nina Gold and Martin Ware – casting directors	Showtime
2019 (71st)
2019 (71st)	When They See Us	Aisha Coley – casting directors; Billy Hopkins and Ashley Ingram – location casting directors	Netflix
2019 (71st)	Chernobyl	Nina Gold and Robert Sterne – casting directors	HBO
2019 (71st)	Escape at Dannemora	Rachel Tenner – casting director	Showtime
2019 (71st)	Fosse/Verdon	Bernard Telsey and Tiffany Little Canfield – casting directors	FX
2019 (71st)	Sharp Objects	David Rubin– casting director	HBO

=== 2020s ===
Year	Program	Casting	Network
2020 (72nd)
2020 (72nd)	Watchmen	Victoria Thomas – casting director; Meagan Lewis – location casting director	HBO
2020 (72nd)	Mrs. America	Carmen Cuba – casting director; Robin Cook – location casting director	FX
2020 (72nd)	Normal People	Louise Kiely – casting director	Hulu
2020 (72nd)	Unbelievable	Laura Rosenthal, Jodi Angstreich, Kate Caldwell and Melissa Kostenbauder – casting directors	Netflix
2020 (72nd)	Unorthodox	Esther Kling – casting director; Vicki Thomson, Maria Rölcke and Cornelia Mareth – location casting directors	Netflix
2021 (73rd)
2021 (73rd)	The Queen's Gambit	Ellen Lewis, Kate Sprance and Olivia Scott-Webb – casting directors; Tina Gerussi, Anna-Lena Slater, Tatjana Moutchnik and Stephanie Maile – location casting directors	Netflix
2021 (73rd)	I May Destroy You	Julie Harkin – casting director	HBO
2021 (73rd)	Mare of Easttown	Avy Kaufman – casting director; Diane Heery and Jason Loftus – location casting directors	HBO
2021 (73rd)	The Underground Railroad	Francine Maisler – casting director; Meagan Lewis – location casting director	Prime Video
2021 (73rd)	WandaVision	Sarah Halley Finn and Jason B. Stamey – casting directors	Disney+
2022 (74th)
2022 (74th)	The White Lotus (Season 1)	Meredith Tucker – casting director; Katie Doyle – location casting director	HBO
2022 (74th)	Dopesick	Avy Kaufman – casting director; Erica Arvold – location casting director	Hulu
2022 (74th)	The Dropout	Jeanie Bacharach, Mark Rutman and Alison Goodman – casting directors	Hulu
2022 (74th)	Inventing Anna	Linda Lowy and Jamie Castro – original casting directors; Allison Estrin and Henry Russell Bergstein – casting directors; Juliette Ménager, Simone Bär and Alexandra Montag – location casting directors	Netflix
2022 (74th)	Pam & Tommy	Mary Vernieu and Lindsay Graham Ahanonu – casting directors	Hulu
2023 (75th)
2023 (75th)	Beef (Season 1)	Charlene Lee and Claire Koonce – casting directors	Netflix
2023 (75th)	Dahmer – Monster: The Jeffrey Dahmer Story	Robert J. Ulrich, Eric Dawson and Carol Kritzer – casting directors	Netflix
2023 (75th)	Daisy Jones & the Six	Justine Arteta and Kim Davis-Wagner – casting directors	Prime Video
2023 (75th)	Fleishman Is in Trouble	Laura Rosenthal and Jodi Angstreich – casting directors	FX
2023 (75th)	Weird: The Al Yankovic Story	Wendy O'Brien – casting director	Roku
2024 (76th)
2024 (76th)	Baby Reindeer	Nina Gold and Martin Ware – casting directors	Netflix
2024 (76th)	Fargo (Season 5)	Rachel Tenner – casting director; Jackie Lind, Stephanie Gorin and Rhonda Fisekci – location casting directors	FX
2024 (76th)	Feud: Capote vs. The Swans	Alexa L. Fogel – casting director	FX
2024 (76th)	Ripley	Avy Kaufman – casting director; Francesco Vedovati and Barbara Giordani – location casting directors	Netflix
2024 (76th)	True Detective: Night Country	Francine Maisler – casting director; Deborah Schildt and Alda B. Gudjónsdóttir – location casting directors	HBO
2025 (77th)
2025 (77th)	Adolescence	Shaheen Baig – casting director	Netflix
2025 (77th)	Black Mirror (Season 7)	Jina Jay and Jeanie Bacharach – casting directors; Corinne Clark and Jennifer Page – location casting directors	Netflix
2025 (77th)	Dying for Sex	Jeanie Bacharach – casting director; Jessica Daniels – location casting director	FX
2025 (77th)	Monsters: The Lyle and Erik Menendez Story	Tiffany Little Canfield, Josh Einsohn and Bernard Telsey – casting directors	Netflix
2025 (77th)	The Penguin	Cindy Tolan and Suzanne Ryan – casting directors	HBO
2026 (78th)
2026 (78th)	Love Story: John F. Kennedy Jr. & Carolyn Bessette	Courtney Bright and Nicole Daniels – casting directors; Jennifer Brooks – associate casting director	FX
2026 (78th)	All Her Fault	David Rubin and Matt Lander – casting directors; Djinous Rowling – associate casting director; Jane Norris – location casting director	Peacock
2026 (78th)	The Beast in Me	Julie Tucker and Kim Krakauer – casting directors	Netflix
2026 (78th)	Beef (Season 2)	Jeanie Bacharach – casting director	Netflix
2026 (78th)	DTF St. Louis	Francine Maisler and Amber Wakefield – casting directors; Molly Rose – associate casting director; Chase Paris and Tara Feldstein Bennett – location casting directors	HBO

== Programs with multiple wins ==
2 wins

- American Crime Story

== Casting directors with multiple awards ==
3 awards

- Courtney Bright
- Nicole Daniels
- Meg Liberman

2 awards

- Kathleen Chopin
- Mary Colquhoun
- Nina Gold
- Ellen Lewis
- Jackie Lind
- John Papsidera
- Cami Patton
- David Rubin
- Laura Rosenthal
- Suzanne Smith

== Programs with multiple nominations ==
4 nominations

- American Horror Story
- Fargo

2 nominations

- American Crime Story
- Beef
- Feud
- Monster
- Sherlock

== Casting directors with multiple nominations ==
8 nominations

- David Rubin

6 nominations

- Avy Kaufman
- Eric Dawson
- Meagan Lewis
- Meg Liberman
- Nina Gold
- Robert J. Ulrich

5 nominations

- Cami Patton
- Jackie Lind
- Lynn Kressel
- Cami Patton
- Rachel Tenner

4 nominations

- Kathleen Chopin
- Rhonda Fisekci
- Alexa L. Fogel
- Richard Hicks
- Ellen Lewis
- Stephanie Gorin
- Laura Rosenthal
- Suzanne Smith
- Bernard Telsey

3 nominations

- Jeanie Bacharach
- Courtney Bright
- Steve Brooksbank
- Tiffany Little Canfield
- Robin Cook
- Nicole Daniels
- Candice Elzinga
- Nancy Foy
- Tina Gerussi
- Shay Bentley-Griffin
- Rene Haynes
- Billy Hopkins
- Kate Rhodes James
- Jaki Brown-Karman
- Francine Maisler
- Pat Moran
- John Papsidera
- Robi Reed
- Mary Jo Slater

2 nominations

- Jodi Angstreich
- Juel Bestrop
- Jo Edna Boldin
- Deirdre Bowen
- Tiffany Little Canfield
- Di Carling
- Ellen Chenoweth
- Mary Colquhoun
- Carmen Cuba
- Leo Davis
- Susan Edelman
- Libby Goldstein
- Diane Heery
- Randi Hiller
- Lissy Holm
- Phyllis Huffman
- Jina Jay
- Irene Lamb
- Moonyeenn Lee
- Molly Lopata
- Junie Lowry-Johnson
- Linda Lowy
- Jeanne McCarthy
- Robyn M. Mitchell
- Beth Sepko
- Robert Sterne
- Juliet Taylor
- Angela Terry
- Victoria Thomas
- Jill Trevellick
- Martin Ware
- Gary M. Zuckerbrod

== Total awards by network ==
- HBO – 21
- Netflix – 5
- FX – 4
- CBS – 3
- ABC / AMC / PBS / Showtime – 1
