= Don King: Only in America =

1997 American television film

- Genre: Biography; Drama; Sport
- Based on: Only in America: The Life and Crimes of Don King by Jack Newfield
- Written by: Kario Salem
- Directed by: John Herzfeld
- Starring: Ving Rhames
- Theme music composer: Anthony Marinelli
- Country of origin: United States
- Original language: English

Production
- Executive producer: Thomas Carter
- Producer: David Blocker
- Production location: Los Angeles
- Cinematography: Bill Butler
- Editor: Steven Cohen
- Running time: 112 minutes
- Production company: HBO Pictures

Original release
- Network: HBO
- Release: November 15, 1997

Don King: Only in America is a 1997 American television film directed by John Herzfeld and written by Kario Salem (based on the book Only in America: The Life and Crimes of Don King by Jack Newfield). The film stars actor Ving Rhames as Don King and tells the story of King becoming a famous fight promoter and boxing manager.

== Cast ==
- Ving Rhames as Don King
- Vondie Curtis-Hall as Lloyd Price
- Jeremy Piven as Hank Schwartz
- Darius McCrary as Muhammad Ali
- Keith David as Jabir Herbert Muhammad
- Bernie Mac as Bundini Brown
- Gabriel Casseus as Jeremiah Shabazz
- Ken Lerner as Bob Arum
- Danny Johnson as Larry Holmes
- Jarrod Bunch as George Foreman
- Israel Cole as Joe Frazier
- Kevin Grevioux as Leon Spinks
- K.J. Penthouse as Chuck Wepner
- James R. Black as Earnie Shavers
- Michael Blanks as James "Buster" Douglas
- Everton Davis as Evander Holyfield
- Cliff Couser as Mike Tyson
- Loretta Devine as Constance Harper
- Ron Leibman as Harry Shondor

== Awards and nominations ==
Year	Award	Category	Nominee(s)	Result	Ref.
1997	Peabody Awards		HBO Pictures and The Thomas Carter Company	Won	
1998	American Cinema Editors Awards	Best Edited Two-Hour Movie for Non-Commercial Television	Steven Cohen	Won	
1998	Cinema Audio Society Awards	Outstanding Achievement in Sound Mixing for Television – Movie of the Week, Mini-Series or Specials	Richard Lightstone, Jeffrey Perkins, and David J. Hudson	Nominated	
1998	Critics' Choice Awards	Best Picture Made for Television		Won	
1998	Directors Guild of America Awards	Outstanding Directorial Achievement in Dramatic Specials	John Herzfeld	Won	
1998	Golden Globe Awards	Best Miniseries or Motion Picture Made for Television		Nominated	
1998	Golden Globe Awards	Best Actor in a Miniseries or Motion Picture Made for Television	Ving Rhames	Won	
1998	Golden Reel Awards	Best Sound Editing – Television Movies of the Week – Dialogue & ADR		Nominated	
1998	Golden Reel Awards	Best Sound Editing – Television Movies of the Week – Effects & Foley		Nominated	
1998	NAACP Image Awards	Outstanding Television Movie or Mini-Series		Nominated	
1998	NAACP Image Awards	Outstanding Lead Actor in a Television Movie or Mini-Series	Ving Rhames	Nominated	
1998	Online Film & Television Association Awards	Best Motion Picture Made for Television		Nominated	
1998	Online Film & Television Association Awards	Best Actor in a Motion Picture or Miniseries	Ving Rhames	Won	
1998	Online Film & Television Association Awards	Best Writing of a Motion Picture or Miniseries	Kario Salem	Nominated	
1998	Online Film & Television Association Awards	Best Makeup/Hairstyling in a Motion Picture or Miniseries		Nominated	
1998	Online Film & Television Association Awards	Best Sound in a Motion Picture or Miniseries		Nominated	
1998	Online Film & Television Association Awards	Best New Titles Sequence in a Motion Picture or Miniseries		Nominated	
1998	Primetime Emmy Awards	Outstanding Made for Television Movie	Thomas Carter and David Blocker	Won	
1998	Primetime Emmy Awards	Outstanding Lead Actor in a Miniseries or a Movie	Ving Rhames	Nominated	
1998	Primetime Emmy Awards	Outstanding Directing for a Miniseries or a Movie	John Herzfeld	Nominated	
1998	Primetime Emmy Awards	Outstanding Writing for a Miniseries or a Movie	Kario Salem	Won	
1998	Primetime Emmy Awards	Outstanding Casting for a Miniseries or a Movie	Robi Reed	Nominated	
1998	Primetime Emmy Awards	Outstanding Hairstyling for a Miniseries, Movie or a Special	Leonard Drake, Pauletta O. Lewis, and Alan Scott	Nominated	
1998	Primetime Emmy Awards	Outstanding Single-Camera Picture Editing for a Miniseries or a Movie	Steven Cohen	Nominated	
1998	Primetime Emmy Awards	Outstanding Sound Editing for a Miniseries, Movie or a Special	J. Paul Huntsman, Gloria D'Alessandro, Carin Rogers, George Nemzer, Timothy A. Cleveland, Mark L. Mangino, Paul J. Diller, Michael E. Lawshe, Karyn Foster, Terry Wilson, Dale W. Perry, and Joseph T. Sabella	Nominated	
1998	Satellite Awards	Best Miniseries or Motion Picture Made for Television		Won	
1998	Satellite Awards	Best Actor in a Miniseries or Motion Picture Made for Television	Ving Rhames	Nominated	
1998	Satellite Awards	Best Actor in a Supporting Role in a Series, Miniseries or Motion Picture Made for Television	Vondie Curtis-Hall	Won	
1998	Screen Actors Guild Awards	Outstanding Performance by a Male Actor in a Miniseries or Television Movie	Ving Rhames	Nominated	
1998	Television Critics Association Awards	Outstanding Achievement in Movies, Miniseries and Specials		Nominated	
1999	Writers Guild of America Awards	Long Form – Adapted	Kario Salem	Nominated	

At the Golden Globe Awards, Rhames won the award for Best Actor – Miniseries or Television Film for his performance. When presented with the award, he summoned Jack Lemmon on to the stage and gifted the award to him, feeling that Lemmon was more deserving of it for his role in 12 Angry Men. Rhames refused to re-accept the award when Lemmon tried to return it to him, meaning that, although Lemmon didn't officially win the Golden Globe Award, he did receive the trophy.

== See also ==
- List of boxing films
