= You're Nobody 'til Somebody Kills You =

- Film poster
- Directed by: Michael A. Pinckney
- Written by: Michael A. Pinckney
- Produced by: Spike Lee
- Starring: James McDaniel; Michael Mosley; Nashawn Kearse; Assiatou Lea; Kevin Carroll; Doug E. Fresh; Big Daddy Kane; Michael K. Williams
- Cinematography: Ricardo Sarmiento
- Edited by: Pat Carpenter; K.A. Mille
- Music by: Evan Evans
- Production companies: ClassCIII Productions; Black Noise Media; Locomotive Distribution
- Distributed by: Lionsgate Films
- Release dates: September 23, 2011 (Williamsburg); July 10, 2012 (United States)
- Country: United States
- Language: English

You're Nobody 'til Somebody Kills You is a 2011 film directed by Michael A. Pinckney. The film stars James McDaniel, Michael K. Williams, Michael Mosley and Nashawn Kearse.

The film premiered at Brooklyn's Williamsburg International Film Festival dubbed "WILLiFEST" on September 23, 2011.

== Cast ==
- James McDaniel as Detective Johnson
- Michael Mosley as Detective Francelli
- Nashawn Kearse as Manchild
- Assiatou Lea as Terrell
- Kevin Carroll as Maurice Murray
- Neko Parham as Dennis
- Jacinto Taras Riddick as Mr. Mann
- Suzette Gunn as Kiki
- Michael K. Williams as A.D.
- Jessica Blank as Felicia Roman
- Kia Goodwin as Michelle Malone
- Doug E. Fresh as Rob Ski
- Felix Solis as Detective Meil
- Chance Kelly as L.T. Harrington
- Shyheim as Wise
- Adriane Lenox as Mother Malone
- Michael DenDekker as Reporter
- Greg Nice as Nice & Smooth
- Big Daddy Kane as Himself
