= Hank Schwartz =

American businessman (1927–2020)

Profile
- Position: Video Techniques

Personal information
- Born: September 8, 1927; Brooklyn, New York
- Died: October 24, 2020 (aged 93); Valley Stream, New York

Career information
- College: Brooklyn Polytech

Henry A. (Hank) Schwartz, (September 8, 1927 – October 24, 2020), born in Brooklyn, was an expert in video communications technology and was involved in the broadcast, promotion, and distribution of notable boxing matches involving fighters like Muhammad Ali, Joe Frazier, and George Foreman during the 1970s. An authority in microwave and satellite technology, Schwartz utilized his expertise to telecast major boxing events such as “The Rumble in the Jungle” in Zaire, “The Thrilla in Manila” in the Philippines, as well as other major events in Kingston, Jamaica; Caracas, Venezuela; Kuala Lumpur, Malaysia; and Madison Square Garden in New York. Hank has developed and designed systems for E.I. Dupont, Western Electric, Bell Telephone, Westinghouse Electric, Revlon, RCA and others. He also installed and designed the first cyclotron monitoring equipment for Columbia University's School of Engineering.From 1974 to 1978 Schwartz served as Minister of Communications for the former Republic of Zaire.

== Personal and early life ==
Born in Brooklyn, NY, Schwartz secured a scholarship to attend Stuyvesant High School, which was at the time one of the few science and technical-based schools in New York City. Schwartz finished his four-year science program in three years and became acquainted with emerging radio wave electronic equipment, as well as video networking and related electrical power systems.

Upon graduating from Stuyvesant High School, Schwartz entered the United States Army as a military cadet in the Army's Specialized Training Program (ASTRP) for enlistees under seventeen years of age. While enrolled in ASTRP, Schwartz studied at Norwich University (Northfield, Vermont), a private military cadet-based university and one of the top scientific universities combining Cavalry Training and research related to newer communication networking, supporting electronic and communication networks that could be delivered to any fighting front.

Hank became a second lieutenant and was assigned to oversee the physical education and cavalry related activities of an ASTRP platoon and ASTRP student soldiers. At the end of WWII, Schwartz was honorably discharged from the US Army and gained acceptance into Brooklyn Polytech to finish his research. Schwartz earned a license from the University of the State of New York allowing him to teach radio, television and communication systems.

== Sports Broadcasting ==
Schwartz's company, Video Techniques, provided event promoters new microwave and satellite technologies that were necessary to broadcast television signals throughout the world. Video Techniques also served as the worldwide distributor of several major international sports events and provided the missing link that enabled pay-per-view cable broadcast in the U.S.

In the late 1960s Schwartz was invited by Bruce Norris, owner of the Detroit Red Wings, to improve the broadcast quality of televised games. Schwartz had previously participated in the live broadcast of several auto racing events and had developed expertise in the transmission of video communications signals to microwave towers.

Schwartz's knowledge regarding both the technical side of international networking and the communications systems needed to transmit television signals worldwide led him to become involved in the international broadcasting of boxing matches.

In 1971 Madison Square Garden hired Video Techniques to broadcast the historic fight between Joe Frazier and Muhammad Ali.

In 1972 Schwartz was invited by the Japanese television network ITV to advise the production crew and engineering staff for the global broadcast of the fight between Mac Foster and Muhammad Ali. By the time Ali fought Jerry Quarry and Oscar Bonevena, Video Techniques had hit its peak and was considered to be the leader in these new distribution technologies.

In 1973, Schwartz traveled to Jamaica to televise the fight between George Foreman and Joe Frazier, which was the first sporting event ever broadcast on HBO. In 1974 Video Techniques acted as the promoter and producer of The Rumble in the Jungle where Ali regained his title as World Heavyweight Champion; this also marked the first telecast from the former Republic of Zaire. Video Techniques also participated in the promotion and worldwide distribution of Foreman/Roman from Tokyo, Japan, Foreman-Norton in Caracas, Venezuela, Ali-Bugner in Kuala Lumpur, and Ali-Frazier in the Philippines (The Thrilla in Manilla), Ali-Wepner from Cleveland, Ohio, and Ali-Holmes from Caesar's Palace, Las Vegas.

Some notable boxing events that were produced, marketed, and funded by Hank Schwartz includes: Ali/Mac Foster in Tokyo, Ali/Bob Foster in Las Vegas, Foreman/Frazier in Kingston, Ali/Foreman in Zaire, Ali/Frazier III in the Philippines, the 1980 Kenya Golden Gloves Olympics in Kenya, and the World Television Champions II in New York City.

== Satellite Involvement ==
Hank was involved in the launching of the foreign satellite in China through a contract signed with Wu Keli, the vice president of the China Great Wall Industry Corporation (CGWIC). The “Long March-3 Rocket” was expected to launch in 1988 and would be used to put a Westar satellite in a geostationary orbit.

Schwartz developed the first TELEMISSION program for Egypt supported by both the United States Government Overseas Private Investor Company (OPIC) and the United Nations International Development Organization. He also served as Vice President of Shamark Closed Circuit TV Distribution, Director of Electronic Transmission Corporation, and Contributing Editor of Electronic Technician, the world's largest electronic services trade circulation.

Schwartz holds a number of patents and patent applications in the electronics and visual communications fields including, film juke boxes (CineBox (Italy) and the Colorsonics and VideoMate IIa color video projectors.

January 22, 1973 was when the first championship boxing event ever was marketed and produced by Henry A. Schwartz. It was produced from a foreign country for distribution by the Intelsat satellite system. The championship fight between Joe Frazier and George Foreman was sold to HBO and became the first Pay Per View program on TV cables which set the business stage for PPV events form there on to the present. It has tuned out to be millions of dollars collected through cable companies and program owners such as ESPN, FOX, HBO, etc.

== Only In America ==
Schwartz is depicted by Jeremy Piven in the 1997 film Don King: Only in America, a biopic of boxing manager and promoter Don King. The film highlights Schwartz's role in the broadcast and promotion of international boxing championships through his affiliation with King.

== Writing ==
Schwartz is the author of an upcoming memoir From the Corners of the Ring to the Corners of the Earth: The Adventure behind the Champions (CIVOM 2010) [www.cornersofthering.com]. The book tells the real-life story of his involvement with the fighters, managers, and promoters of the heyday of the heavyweight championship during the 1970s.
