= Maxine the Fluffy Corgi =

Welsh Corgi dog

Maxine the Fluffy Corgi is a Welsh Corgi owned by Bryan Reisberg with over six million followers on social media. She is famous for her posts featuring different celebrities carrying her in a backpack, including Ed Sheeran and Jared Leto. She is the subject of Maxine Gets a Job from Random House Children’s Books.

== Early life ==
Maxine is owned by Alexandra Garyn and Bryan Reisberg. The couple adopted her as a wedding gift to each other in 2015.

== Social media presence ==
Maxine gained notoriety for a video short about her love for Cheerios that was shown at Ted, as well as a video of her meeting Garyn and Reisberg's infant son for the first time.

Maxine regularly appears in content for Little Chonk, a company founded by Reisberg that manufactures backpacks for carrying dogs. She has been in a range of videos and photos featuring celebrities carrying her in a backpack, including Alex Ovechkin, Ed Sheeran, and the Costco Rotisserie Chicken Guy. She has appeared on Live with Kelly and Mark and with The Muppets.

Maxine's account has partnerships with a range of major brands, including Dell and the New York Metropolitan Transit Authority.

== Maxine Gets a Job ==
Maxine Gets a Job is a picture book that tells the story of Maxine testing a range of jobs until she finds her true calling, comedy. The book is written by Garyn and Reisberg.
