= Bryan Reisberg =

Director and filmmaker (born c. 1988)

- Born: c. 1988
- Occupations: Entrepreneur, social media influencer

Bryan Reisberg is an American entrepreneur and social media influencer. He is the owner of Maxine the Fluffy Corgi, his photos and videos of her becoming viral media. From Maxine's videos he also founded Little Chonk, a pet lifestyle and wellness company which launched with The Maxine One dog backpack, which he invented and used to carry Maxine around New York City. Since 2025, he has also posted videos of himself taking adoptable dogs on adventures around the city, many of the videos leading to the successful adoption of the featured dog.

== Early life ==
Reisberg went to high school at Walt Whitman High School in Maryland. During that time, he participated in one of the school's groups called Whitman Shorts, creating short news videos shown to the school, which got him interested in film production. He attended New York University Tisch School of the Arts in New York City, graduating early after three years in 2009.

== Career ==
After graduating, he began writing his script for Big Significant Things, which was inspired by some of his favorite films, Five Easy Pieces, Last Picture Show, The Landlord and Shampoo, and works of Billy Wilder and Alexander Payne. One of his fellow students from Tisch, Andrew Corkin, helped him to finance the film, which premiered at South by Southwest in 2014 and had a wider release in 2015. The film was poorly reviewed by critics, Reisberg highlighting Variety's review as an "84-minute shoulder shrug". This did not deter him from beginning work on a second script after Big Significant Things's release, as well as directing short commercials.

In 2016, Reisberg and his wife got a corgi, Maxine, as a wedding present to themselves. Reisberg often took Maxine in the production studio to avoid leaving the dog at home alone, using a doggy backpack on the New York City subway, which often drew passengers' attention. He also started taking pictures and videos of her partially as a distraction from work. He later opted to start an Instagram account of his pictures of Maxine as Maxine the Fluffy Corgi, adding a movie quote as a caption related to the photo or video. After the account had around 50,000 followers, Reisberg's background in directing led him to create a directed video with Maxine, getting voice over work from Jon St. John, and posted to his accounts in November 2016. The video went viral, and by 2023, Maxine's accounts had over 5 million followers. Through Reisberg, Maxine became a predominate figure in the Metropolitan Transportation Authority's campaign on proper dog handling for the subway system, and made numerous appears on various television shows.

One of the features of the Maxine videos was the dog backpack he used, which drew viewers to ask Reisberg about the backpack. He started working on improving the backpack for Maxine in 2020, and in 2021, quit his commercial production company to found Little Chonk to produce dog backpacks, which he advertised with his Maxine videos.

Around 2025, Maxine was being treated for arthritis, which made it difficult to take her around the city. One of Reisberg's friends suggested that he could continue creating social media content by partnering with a local dog shelter. Reisberg worked with the Best Friends Animal Society that runs no-kill shelters across the country, including the Animal Care Centers of NYC. By July 2025, Reisberg had selected one of the dogs, Axl, and spent the day carrying Axl around the subway and city in his Little Chonk backpack, treating the dog to toys, the chance to run in Central Park, and a "pup cup" (cup of whipped cream) from a coffee shop, filming the day while encouraging both bystanders and his viewers that Axl was available for adoption. The video was posted via the Maxine channels on July 10, 2025, and within days, had millions of views. After ten days, Reisberg announced that Axl had been adopted. The success of Axl's video, both for Axl and Reisberg, led Reisberg to continue making similar videos on a once-a-week basis, most which have ended with similar adoption successes, with 28 adopted dogs from his videos by April 2026. The Best Friends Animal Society also found an increase of dog adoptions which the group attributes to Reisberg's videos. The society helped Reisberg to find the most at-risk dogs that would be amenable for one of these outings, as well as expanding it's "Adventure Day" program to New York City, allowing potential adopters to take a dog out for the day. Reisberg's adoption videos earned him two Webby Awards in 2026 within the Cause-Driven Partnership category.
