= Burton Ritchie =

American film producer

Charles Burton Ritchie is a filmmaker and entrepreneur who was convicted of violating the Federal Analogue Act in 2017. He is currently out of prison on bond pending appeal to the Supreme Court.

== Life and career ==
Ritchie was born in Fairhope, Alabama. He became involved with politics in 1994 when he ran against sitting councilman Doug Profitt, who published an anti-gay editorial in a newspaper.

Burton started playing poker in 2001, winning his first tournament at the Tom McEvoy Poker Championship in Los Angeles. He was briefly involved with Pokerspot when he made a buyout offer, after putting together a consortium of investors, that would have paid off Pokerspot's player debt. He has cashed in the World Series of Poker 5 times.

In 2012, Burton entered into the motion picture industry becoming the CEO and co-founder of Heretic Films, a film production company based in the mountain resort town of Park City, Utah. He is an Ambassador Council Member of the Geena Davis Institute on Gender in Media which works towards the need to dramatically improve gender balance, reduce stereotyping and creating diverse female characters in film and theatre. He is also a member of the Park City Film Series Board.

Burton has produced multiple film projects including: Copenhagen (2014), starring Gethin Anthony (Game of Thrones), which premiered at the 2014 Slamdance Film Festival, winning the Audience Award for Narrative Feature; Low Down (2014), starring John Hawkes, Elle Fanning, Glenn Close, Flea (Red Hot Chili Peppers) and Peter Dinklage (Game of Thrones), which premiered at the 2014 Sundance Film Festival winning the Sundance U.S. Dramatic Cinematography Award; Big Significant Things (2014), which premiered at the 2014 SXSW (South by Southwest Festival) starring Harry Lloyd (Game of Thrones); Welcome to Me (2014) starring Kristen Wiig, also produced by Will Ferrell and Adam McKay; Eating Animals (2014) narrated by Natalie Portman; and the Kevin Pollak directorial debut, Misery Loves Comedy, which was a 2015 Sundance Special Event and acquired by Tribeca Film.

On October 6, 2015, Ritchie was arrested on federal drug charges for manufacturing and distributing "Spice." On January 23, 2017. Ritchie was found guilty of multiple Federal charges related to the distribution and sale of the drug "spice". These charges were later overturned on appeal.

On July 3, 2019, (Charles) Burton Ritchie and co-founder of Heretic Films, Benjamin Gelecki, were found guilty of 24 federal charges related to selling synthetic drugs in Nevada. The pair was held responsible for selling 4,000 pounds, which grossed $1.6 million, of Spice/K2 within a 24-day period in 2012. They were sentenced to 20 years in Federal Prison on September 9, 2020, after also taking pleas in their outstanding cases in Alabama and Virginia, ending all further legal proceedings against them.

Ritchie was released on bond pending appeal on November 17, 2023. He has returned to producing film.

The U.S. Supreme Court denied certiorari in Galecki, Benjamin, et al. v. United States (24‑126) on November 12, 2024.

== See also ==
- Heretic Films
- Geena Davis Institute on Gender in Media
