= NaShawn Kearse =

American television and film actor (born 1972)

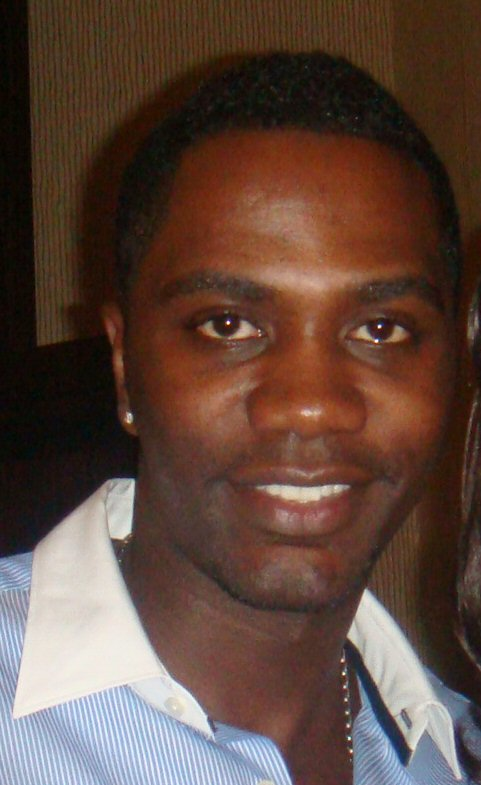
- Kearse at the Black Enterprise Pre-Oscar Party
- Born: 1972 (age 52–53); Brooklyn, New York, U.S.
- Occupation: Actor
- Years active: 1996–present
- Children: 3

NaShawn Kearse (born 1972 in Brooklyn, New York) is an American television and film actor. Kearse has made television appearances in HBO series "The Sopranos" as "Jameel" (AKA "Hormel"). Entourage, as rapper Saigon's cousin; and in The Shield.

== Career ==
Prior to Desperate Housewives, Kearse had roles in Taxi, Marci X, Cross Bronx, and as a voice of a pedestrian in the video game, Grand Theft Auto: San Andreas. Kearse co-starred in the 2007 film My Brother alongside Vanessa L. Williams. Kearse appeared as a sketch regular on Late Night with Conan O'Brien for several years in the late 1990s and early 2000s.

Kearse had a recurring part in ABC series Desperate Housewives, replacing the fired Page Kennedy in the role of Caleb Applewhite, a fugitive held captive in his mother (Alfre Woodard)'s basement.

== Filmography ==
=== Film ===
Year	Title	Role	Notes
2003	Marci X	Quantrelle	
2004	Cross Bronx	Schiek	
2004	Taxi	Cop in Harlem	
2006	My Brother	Isaiah Morton	
2011	The Briefcase	Silk	
2012	You're Nobody 'til Somebody Kills You	Manchild	
2016	Barry	Black Israelite Speaker	
2016	Supposition	Levar Jameson Sr.	
2017	Kensho at the Bedfellow	Dr. Andrews	
2022	Respect the Jux	Prince	
2023	The In-Law Gang!	John Jr.	
TBA	Steppin Into Love	Dom	

=== Television ===
Year	Title	Role	Notes
1996	New York Undercover	Patrice	Episode: "Toy Soldiers"
2001	Deadline	Dwayne Hawthorne	Episode: "The Old Ball Game"
2002	Law & Order: Criminal Intent	Eric Walters	Episode: "Best Defense"
2005–2006	Desperate Housewives	Caleb Applewhite	17 episodes
2005–2006	Entourage	Keeshawn	3 episodes
2006	The Shield	Rubin	Episode: "Tapa Boca"
2007	The Sopranos	Jameel aka "Hormel"	Episode: "Remember When"
2014, 2015	Mozart in the Jungle	Neighbor	2 episodes
2017	Sole Kings	Darren	6 episodes
2021	The Equalizer	Deshawn Sanders	Episode: "Hunting Grounds"
2021	Billions	Jerry the Guard	Episode: "Copenhagen"
2021	Better Than My Last	Tito	Television film
2022	Terror Lake Drive	Kevin McNeil	3 episodes
