= Gregory Segal =

American film producer

Gregory Segal, sometimes credited as Greg Segal, is an independent writer/director, movie producer and entertainment attorney. He most recently directed a thriller shot in the Philippines Manila Bulletin Article, from his own script, entitled "The Expat," Manila Standard Article, (originally entitled "White Knight" but changed after production ended), starring Lev Gorn (The Wire, The Americans), famed pinoy character actor Mon Confiado, Leo Martinez, and FHM Cover Model and actress/dancer Lovely Abella. He also co-wrote (with Charlotte Dianco) and directed the short film, "Chasing Lights," which stars Alexis Navarro (The Maid in London) and Matthias Rhoads (Asawa ko, karibal ko).

== Career ==
Gregory Segal is a writer, director and producer, based out of Istanbul and Bangkok, Thailand. He has worked frequently as legal counsel to production companies, writers, and directors.

Segal wrote and directed the feature, The Expat. The film was released in 2022 by Freestyle Digital Media, a subsidiary of Entertainment Studios. Film Threat reviewed it saying, "Works on almost every level…9.5/10"

Segal 's produced films include The All-Nighter, with J.K. Simmons and Emile Hirsch, Should've Been Romeo, with Ed Asner, Carol Kane, Michael Rappaport, and Costas Mandylor, Sinners & Saints, with Johnny Strong, Tom Berenger, Method Man, and Sean Patrick Flannery, and HBO American Black Film Festival Grand Jury Prize winner, Academy Award nominee Anthony Lover's My Brother with Vanessa Williams.

He served as a production executive on David Wain's The Ten, and as producer on writer-director Scott Dacko's The Insurgents, which won the Audience Award for Best Picture at the Oldenburg Film Festival ("Germany's Sundance").

He was the creator and founder of the Slamdance Film Festival Horror Screenplay Competition.

From October 2014 through September 2015, he was president of Heretic Films. Heretic was a production company on the films "Copenhagen" which won the Slamdance Audience Award, and on "Welcome to Me," starring Kristen Wiig, and produced with Adam McKay and Will Ferrell, as well as on "Eating Animals," based on the book by Jonathan Safran Foer and produced with Natalie Portman.

Segal was the head of business affairs for the international sales company, Entertainment 7 during 2009–2010.

Segal is a licensed attorney. He previously practiced tax law with Cadwalader, Wickersham and Taft. He is a practicing attorney, now focusing on entertainment law. He holds an M.B.A. in Accounting from Union University and has a C.P.A. He speaks passable Chinese and Spanish.

== PictureStart Film Festival ==
Greg is the founder and director of the PictureStart Film Festival (aka the PictureStart Awards), formed in 2002 as the NYC Home Film Festival. It is a festival for short film presented annually in New York City (formerly semi-annually). It is now under the direction of Ben Arredondo.
