= Dark City (1990 film) =

- Directed by: Chris Curling
- Written by: David Lan
- Starring: Ernest Ndhlovu; Moses Mphahlele; Pierre Knoessen; Sello Maake; Lauren Sidney; Linda Wang; Gene Mitchell
- Cinematography: Dick Pope
- Release date: 7 September 1990 (Toronto Film Festival)
- Running time: 97 minutes
- Countries: Zimbabwe; South Africa
- Language: English

Dark City is a 1990 independent film. It was shown at the 1990 Toronto Festival of Festivals, but did not achieve wide release. The plot concerns the murder of a local politician, and seven people accused of the murder.
