= David Rubin (casting director) =

American casting director (born 1956/7)

David Rubin (born 1956/1957) is an American casting director who was president of the Academy of Motion Picture Arts and Sciences from 2019 to 2022. He has worked on films such as The English Patient, Hairspray, Men In Black, The Talented Mr. Ripley, and Four Weddings and a Funeral; his television credits include Big Little Lies and Sharp Objects.

Rubin grew up in Great Neck, New York, and graduated from Amherst College in 1978. He began his career working on Saturday Night Live. In 2002, he received the Hoyt Bowers Award, a career achievement prize from the Casting Society of America. He has been nominated for nine Primetime Emmy Awards and won twice: for Outstanding Casting for a Miniseries, Movie or a Special in 2012 for Game Change, and for Outstanding Casting for a Limited Series, Movie, or Special in 2017 for the first season of Big Little Lies.

In August 2019, Rubin was elected president of the Academy of Motion Picture Arts and Sciences, becoming the organization's first openly gay president. He was re-elected in 2020 and 2021, though he was not eligible to seek a fourth consecutive term in 2022, due to term limits that included his time as a member of the board of governors.

Producer Janet Yang was elected as Rubin's successor in August 2022, becoming the first person of Asian descent to serve as president of the Academy.

Non-profit organization positions
Preceded by John Bailey	President of the Academy of Motion Picture Arts and Sciences; 2019–2022	Succeeded by Janet Yang
