= Jeremy Piven =

American actor (born 1965)

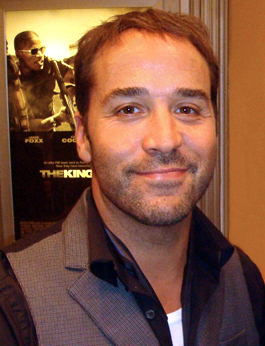
- Piven in 2009
- Born: Jeremy Samuel Piven; July 26, 1965 (age 61); New York City, U.S.
- Occupations: Actor, comedian
- Years active: 1980–present
- Parent(s): Joyce Hiller Piven (mother); Byrne Piven (father)
- Relatives: Shira Piven (sister); Adam McKay (brother-in-law)

Jeremy Samuel Piven (born July 26, 1965) is an American actor and comedian. He is best known for his role as Ari Gold in the comedy series Entourage (2004–2011) for which he won a Golden Globe Award and three consecutive Emmy Awards. He also played the title role in the British period drama Mr Selfridge (2013–2016) and portrayed Spence Kovak on Ellen DeGeneres's sitcom Ellen (1996–1998).

== Early life ==
Piven was born in Manhattan to a Reconstructionist Jewish family. His parents were Byrne Piven (1929–2002) and Joyce Hiller Piven (née Goldstein; 1930–2025), both of whom were actors and drama teachers. His elder sister is director Shira Piven, whom he has described as one of his first acting teachers.

Piven grew up in Evanston, Illinois, and graduated from Evanston Township High School. As a teenager, he attended Harand Theater Camp in Elkhart Lake, Wisconsin, where he played Bernardo in West Side Story. In Illinois, he trained at Piven Theatre Workshop, founded by his parents. He also attended Drake University in Des Moines, Iowa, which he left after his sophomore year to attend New York University's Tisch School of the Arts. He left Tisch during his senior year to pursue his acting career and is an alumnus of the Pi Kappa Alpha fraternity. He spent a semester at the National Theater Institute at the Eugene O'Neill Theater Center in Waterford, Connecticut.

He has appeared in several films with John Cusack, who is also from Evanston and is a fellow alumnus of the Piven Theatre Workshop (as are Cusack's sisters Joan and Ann). Piven and Cusack once shared an apartment and have been friends since high school.

== Career ==
One of Piven's early roles was Spike in Lucas (1986). His first important role came in 1992 when he became a regular cast member on HBO's The Larry Sanders Show, where he played head writer Jerry. He left the show in the second season after growing tired of the role, because his character was not given much of a background.

In 1993, he portrayed George Costanza on the show-within-a-show scene in the two-part Seinfeld episode "The Pilot". He was a supporting cast member on the last three seasons of the sitcom Ellen, where he played Ellen's cousin Spence. He also starred in and produced the short-lived ABC dramedy series Cupid, and voiced Elongated Man in three episodes of Justice League Unlimited.

Beginning in 2004, Piven achieved significant success as the fast-talking, acerbic Hollywood agent Ari Gold in the HBO series Entourage. He received Emmy nominations for Best Supporting Actor for four straight years, from 2005 to 2008, and won the award in 2006, 2007 and 2008. He also received Golden Globe nominations for the role from 2005 to 2010, and won in 2008.

Piven has appeared in numerous films, including Judgment Night, Grosse Pointe Blank, Singles, Very Bad Things, The Family Man, Black Hawk Down, The Kingdom, Heat, PCU, Old School, RocknRolla, Serendipity, Smokin' Aces, and Runaway Jury. He has also made cameo appearances in Rush Hour 2 and the U.S. release of Cars.

In 2007, Piven appeared in the video for "Drivin' Me Wild", the third single from rapper Common's seventh album, Finding Forever. The two were co-stars in Smokin' Aces and appeared together when Piven hosted SNL in January 2007.

Piven appeared in the first Broadway revival of David Mamet's Speed-the-Plow. The production began preview performances on October 3, 2008, and opened on October 23, 2008; the play was due to run through February 22, 2009. After Piven missed several performances, on December 17, 2008, Piven's representation announced that he had been suffering from hydrargyria, and would be ending his run in the play effective immediately. Mamet joked that Piven was leaving the play "to pursue a career as a thermometer." On September 1, 2009, Piven, in a guest appearance on the Late Show with David Letterman, explained that he had given up red meat and poultry, and had been getting all of his protein from fish for the past 20 years.

On August 3, 2009, Piven guest hosted an episode of the WWE Raw wrestling program. He was accompanied by Ken Jeong. The episode included several references to The Goods: Live Hard, Sell Hard, which starred both Piven and Jeong. During the show, Piven misspoke the name of the upcoming pay-per-view SummerSlam, referring it as "the Summerfest".

In August 2011, he stated he was interested in portraying the drummer from the Who, Keith Moon. From 2013 to 2016, he played the title role in the British television drama series Mr Selfridge, the semi-fictional story based on the life of Harry Selfridge, who founded the London department store Selfridges. The show aired on ITV in the United Kingdom and on PBS in the United States.

== Personal life ==
Piven resides in Malibu, California. His brother-in-law is director Adam McKay.

Piven played drums with the Chicago-based progressive rock jam band Umphrey's McGee on December 10, 2004, alongside Keller Williams and Not Quite Nikki Sixx. Piven is a fan of the Chicago Bears.

Piven has participated in the Jewish ritual of laying tefillin with Chabad activist Yossi Farro.

=== Sexual assault allegations ===
On October 30, 2017, adult film actress and reality television personality Ariane Bellamar made accusations via Twitter that Piven had groped her. The next day, Piven responded to these allegations, writing: "I unequivocally deny the appalling allegations being peddled about me. It did not happen." Cassidy Freeman came to Bellamar's defense in an Instagram post, stating that Piven engaged in "predatory behavior" toward her when she was "far too young". On November 9, advertising executive Tiffany Bacon Scourby alleged that Piven had attacked her in 2003, stating that he had "jumped on" her, "exposed his genitals, held her hands down and began rubbing against her body until he ejaculated". Piven responded to the allegations, calling them "absolutely false and completely fabricated." A representative for Piven said the actor was "looking at legal options".

On November 13, 2017, Piven voluntarily took a polygraph test, administered by a member of the American Polygraph Association, in which he was asked a series of questions about each allegation and again denied them. He passed with "no signs of deception". On this result, The Independent emphasized that polygraph tests are "only marginally more accurate than coin flips."

Later that month, Anastasia Taneie, who worked as an extra on Entourage, alleged that Piven "confronted her in a dark hallway and groped her breast and genitals as he forcefully pushed her against a wall." On November 27, 2017, CBS decided not to order a full season of Wisdom of the Crowd following weak ratings and the allegations against Piven.

In January 2018, BuzzFeed published an article in which three more women accused Piven of sexual misconduct or inappropriate behavior. Piven denied the allegations.

== Filmography ==
=== Film ===
Key
†	Denotes works that have not yet been released

Year	Title	Role	Notes
1986	Lucas	Spike	
1986	One Crazy Summer	Ty	
1989	Say Anything...	Mark	
1990	The Grifters	Sailor / Freshman	
1990	White Palace	Kahn	
1992	The Player	Steve Reeves	
1992	Twogether	Arnie	
1992	Bob Roberts	Candle Seller	
1992	Singles	Doug Hughley	
1992	There Goes the Neighborhood	Albert Lodge	
1993	Twenty Bucks	Nervous Quick-Mart Clerk	
1993	Judgment Night	Ray Cochran	
1994	Car 54, Where Are You?	Herbert Hortz	
1994	Floundering	Guy	
1994	PCU	James 'Droz' Andrews	
1995	Miami Rhapsody	Mitchell	
1995	Dr. Jekyll and Ms. Hyde	Peter Walston	
1995	Heat	Dr. Bob	
1996	Livers Ain't Cheap	John	
1996	E=mc2	Professor Paul Higgins	
1996	Larger Than Life	Walter	
1996	Layin' Low	Jerry Muckler	
1997	Just Write	Harold McMurphy	
1997	Grosse Pointe Blank	Paul Spericki	
1997	Kiss the Girls	LAPD Detective Henry Castillo	
1998	Music from Another Room	Billy Swan	
1998	Phoenix	Detective Fred Shuster	
1998	Very Bad Things	Michael Berkow	
2000	The Crew	Detective Steve Menteer	
2000	The Family Man	Arnie	
2001	Rush Hour 2	Versace Salesman	
2001	Serendipity	Dean Kansky	
2001	Black Hawk Down	CW4 Clifton 'Elvis' Wolcott	
2002	Highway	Scawldy	
2003	Old School	Dean Gordon "Cheese" Pritchard	
2003	Runaway Jury	Lawrence Green	
2003	Scary Movie 3	Ross Giggins	
2004	Chasing Liberty	Alan Weiss	
2005	Two for the Money	Jerry	
2005	Scooby-Doo! in Where's My Mummy?	Rock Rivers	Voice; direct-to-video
2006	Cars	Harv	Voice; American version
2006	Keeping Up with the Steins	Adam Fiedler	
2006	Smokin' Aces	Robert 'Buddy Aces' Israel	
2007	The Kingdom	Damon Schmidt	
2008	RocknRolla	Roman	
2009	The Goods: Live Hard, Sell Hard	Don Ready	
2011	I Melt with You	Ron	
2011	Spy Kids: All the Time in the World	Timekeeper / Danger D'Amo	
2012	The Pirates! In an Adventure with Scientists!	Black Bellamy	Voice
2012	So Undercover	Armon	
2014	Edge of Tomorrow	Colonel Walter Marx	Uncredited
2014	Sin City: A Dame to Kill For	Detective Bob	
2014	Welcome to Me	Additional voices	Voice
2015	Entourage	Ari Gold	
2020	Close Encounters of the Fifth Kind	Narrator	Voice
2020	My Dad's Christmas Date	David	
2021	Last Call	Seamus 'Mick' McDougal	
2021	American Night	Vincent	
2021	Ghost Killers	Greg	
2022	The Walk	Johnny Bunkley	
2022	The System	Warden Lucas	
2023	Sweetwater	Joe Lapchick	
2023	Vindicta	Patrick O'Connor	
2025	Primitive War	Colonel Amadeus Jericho	
2025	Past Life	Timothy Bevan	
TBA	All-Star Weekend †	Danny	Completed

=== Television ===
Year	Title	Role	Notes
1990	Carol & Company	Various	Unknown episodes
1991–1998	Rugrats	Various characters	Voice; 4 episodes
1992–1998	The Larry Sanders Show	Jerry Capen	26 episodes
1993	Seinfeld	Michael Barth	Episode: "The Pilot"
1993	12:01	Howard Richter	Television film
1995	Chicago Hope	Godfrey Nabbott	2 episodes
1995	Pride & Joy	Nathan Green	6 episodes
1995–1998	Ellen	Spence Kovak	72 episodes
1997	The Drew Carey Show	Spence Kovak	Episode: "Drew Gets Married"
1997	Grace Under Fire	Spence Kovak	Episode: "Vegas"
1997	Coach	Spence Kovak	Episode: "Viva Las Ratings"
1997	Duckman	Victor DeMann	Voice; episode: "Ebony, Baby"
1997	Don King: Only in America	Hank Schwartz	Television film
1998	Hercules	Nemean Lion	Voice; episode: "Hercules and the Hero of Athens"
1998–1999	Cupid	Trevor Hale / Cupid	15 episodes
2000	Will & Grace	Nicholas	Episode: "Love Plus One"
2000	Buzz Lightyear of Star Command	Brain Pod #57	Voice; episode: "Star Crossed"
2002	The Twilight Zone	Tyler Ward	Episode: "The Lineman"
2003	Spider-Man: The New Animated Series	Roland Gaines	Voice; episode: "Mind Games"
2004–2005	Justice League Unlimited	Elongated Man	Voice; 3 episodes
2004–2011	Entourage	Ari Gold	96 episodes
2007	Saturday Night Live	Host	Episode: "Jeremy Piven / AFI"
2009	WWE Raw	Himself	Host; episode: "August 3, 2009"
2013–2016	Mr Selfridge	Harry Gordon Selfridge	40 episodes
2017–2018	Wisdom of the Crowd	Jeffrey Tanner	13 episodes

== Awards and nominations ==
Year	Nominated work	Association	Category	Result
2002	Serendipity	Saturn Awards	Best Supporting Actor	Nominated
2005	Entourage	Primetime Emmy Awards	Outstanding Supporting Actor in a Comedy Series	Nominated
2005	Entourage	Golden Globe Awards	Best Supporting Actor – Series, Miniseries or Television Film	Nominated
2006	Entourage	Primetime Emmy Awards	Outstanding Supporting Actor in a Comedy Series	Won
2006	Entourage	Golden Globe Awards	Best Supporting Actor – Series, Miniseries or Television Film	Nominated
2006	Entourage	Satellite Awards	Best Supporting Actor – Series, Miniseries or Television Film	Nominated
2007	Entourage	Primetime Emmy Awards	Outstanding Supporting Actor in a Comedy Series	Won
2007	Entourage	Golden Globe Awards	Best Supporting Actor – Series, Miniseries or Television Film	Nominated
2007	Entourage	Screen Actors Guild Awards	Outstanding Performance by an Ensemble in a Comedy Series	Nominated
2007	Entourage	Screen Actors Guild Awards	Outstanding Performance by a Male Actor in a Comedy Series	Nominated
2008	Entourage	Primetime Emmy Awards	Outstanding Supporting Actor in a Comedy Series	Won
2008	Entourage	Golden Globe Awards	Best Supporting Actor – Series, Miniseries or Television Film	Won
2008	Entourage	Screen Actors Guild Awards	Outstanding Performance by an Ensemble in a Comedy Series	Nominated
2008	Entourage	Screen Actors Guild Awards	Outstanding Performance by a Male Actor in a Comedy Series	Nominated
2009	Entourage	Golden Globe Awards	Best Supporting Actor – Series, Miniseries or Television Film	Nominated
2009	Entourage	Screen Actors Guild Awards	Outstanding Performance by an Ensemble in a Comedy Series	Nominated
2009	Entourage	Screen Actors Guild Awards	Outstanding Performance by a Male Actor in a Comedy Series	Nominated
2010	Entourage	Golden Globe Awards	Best Supporting Actor – Series, Miniseries or Television Film	Nominated
