= Robi Reed =

American casting director and producer

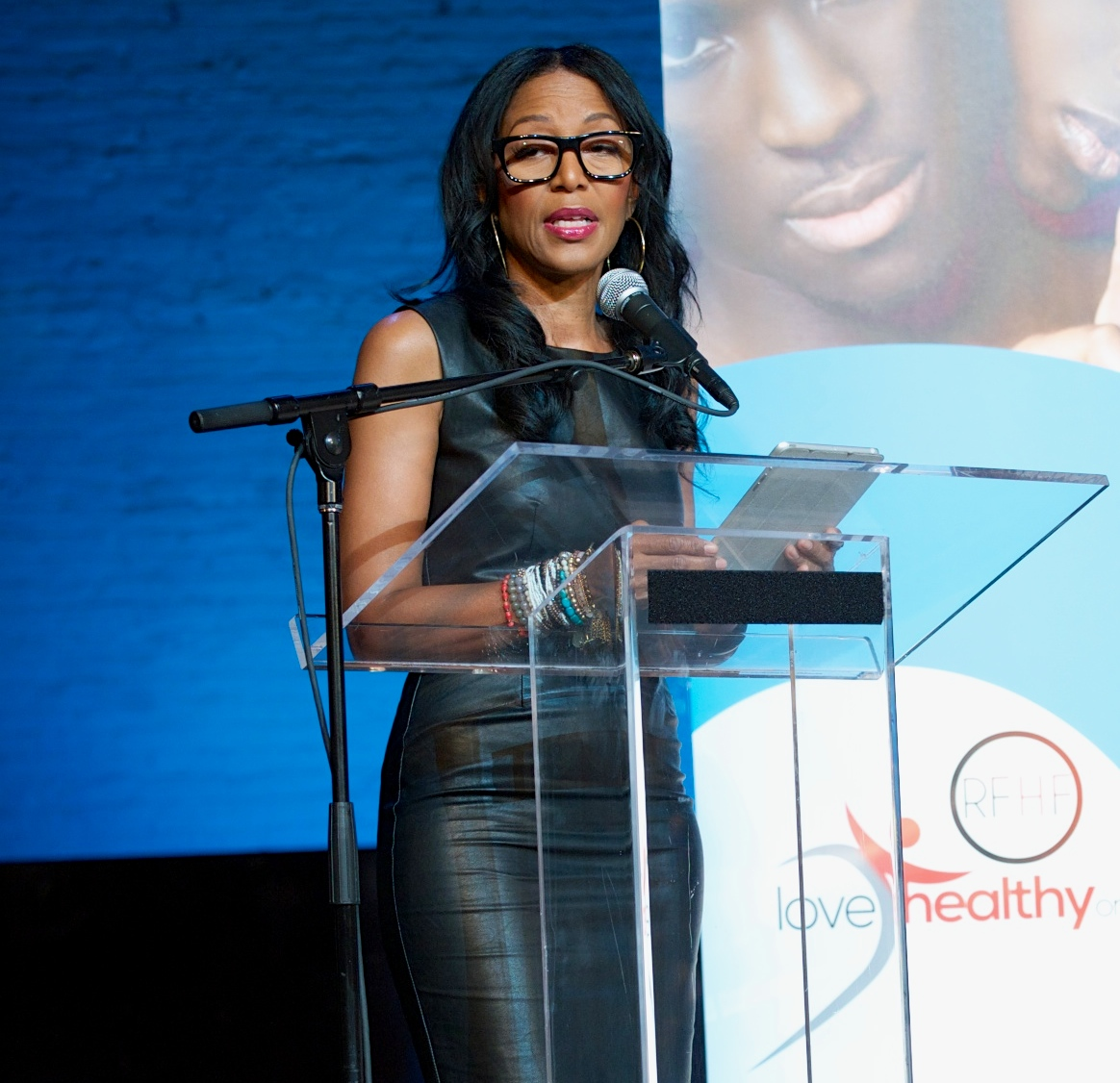
- Reed speaks at World AIDS Day event on December 1, 2013.
- Born: Mount Vernon, New York
- Education: Hampton University
- Occupation: Casting director
- Years active: 1988-present
- Children: Noah Humes; Summer Humes
- Website: reedforhope.org

Robi Reed (born Robin Lynn Reed) is an American casting director and producer. She has over 50 films and television shows to her credit, including The Best Man, Soul Food, For Colored Girls, Love Jones, Set It Off, In Living Color and Girlfriends. She began her career working with the writer-director Spike Lee. His 1988 release, School Daze, was her first film as a casting director. She went on to cast Lee's Malcolm X, Do the Right Thing, Mo' Better Blues, Crooklyn, Clockers and Jungle Fever.

Reed is currently the vice president of talent and casting for original programming at Black Entertainment Television (BET), where she oversees talent and casting for scripted and non-scripted shows.

== Career ==
Reed has played a significant role to shape the careers of many top Hollywood stars and has worked to open doors for African-American actors for over 20 years. She has cast Jamie Foxx, Denzel Washington, Jada Pinkett Smith, Queen Latifah and others in major roles.

She is credited with jumpstarting Halle Berry's film career in 1991 by offering her a role alongside Samuel L. Jackson in Lee's Jungle Fever. She also cast Derek Luke to star in his first leading role in the 2002 film Antwone Fisher.

In 1997, Reed earned an Emmy Award for Outstanding Casting in a Drama for her work on The Tuskegee Airmen (HBO). She received a second Emmy nomination in 1998 for her work in casting HBO's Don King: Only in America and a third nomination in 1999 for HBO’'s A Lesson Before Dying.

Reed is the first African-American to be nominated and win an Emmy for casting.

== Early life ==
Reed was born in Mount Vernon, New York, but grew up in Los Angeles where she was exposed to Hollywood at a young age. By the age of 15, she knew she wanted to do casting after accompanying her younger brother, a child actor, to auditions.

Reed developed an early interest in the film and television industry and became familiar with the roles of actors, producers, directors, and casting professionals by closely following film and television credits. She has stated that she studied the industry, extensively, using methods such as index cards to improve her knowledge of individuals, productions, and their professional associations.

That determination landed Reed her first job as an assistant production office coordinator on the film, The Falcon and the Snowman, starring Sean Penn and Timothy Hutton.

== Education ==
Reed earned a Bachelor of Science degree in speech communication and theatre from Hampton University. She is also a member of Delta Sigma Theta sorority.

== Personal ==
Reed is the mother of two children, a son named Noah and a daughter Summer.

In 2012, she launched the Reed for Hope Foundation, a nonprofit organization that aims to build alliances with other charities and organizations in the fight against the spread of HIV/AIDS and other life-threatening diseases.

Each year, Reed hosts her annual Sunshine Beyond Summer Celebration where she brings together close friends, associates and peers to have a good time in the spirit of serving the community. It is held every year at the private residence of a selected supporting benefactor, which has included the homes of Jamie Foxx, the former Los Angeles mayor, Antonio Villaraigosa, and Judge Greg Mathis. The event started in 2002 as an intimate gathering of friends coming together for Reed's annual end-of-summer barbecue. Today, the event has grown into a much-anticipated summer event. The Black AIDS Institute had been the charitable beneficiary of Reed's event since its inception and, now, all proceeds benefit the Reed for Hope Foundation.

== Filmography ==
=== Films ===
Year	Title	Notes	Credited
1988	School Daze		
1988	I'm Gonna Git You Sucka		
1989	Do the Right Thing		
1989	Harlem Nights		
1990	Mo' Better Blues		
1991	Jungle Fever		
1992	Malcolm X		
1993	Poetic Justice		
1994	House Party 3		as Robi Reed-Humes
1994	Crooklyn		as Robi Reed-Humes
1994	A Low Down Dirty Shame		as Robi Reed-Humes
1995	Panther		as Robi Reed-Humes
1995	Clockers		as Robi Reed-Humes
1996	Don't Be a Menace...		as Robi Reed-Humes
1996	Sunset Park		as Robi Reed-Humes
1996	Set It Off		as Robi Reed-Humes
1997	Love Jones		as Robi Reed-Humes
1997	Gridlock'd		as Robi Reed-Humes
1997	Soul Food		as Robi Reed-Humes
1997	Ill Gotten Gains		as Robi Reed-Humes
1998	Woo		as Robi Reed-Humes
1999	Trippin'		as Robi Reed-Humes
1999	The Best Man		as Robi Reed-Humes
1999	Light It Up		as Robi Reed-Humes
2000	Punks		as Robi Reed-Humes
2000	Turn It Up		as Robi Reed-Humes
2000	Brother		as Robi Reed-Humes
2001	MacArthur Park		as Robi Reed-Humes
2001	Kingdom Come		as Robi Reed-Humes
2001	Two Can Play That Game		as Robi Reed-Humes
2002	Turnaround		as Robi Reed-Humes
2002	Undercover Brother		as Robi Reed-Humes
2002	Antwone Fisher		as Robi Reed-Humes
2003	The Fighting Temptations		as Robi Reed-Humes
2004	Never Die Alone		
2005	House of Grimm		as Robi Reed-Humes
2005	The Gospel		
2006	Waist Deep		
2006	Crossover		
2007	Somebody Help Me	video	
2009	Next Day Air		
2010	For Colored Girls		as Robi Reed-Humes
2011	Mama, I Want to Sing!		as Robi Reed-Humes

=== Television series and mini-series ===
Year	Title	Notes	Credited As
1987	A Different World	1 episode	
1990-1994	In Living Color	125 episodes	as Robi Reed-Humes
1991	Roc	2 episodes	
1995	CBS Schoolbreak Special	1 episode	
1999	The PJs		as Robi Reed-Humes
2000	Girlfriends		as Robi Reed-Humes
2003-2004	The Tracy Morgan Show	18 episodes	
2010-2011	The Game		
2011	8 Days a Week	2 episodes	as Robi Reed-Humes
2010 - 2012	Let's Stay Together		
2013	Being Mary Jane		
2017	The New Edition Story	3 episodes	
2018	The Bobby Brown Story	2 episodes	

=== Television movies ===
Year	Title	Notes	Credited As
1990	Heat Wave		
1995	The Tuskegee Airmen		as Robi Reed-Humes
1996	Ruby Jean and Joe		as Robi Reed-Humes
1997	Don King: Only in America		as Robi Reed-Humes
1999	A Lesson Before Dying		as Robi Reed-Humes
2000	Freedom Song		as Robi Reed-Humes
2001	Fire & Ice		
2001	Commitments		
2001	Carmen: A Hip Hopera		as Robi Reed-Humes
2001	One Special Moment		
2005	Their Eyes Were Watching God		as Robi Reed-Humes
2005	Fighting the Odds: The Marilyn Gambrell Story		
2007	Wifey		as Robi Reed-Humes
2012	Let The Church Say, Amen		

== Awards and nominations ==
Primetime Emmy Awards
Year	Title	Category	Result
1997	The Tuskegee Airmen	Outstanding Casting for a Miniseries or Special	Won
1998	Don King: Only in America	Outstanding Casting for a Miniseries or Movie	Nominated
1999	A Lesson Before Dying	Outstanding Casting for a Miniseries or a Made for Television Movie	Nominated

Casting Society of America (CSA) - Artios Awards
Year	Title	Category	Result
1992	Roc	Best Casting for TV	Nominated
1993	Malcolm X	Best Casting for Feature Film	Won

== Additional awards ==
- Trumpet Award
  - 1993 - Won for Casting (Heat Wave)
- NAMIC Vision Awards
  - 2007 - Won Legacy Award
- Bronze Lens Award
  - 2010 - Honored as Legendary 'Behind the Scenes' Superstar
- Black Reel Awards
  - 2011 - Won for Best Ensemble (For Colored Girls)
