= Low Down =

2014 film directed by Jeff Preiss

- Theatrical release poster
- Directed by: Jeff Preiss
- Written by: Topper Lilien; Amy-Jo Albany
- Produced by: Albert Berger
- Starring: John Hawkes; Elle Fanning; Lena Headey; Flea; Caleb Landry Jones; Peter Dinklage; Glenn Close
- Cinematography: Christopher Blauvelt
- Edited by: Michael Saia
- Music by: Ohad Talmor
- Production company: Bona Fide Productions
- Distributed by: Oscilloscope Laboratories
- Release dates: January 19, 2014 (Sundance); October 24, 2014
- Running time: 120 minutes
- Country: United States
- Language: English
- Box office: $54,051

Low Down is a 2014 American biopic directed by Jeff Preiss and based on the memoirs written by Amy-Jo Albany (portrayed by Elle Fanning) about her father, famed jazz pianist Joe Albany (portrayed by John Hawkes), and his struggles with drug addiction.

The film was executive produced by Anthony Kiedis and Flea (who also co-stars in the film) of the Red Hot Chili Peppers.

The film premiered in competition at 2014 Sundance Film Festival on January 19, 2014. It won the "Cinematography Award: U.S. Dramatic" at the festival.

== Plot summary ==
Joe Albany was an accomplished jazz pianist during the 1960s through the 1980s, performing with the likes of Charlie Parker, Miles Davis, and Charles Mingus before his descent into heroin addiction. The film tells the story of Albany's life from the perspective of his daughter, Amy-Jo Albany, a frequent witness to his drug use (and related legal trouble) as well as his passion for music.

== Cast ==
- John Hawkes as Joe Albany
- Elle Fanning as Amy-Jo Albany
- Lena Headey as Sheila Albany
- Glenn Close as Gram
- Flea as Hobbs
- Caleb Landry Jones as Cole
- Taryn Manning as Colleen
- Peter Dinklage as Alain
- Billy Drago as Lew
- Burn Gorman as Parole Officer Wiggenhern
- Tim Daly as Dalton
- Linda Wang as Chinese Woman
- Rain Phoenix as Kitty
- Wiley Pickett as Gentleman Cowboy

== Production ==
Actor Mark Ruffalo was originally cast as Joe Albany in 2011 but was forced to back out due to scheduling issues and production being delayed.

== Release ==
The film made its debut at the Sundance Film Festival on January 19, 2014, winning an award for Best Cinematography. It also won Best Film at the New Hampshire Film Festival in 2014. The first official trailer was released on September 18, 2014. The film opened to a limited release on October 24, 2014 in New York City and October 31, 2014 in Los Angeles.

== Reception ==
Low Down was met with mixed reviews. Review aggregator website Rotten Tomatoes sampled 50 critics' reviews, 25 positive and 25 negative, bringing the score to 50%, averaging 5.7/10. The film's consensus reads: "Rich in mood and on-screen talent but lacking in narrative depth, Low Down tells an oft-told tale with a troubling dearth of imagination." Metacritic, another review aggregator, gives the film 58 out of 100 based on reviews from 21 critics (six of them positive, thirteen mixed, and two negative), with its general agreement being "mixed or average" reviews.

Matt Zoller Seitz, writing for RogerEbert.com, gave the film three-and-a-half stars out of four, calling it "a very good jazz movie and a very good heroin movie," while Rex Reed described Elle Fanning's performance as "heartbreaking". George Varga of the San Diego Union-Tribune deemed Low Down "a grimly gripping movie" but was less effusive than Seitz, giving it two-and-a-half stars.

David Edelstein, in Vulture, praised the performances by Hawkes, Fanning, and much of the supporting cast, but felt that the film was "not as entertaining as" the book on which it was based: "The weakness of Low Down is that it misses the wry tone and scruffy, eccentrically funny parts of [Amy-Jo] Albany’s memoir."
