= Welcome to Me =

2014 American film

- Theatrical release poster
- Directed by: Shira Piven
- Written by: Eliot Laurence
- Produced by: Jessica Elbaum; Will Ferrell; Aaron L. Gilbert; Marina Grasic; Adam McKay; Burton Ritchie; Kristen Wiig
- Starring: Kristen Wiig; Wes Bentley; Linda Cardellini; Joan Cusack; Loretta Devine; Jennifer Jason Leigh; Thomas Mann; James Marsden; Tim Robbins; Alan Tudyk
- Cinematography: Eric Alan Edwards
- Edited by: Josh Salzberg; Kevin Tent
- Music by: David Robbins
- Production companies: Bron Studios; Gary Sanchez Productions
- Distributed by: Alchemy
- Release dates: September 5, 2014 (TIFF); May 1, 2015 (United States)
- Running time: 87 minutes
- Country: United States
- Language: English
- Box office: $636,819

Welcome to Me is a 2014 American independent comedy-drama film directed by Shira Piven and written by Eliot Laurence. The film stars Kristen Wiig as Alice Klieg, a lottery winner with borderline personality disorder who uses her newfound wealth to write and star in her own syndicated talk show. The cast includes James Marsden, Linda Cardellini and Wes Bentley. The film was given a limited release on May 1, 2015, receiving generally positive reviews from critics.

== Plot ==
Alice Klieg, a mentally ill single woman living on disability benefits and a fan of Oprah Winfrey, wins the California Stack Sweepstakes lottery jackpot of $86 million. She appears on the local TV news celebrating her win but is upset when the speech she prepared is abruptly cut off after she mentions using masturbation as a sedative. She discontinues her medication against the advice of her psychiatrist, Daryl Moffat, and moves into a casino hotel with her best friend, Gina Selway.

During a vitamin supplement infomercial presented by Gabe Ruskin, Alice, sitting in the studio audience, responds to his request for a volunteer. She hijacks the broadcast and tries to recite her speech once more, but is again cut off by the director. Gabe's brother Rich, the co-owner and manager of the studio, introduces himself and arranges a meeting to discuss Alice's idea for a TV show. She writes him a check for $15 million to pay for 100 live-broadcast, two-hour episodes of a vanity show about herself titled Welcome to Me.

Gabe is skeptical of the show's aimless premise, but after Alice takes him on a date, they promptly have sex and begin a relationship. During the first episode, Alice announces she has stopped taking her medication. The broadcast includes a silent five-minute segment of her eating meatloaf cake with mashed sweet potato icing. Another segment features a live re-enactment of a scene from her past, with actors wearing name-cards playing her and a friend who betrayed her in high school.

After seeing a recording, Alice decides the show looks too inexpensive and writes another check to bring the production values more in line with The Oprah Winfrey Show. The studio set is revamped to include a rotating stage and a replica of her house.

As the show grows in popularity, her friends and family become alienated by her unflattering depictions of them in her sketches. Rainer Ybarra, a graduate student and fan of the show, interviews Alice about her rising stardom, and the two go on a date, which ends with her fellating him in her limousine. Their tryst is revealed on air, much to Gabe's fury.

While recovering from burns sustained in a cooking accident on the show, Alice decides to introduce a new segment on dog neutering, drawing on her six-year experience as a veterinary nurse. Fed up with her volatility, Gabe finally quits.

Rich continues to support Alice's decisions until he and the studio are threatened with legal action over slander and health code violations. Rich angrily interrupts the show, demanding Alice cancel the veterinary procedures. Alice abandons the broadcast 40 minutes early, cancels her show, and settles the claims, leaving her with $7 million.

Alice suffers a nervous breakdown and is seen walking naked through the main floor of the casino. She is hospitalized and resumes her medication. After being released, she apologizes to Dr. Moffat and contacts Rich to arrange a final episode of Welcome to Me. She invites her family and Gina to the broadcast—a lavish telethon aimed at finding owners for the dogs which she has neutered along with making amends to everyone she has wronged. In the show's last moments, Alice gives a heartfelt apology to Gina, praises her for her patience, and presents her with a check for the remaining $7 million.

With her life back to normal, Gabe takes Alice home and gives her a camcorder as a gift. When she goes to bed, she finally turns off the television she had left on continuously for over 11 years.

== Cast ==
- Kristen Wiig as Alice Klieg
- Wes Bentley as Gabe Ruskin
- Linda Cardellini as Gina Selway
- Joan Cusack as Dawn Hurley
- Loretta Devine as Barb Vaughn
- Jennifer Jason Leigh as Deb Moseley
- Thomas Mann as Rainer Ybarra
- James Marsden as Rich Ruskin
- Tim Robbins as Dr. Daryl Moffat
- Alan Tudyk as Ted Thurber

== Production ==
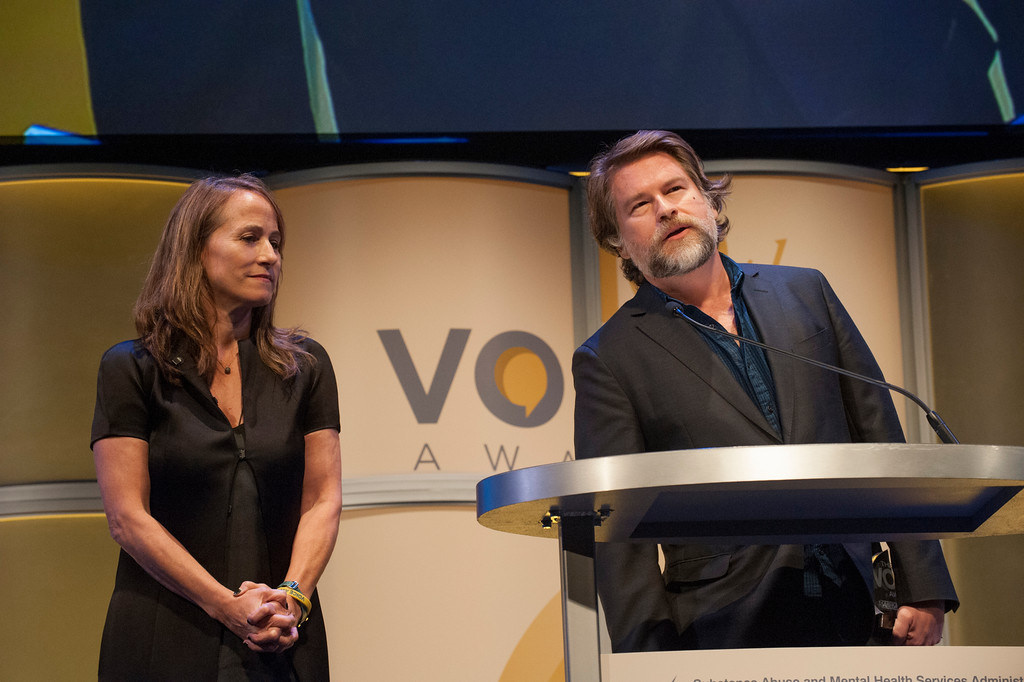
Eliot Laurence, writer of the film, is joined by the film's director, Shira Piven, on stage in 2015.

On March 20, 2013, Kristen Wiig entered talks to join the cast of Welcome to Me, re-teaming with Anchorman 2: The Legend Continues colleagues Will Ferrell and Adam McKay, who served as producers. Her casting was officially confirmed on May 21, 2013. Linda Cardellini, Tim Robbins, and Jennifer Jason Leigh joined the ensemble on July 16, 2013, followed two weeks later on July 29 by Wes Bentley, James Marsden, Joan Cusack, and Alan Tudyk. On December 3, 2014, Millennium Entertainment acquired the film's American distribution rights.

Principal photography began in July 2013 in Los Angeles and filming took place mostly in Greater Los Angeles Area. The film was shot in Indio, California, filming a scene at Fantasy Springs Resort Casino hotel. The crew also filmed scenes in Inland Empire, Banning, Beaumont and Cabazon. On August 14, filming took place in Palm Springs.

== Release ==
The film premiered at the 2014 Toronto International Film Festival on September 5, 2014.

== Box office ==
It was released in United States theaters on May 1, 2015. The film grossed $38,168 from 2 screens. The following week the film jumped from 41st place to 29th place, earning $188,067 from 133 screens. The film closed with $636,819 after spending seven weeks in the box office.

== Home media ==
The film was also released on May 8, 2015, through Hoopla, an online streaming media service used by libraries. This was the first time a first-run film was released simultaneously in theaters and on Hoopla. The film was also released on video on demand and digital stores as well beginning on May 8, 2015.

The film was released on DVD and Blu-ray on June 16, 2015, in the United States.

== Reception ==
On Rotten Tomatoes, the film received a rating of 74%, based on 109 reviews, with a rating of 6.40/10. The site's critical consensus reads, "A transfixing central performance by Kristen Wiig holds Welcome to Me together and compensates for its uneven stretches." On Metacritic, the film has a score of 69 out of 100, based on 29 critics, indicating "generally favorable reviews".

In his New York Times review, A.O. Scott wrote that "By turns touching, amusing and genuinely disturbing, [Welcome To Me] defies expectations and easy categorization, forgoing obvious laughs and cheap emotional payoffs in favor of something much odder and more interesting."
