= VERB (program) =

Physical activity program

VERB (Program)
- Formation: 2001
- Dissolved: 2006
- Purpose: Youth fitness
- Region served: United States
- Budget: $125 million (2001)
- Remarks: "It's what you do."

VERB was a physical activity program of the Centers for Disease Control and Prevention of the United States Government. It included print, online, and television national paid advertising, running them on popular children's channels and popular children's magazines.

== Campaign history ==
The campaign was created by the Centers for Disease Control and Prevention (CDC) in response to concerns about the health and fitness of the youth in the United States. The campaign aimed to combat the sedentary lifestyles of children between the ages of nine and 13. The United States Congress funded the campaign with $339 million. The campaign ran from 2002 to 2006. The tagline for the campaign was "Verb: It's what you do."

The main goal of the VERB campaign was to increase and maintain physical activity among "tweens" (children ages 9–13). The campaign used hip and culturally popular social marketing efforts to target kids, promoting exercise and being cool, fun, and exciting and encouraged kids to be more active by finding their own unique "verb." The campaign used hip and culturally relevant social marketing principle to target this age group (posters, print advertising, television, and radio spots). In 2004, an additional program called "VERB Summer Scorecard" emerged from the national VERB campaign. VERB Summer Scorecard was developed first launched by Fit Kentucky and the Lexington Fayette County Health Department (creating the Lexington Tweens Nutrition and Fitness Coalition). It has since been adapted and disseminated in 22 communities including cities in Florida, Nebraska, Iowa and Colorado. VERB Summer Scorecard promotes and incentivizes physical activity opportunities by creating a "passport" (scorecard) system for children to track their physical activity. It creates "activity-friendly communities" to facilitate exercise.

== Results of the campaign ==
An evaluation of the program in 2004 found it to have an expansive reach. Among exposed children, 96% reported understanding of at least one key campaign message. Children who reported being aware of the VERB campaign engaged in 3.9 weekly sessions of free-time activity while children with no VERB awareness reported 3 sessions of physical activity. This is a 22% difference between the VERB aware and unaware.
