= Byrne Piven =

American actor (1929–2002)

- Born: Bernard Piven; September 24, 1929; Scranton, Pennsylvania, U.S.
- Died: February 18, 2002 (aged 72); Evanston, Illinois, U.S.
- Occupations: Actor; director
- Years active: 1954–2002
- Spouse: Joyce Piven (m. 1954)
- Children: Shira Piven (daughter); Jeremy Piven (son)

Bernard Piven (September 24, 1929 – February 18, 2002) was an American actor, director and the co-founder of the Playwrights Theatre Club, a forerunner of comedy enterprise The Second City.

== Life and career ==
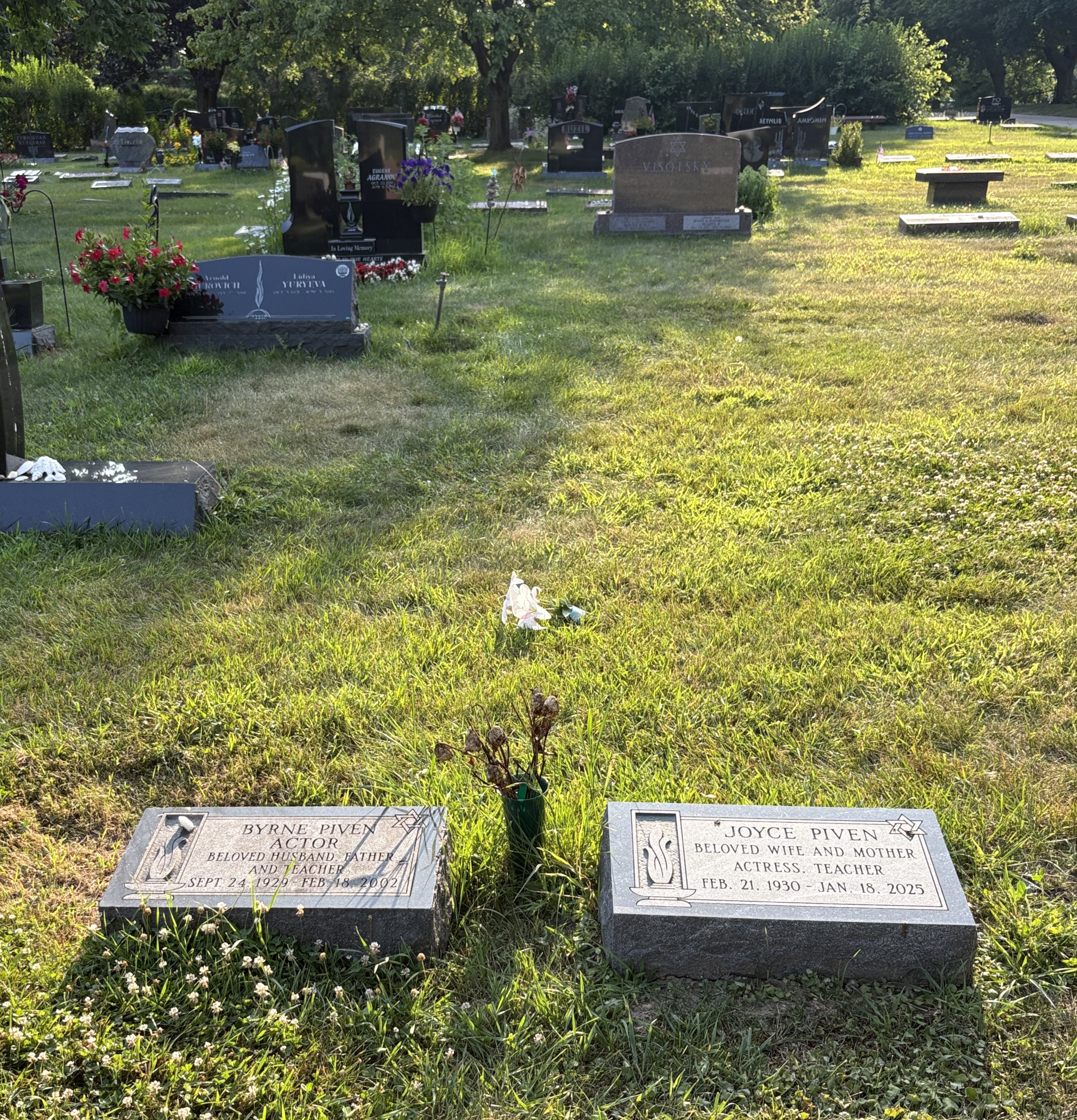
Graves of Byrne and Joyce Piven at Memorial Park Cemetery

Piven was born in Scranton, Pennsylvania the son of Katie (née Balaban) and Samuel Piven, who were Ukrainian-Jewish immigrants. He came to Chicago in 1954 and met Joyce Hiller at the University of Chicago. They were married a short time later. In the 1950s, the Pivens were two of the founding members of the Playwrights Theatre Club, along with Paul Sills and David Shepard. Playwrights featured such budding stars as Mike Nichols, Elaine May, Ed Asner and Barbara Harris.

In the mid-1950s, the Pivens moved to New York, where they studied with Uta Hagen. Piven played the leads in several New York Shakespeare Festival productions. He was also part of the Obie Award-winning cast of A House Remembered.

They returned to Chicago in 1967 to rejoin Sills, Sheldon Patinkin, Bernie Sahlins and Joyce Sloane in forming Second City Repertory and then Story Theatre. Piven spent some time as an acting teacher at Northwestern University, offering his expertise in improvisation as well as his sage view of life, combining a respect for zen and the torah. In 1972, he and his wife started the Piven Theatre Workshop, partly to supplement their incomes, and partly to have something for their children to do after school, both of whom pursued acting and directing respectively.

Piven was a standby for both Louis Hayward (King Arthur) and Christopher Carey (Mordred) in the national tour of Camelot. The production also featured Arthur Treacher (Pellinore) and Kathryn Grayson (Guenevere) prior to her replacement by Jan Moody.

Some of Piven's favorite roles and productions include: The Man in 605, for which he received the Joseph Jefferson Award for best actor, the Piven Theatre Workshop/Famous Door production of The Shoemakers, directed by Shira Piven, Victory Garden's production of The Value of Names with Shelley Berman, This Old Man Came Rolling Home The Sunshine Boys at the National Jewish Theatre, Bob Falls' Hamlet (starring Byrne's then-student Aidan Quinn), the role of King Lear in King Lear, and the role of Macbeth in the Workshop's futuristic production of Macbeth, in which he acted alongside his wife, Joyce Piven, who played Lady Macbeth.

Piven also starred as the river boat captain in the Uncle Ben's rice commercials in the 1970s, and had many television appearances, including Miami Vice, Magnum PI and Frasier.

He died of lung cancer at Saint Francis Hospital in Evanston, Illinois, and was buried at Memorial Park Cemetery in Skokie.

His son is actor Jeremy Piven. His daughter is film, television, and theatre director Shira Piven. His brother was the late criminology professor Herman Piven, who was for a time married to Frances Fox Piven.

== Filmography ==
=== Film ===
Year	Title	Role	Notes
1965	The Double-Barrelled Detective Story	Bill Stone	
1985	Creator	Krauss	
1991	Pyrates	Rabbi Lichenstein	
1994	Miracle on 34th Street	Dr. Hunter	
1995	Lover's Knot	William Shakespeare	
1996	E=mc2	The President	
1997	Trojan War	Mr. Crosby	
1998	Very Bad Things	Rabbi	
1998	Temporary Girl	Leonard Byrnestein	
1999	Being John Malkovich	Captain Mertin	
2001	Madison	George Wallin	(final film role)

=== Television ===
Year	Title	Role	Notes
1986	Miami Vice	Hector Sandoval	Episode: "Free Verse"
1987	Magnum PI	Pasqual Valez	Episode: "On the Fly"
1987	Young Harry Houdini	Rabbi Weiss	Television film
1996	Frasier	Sigmund Freud	Episode: "The Impossible Dream"
1988	Quantum Leap	Captain	Episode: "So Help Me God"
