= Joyce Piven =

American director and actress (1930–2025)

- Piven in 2011
- Born: Joyce Adrian Goldstein; February 21, 1930; Chicago, Illinois, U.S.
- Died: January 19, 2025 (aged 94); Los Angeles, California, U.S.
- Education: University of Chicago
- Occupations: Director; teacher; actress
- Years active: 1954–2025
- Spouse: Byrne Piven (m. 1954; died 2002)
- Children: Shira; Jeremy

Joyce Hiller Piven (born Joyce Adrian Goldstein; February 21, 1930 – January 19, 2025) was an American director, teacher, and actress. She worked alongside her husband, Byrne Piven, founding members and directors of theater groups. Their daughter Shira Piven and son Jeremy Piven are also actors.

== Early life, education and family ==
She was born Joyce Adrian Goldstein. She attended the University of Chicago, where she was active in campus theatre. By that time, her name was Joyce Hiller. She went on to have to marry Byrne Piven and have two children Jeremy Piven and Shira Piven.

== Career ==
The Pivens were two of the founding members of the Playwrights Theatre Club (begun in 1953) in Old Town, Chicago, along with Paul Sills and David Shepard. Playwrights featured such budding stars as Mike Nichols, Elaine May, Ed Asner, and Barbara Harris. It existed for two years, presenting 25 productions. They later formed the Compass Players, launched in 1959, which was a forerunner to The Second City.

The Pivens worked in New York City, beginning in 1955. They subsequently toured nationmally in a production of Camelot and taught acting throughout all of New York's five boroughs. They returned to Chicago in 1967 to the Chicago area, working in Hyde Park's Hyde Theater as Second City Repertory, eventually being renamed The Second City, renowned for its improvisational comedy. Joyce continued to perform on stage in Chicago.

In 1970, Joyce and Byrne Piven founded the Piven Theater Workshop. Based in the northern Chicago suburb Evanston, Illinois, the Workshop was founded with the goal of teaching acting through theater and improvisation games. The technique was relatively new at the time, with Joyce and Byrne having been mentored by theater game theorist Viola Spolin, continuing the practice in their individual work as well as through the workshop.

Joyce and Byrne became teachers to a generation of stars such as John Cusack, Joan Cusack, Ann Cusack, Aidan Quinn, Lili Taylor, Rosanna Arquette and Adam McKay (Shira Piven's husband), as well as their offspring Jeremy and Shira. Joyce and Byrne Piven were named the Chicago Tribune's Chicagoans of the Year in theater. Initially Joyce taught and directed at the Piven Workshop until 2017, then later served as its Artistic Director Emeritus. After relocating to Los Angeles, California, she taught local theater intensives and courses, and she privately coached actors. She directed Anton Chekhov's Three Sisters in 2001 and David Mamet's Speed-the-Plow in 2002.

== Personal life ==
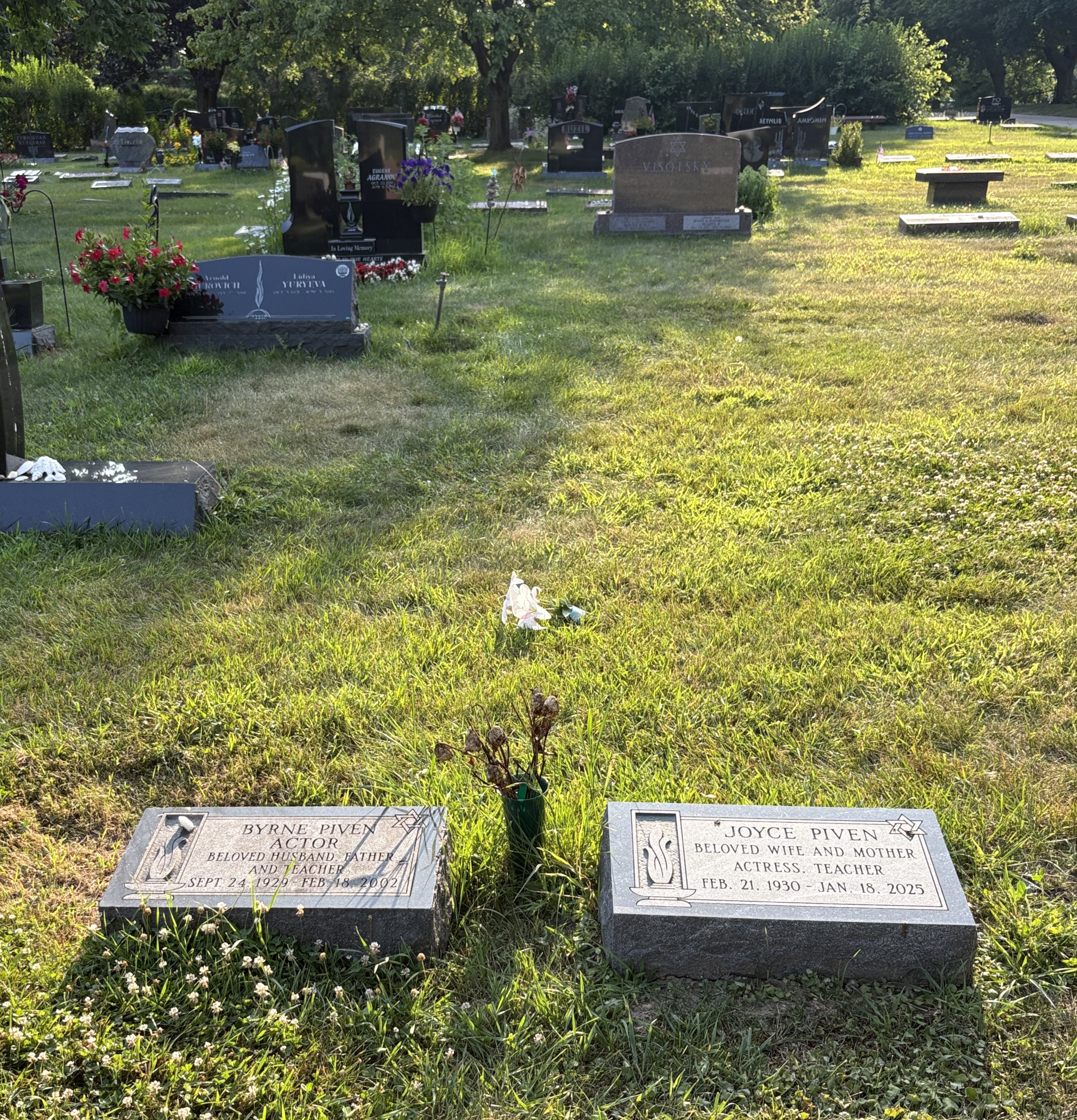
Graves of Byrne and Joyce Piven at Memorial Park Cemetery

In 1954, Joyce Hiller met Byrne Piven at the University of Chicago. They wed a short time later. From Chicago the Pivens relocated to New York where they had two children: daughter Shira Piven (born in 1961) and son Jeremy Piven (born in 1965). Both became actors; Shira is also a director for television and theater. The couple returned to Chicago, then a move to Houston, Texas for a year; and finally to Evanston, Illinois, just north of Chicago.

Byrne Piven died in 2002 at age 72. Joyce relocated to Los Angeles, California in 2017 to be with her children and grandchildren.

Joyce Piven died on January 19, 2025, at the age of 94. She was buried alongside Byrne at Memorial Park Cemetery in Skokie, Illinois.

== Published work ==
- Piven, Joyce; Applebaum, Susan (November 27, 2012). In the studio with Joyce Piven : theatre games, story theatre, and text work for actors. Methuen Drama. ISBN 9781408173879.
