= Shira Piven =

American director, actress and producer (born 1961)

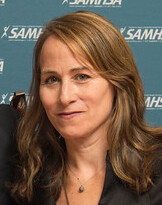
- Piven in 2015
- Born: October 8, 1961 (age 64)
- Other name: Shira McKay
- Education: Bennington College
- Occupations: Director; actress; producer
- Years active: 1992–present
- Spouse: Adam McKay (m. 1999)
- Children: 2
- Parent(s): Joyce Hiller Piven (mother); Byrne Piven (father)
- Relatives: Jeremy Piven (brother)

Shira Piven (born October 8, 1961) is an American director, actress, and producer. She directed the 2014 film Welcome to Me.

== Early life and education ==
Piven was raised in Evanston, Illinois, a city just north of Chicago on Lake Michigan. Her parents, Joyce Piven and Byrne Piven, founded the Piven Theater Workshop in Evanston. Piven performed with the theater company during her adolescence and started teaching and directing theater in her 20s. She studied drama and music at Bennington College, and graduated in 1983. Piven grew up in a Jewish family.

== Career ==
Piven has directed more than 20 plays in New York, Chicago, Los Angeles, and Washington, D.C., including Fully Loaded in 2006, actor Patrick McCartney's one person show Sinister Kid in 2013, and Victims of Duty in 2018. In 1999, she founded the Water Theater Company in New York, and led the improv theater group Burn Manhattan.

Piven directed her first feature film, Fully Loaded in 2011, an adaptation of the stage play she co-wrote and directed, about two single mothers on a night out in Los Angeles.

In 2014, her second feature, Welcome to Me, was co-produced by Will Ferrell and Adam McKay and stars Kristen Wiig as a woman with borderline personality disorder who wins the lottery and launches her own talk show.

Piven has also directed television episodes for Transparent, Claws, Divorce, Sweetbitter, and One Mississippi.

== Personal life ==
Piven married writer and director Adam McKay in 1999. She and McKay reside in Los Angeles with their daughters Lili Rose and Pearl. Her younger brother is actor Jeremy Piven.

Piven has taught theater to prison inmates and gang members. Piven and McKay both serve as board members of Jail Guitar Doors USA, a non-profit founded by Wayne Kramer that provides musical instruments to inmates.

== Filmography ==
As director

Title	Release date	Studio	Budget	Gross	Rotten Tomatoes
Welcome to Me	May 1, 2015	Bron Studios; Gary Sanchez Productions		$625,727	72%
Fully Loaded	2011	Figment Films			
Sweetbitter, season 1, episode 4 ("Simone's")	May 27, 2018	Sleeping Indian Inc. Plan B Entertainment			
The Performance	2025				
