= London Film Critics' Circle Award for Actor of the Year =

British film award

London Film Critics Circle Award for Best Actor
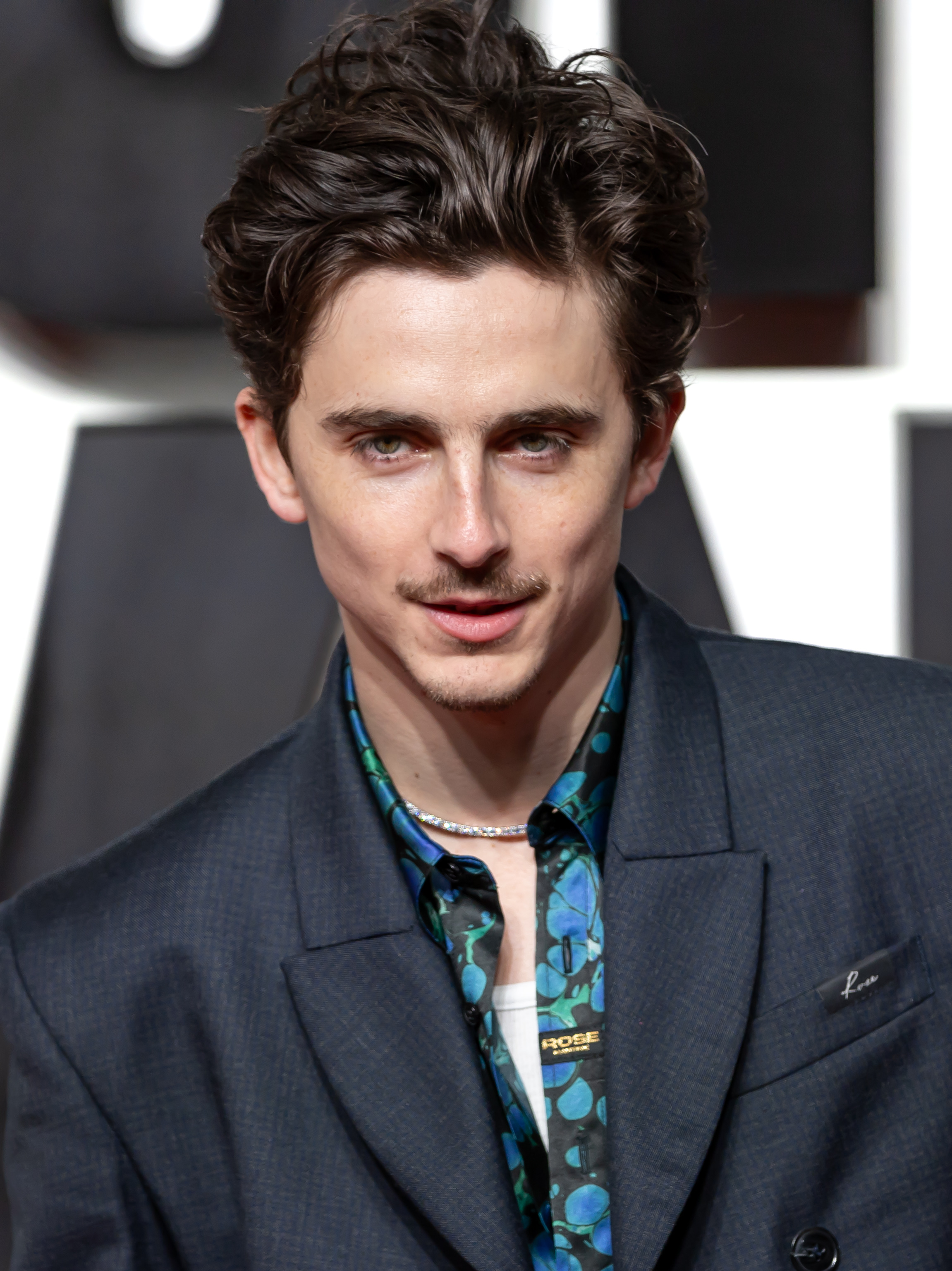
- The 2025 recipient: Timothée Chalamet
- Awarded for: Best Performance by an Actor in a Leading Role
- Country: England
- Presented by: London Film Critics Circle
- First award: Philippe Noiret; Cinema Paradiso (1990)
- Currently held by: Timothée Chalamet; Marty Supreme (2025)
- Website: criticscircle.org

The London Film Critics Circle Award for Actor of the Year is an annual award given by the London Film Critics Circle.

== Winners ==
=== 1990s ===
Year	Winner	Film	Role
1990	Philippe Noiret	Cinema Paradiso	Alfredo
1991	Gérard Depardieu	Cyrano de Bergerac	Cyrano de Bergerac
1992	Robert Downey Jr.	Chaplin	Charlie Chaplin
1993	Anthony Hopkins	The Remains of the Day	Mr. James Stevens
1994	John Travolta	Pulp Fiction	Vincent Vega
1995	Johnny Depp	Ed Wood, Don Juan DeMarco	Edward D. Wood, Jr., Don Juan/John R. DeMarco
1996	Morgan Freeman	Seven	Detective Lieutenant William Somerset
1997	Geoffrey Rush	Shine	David Helfgott
1998	Jack Nicholson	As Good as It Gets	Melvin Udall
1999	Kevin Spacey	American Beauty	Lester Burnham

=== 2000s ===
Year	Winner	Film	Role
2000	Russell Crowe	Gladiator	Maximus Decimus Meridius
2001	Billy Bob Thornton	The Man Who Wasn't There	Ed Crane
2002	Michael Caine	The Quiet American	Thomas Fowler
2003	Sean Penn	Mystic River	Jimmy Markum
2004	Jamie Foxx	Ray	Ray Charles
2005	Bruno Ganz	Downfall (Der Untergang)	Adolf Hitler
2006	Forest Whitaker	The Last King of Scotland	Idi Amin
2007	Daniel Day-Lewis	There Will Be Blood	Daniel Plainview
2008	Mickey Rourke	The Wrestler	Randy Robinson
2009	Christoph Waltz	Inglourious Basterds	Standartenführer Hans Landa

=== 2010s ===
Year	Winner	Film	Role
2010	Colin Firth	The King's Speech	King George VI
2011	Jean Dujardin	The Artist	George Valentin
2012	Joaquin Phoenix	The Master	Freddie Quell
2013	Chiwetel Ejiofor	12 Years a Slave	Solomon Northup
2014	Michael Keaton	Birdman	Riggan Thomson
2015	Tom Courtenay	45 Years	Geoff Mercer
2016	Casey Affleck	Manchester by the Sea	Lee Chandler
2017	Timothée Chalamet	Call Me by Your Name	Elio Perlman
2018	Ethan Hawke	First Reformed	Reverend Ernst Toller
2019	Joaquin Phoenix	Joker	Arthur Fleck / Joker

=== 2020s ===
Year	Winner	Film	Role
2020	Chadwick Boseman	Ma Rainey's Black Bottom	Levee Green
2021	Benedict Cumberbatch	The Power of the Dog	Phil Burbank
2022	Colin Farrell	The Banshees of Inisherin	Pádraic Súilleabháin
2023	Andrew Scott	All of Us Strangers	Adam
2024	Ralph Fiennes	Conclave	Thomas Cardinal Lawrence
2025	Timothée Chalamet	Marty Supreme	Marty Mauser

== Multiple wins ==
2 wins

- Timothée Chalamet (2017, 2025)
- Joaquin Phoenix (2012, 2019)
