= London Film Critics' Circle Award for Actress of the Year =

British film award

London Film Critics Circle Award for Best Actor
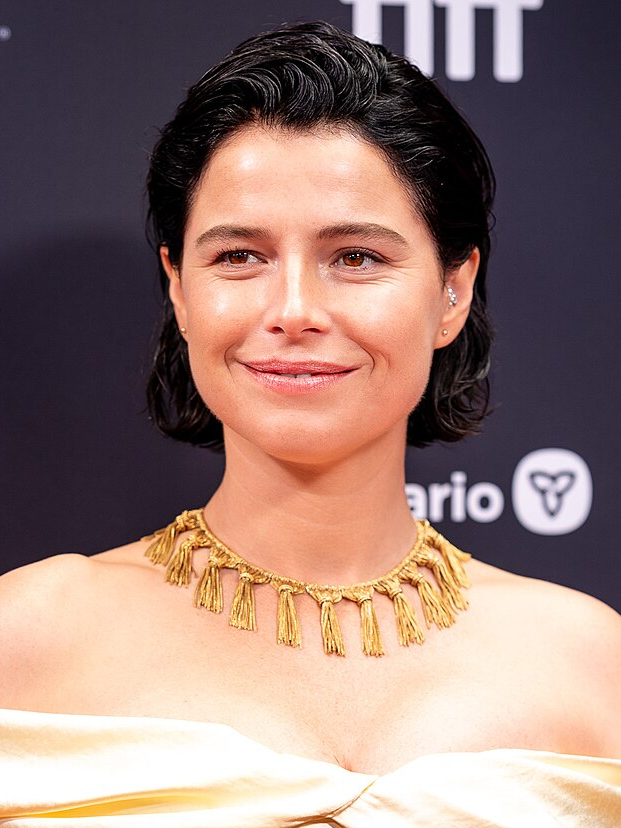
- The 2025 recipient: Jessie Buckley
- Awarded for: Best Performance by an Actress in a Leading Role
- Country: England
- Presented by: London Film Critics Circle
- First award: Susan Sarandon; Thelma & Louise and White Palace (1990)
- Currently held by: Jessie Buckley; Hamnet (2025)
- Website: criticscircle.org

The London Film Critics Circle Award for Actress of the Year is an annual award given by the London Film Critics' Circle.

== Winners ==
^{*} : Winner of the Academy Award for Best Actress
¥ : Winner of the Academy Award for Best Supporting Actress

=== 1990s ===
Year	Winner	Film	Role
1991	Susan Sarandon	Thelma & Louise	Louise Sawyer
1991	Susan Sarandon	White Palace	Nora Baker
1992	Judy Davis	Husbands and Wives	Sally
1992	Judy Davis	Barton Fink	Audrey Taylor
1992	Judy Davis	Naked Lunch	Joan Lee / Joan Frost
1993	Holly Hunter *	The Piano	Ada McGrath
1994	Linda Fiorentino	The Last Seduction	Bridget Gregory / Wendy Kroy
1995	Nicole Kidman	To Die For	Suzanne Stone-Maretto
1996	Frances McDormand *	Fargo	Marge Gunderson
1997	Claire Danes	Romeo + Juliet	Juliet Capulet
1998	Cate Blanchett	Elizabeth	Queen Elizabeth I
1999	Annette Bening	American Beauty	Carolyn Burnham

=== 2000s ===
Year	Winner	Film	Role
2000	Julia Roberts *	Erin Brockovich	Erin Brockovich
2001	Nicole Kidman	The Others	Grace Stewart
2001	Nicole Kidman	Moulin Rouge!	Satine
2002	Stockard Channing	The Business of Strangers	Julie Styron
2003	Julianne Moore	Far from Heaven	Cathy Whitaker
2004	Imelda Staunton	Vera Drake	Vera Drake
2005	Naomi Watts	King Kong	Ann Darrow
2006	Meryl Streep	The Devil Wears Prada	Miranda Priestly
2007	Marion Cotillard *	La Vie en Rose (La môme)	Édith Piaf
2008	Kate Winslet *	The Reader	Hanna Schmitz
2008	Kate Winslet *	Revolutionary Road	April Wheeler
2009	Mo'Nique ¥	Precious	Mary Lee Johnston

=== 2010s ===
Year	Winner	Film	Role
2010	Annette Bening	The Kids Are All Right	Dr. Nicole "Nic" Allgood
2011	Anna Paquin	Margaret	Lisa Cohen
2011	Meryl Streep *	The Iron Lady	Margaret Thatcher
2012	Emmanuelle Riva	Amour	Anne Laurent
2013	Cate Blanchett *	Blue Jasmine	Jeanette "Jasmine" Francis
2014	Julianne Moore *	Still Alice	Alice Daly Howland
2015	Charlotte Rampling	45 Years	Kate Mercer
2016	Isabelle Huppert	Things to Come	Nathalie Chazeaux
2017	Frances McDormand *	Three Billboards Outside Ebbing, Missouri	Mildred Hayes
2018	Olivia Colman *	The Favourite	Queen Anne
2019	Renée Zellweger *	Judy	Judy Garland

=== 2020s ===
Year	Winner	Film	Role
2020	Frances McDormand *	Nomadland	Fern
2021	Olivia Colman	The Lost Daughter	Leda Caruso
2022	Cate Blanchett	Tár	Lydia Tár
2023	Emma Stone *	Poor Things	Bella Baxter
2024	Marianne Jean-Baptiste	Hard Truths	Pansy Deacon
2025	Jessie Buckley *	Hamnet	Agnes Shakespeare

== Multiple wins ==
3 wins

- Cate Blanchett
- Frances McDormand

2 wins

- Annette Bening
- Olivia Colman
- Nicole Kidman
- Julianne Moore
- Meryl Streep
