= London Film Critics' Circle Award for Director of the Year =

British film award

London Film Critics Circle Award for Best Director
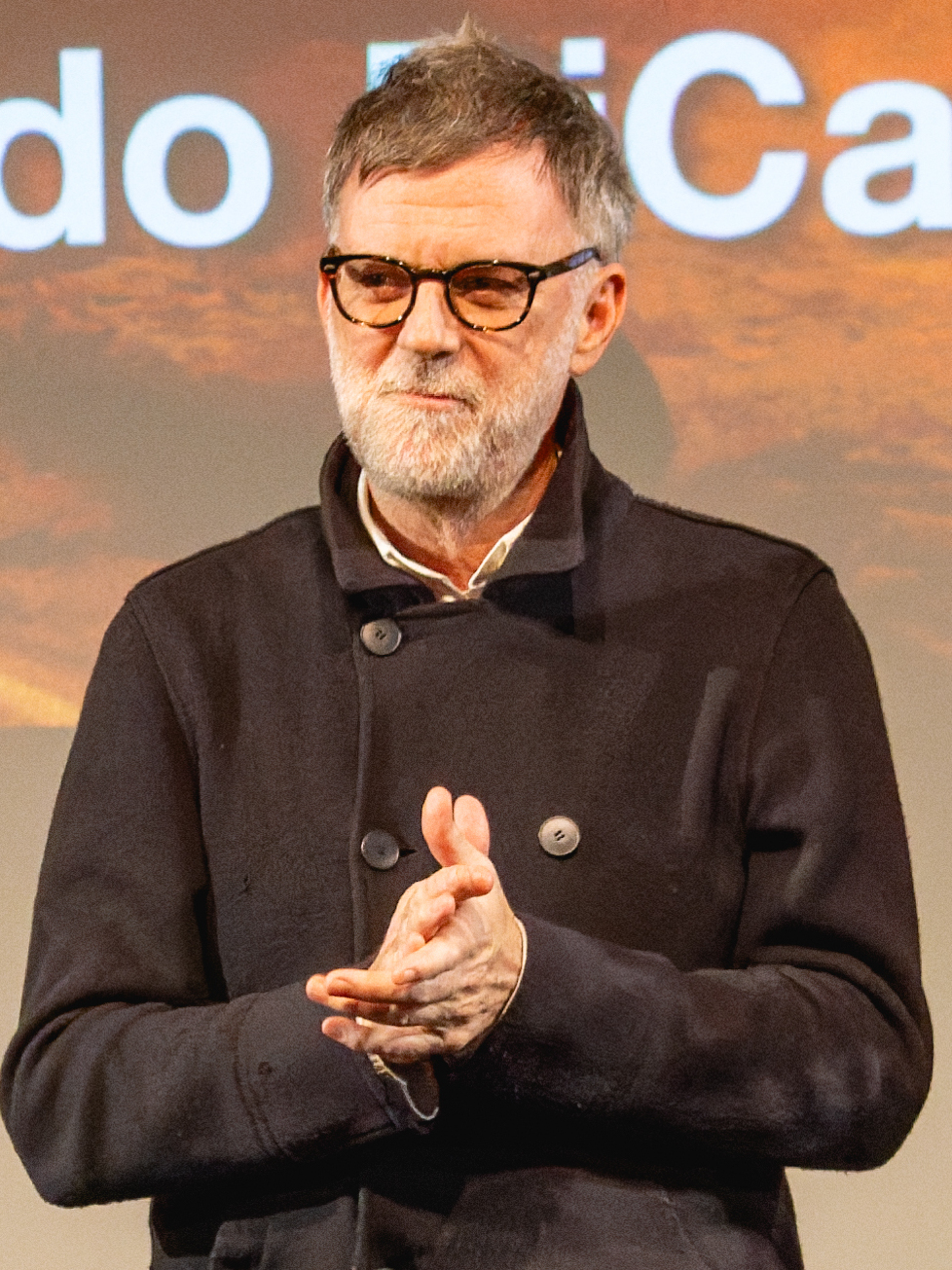
- The 2025 recipient: Paul Thomas Anderson
- Awarded for: Best Director
- Country: England
- Presented by: London Film Critics Circle
- First award: Nicolas Roeg; Bad Timing (1980)
- Currently held by: Paul Thomas Anderson; One Battle After Another (2025)
- Website: criticscircle.org

The London Film Critics' Circle Award for Director of the Year is an annual award given by the London Film Critics' Circle.

== List of winners ==
Year	Director(s)	Film(s)
1980	Nicolas Roeg	Bad Timing
1981	Andrzej Wajda	Man of Iron
1982	Costa Gavras	Missing
1983	Andrzej Wajda	Danton
1984	Neil Jordan	The Company of Wolves
1985	Roland Joffé	The Killing Fields°
1986	Akira Kurosawa	Ran°
1987	Stanley Kubrick	Full Metal Jacket
1988	John Huston	The Dead
1989	Terence Davies	Distant Voices, Still Lives
1990	Woody Allen	Crimes and Misdemeanors°
1991	Ridley Scott	Thelma & Louise°
1992	Robert Altman	The Player°
1993	James Ivory	The Remains of the Day°
1994	Steven Spielberg	Schindler's List≈
1995	Peter Jackson	Heavenly Creatures
1996	Joel Coen	Fargo°
1997	Curtis Hanson	L.A. Confidential°
1998	Peter Weir	The Truman Show°
1999	Sam Mendes	American Beauty≈
2000	Spike Jonze	Being John Malkovich°
2001	Alejandro González Iñárritu	Love's a Bitch (Amores perros)
2002	Phillip Noyce	The Quiet American and Rabbit-Proof Fence
2003	Clint Eastwood	Mystic River°
2004	Martin Scorsese	The Aviator°
2005	Ang Lee	Brokeback Mountain≈
2006	Paul Greengrass	United 93°
2007	Paul Thomas Anderson	There Will Be Blood°
2008	David Fincher	The Curious Case of Benjamin Button°
2009	Kathryn Bigelow	The Hurt Locker≈
2010	David Fincher	The Social Network°
2011	Michel Hazanavicius	The Artist≈
2012	Ang Lee	Life of Pi≈
2013	Alfonso Cuarón	Gravity≈
2014	Richard Linklater	Boyhood°
2015	George Miller	Mad Max: Fury Road°
2016	László Nemes	Son of Saul
2017	Sean Baker	The Florida Project
2018	Alfonso Cuarón	Roma≈
2019	Bong Joon-ho	Parasite≈
2020	Steve McQueen	Small Axe
2021	Jane Campion	The Power of the Dog≈
2022	Todd Field	Tár°
2023	Jonathan Glazer	The Zone of Interest°
2024	RaMell Ross	Nickel Boys

== See also ==
- BAFTA Award for Best Direction
- Critics' Choice Movie Award for Best Director

== Notes ==
- ≈ Academy Award for Best Director winner
- ° Academy Award for Best Director nominee

== Multiple winners ==
The following directors have won multiple awards:

- 2 wins – Andrzej Wajda (1981, 1983)
- 2 wins – David Fincher (2008, 2010)
- 2 wins – Ang Lee (2005, 2012)
- 2 wins – Alfonso Cuarón (2013, 2018)
