= London Film Critics' Circle Award for British or Irish Film of the Year =

British film award

The London Film Critics Circle's British Film of the Year:

== List of winners ==
Year	Film	Director(s)
1991	Life Is Sweet	Mike Leigh
1992	Howards End	James Ivory
1993	The Remains of the Day	James Ivory (2)
1994	Four Weddings and a Funeral	Mike Newell
1995	The Madness of King George	Nicholas Hytner
1996	Secrets & Lies	Mike Leigh (2)
1997	The Full Monty	Peter Cattaneo
1998	Lock, Stock and Two Smoking Barrels	Guy Ritchie
1999	East Is East	Damien O'Donnell
2000	Billy Elliot	Stephen Daldry
2001	Gosford Park	Robert Altman
2002	All or Nothing	Mike Leigh (3)
2003	The Magdalene Sisters	Peter Mullan
2004	Vera Drake	Mike Leigh (4)
2005	The Constant Gardener	Fernando Meirelles
2006	The Queen	Stephen Frears
2007	Control	Anton Corbijn
2008	Slumdog Millionaire	Danny Boyle
2009	Fish Tank	Andrea Arnold
2010	The King's Speech	Tom Hooper
2011	We Need to Talk About Kevin	Lynne Ramsay
2012	Berberian Sound Studio	Peter Strickland
2013	The Selfish Giant	Clio Barnard
2014	Under the Skin	Jonathan Glazer
2015	45 Years	Andrew Haigh
2016	I, Daniel Blake	Ken Loach
2017	Dunkirk	Christopher Nolan
2018	The Favourite	Yorgos Lanthimos
2019	The Souvenir	Joanna Hogg
2020	Saint Maud	Rose Glass
2021	The Souvenir Part II	Joanna Hogg (2)
2022	The Banshees of Inisherin	Martin McDonagh
2023	All of Us Strangers	Andrew Haigh (2)
2024	Conclave	Edward Berger
2025	Pillion	Harry Lighton

== Multiple winning directors ==
The following directors have won multiple awards:

- 4 wins – Mike Leigh (1991, 1996, 2002, 2004)
- 2 wins – James Ivory (1992, 1993)
- 2 wins – Joanna Hogg (2019, 2021)
