= London Film Critics' Circle Award for Foreign Language Film of the Year =

British film award

The London Film Critics' Circle Award for Foreign Language of the Year is an annual award given by the London Film Critics' Circle.

== List of winners and nominees ==
Year	Film	Director	Director's nationality
1980	The Marriage of Maria Braun	Rainer Werner Fassbinder	West Germany
1980	Angi Vera	Pál Gábor	Hungary
1981	Man of Iron	Andrzej Wajda	Poland
1982	Mephisto	István Szabó	Hungary
1983	Yol	Yılmaz Güney	Turkey
1984	A Sunday in the Country	Bertrand Tavernier	France
1985	Heimat: A Chronicle of Germany	Edgar Reitz	West Germany
1986	Ran	Akira Kurosawa	Japan
1987	Jean de Florette	Claude Berri	France
1988	Babette's Feast	Gabriel Axel	Denmark
1989	Au revoir les enfants	Louis Malle	France
1990	Cinema Paradiso	Giuseppe Tornatore	Italy
1991	Cyrano de Bergerac	Jean-Paul Rappeneau	France
1992	Raise the Red Lantern	Zhang Yimou	China
1993	A Heart in Winter	Claude Sautet	France
1994	Farewell My Concubine	Chen Kaige	China
1995	Il Postino: The Postman	Michael Radford	Italy
1996	Les Misérables	Claude Lelouch	France
1997	Ridicule	Patrice Leconte	France
1998	Shall We Dance?	Masayuki Suo	Japan
1999	All About My Mother	Pedro Almodóvar	Spain
2000	Crouching Tiger, Hidden Dragon	Ang Lee	China
2001	Amélie	Jean-Pierre Jeunet	France
2002	Y tu mamá también	Alfonso Cuarón	Mexico
2003	Good Bye, Lenin!	Wolfgang Becker	Germany
2004	The Motorcycle Diaries	Walter Salles	Brazil
2005	Downfall	Oliver Hirschbiegel	Germany
2006	Volver	Pedro Almodóvar (2)	Spain
2007	The Lives of Others	Florian Henckel von Donnersmarck	Germany
2008	Waltz with Bashir	Ari Folman	Israel
2009	Let the Right One In	Tomas Alfredson	Sweden
2010	Of Gods and Men	Xavier Beauvois	France
2011	A Separation	Asghar Farhadi	Iran
2012	Rust and Bone	Jacques Audiard	France
2013	Blue Is the Warmest Colour	Abdellatif Kechiche	France
2014	Leviathan	Andrey Zvyagintsev	Russia
2015	The Look of Silence	Joshua Oppenheimer	Denmark
2016	Toni Erdmann	Maren Ade	Germany
2017	Elle	Paul Verhoeven	Netherlands
2018	Cold War	Paweł Pawlikowski	Poland
2019	Portrait of a Lady on Fire	Céline Sciamma	France
2020	Another Round	Thomas Vinterberg	Denmark
2021	Drive My Car	Ryusuke Hamaguchi	Japan
2022	Decision to Leave	Park Chan-wook	South Korea
2022	The Quiet Girl	Colm Bairéad	Ireland
2023	Past Lives	Celine Song	South Korea Canada
2023	Anatomy of a Fall	Justine Triet	France
2023	The Boy and the Heron	Hayao Miyazaki	Japan
2023	Fallen Leaves	Aki Kaurismäki	Finland
2023	The Zone of Interest	Jonathan Glazer	United Kingdom
2024	All We Imagine as Light	Payal Kapadia	India
2024	La Chimera	Alice Rohrwacher	Italy
2024	Emilia Pérez	Jacques Audiard	France
2024	I’m Still Here	Walter Salles	Brazil
2024	Kneecap	Rich Peppiatt	United Kingdom Ireland
