= London Film Critics' Circle Award for Screenwriter of the Year =

British film award

The London Film Critics' Circle Award for Screenwriter of the Year is an annual award given by the London Film Critics' Circle.

== List of winners ==
Year	Screenwriter(s)	Film(s)(2)
1980	Steve Tesich	Breaking Away
1981	Colin Welland	Chariots of Fire
1982	Costa-Gavras and Donald E. Stewart	Missing
1983	Ruth Prawer Jhabvala	Heat and Dust
1984	Philip Kaufman	The Right Stuff
1985	Alan Bennett	A Private Function
1986	Woody Allen	Hannah and Her Sisters
1987	Alan Bennett (2)	Prick Up Your Ears
1988	David Mamet	House of Games
1989	Christopher Hampton	Dangerous Liaisons
1990	Woody Allen (2)	Crimes and Misdemeanors
1991	David Mamet (2)	Homicide
1992	Michael Tolkin	The Player
1993	Harold Ramis and Danny Rubin	Groundhog Day
1994	Quentin Tarantino	Pulp Fiction
1995	Paul Attanasio	Quiz Show and Disclosure
1996	Joel Coen and Ethan Coen	Fargo
1997	Curtis Hanson and Brian Helgeland	L.A. Confidential
1998	Andrew Niccol	The Truman Show and Gattaca
1999	Alan Ball	American Beauty
2000	Charlie Kaufman	Being John Malkovich
2001	Joel Coen and Ethan Coen (2)	The Man Who Wasn't There
2002	Andrew Bovell	Lantana
2003	John Collee and Peter Weir	Master and Commander: The Far Side of the World
2004	Charlie Kaufman (2)	Eternal Sunshine of the Spotless Mind
2005	Paul Haggis and Bobby Moresco	Crash
2006	Peter Morgan	The Queen
2007	Florian Henckel von Donnersmarck	The Lives of Others
2008	Simon Beaufoy	Slumdog Millionaire
2009	Jesse Armstrong, Simon Blackwell, Armando Iannucci, and Tony Roche	In the Loop
2010	Aaron Sorkin	The Social Network
2011	Asghar Farhadi	A Separation
2012	Michael Haneke	Amour
2013	Joel Coen and Ethan Coen (3)	Inside Llewyn Davis
2014	Wes Anderson	The Grand Budapest Hotel
2015	Tom McCarthy and Josh Singer	Spotlight
2016	Kenneth Lonergan	Manchester by the Sea
2017	Martin McDonagh	Three Billboards Outside Ebbing, Missouri
2018	Deborah Davis and Tony McNamara	The Favourite
2019	Noah Baumbach	Marriage Story
2020	Chloé Zhao	Nomadland
2021	Ryusuke Hamaguchi and Takamasa Oe	Drive My Car
2022	Martin McDonagh	The Banshees of Inisherin
2023	Justine Triet & Arthur Harari	Anatomy of a Fall
2024	Jesse Eisenberg	A Real Pain

== Multiple winners ==
The following screenwriters have won multiple awards:

- 3 wins – Joel Coen and Ethan Coen (1996, 2001, 2013)
- 2 wins – Alan Bennett (1985, 1987)
- 2 wins – Woody Allen (1986, 1990)
- 2 wins – David Mamet (1988, 1991)
- 2 wins – Charlie Kaufman (2000, 2004)
- 2 wins - Martin McDonagh (2017, 2022)
