= London Film Critics Circle Awards 2025 =

Edition of British film awards

46th London Film Critics' Circle Awards

1 February 2026

Film of the Year:
One Battle After Another

British/Irish Film of the Year:
Pillion

The 46th London Film Critics' Circle Awards honoured the best in film of 2025, as chosen by the London Film Critics' Circle. All films are eligible if they were released in UK cinemas or on premiere streaming services between mid-February 2025 and mid-February 2026. The ceremony was held on 1 February 2026 at The May Fair Hotel in London.

The nominations were announced on 15 December 2025. Paul Thomas Anderson's action thriller film One Battle After Another led the nominees with nine, followed by Hamnet with eight and Sinners with seven. Additionally, Cynthia Erivo received the Derek Malcolm Award for Innovation, becoming the third recipient of the annual award, named in memory of English film critic Derek Malcolm. Mexican-born filmmaker Guillermo del Toro was honoured with the Dilys Powell Award for Excellence in Film, named after the British film critic and travel writer Dilys Powell.

English film critic Mark Kermode, also a member of the Critics' Circle, reprised his role as host.

== Winners and nominees ==
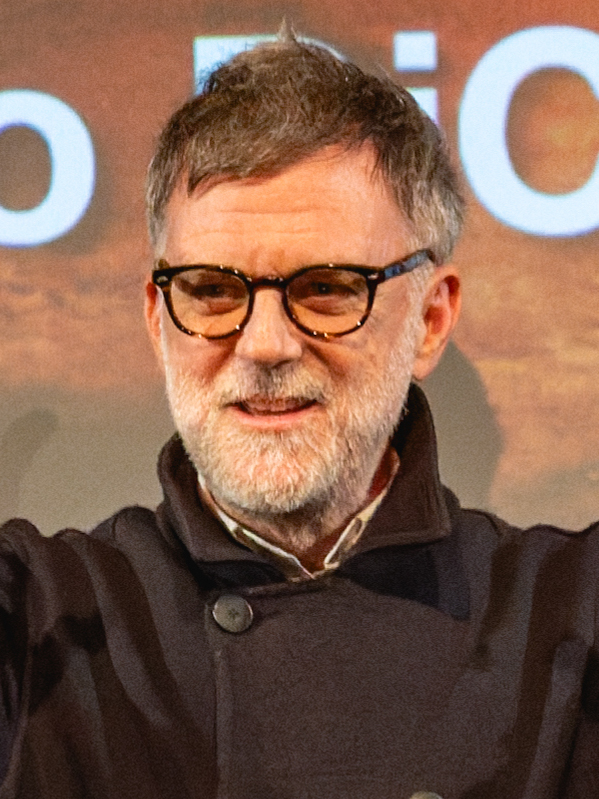
Paul Thomas Anderson, Director of the Year and Screenwriter of the Year winner

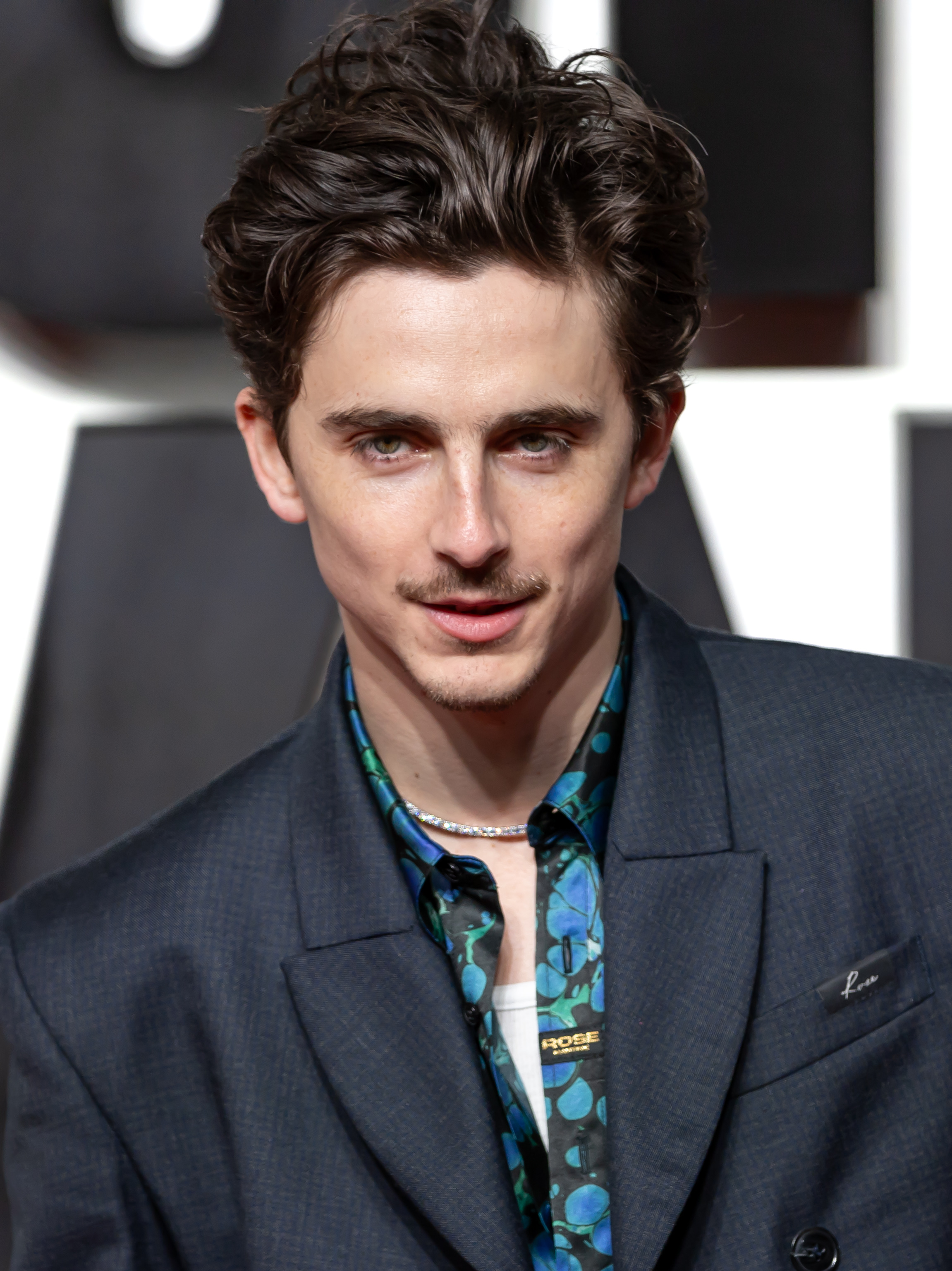
Timothée Chalamet, Actor of the Year winner

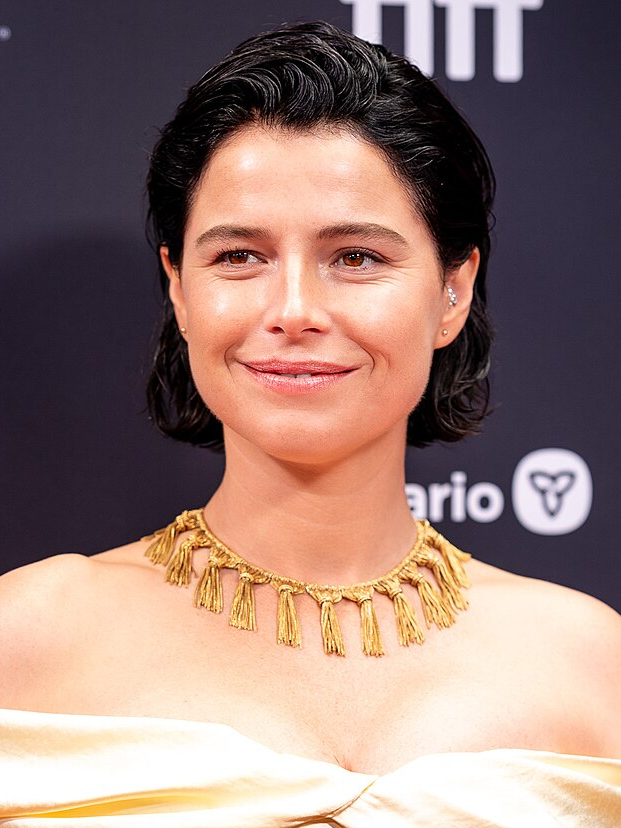
Jessie Buckley, Actress of the Year winner

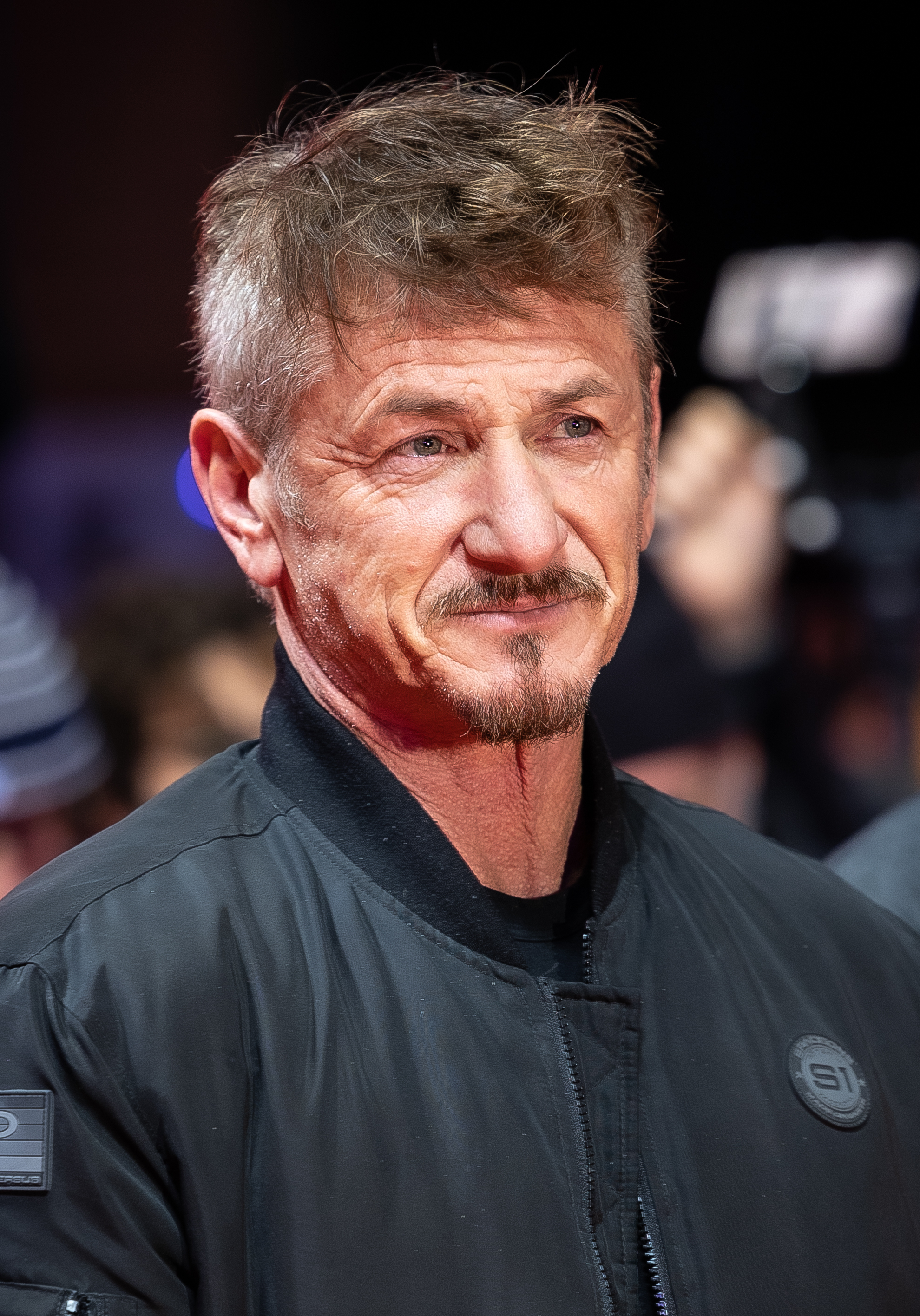
Sean Penn, Supporting Actor of the Year winner

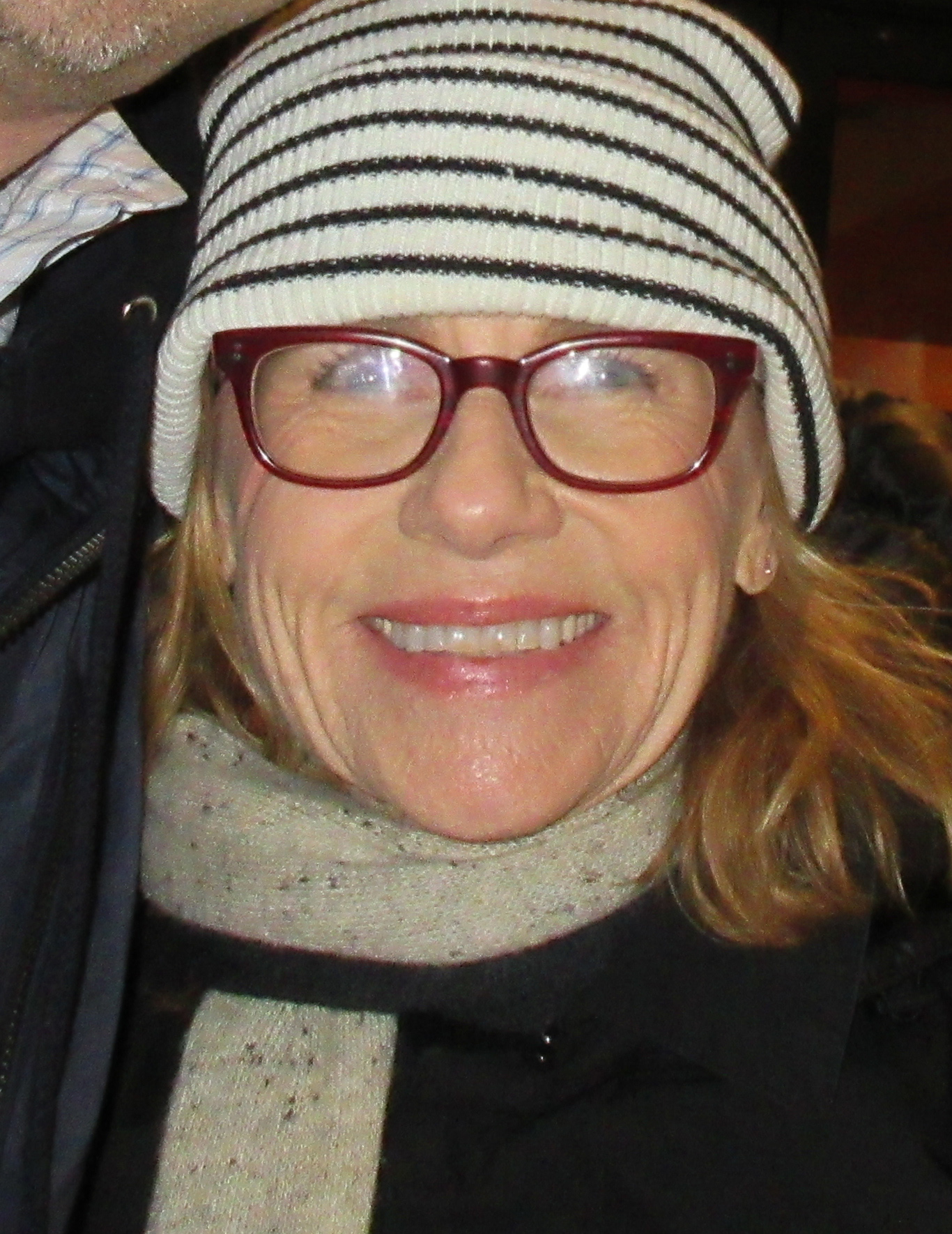
Amy Madigan, Supporting Actress of the Year winner

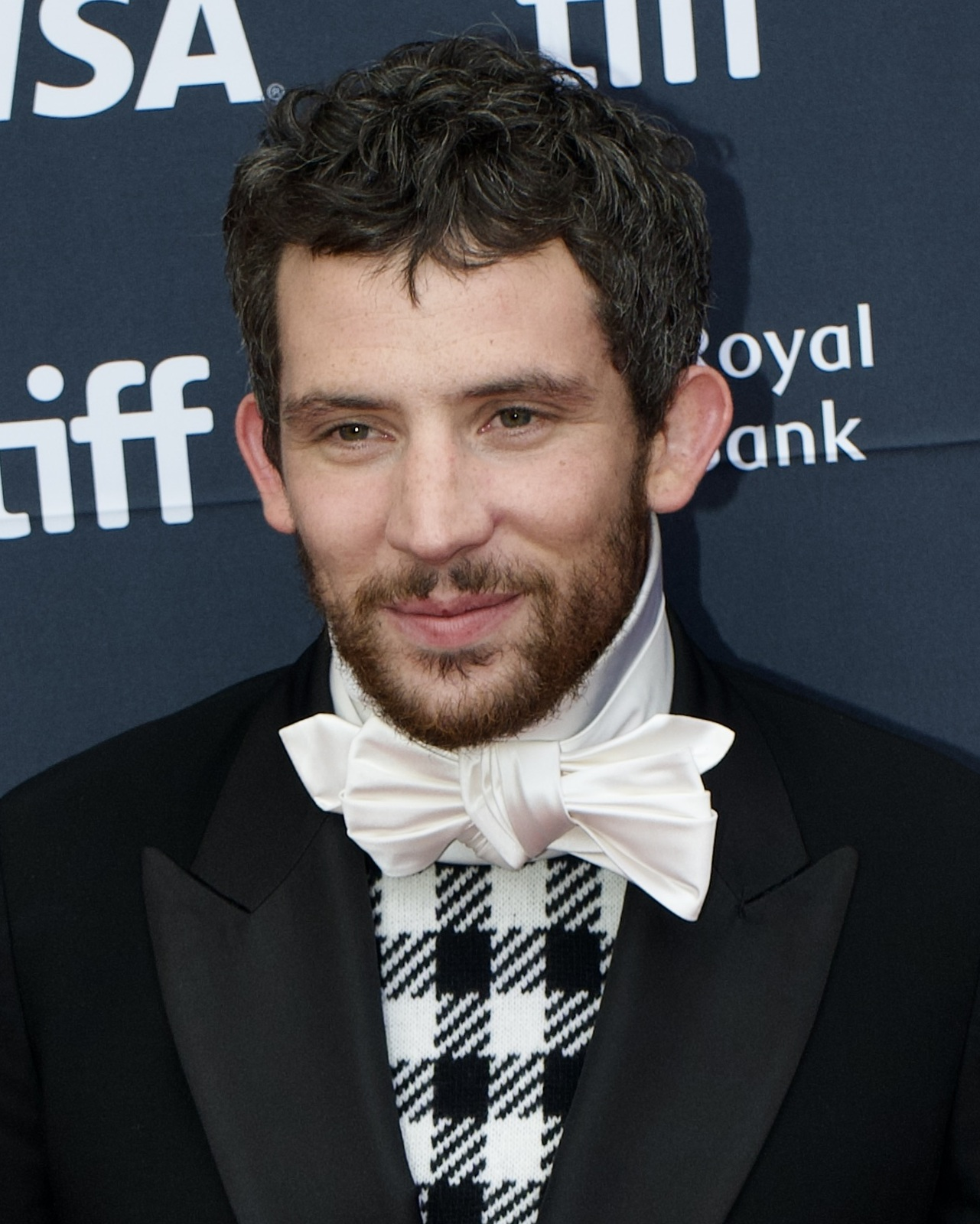
Josh O'Connor, British/Irish Performer of the Year winner

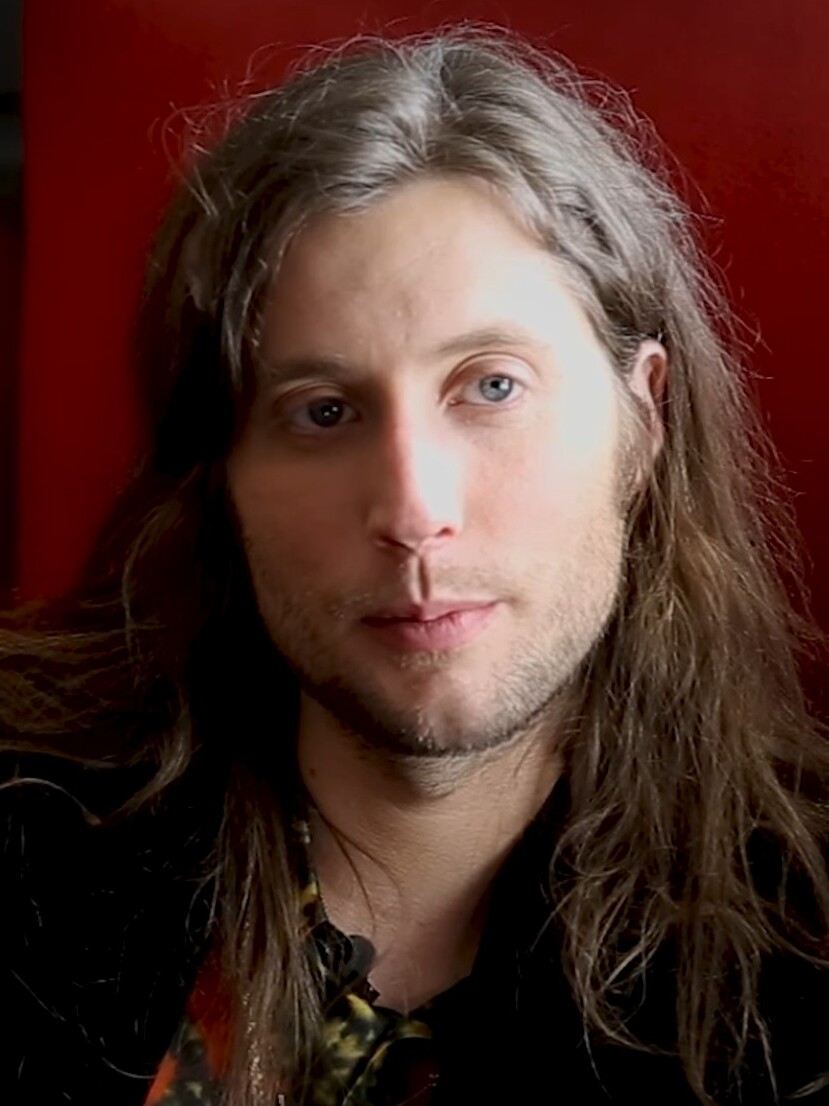
Ludwig Göransson, Technical Achievement Award winner

Winners are listed first and highlighted with boldface.

Film of the Year	Director of the Year
**One Battle After Another**; Hamnet; Marty Supreme; The Mastermind; Sentimental Value; Sinners; Sirāt; Sorry, Baby; Train Dreams; Weapons	**Paul Thomas Anderson – One Battle After Another**; Ryan Coogler – Sinners; Oliver Laxe – Sirāt; Josh Safdie – Marty Supreme; Chloé Zhao – Hamnet
Actor of the Year	Actress of the Year
**Timothée Chalamet – Marty Supreme as Marty Mauser**; Leonardo DiCaprio – One Battle After Another as Bob Ferguson; Ethan Hawke – Blue Moon as Lorenz Hart; Wagner Moura – The Secret Agent as Marcelo Alves / Armando Solimões / Fernando Solimões; Josh O'Connor – The Mastermind as James Blaine "J.B." Mooney	**Jessie Buckley – Hamnet as Agnes Shakespeare**; Rose Byrne – If I Had Legs I'd Kick You as Linda; Jennifer Lawrence – Die My Love as Grace; Renate Reinsve – Sentimental Value as Nora Borg; Eva Victor – Sorry, Baby as Agnes Ward
Supporting Actor of the Year	Supporting Actress of the Year
**Sean Penn – One Battle After Another as Colonel Steven J. Lockjaw**; Benicio del Toro – One Battle After Another as Sergio St. Carlos; Jacob Elordi – Frankenstein as The Creature; Delroy Lindo – Sinners as Delta Slim; Alexander Skarsgård – Pillion as Ray	**Amy Madigan – Weapons as Gladys**; Odessa A'zion – Marty Supreme as Rachel Mizler; Inga Ibsdotter Lilleaas – Sentimental Value as Agnes Borg Pettersen; Wunmi Mosaku – Sinners as Annie; Teyana Taylor – One Battle After Another as Perfidia Beverly Hills
Screenwriter of the Year	Foreign Language Film of the Year
**Paul Thomas Anderson – One Battle After Another**; Ryan Coogler – Sinners; Josh Safdie and Ronald Bronstein – Marty Supreme; Eva Victor – Sorry, Baby; Chloé Zhao and Maggie O'Farrell – Hamnet	**Sentimental Value**; It Was Just an Accident; No Other Choice; The Secret Agent; Sirāt
Documentary of the Year	The Attenborough Award: British/Irish Film of the Year
**The Perfect Neighbor**; Cover-Up; One to One: John & Yoko; Orwell: 2+2=5; Riefenstahl	**Pillion**; The Ballad of Wallis Island; Bugonia; Hamnet; I Swear
Breakthrough Performer of the Year	British/Irish Performer of the Year (for body of work)
**Robert Aramayo – I Swear / Palestine 36 as John Davidson / Captain Wingate**; Miles Caton – Sinners as Samuel "Sammie" Moore; Frank Dillane – Urchin / Harvest as Mike / Master Jordan; Chase Infiniti – One Battle After Another as Willa Ferguson; Eva Victor – Sorry, Baby as Agnes Ward	**Josh O'Connor – The Mastermind / The History of Sound / Wake Up Dead Man: A Knives Out Mystery as James Blaine "J.B." Mooney / David White / Fr. Jud Duplenticy**; Naomi Ackie – Sorry, Baby / Mickey 17 / The Thursday Murder Club as Lydie / Nasha Adjaya / Donna De Freitas; Robert Aramayo – I Swear / Palestine 36 as John Davidson / Captain Wingate; Jessie Buckley – Hamnet as Agnes Shakespeare; David Jonsson – Wasteman / The Long Walk as Taylor / Peter McVries
Young British/Irish Performer of the Year	The Philip French Award: Breakthrough British/Irish Filmmaker of the Year
**Alfie Williams – 28 Years Later as Spike**; Scott Ellis Watson – I Swear as Young John Davidson; Ebada Hassan – Brides as Doe; Jacobi Jupe – Hamnet as Hamnet Shakespeare; Noah Jupe – Hamnet / The Carpenter's Son as Hamlet / The Boy	**Harry Lighton – Pillion**; Tom Basden and Tim Key – The Ballad of Wallis Island; Laura Carreira – On Falling; Akinola Davies Jr. – My Father's Shadow; Harris Dickinson – Urchin
Animated Film of the Year	British/Irish Short Film of the Year
**KPop Demon Hunters**; Arco; Elio; Little Amélie or the Character of Rain; Zootropolis 2	**Neil Armstrong and the Langholmites – Duncan Cowles**; I Saw the Face of God in the Jet Wash – Mark Jenkin; Leaving Ikorodu in 1999 – Rashida Seriki; Milk – Naomi Waring; Two Black Boys in Paradise – Baz Sells
Technical Achievement Award
**Ludwig Göransson – Sinners (music)**; Laia Casanovas – Sirāt (sound design); Toni Froschhammer – Die My Love (editing); Julia Irribarria – The Ice Tower (production design); Andy Jurgensen – One Battle After Another (editing); Sabrina Krämer – Sound of Falling (costume design); Rob Mazurek – The Mastermind (music); Leo Satkovich, Melizah Wheat, and Jason Collins – Weapons (makeup and hairstyling); Adolpho Veloso – Train Dreams (cinematography); Jennifer Venditti – Marty Supreme (casting)
