= London Film Critics Circle Awards 2024 =

Edition of British film awards

45th London Film Critics' Circle Awards

2 February 2025

Film of the Year:
The Brutalist

British/Irish Film of the Year:
Conclave

The 45th London Film Critics' Circle Awards honoured the best in film of 2024, as chosen by the London Film Critics' Circle. All films are automatically eligible if they were released in UK cinemas or premiere via streaming service between mid-February 2024 and mid-February 2025. The ceremony was held on 2 February 2025 at The May Fair Hotel in London.

The nominations were announced on 19 December 2024. Anora and The Brutalist received the most nominations with seven each, followed by Conclave and The Substance with six apiece.

Actor Daniel Craig was presented with the Dilys Powell Award for Excellence in Film, named after the British film critic and travel writer Dilys Powell. Additionally, Zoe Saldaña was honoured with the Derek Malcolm Award for Innovation, becoming the second recipient of the annual award, named in memory of English film critic Derek Malcolm.

English film critic Mark Kermode, also a member of the Critics' Circle, reprised his role as host.

== Winners and nominees ==
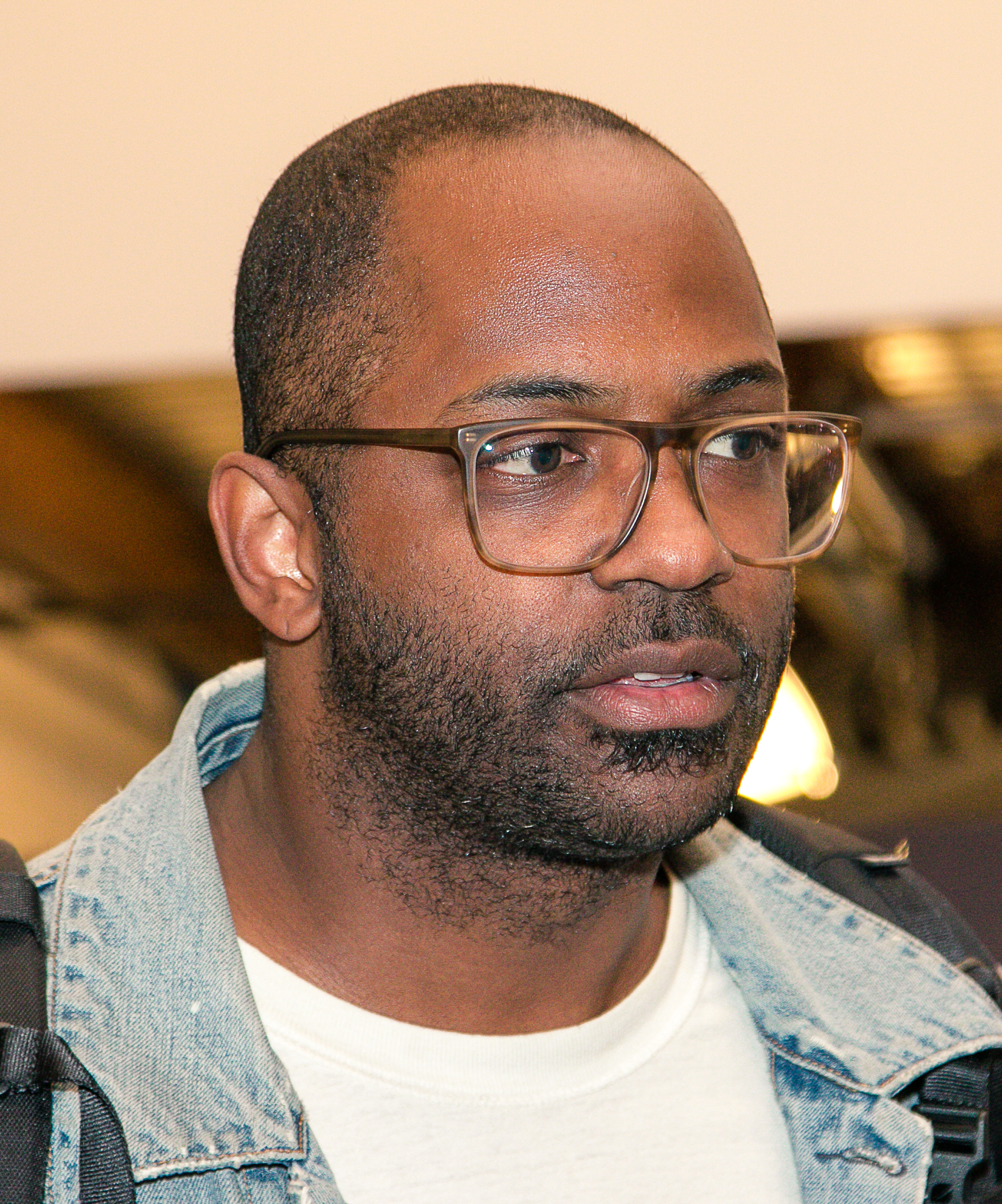
RaMell Ross, Director of the Year winner

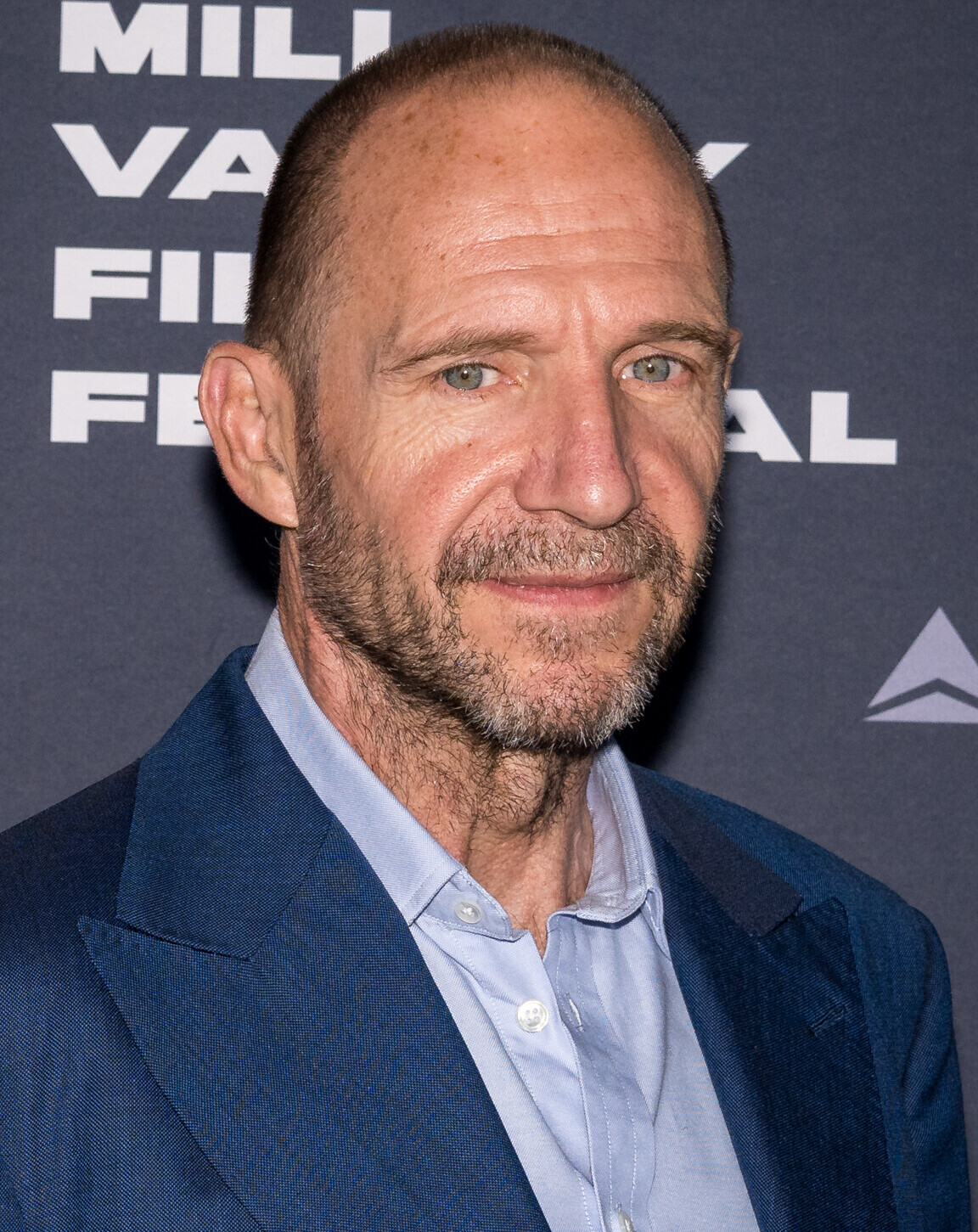
Ralph Fiennes, Actor of the Year winner

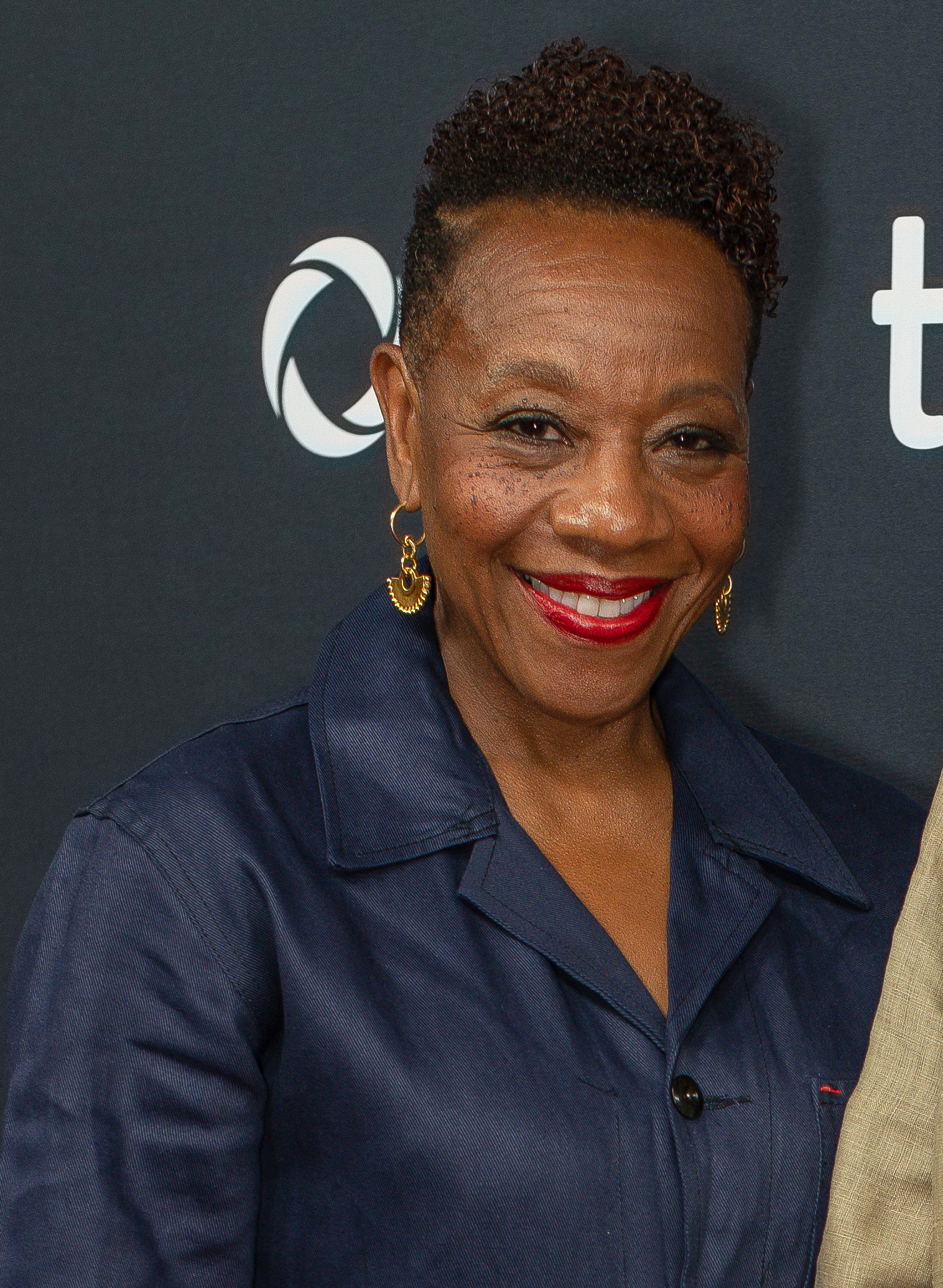
Marianne Jean-Baptiste, Actress of the Year winner

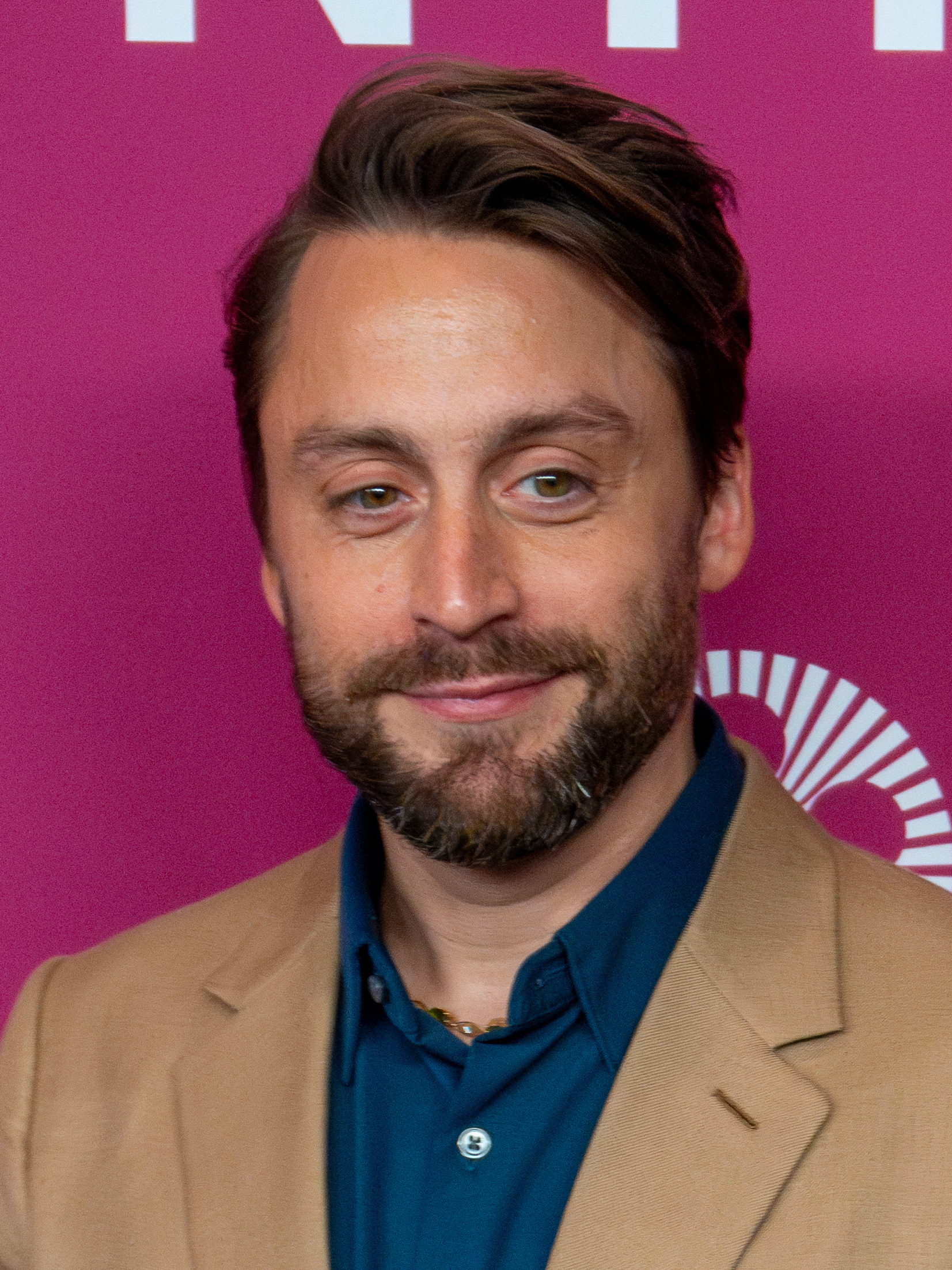
Kieran Culkin, Supporting Actor of the Year winner

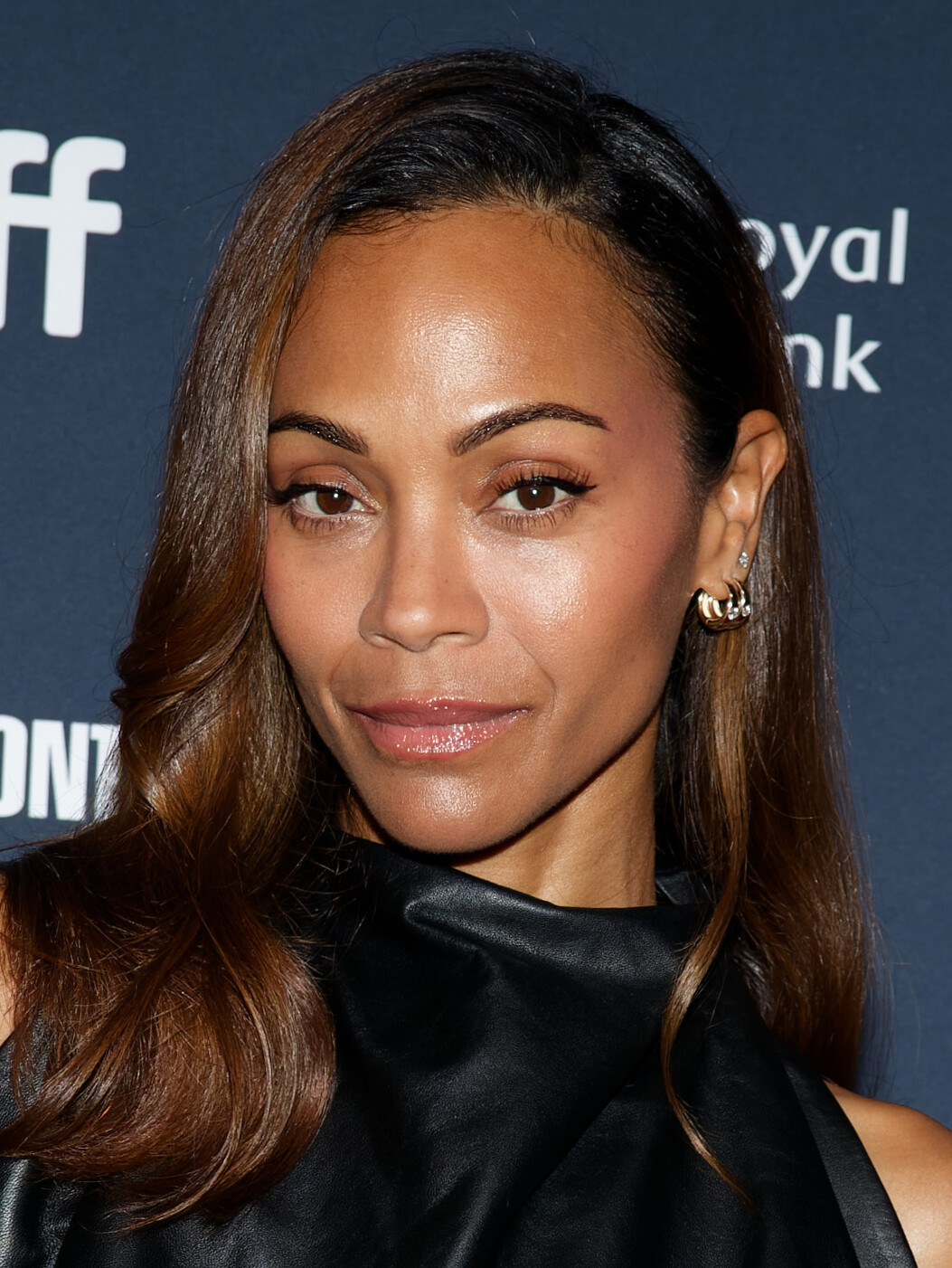
Zoe Saldaña, Supporting Actress of the Year winner

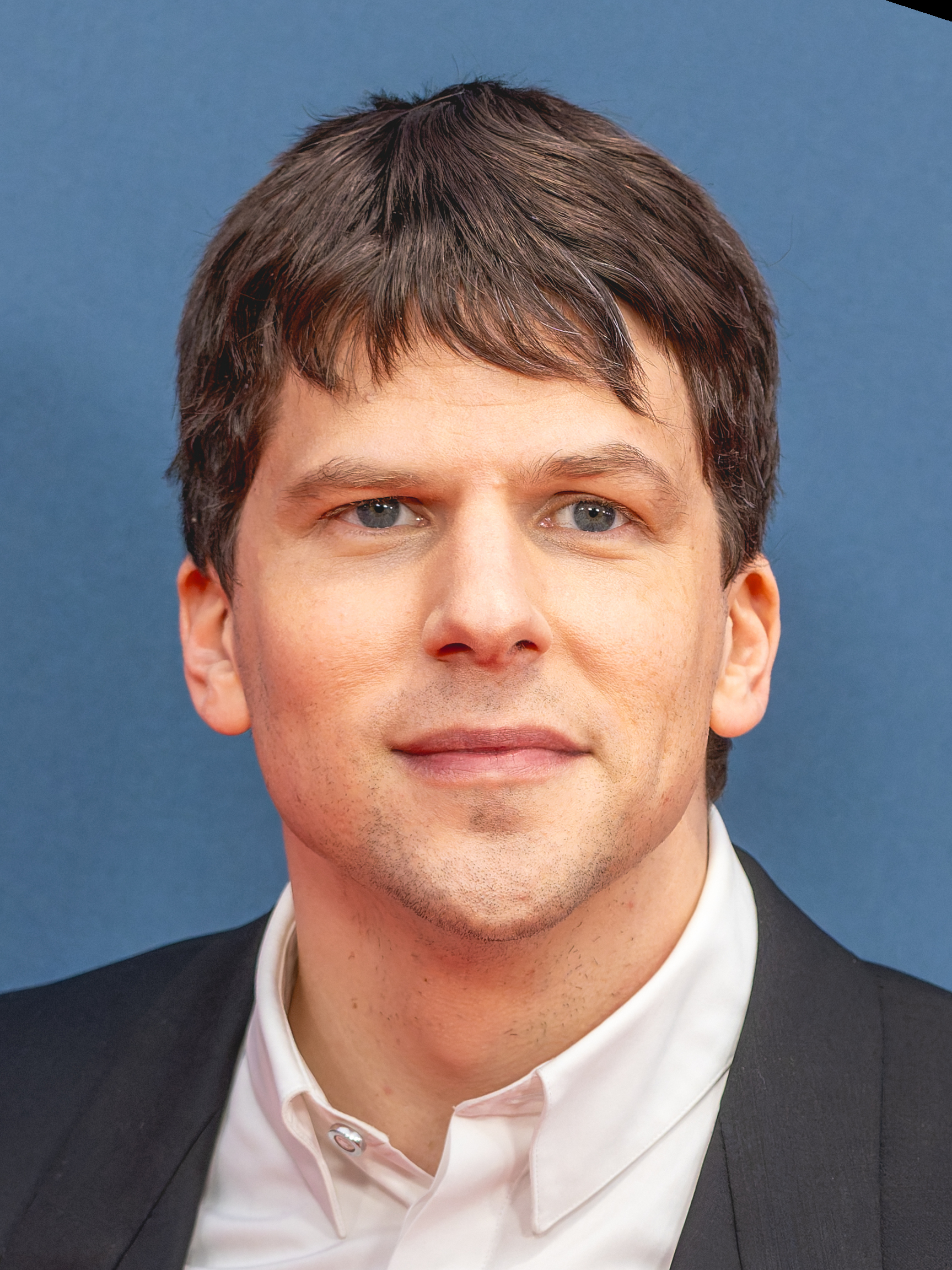
Jesse Eisenberg, Screenwriter of the Year winner

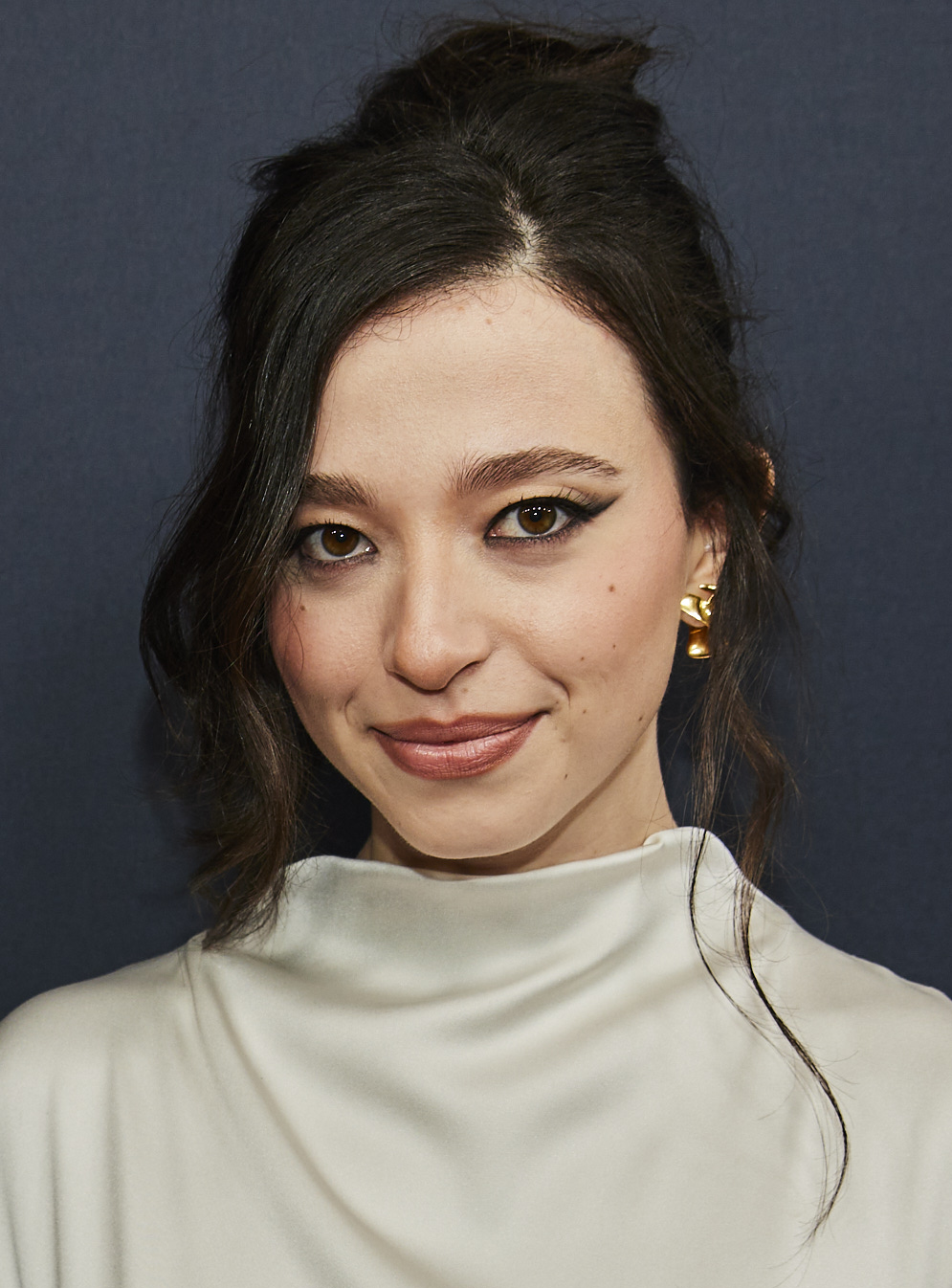
Mikey Madison, Breakthrough Performer of the Year winner

Winners are listed first and highlighted with boldface.

Film of the Year	Director of the Year
**The Brutalist**; All We Imagine as Light; Anora; La chimera; Conclave; Emilia Pérez; Kneecap; Nickel Boys; Nosferatu; The Substance	**RaMell Ross – Nickel Boys**; Sean Baker – Anora; Brady Corbet – The Brutalist; Coralie Fargeat – The Substance; Denis Villeneuve – Dune: Part Two
Actor of the Year	Actress of the Year
**Ralph Fiennes – Conclave as Cardinal Thomas Lawrence**; Adrien Brody – The Brutalist as László Tóth; Timothée Chalamet – A Complete Unknown as Bob Dylan; Daniel Craig – Queer as William Lee; Colman Domingo – Sing Sing as John "Divine G" Whitfield	**Marianne Jean-Baptiste – Hard Truths as Pansy Deacon**; Nicole Kidman – Babygirl as Romy Mathis; Mikey Madison – Anora as Anora "Ani" Mikheeva; Demi Moore – The Substance as Elisabeth Sparkle; Saoirse Ronan – The Outrun as Rona
Supporting Actor of the Year	Supporting Actress of the Year
**Kieran Culkin – A Real Pain as Benji Kaplan**; Yura Borisov – Anora as Igor; Guy Pearce – The Brutalist as Harrison Lee Van Buren Sr.; Jeremy Strong – The Apprentice as Roy Cohn; Denzel Washington – Gladiator II as Macrinus	**Zoe Saldaña – Emilia Pérez as Rita Mora Castro**; Michele Austin – Hard Truths as Chantelle; Danielle Deadwyler – The Piano Lesson as Berniece Charles; Margaret Qualley – The Substance as Sue; Isabella Rossellini – Conclave as Sister Agnes
Screenwriter of the Year	Foreign Language Film of the Year
**Jesse Eisenberg – A Real Pain**; Sean Baker – Anora; Brady Corbet and Mona Fastvold – The Brutalist; Coralie Fargeat – The Substance; Peter Straughan – Conclave	**All We Imagine as Light**; La chimera; Emilia Pérez; I'm Still Here; Kneecap
Documentary of the Year	The Attenborough Award: British/Irish Film of the Year
**No Other Land**; Dahomey; Grand Theft Hamlet; Made in England: The Films of Powell and Pressburger; Super/Man: The Christopher Reeve Story	**Conclave**; Bird; Hard Truths; Kneecap; Love Lies Bleeding
Breakthrough Performer of the Year	British/Irish Performer of the Year (for body of work)
**Mikey Madison – Anora as Anora "Ani" Mikheeva**; Marisa Abela – Back to Black as Amy Winehouse; Nykiya Adams – Bird as Bailey; Karla Sofía Gascón – Emilia Pérez as Emilia Pérez / Juan "Manitas" Del Monte; Maisy Stella – My Old Ass as Elliott LaBrant	**Saoirse Ronan – Blitz and The Outrun**; Cynthia Erivo – Drift and Wicked: Part I; Nicholas Hoult – Juror #2, Nosferatu, and The Order; Marianne Jean-Baptiste – The Book of Clarence and Hard Truths; Josh O'Connor – La chimera, Challengers, and Lee
Young British/Irish Performer of the Year	The Philip French Award: Breakthrough British/Irish Filmmaker of the Year
**Nykiya Adams – Bird**; Raffey Cassidy – The Brutalist and Kensuke's Kingdom; Elliott Heffernan – Blitz; Dan Hough – Speak No Evil; Alisha Weir – Abigail, Buffalo Kids, and Wicked Little Letters	**Rich Peppiatt – Kneecap**; Luna Carmoon – Hoard; Naqqash Khalid – In Camera; Amy Liptrot – The Outrun; Dev Patel – Monkey Man
Animated Film of the Year	British/Irish Short Film of the Year
**Wallace & Gromit: Vengeance Most Fowl**; Flow; Inside Out 2; Memoir of a Snail; The Wild Robot	**Wander to Wonder – Nina Gantz**; Iranian Yellow Pages – Anna Snowball; Karavidhe – Eoin Doran; Push – Elly Condron; We Beg to Differ – Ruairi Bradley
Technical Achievement Award
**Jomo Fray – Nickel Boys (cinematography)**; Judy Becker – The Brutalist (production design); Angus Bickerton – Beetlejuice Beetlejuice (visual effects); Jarin Blaschke – Nosferatu (cinematography); Clément Ducol and Camille – Emilia Pérez (music); Nick Emerson – Conclave (film editing); Stéphanie Guillon and Pierre-Olivier Persin – The Substance (makeup); Paul Lambert – Dune: Part Two (visual effects); Arianne Phillips – A Complete Unknown (costumes); Manny Siverio, Christopher Colombo, and Roberto Lopez – Anora (stunts)
