= London Film Critics' Circle Award for British Performer of the Year =

British film award

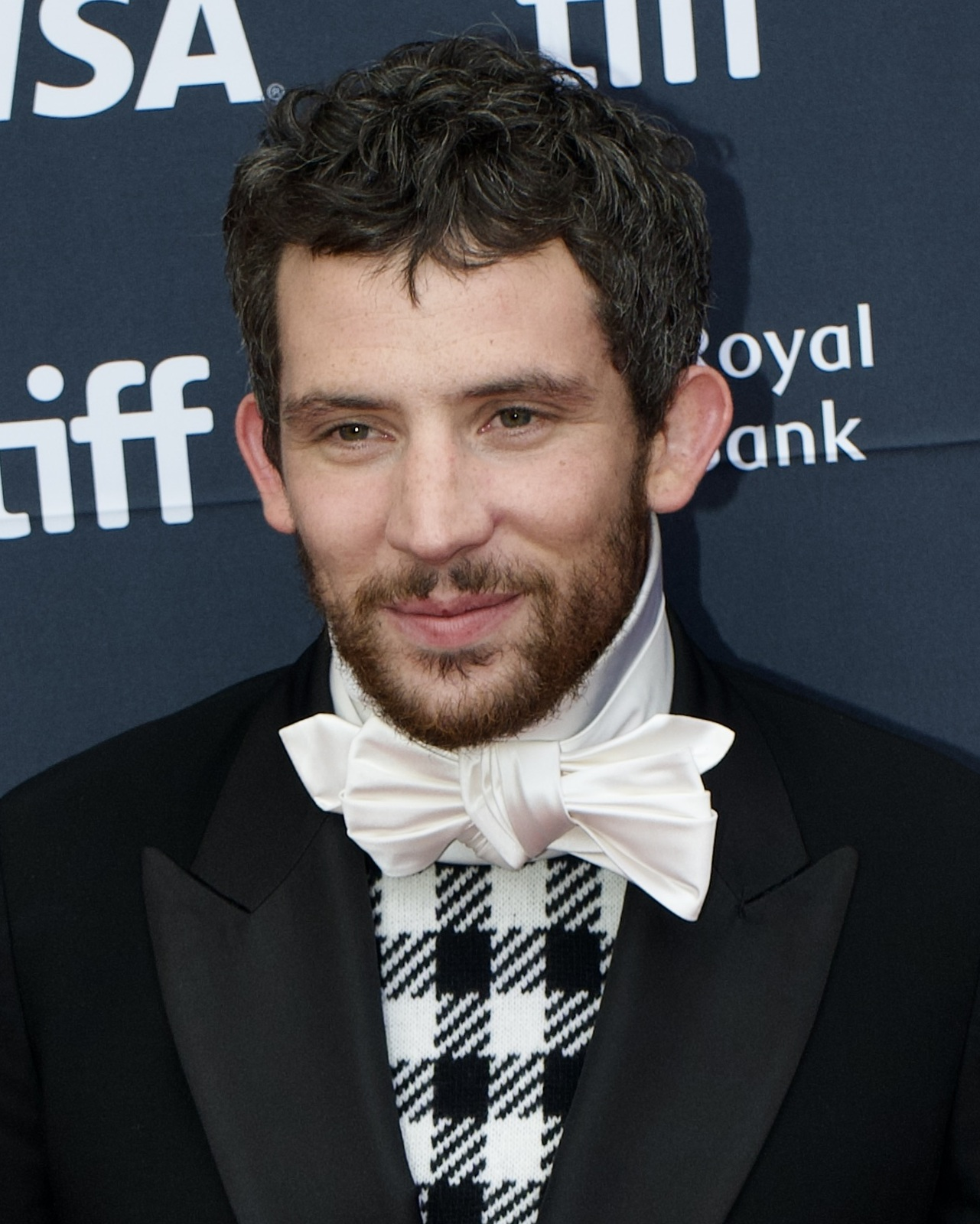
- The 2025 recipient: Josh O'Connor
- Awarded for: Best British/Irish Performer of the Year
- Country: England
- Presented by: London Film Critics' Circle
- First award: Paul Mescal (2023)
- Currently held by: Josh O'Connor (2025)
- Website: criticscircle.org

The London Film Critics' Circle Award for British/Irish Performer of the Year (for Body of Work) is an annual award given by the London Film Critics' Circle.

== Winners and nominees ==
=== 2020s ===
Year	Performer	Body of Work
2023	Paul Mescal	All of Us Strangers, God's Creatures, Foe, and Carmen
2023	Carey Mulligan	Maestro and Saltburn
2023	Cillian Murphy	Oppenheimer
2023	Andrew Scott	All of Us Strangers
2023	Tilda Swinton	The Eternal Daughter, The Killer, and Asteroid City
2024	Saoirse Ronan	Blitz and The Outrun
2024	Cynthia Erivo	Drift and Wicked
2024	Nicholas Hoult	Juror No. 2, Nosferatu, and The Order
2024	Marianne Jean-Baptiste	The Book of Clarence and Hard Truths
2024	Josh O'Connor	La chimera, Challengers, and Lee
2025	Josh O'Connor	The Mastermind, The History of Sound, and Wake Up Dead Man: A Knives Out Mystery
2025	Naomi Ackie	Sorry, Baby; Mickey 17, and The Thursday Murder Club
2025	Robert Aramayo	I Swear and Palestine 36
2025	Jessie Buckley	Hamnet
2025	David Jonsson	Wasteman and The Long Walk
