= London Film Critics' Circle Award for Supporting Actress of the Year =

British film award

London Film Critics Circle Award for Best Supporting Actress
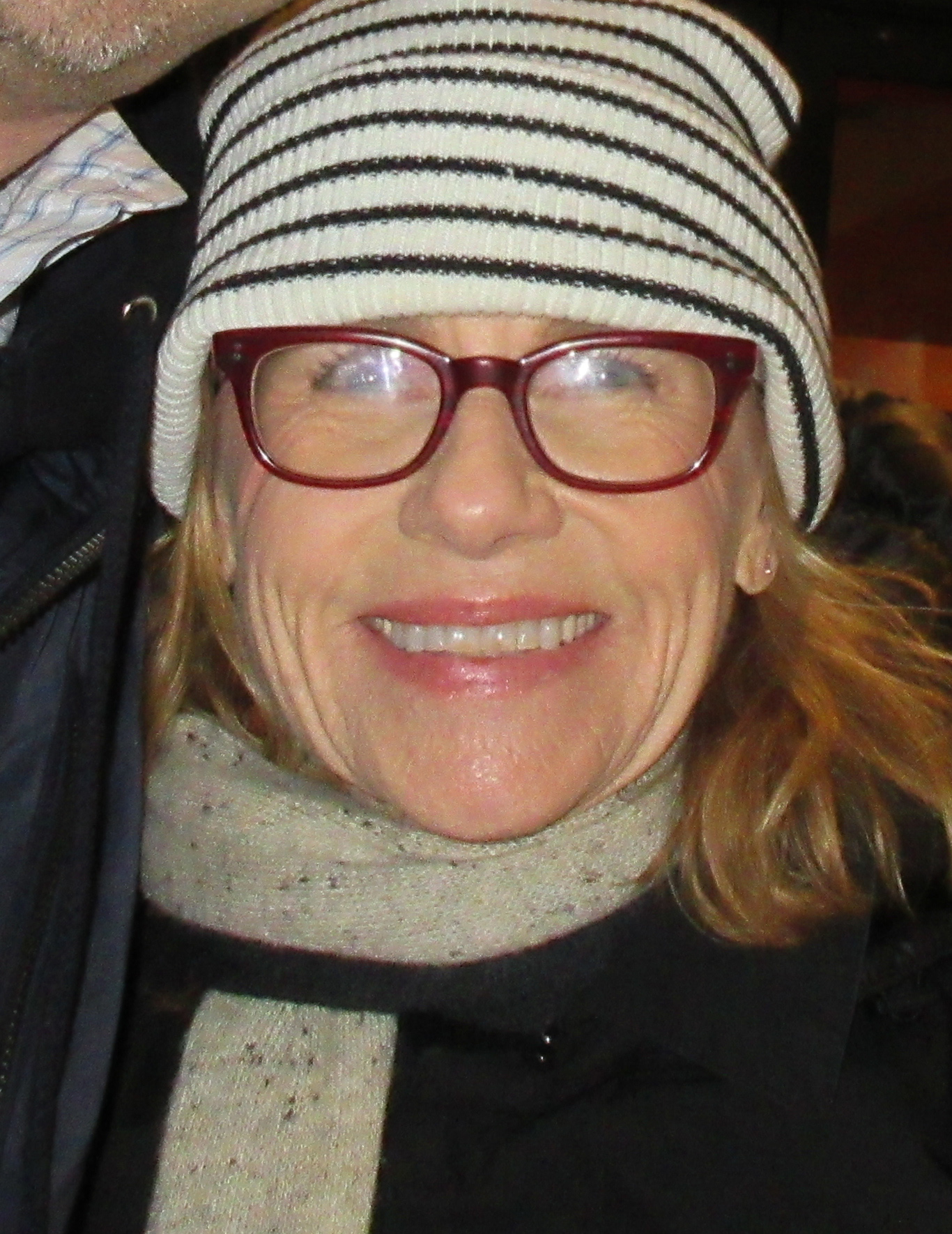
- The 2025 recipient: Amy Madigan
- Awarded for: Best Performance by an Actress in a Supporting Role
- Country: England
- Presented by: London Film Critics Circle
- First award: Sareh Bayat; A Separation (2011)
- Currently held by: Amy Madigan; Weapons (2025)
- Website: criticscircle.org

The London Film Critics Circle Award for Supporting Actress of the Year is an annual award given by the London Film Critics Circle.

== Winners ==
=== 2010s ===
Year	Winner	Film	Role
2011	Sareh Bayat	A Separation	Razieh
2012	Anne Hathaway	Les Misérables	Fantine
2013	Lupita Nyong'o	12 Years a Slave	Patsey
2014	Patricia Arquette	Boyhood	Olivia Evans
2015	Kate Winslet	Steve Jobs	Joanna Hoffman
2016	Naomie Harris	Moonlight	Paula Harris
2017	Lesley Manville	Phantom Thread	Cyril Woodcock
2017	Lily Gladstone	Certain Women	Jamie
2017	Holly Hunter	The Big Sick	Beth Gardner
2017	Allison Janney	I, Tonya	LaVona Golden
2017	Laurie Metcalf	Lady Bird	Marion McPherson
2018	Rachel Weisz	The Favourite	Sarah Churchill
2018	Elizabeth Debicki	Widows	Alice
2018	Cynthia Erivo	Bad Times at the El Royale	Darlene Sweet
2018	Claire Foy	First Man	Janet Armstrong
2018	Regina King	If Beale Street Could Talk	Sharon Rivers
2019	Laura Dern	Marriage Story	Nora Fanshaw
2019	Jennifer Lopez	Hustlers	Ramona Vega
2019	Florence Pugh	Little Women	Amy March
2019	Margot Robbie	Bombshell	Kayla Pospisil
2019	Tilda Swinton	The Souvenir	Rosalind

=== 2020s ===
Year	Winner	Film	Role
2020	Maria Bakalova	Borat Subsequent Moviefilm	Tutar Sagdiyev
2020	Ellen Burstyn	Pieces of a Woman	Elizabeth Weiss
2020	Essie Davis	Babyteeth	Anna Finlay
2020	Jennifer Ehle	Saint Maud	Amanda Köhl
2020	Amanda Seyfried	Mank	Marion Davies
2021	Ruth Negga	Passing	Clare Bellew
2021	Jessie Buckley	The Lost Daughter	Young Leda
2021	Ariana DeBose	West Side Story	Anita
2021	Kirsten Dunst	The Power of the Dog	Rose Gordon
2021	Rita Moreno	West Side Story	Valentina
2022	Kerry Condon	The Banshees of Inisherin	Siobhán Súilleabháin
2022	Hong Chau	The Whale	Liz
2022	Dolly de Leon	Triangle of Sadness	Abigail
2022	Nina Hoss	Tár	Sharon Goodnow
2022	Guslagie Malanda	Saint Omer	Laurence Coly
2023	Da'Vine Joy Randolph	The Holdovers	Mary Lamb
2023	Claire Foy	All of Us Strangers	Adam's mother
2023	Sandra Hüller	The Zone of Interest	Hedwig Höss
2023	Julianne Moore	May December	Gracie Atherton-Yoo
2023	Rosamund Pike	Saltburn	Lady Elspeth Catton
2024	Zoe Saldaña	Emilia Pérez	Rita Mora Castro
2024	Michele Austin	Hard Truths	Chantelle
2024	Danielle Deadwyler	The Piano Lesson	Berniece
2024	Margaret Qualley	The Substance	Sue
2024	Isabella Rossellini	Conclave	Sister Agnes
2025	Amy Madigan	Weapons	Gladys
2025	Odessa A'zion	Marty Supreme	Rachel Mizler
2025	Inga Ibsdotter Lilleaas	Sentimental Value	Agnes Borg Pettersen
2025	Wunmi Mosaku	Sinners	Annie
2025	Teyana Taylor	One Battle After Another	Perfidia Beverly Hills
