= London Film Critics Circle Awards 2023 =

Edition of British film awards

44th London Film Critics' Circle Awards

4 February 2024

Film of the Year:
The Zone of Interest

British/Irish Film of the Year:
All of Us Strangers

The 44th London Film Critics' Circle Awards honoured the best in film of 2023, as chosen by the London Film Critics' Circle. All films are automatically eligible if they were released in UK cinemas or premiere via streaming service between mid-February 2023 and mid-February 2024. The ceremony was held on 4 February 2024 at The May Fair Hotel in London. The nominations were announced on 20 December 2023 by actors Jing Lusi and Ényì Okoronkwo. All of Us Strangers received the most nominations with nine, followed by Oppenheimer with seven.

Actor Jeffrey Wright was presented with the Dilys Powell Award for Excellence in Film, named after the British film critic and travel writer Dilys Powell. Additionally, Colman Domingo received the inaugural Derek Malcolm Award for Innovation; the award is named in memory of British critic and film historian Derek Malcolm, who died on 15 July 2023 at age 91.

English film critic Mark Kermode, also a member of the Critics' Circle, hosted the ceremony.

== Winners and nominees ==
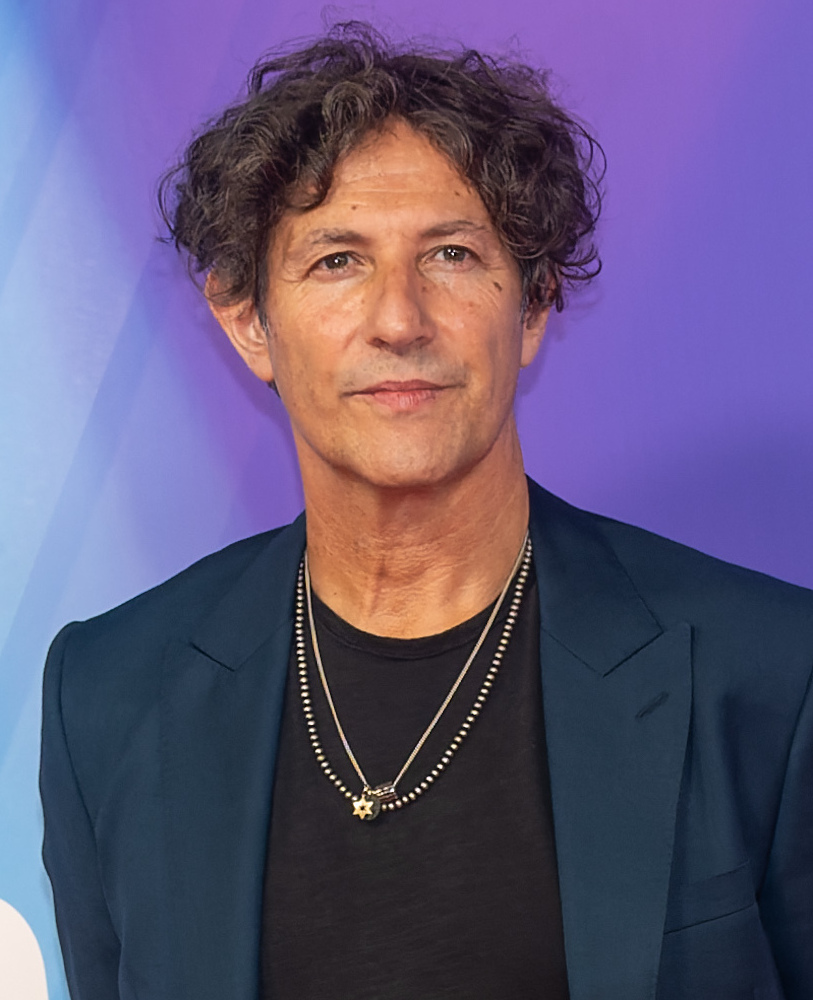
Jonathan Glazer, Director of the Year winner

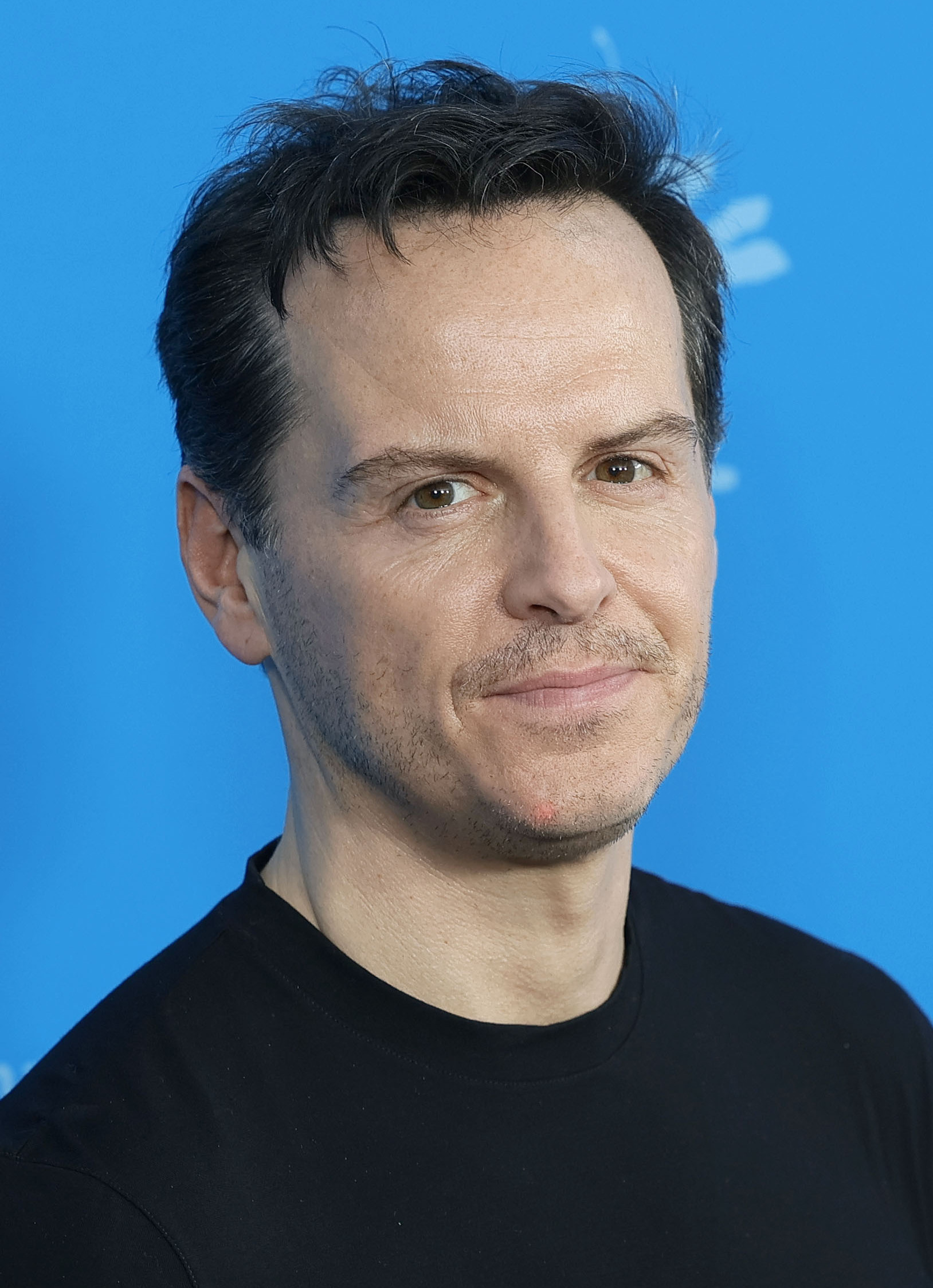
Andrew Scott, Actor of the Year winner

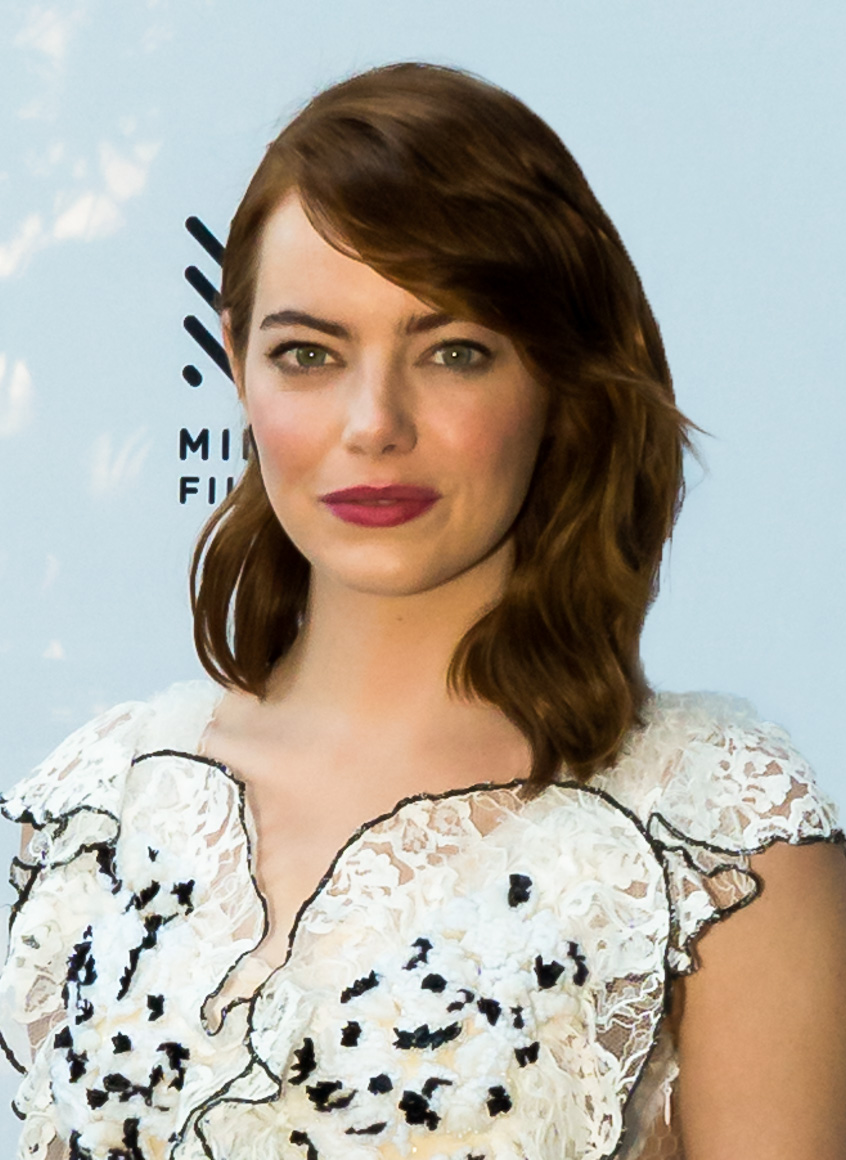
Emma Stone, Actress of the Year winner

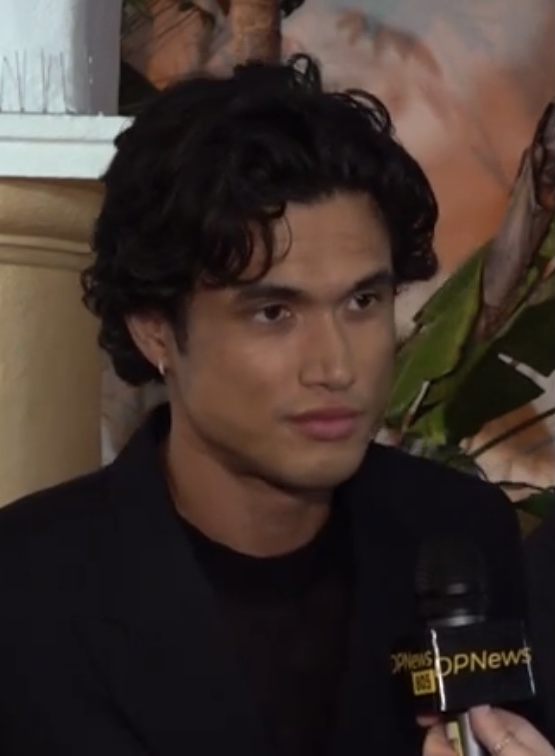
Charles Melton, Supporting Actor of the Year winner

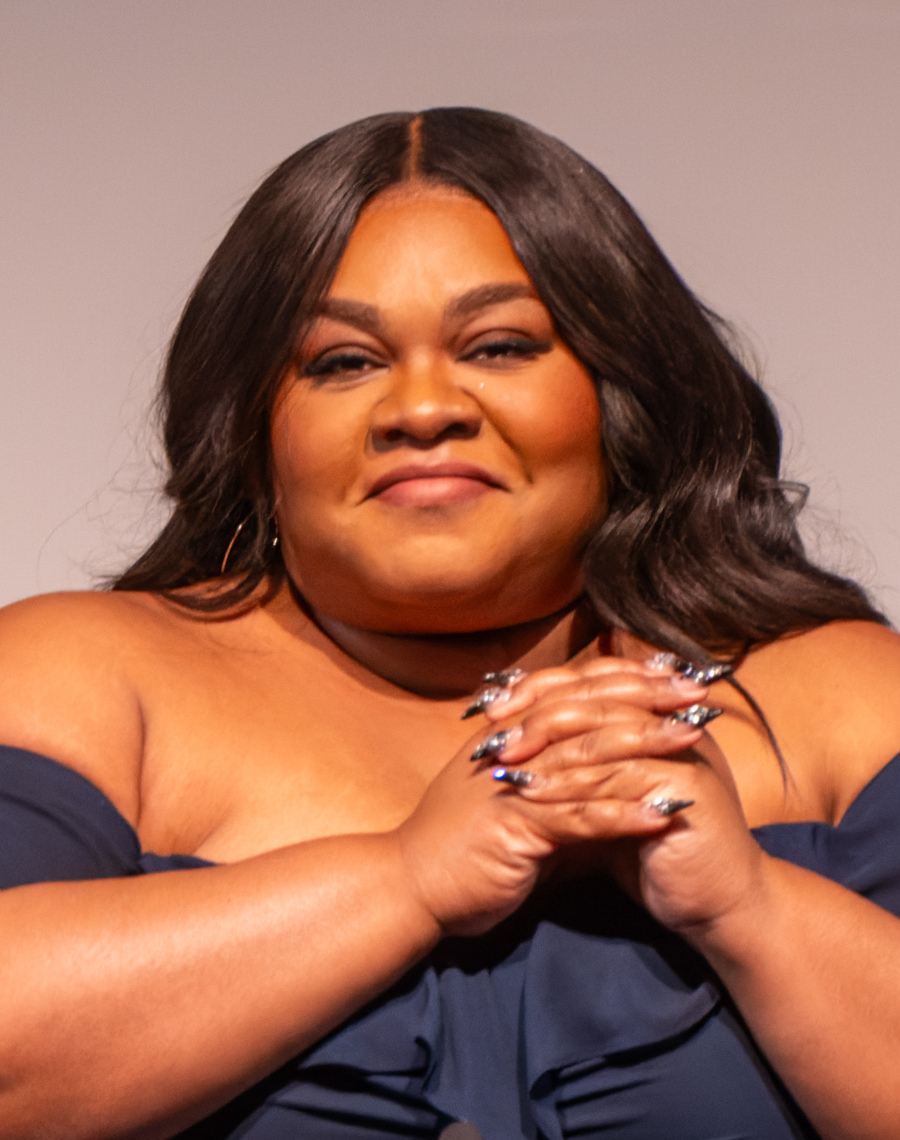
Da'Vine Joy Randolph, Supporting Actress of the Year winner

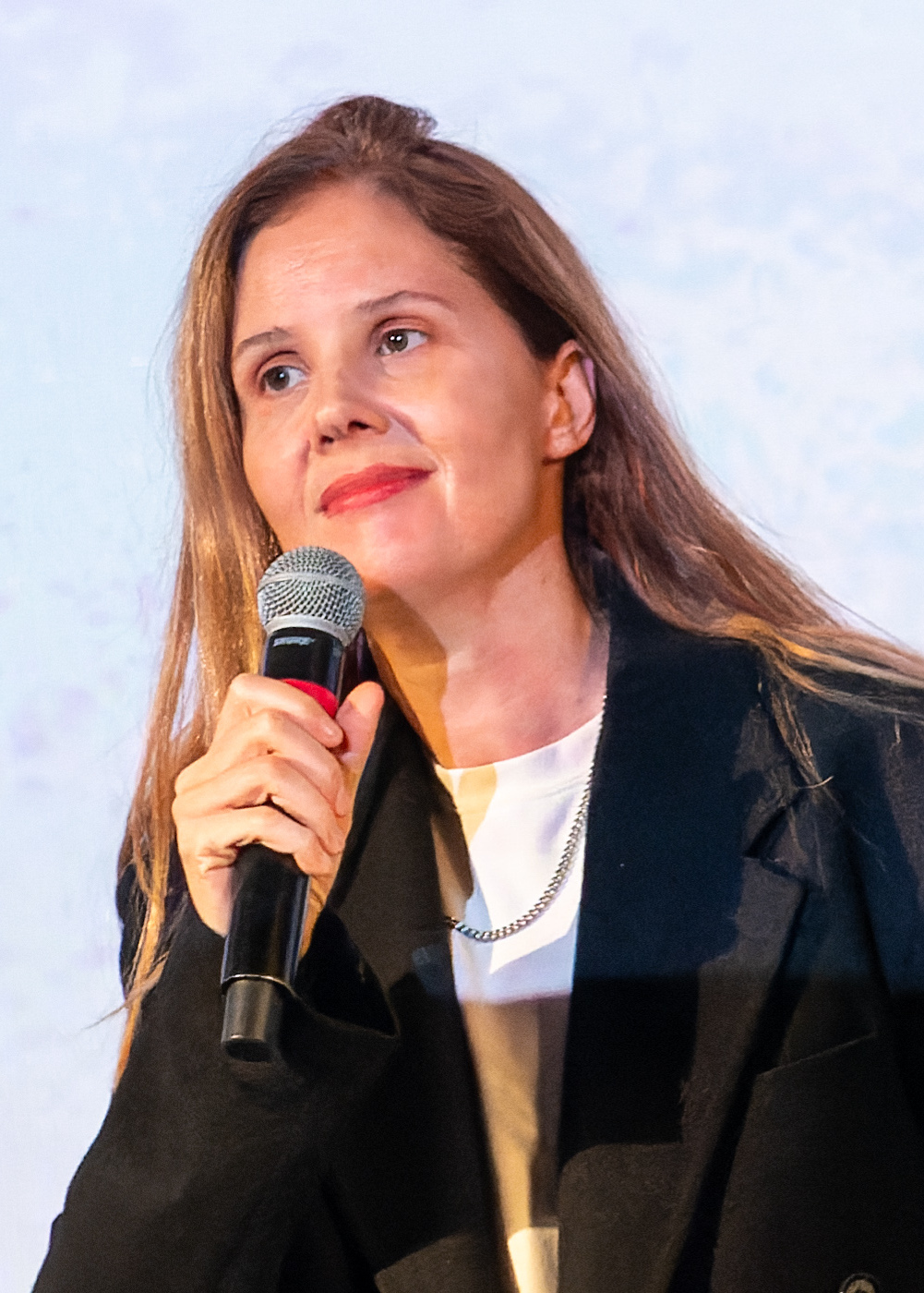
Justine Triet, Screenwriter of the Year co-winner

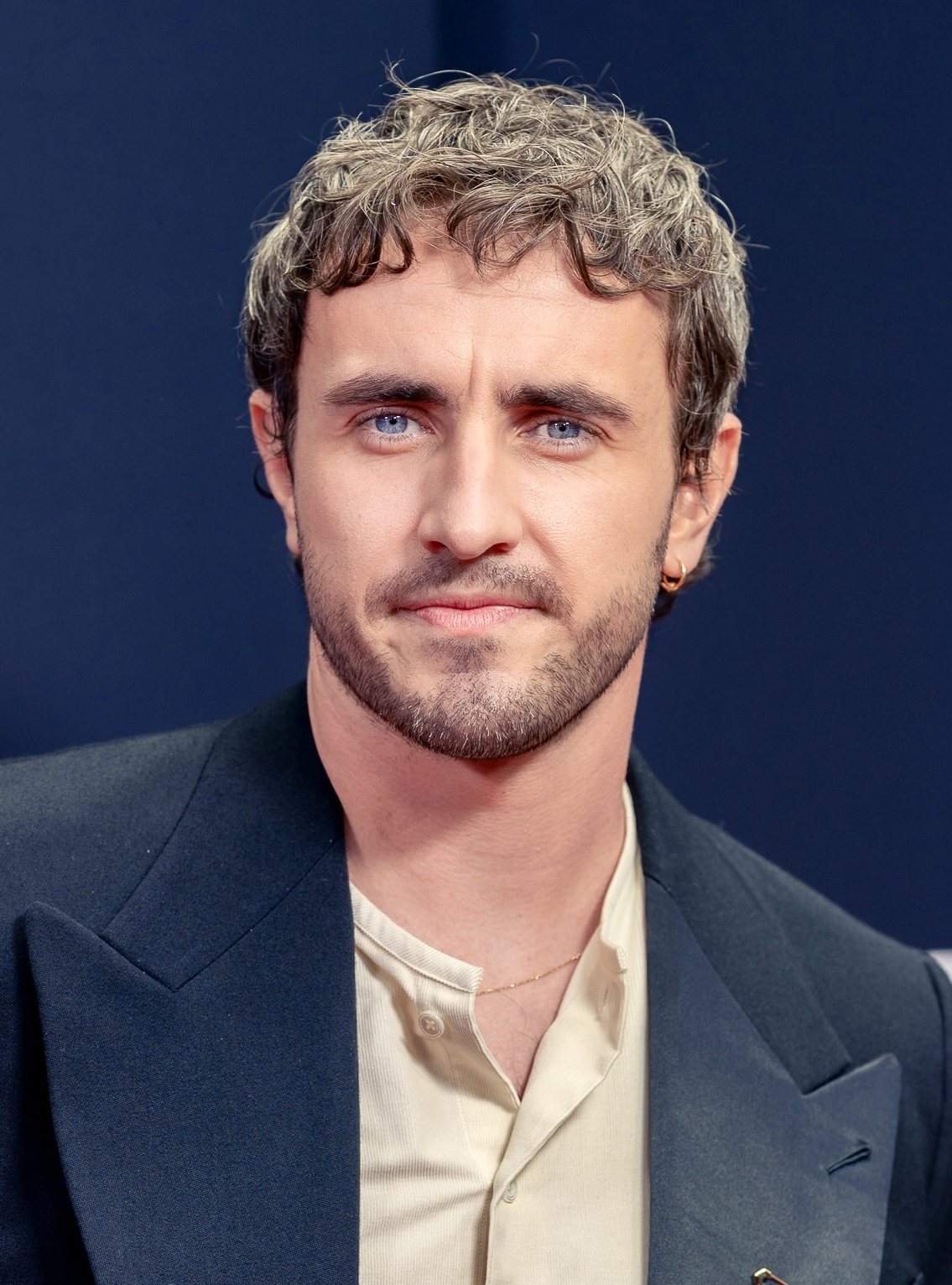
Paul Mescal, British/Irish Performer of the Year winner

Winners are listed first and highlighted with boldface.

Film of the Year	Director of the Year
**The Zone of Interest**; All of Us Strangers; Anatomy of a Fall; Barbie; The Holdovers; Killers of the Flower Moon; May December; Oppenheimer; Past Lives; Poor Things	**Jonathan Glazer – The Zone of Interest**; Greta Gerwig – Barbie; Yorgos Lanthimos – Poor Things; Christopher Nolan – Oppenheimer; Martin Scorsese – Killers of the Flower Moon
Actor of the Year	Actress of the Year
**Andrew Scott – All of Us Strangers as Adam**; Bradley Cooper – Maestro as Leonard Bernstein; Paul Giamatti – The Holdovers as Paul Hunham; Cillian Murphy – Oppenheimer as J. Robert Oppenheimer; Jeffrey Wright – American Fiction as Thelonious "Monk" Ellison	**Emma Stone – Poor Things as Bella Baxter**; Lily Gladstone – Killers of the Flower Moon as Mollie Burkhart; Sandra Hüller – Anatomy of a Fall as Sandra Voyter; Greta Lee – Past Lives as Nora Moon; Carey Mulligan – Maestro as Felicia Montealegre
Supporting Actor of the Year	Supporting Actress of the Year
**Charles Melton – May December as Joe Yoo**; Robert Downey Jr. – Oppenheimer as Lewis Strauss; Ryan Gosling – Barbie as Ken; Paul Mescal – All of Us Strangers as Harry; Mark Ruffalo – Poor Things as Duncan Wedderburn	**Da'Vine Joy Randolph – The Holdovers as Mary Lamb**; Claire Foy – All of Us Strangers as Mum; Sandra Hüller – The Zone of Interest as Hedwig Höss; Julianne Moore – May December as Gracie; Rosamund Pike – Saltburn as Lady Elspeth Catton
Screenwriter of the Year	Foreign Language Film of the Year
**Justine Triet and Arthur Harari – Anatomy of a Fall**; Andrew Haigh – All of Us Strangers; Greta Gerwig and Noah Baumbach – Barbie; Christopher Nolan – Oppenheimer; Celine Song – Past Lives	**Past Lives**; Anatomy of a Fall; The Boy and the Heron; Fallen Leaves; The Zone of Interest
Documentary of the Year	The Attenborough Award: British/Irish Film of the Year
**20 Days in Mariupol**; Beyond Utopia; The Eternal Memory; Scala!!!; Still: A Michael J. Fox Movie	**All of Us Strangers**; How to Have Sex; Poor Things; Rye Lane; The Zone of Interest
Breakthrough Performer of the Year	British/Irish Performer of the Year (for body of work)
**Mia McKenna-Bruce – How to Have Sex as Tara**; Greta Lee – Past Lives as Nora Moon; Vivian Oparah – Rye Lane as Yas; Dominic Sessa – The Holdovers as Angus Tully; Cailee Spaeny – Priscilla as Priscilla Presley	**Paul Mescal – All of Us Strangers, God's Creatures, Foe, and Carmen**; Carey Mulligan – Maestro and Saltburn; Cillian Murphy – Oppenheimer; Andrew Scott – All of Us Strangers; Tilda Swinton – The Eternal Daughter, The Killer, and Asteroid City
Young British/Irish Performer of the Year	The Philip French Award: Breakthrough British/Irish Filmmaker of the Year
**Lola Campbell – Scrapper as Georgie**; Jaeden Boadilla – Raging Grace as Grace; Le'Shantey Bonsu – Girl as Ama; Samuel Bottomley – How to Have Sex as Paddy; Temilola Olatunbosun – Pretty Red Dress as Kenisha	**Molly Manning Walker – How to Have Sex**; Raine Allen-Miller – Rye Lane; Sam H. Freeman and Ng Choon Ping – Femme; Nida Manzoor – Polite Society; Charlotte Regan – Scrapper
Animated Film of the Year	British/Irish Short Film of the Year
**The Boy and the Heron**; Robot Dreams; Spider-Man: Across the Spider-Verse; Suzume; Teenage Mutant Ninja Turtles: Mutant Mayhem	**The Veiled City – Natalie Cubides-Brady**; For People in Trouble – Alex Lawther; Muna – Warda Mohamed; Outlets – Duncan Cowles; Predators – Jack King
Technical Achievement Award
**Mica Levi and Johnnie Burn – The Zone of Interest (music & sound)**; Kharmel Cochrane – Saltburn (casting); Kahleen Crawford – All of Us Strangers (casting); Sarah Greenwood – Barbie (production design); Andrew Jackson – Oppenheimer (visual effects); Kôji Kasamatsu – The First Slam Dunk (sound design); Shabier Kirchner – Past Lives (cinematography); Thelma Schoonmaker – Killers of the Flower Moon (film editing); Eugene Souleiman – Medusa Deluxe (makeup & hair); Mathilde Van de Moortel – Full Time (film editing); Holly Waddington – Poor Things (costumes)
