= Scala!!! =

2023 British documentary film

- Directed by: Ali Catterall; Jane Giles
- Produced by: Andrew Starke; Alan Marke; Jim Reid
- Cinematography: Sarah Appleton
- Edited by: Andrew Starke; Edward Mills
- Music by: Barry Adamson
- Release date: October 14, 2023 (BFI London Film Festival)
- Running time: 96 minutes
- Country: United Kingdom
- Language: English

Scala!!! Or, the Incredibly Strange Rise and Fall of the World's Wildest Cinema and How It Influenced a Mixed-up Generation of Weirdos and Misfits, or simply Scala!!!, is a 2023 British documentary film directed by Ali Catterall and Jane Giles.

The film is based on the Kraszna-Krausz award-winning 2018 book Scala Cinema 1978-1993 by Jane Giles, and documents the history of the Scala, a former cinema turned nightclub and live music venue in Pentonville Road, London, England, near King's Cross railway station.

== Production ==
The film received initial funding from the BFI Doc Society Fund (awarding National Lottery funding) in April 2020, followed by an additional £40,416 raised through a successful crowdfunder on Kickstarter (far exceeding the initial target of £25,000).

Between May–August 2021 the producers filmed 50 interviews with former members of the Scala audience 1978–1993, including: filmmakers Mary Harron, Isaac Julien, John Waters, and Ben Wheatley; musicians Barry Adamson (of Nick Cave and the Bad Seeds) and Matt Johnson (of The The); broadcasters Adam Buxton and James O’Brien; comedian Stewart Lee; LGBT rights activist Lisa Power; and illustrator Graham Humphreys.

== Release ==
The film premiered at the BFI Southbank and the Prince Charles Cinema in October 2023, as part of the BFI London Film Festival. This was followed by a public release on 5 January 2024 and digital release on BFI Player and Blu-ray on 22 January 2024.

== Reception ==
On release, critics praised the documentary for its rich re-telling of the ups and downs of the cult cinema venue. Peter Bradshaw of The Guardian described it as a “heartfelt tribute to an icon of independent cinema […] richly enjoyable and informative”. Jonathan Romney of the Financial Times called it an “ode to London’s lost utopia of cinema-going”. In his introduction to the film on BFI Player, Mark Kermode said Scala!!! “celebrates the diversity of people who were drawn to the cinema—people of all ages, races, genders, and sexualities—all of whom found in it a safe haven, a place where they could be themselves, in the company of some of the most eye-popping movies ever made”, and in his review on Kermode & Mayo’s Take, he called the film “a riotously entertaining yet also an impressively serious account” of the infamous venue.

Scala!!! was nominated for Documentary of the Year in the London Film Critics Circle Awards 2023.
