= London Film Critics' Circle Award for Supporting Actor of the Year =

British film award

London Film Critics Circle Award for Best Supporting Actor
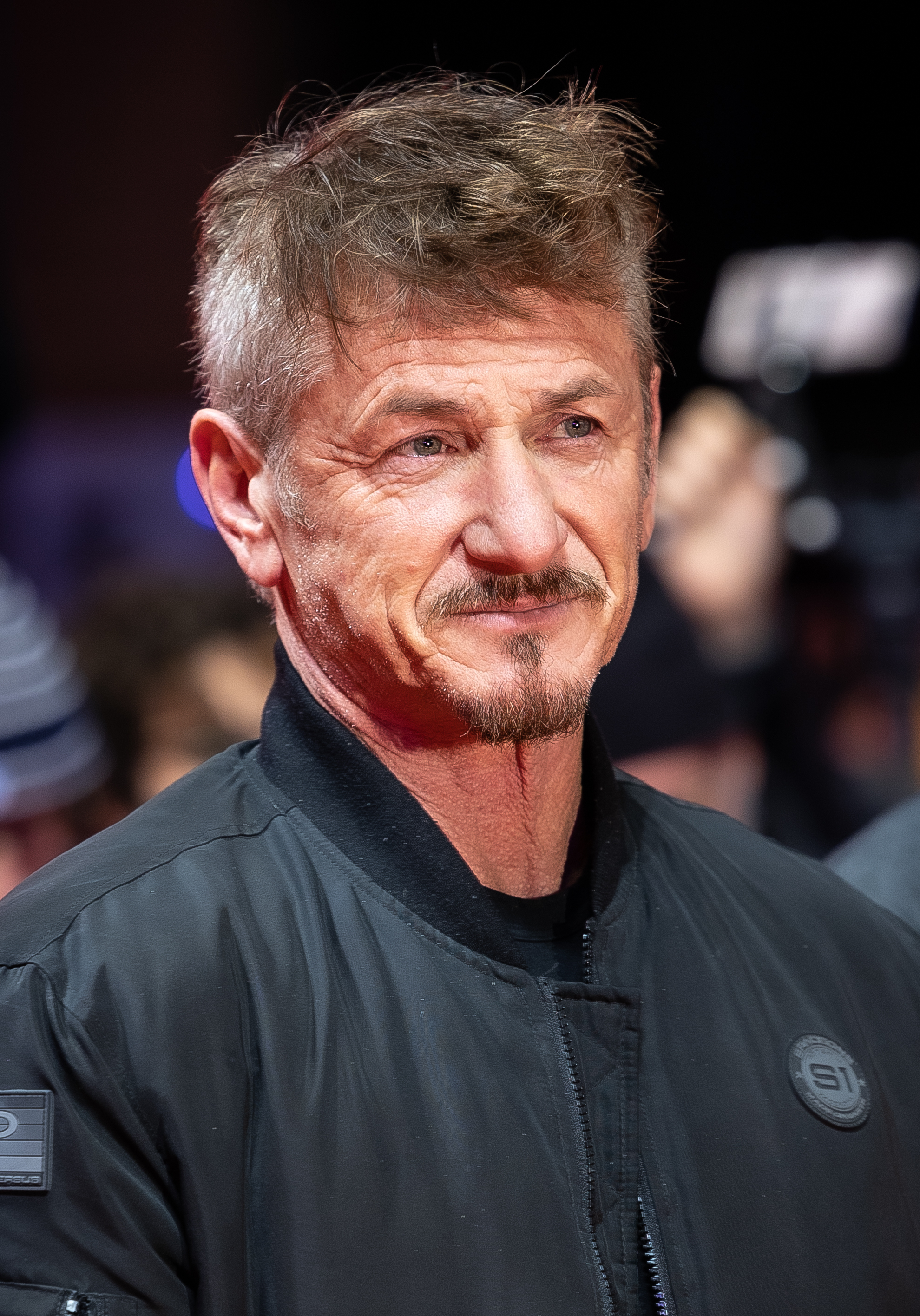
- The 2025 recipient: Sean Penn
- Awarded for: Best Performance by an Actor in a Supporting Role
- Country: England
- Presented by: London Film Critics' Circle
- First award: Kenneth Branagh; My Week with Marilyn (2011)
- Currently held by: Sean Penn; One Battle After Another (2025)
- Website: criticscircle.org.uk

The London Film Critics Circle Award for Supporting Actor of the Year is an annual award given by the London Film Critics' Circle.

== Winners ==
=== 2010s ===
| Year | Winner | Film | Role |
|---|---|---|---|
| 2011 | Kenneth Branagh | My Week with Marilyn | Sir Laurence Olivier |
| 2012 | Philip Seymour Hoffman | The Master | Lancaster Dodd |
| 2013 | Barkhad Abdi | Captain Phillips | Abduwali Muse |
| 2014 | J. K. Simmons | Whiplash | Terence Fletcher |
| 2015 | Mark Rylance | Bridge of Spies | Rudolf Abel |
| 2016 | Mahershala Ali | Moonlight | Juan |
| 2016 | Tom Bennett | Love and Friendship | Sir James Martin |
| 2017 | Hugh Grant | Paddington 2 | Phoenix Buchanan |
| 2018 | Richard E. Grant | Can You Ever Forgive Me? | Jack Hock |
| 2019 | Joe Pesci | The Irishman | Russell Bufalino |

=== 2020s ===
| Year | Winner | Film | Role |
|---|---|---|---|
| 2020 | Shaun Parkes | Small Axe: Mangrove | Frank Crichlow |
| 2021 | Kodi Smit-McPhee | The Power of the Dog | Peter Gordon |
| 2022 | Barry Keoghan | The Banshees of Inisherin | Dominic Kearney |
| 2023 | Charles Melton | May December | Joe Yoo |
| 2024 | Kieran Culkin | A Real Pain | Benji Kaplan |
| 2025 | Sean Penn | One Battle After Another | Col. Steven J. Lockjaw |
