= London Film Critics' Circle =

British film award

The London Film Critics' Circle is the name by which the Film Section of The Critics' Circle is known internationally.

The word London was added because it was thought the term Critics' Circle Film Awards did not convey the full context of the awards' origins; the LFCC wished its annual Awards to be recognised on film advertising, especially in the United States, and in production notes.

The Critics' Circle, founded in 1913, is an association for working British critics. Film critics first became eligible for membership of the Circle in 1926. The Film section now has more than 180 members drawn from publications, broadcast media and the internet throughout the United Kingdom.

Film section members of the Critics' Circle will have worked as critics—writing informed analytical features or broadcasting programmes about film for British publications and media—for at least two years, earning income from reviewing and writing about film.

== Critics' Circle Film Awards ==
The Critics' Circle Film Awards were instituted in 1980 and are awarded annually by the Film Section of the Critics' Circle.

Voted for by all members of the Film Section, the awards have become a major event in London, presented at a dinner dance held in a large West End hotel. From 1995 to 2010 the awards ceremony was a charity event in aid of the National Society for the Prevention of Cruelty to Children (NSPCC).

=== Award categories ===
Over the years, the Award categories have gradually changed with some categories being added and others dropped. For some categories this means that winners were not necessarily declared or listed in each of the Awards year.

In 2007, it was decided that Irish filmmakers, actors and others involved in the film industry would be eligible in what had previously been called "British" award categories. To that end, the titles of several of the awards were amended as "British/Irish".

Special awards include: The Attenborough Award, which goes to the British/Irish film of the year; The Philip French Award, which goes to the breakthrough British/Irish filmmaker of the year, and The Dilys Powell Award, which is awarded for excellence in cinema.

Past and present award categories include:

- Film of the Year (1980–present)
- Foreign Language Film of the Year (1980–present)
- Director of the Year (1980–present)
- Screenwriter of the Year (1980–present)
- Actor of the Year (1990–present)
- Actress of the Year (1991–present)
- Supporting Actor of the Year (2011–present)
- Supporting Actress of the Year (2011–present)
- International Newcomer of the Year
- The Attenborough Award: British/Irish Film of the Year (1991–present)
- Animated Feature of the Year
- Documentary of the Year
- British/Irish Director of the Year
- British/Irish Screenwriter of the Year
- British/Irish Producer of the Year
- Technical Achievement (2011–present)
- British/Irish Performer of the Year
- Young British/Irish Performer of the Year
- Breakthrough British/Irish Filmmaker
- Breakthrough Performer
- Dilys Powell Award for Excellence in Film
- Derek Malcolm Award for Innovation
- British/Irish Short Film of the Year
- British/Irish Actor of the Year (1991–2022)
- British/Irish Actress of the Year (1993–2022)

=== Awards ceremonies ===
- 1990
- 1991
- 1992
- 1993
- 1994
- 1995
- 1996
- 1997
- 1998
- 1999
- 2000
- 2001
- 2002
- 2003
- 2004
- 2005
- 2006
- 2007
- 2008
- 2009
- 2010
- 2011
- 2012
- 2013
- 2014
- 2015
- 2016
- 2017
- 2018
- 2019
- 2020
- 2021
- 2022
- 2023
- 2024
- 2025

=== 1986–1990 winners ===
==== 1986 winners ====
- Actor of the Year (TIE)

William Hurt – Kiss of the Spider Woman
Bob Hoskins – Mona Lisa

- Screenwriter of the Year

Woody Allen – Hannah and Her Sisters

- Director of the Year

Akira Kurosawa – Ran

- Film of the Year

A Room with a View

==== 1987 winners ====
- Actor of the Year (TIE)

Sean Connery – The Untouchables
Gary Oldman – Prick Up Your Ears

- Screenwriter of the Year

Alan Bennett – Prick Up Your Ears

- Director of the Year

Stanley Kubrick – Full Metal Jacket

- Film of the Year

Hope and Glory

==== 1988 winners ====
- Actor of the Year (TIE)

Stephane Audran – Babette's Feast
Leo McKern – Travelling North

- Screenwriter of the Year

David Mamet – House of Games

- Director of the Year

John Huston – The Dead

- Film of the Year

House of Games

==== 1989 winners ====
- Actor of the Year

Daniel Day-Lewis – My Left Foot

- Screenwriter of the Year

Christopher Hampton – Dangerous Liaisons

- Director of the Year

Terence Davies – Distant Voices, Still Lives

- Film of the Year

Distant Voices, Still Lives

==== 1990 winners ====
- Actor of the Year

Philippe Noiret – Cinema Paradiso

- Screenwriter of the Year

Woody Allen – Crimes and Misdemeanors

- Director of the Year

Woody Allen – Crimes and Misdemeanors

- Film of the Year

Crimes and Misdemeanors

=== 1991–1996 winners ===
==== 1991 winners ====
- Actor of the Year

Gérard Depardieu – Cyrano de Bergerac

- Actress of the Year

Susan Sarandon – Thelma & Louise, White Palace

- British Actor of the Year

Alan Rickman – Close My Eyes, Truly, Madly, Deeply, Quigley Down Under, Robin Hood: Prince of Thieves

- British Director of the Year

Alan Parker – The Commitments

- British Screenwriter of the Year

Dick Clement, Ian La Frenais, Roddy Doyle – The Commitments

- British Film of the Year

Life Is Sweet

- Screenwriter of the Year

David Mamet – Homicide

- Director of the Year

Ridley Scott – Thelma & Louise

- Film of the Year

Thelma & Louise

==== 1992 winners ====
- Actor of the Year

Robert Downey Jr. – Chaplin

- Actress of the Year

Judy Davis – Husbands and Wives, Barton Fink, Naked Lunch

- British Actor of the Year

Daniel Day-Lewis – The Last of the Mohicans

- British Director of the Year

Neil Jordan – The Crying Game

- British Film of the Year

Howards End

- British Screenwriter of the Year

Neil Jordan – The Crying Game

- Director of the Year

Robert Altman – The Player

- Film of the Year

Unforgiven

- Newcomer of the Year

Baz Luhrmann – Strictly Ballroom

- Screenwriter of the Year

Michael Tolkin – The Player

==== 1993 winners ====
- Actor of the Year

Anthony Hopkins – The Remains of the Day

- Actress of the Year

Holly Hunter – The Piano

- British Actor of the Year

David Thewlis – Naked

- British Actress of the Year

Miranda Richardson – Fatale

- British Director of the Year

Ken Loach – Raining Stones

- British Film of the Year

The Remains of the Day

- British Screenwriter of the Year

Roddy Doyle – The Snapper

- British Technical Achievement of the Year

Ken Adam – Addams Family Values

- Director of the Year

James Ivory – The Remains of the Day

- Film of the Year

The Piano

- Newcomer of the Year

Quentin Tarantino – Reservoir Dogs

- Screenwriter of the Year

Harold Ramis, Danny Rubin – Groundhog Day

- Special Award

Kate Maberly – The Secret Garden

==== 1994 winners ====
- Actor of the Year

John Travolta – Pulp Fiction

- Actress of the Year

Linda Fiorentino – The Last Seduction

- British Actor of the Year

Ralph Fiennes – Schindler's List

- British Actress of the Year

Crissy Rock – Ladybird, Ladybird

- British Director of the Year

Mike Newell – Four Weddings and a Funeral

- British Film of the Year

Four Weddings and a Funeral

- British Producer of the Year

Duncan Kenworthy – Four Weddings and a Funeral

- British Screenwriter of the Year

Richard Curtis – Four Weddings and a Funeral

- Director of the Year

Steven Spielberg – Schindler's List

- Film of the Year

Schindler's List

- Newcomer of the Year

Jim Carrey – The Mask, Ace Ventura: Pet Detective

- Screenwriter of the Year

Quentin Tarantino – Pulp Fiction

- Special Award

Hugh Grant – Four Weddings and a Funeral

==== 1995 winners ====
- Actor of the Year

Johnny Depp – Ed Wood, Don Juan DeMarco

- Actress of the Year

Nicole Kidman – To Die For

- British Actor of the Year

Nigel Hawthorne – The Madness of King George

- British Actress of the Year

Kate Winslet – Heavenly Creatures

- British Director of the Year

Michael Radford – Il Postino: The Postman

- British Film of the Year

The Madness of King George

- British Newcomer of the Year

Danny Boyle – Shallow Grave

- British Screenwriter of the Year

Alan Bennett – The Madness of King George

- Director of the Year

Peter Jackson – Heavenly Creatures

- Film of the Year

Babe

- Screenwriter of the Year

Paul Attanasio – Quiz Show, Disclosure

==== 1996 winners ====
- Actor of the Year

Morgan Freeman – Seven

- Actress of the Year

Frances McDormand – Fargo

- British Actor of the Year

Ian McKellen – Richard III
Ewan McGregor – Trainspotting, Brassed Off, Emma, The Pillow Book

- British Actress of the Year

Brenda Blethyn – Secrets & Lies

- British Director of the Year

Mike Leigh – Secrets & Lies

- British Newcomer of the Year

Emily Watson – Breaking the Waves

- British Producer of the Year

Andrew Macdonald – Trainspotting

- British Screenwriter of the Year

Emma Thompson – Sense and Sensibility

- Director of the Year

Joel Coen – Fargo

- Film of the Year

Secrets & Lies

- Screenwriter of the Year

Joel Coen and Ethan Coen – Fargo
