= London Film Critics Circle Awards 1990 =

British film awards ceremony

11th London Film Critics Circle Awards

1991

Film of the Year:
Crimes and Misdemeanors

The 11th London Film Critics Circle Awards, honouring the best in film for 1990, were announced by the London Film Critics Circle in 1991.

== Winners ==
Film of the Year

- Crimes and Misdemeanors

Foreign Language Film of the Year

- Cinema Paradiso • Italy

Director of the Year

- Woody Allen – Crimes and Misdemeanors

Screenwriter of the Year

- Woody Allen – Crimes and Misdemeanors

Actor of the Year

- Philippe Noiret – Cinema Paradiso

Special Achievement Award

- Penelope Houston
- Simon Relph
