= London Film Critics Circle Awards 1994 =

British film awards ceremony

15th London Film Critics Circle Awards

1995

Film of the Year:
Schindler's List

British Film of the Year:
Four Weddings and a Funeral

The 15th London Film Critics Circle Awards, honouring the best in film for 1994, were announced by the London Film Critics Circle in 1995.

== Winners ==
Film of the Year

- Schindler's List

British Film of the Year

- Four Weddings and a Funeral

Foreign Language Film of the Year

- Farewell My Concubine • China

Director of the Year

- Steven Spielberg – Schindler's List

British Director of the Year

- Mike Newell – Four Weddings and a Funeral

Screenwriter of the Year

- Quentin Tarantino – Pulp Fiction

British Screenwriter of the Year

- Richard Curtis – Four Weddings and a Funeral

Actor of the Year

- John Travolta – Pulp Fiction

Actress of the Year

- Linda Fiorentino – The Last Seduction

British Actor of the Year

- Ralph Fiennes – Schindler's List

British Actress of the Year

- Crissy Rock – Ladybird, Ladybird

Newcomer of the Year

- Jim Carrey – The Mask and Ace Ventura: Pet Detective

British Newcomer of the Year

- Iain Softley – Backbeat

British Technical Achievement of the Year

- Roger Deakins – The Hudsucker Proxy

British Producer of the Year

- Duncan Kenworthy – Four Weddings and a Funeral

Special Achievement Award

- Hugh Grant – Four Weddings and a Funeral
- Barry Norman

Dilys Powell Award

- Richard Attenborough
