= London Film Critics Circle Awards 1996 =

British film awards ceremony

17th London Film Critics Circle Awards

2 March 1997

Film of the Year:
Fargo

British Film of the Year:
Secrets & Lies

The 17th London Film Critics Circle Awards, honouring the best in film for 1996, were announced by the London Film Critics Circle on 2 March 1997.

== Winners ==
Film of the Year

- Fargo

British Film of the Year

- Secrets & Lies

Foreign Language Film of the Year

- Les Misérables • France

Director of the Year

- Joel Coen – Fargo

British Director of the Year

- Mike Leigh – Secrets & Lies

Screenwriter of the Year

- Joel and Ethan Coen – Fargo

British Screenwriter of the Year

- Emma Thompson – Sense and Sensibility

Actor of the Year

- Morgan Freeman – Seven

Actress of the Year

- Frances McDormand – Fargo

British Actor of the Year

- Ewan McGregor – Trainspotting, Brassed Off, Emma, The Pillow Book
- Ian McKellen – Richard III

British Actress of the Year

- Brenda Blethyn – Secrets & Lies

British Newcomer of the Year

- Emily Watson – Breaking the Waves

British Producer of the Year

- Andrew Macdonald – Trainspotting

Special Achievement Award

- Norman Wisdom

Dilys Powell Award

- John Mills

Lifetime Achievement Award

- Jack Cardiff
