= London Film Critics Circle Awards 1992 =

British film awards ceremony

13th London Film Critics Circle Awards

1993

Film of the Year:
Unforgiven

British Film of the Year:
Howards End

The 13th London Film Critics Circle Awards, honouring the best in film for 1992, were announced by the London Film Critics Circle in 1993.

== Winners ==
Film of the Year

- Unforgiven

British Film of the Year

- Howards End

Foreign Language Film of the Year

- Raise the Red Lantern • China/Hong Kong/Taiwan

Director of the Year

- Robert Altman – The Player

British Director of the Year

- Neil Jordan – The Crying Game

Screenwriter of the Year

- Michael Tolkin – The Player

British Screenwriter of the Year

- Neil Jordan – The Crying Game

Actor of the Year

- Robert Downey Jr. – Chaplin

Actress of the Year

- Judy Davis – Husbands and Wives, Barton Fink and Naked Lunch

British Actor of the Year

- Daniel Day-Lewis – The Last of the Mohicans

Newcomer of the Year

- Baz Luhrmann – Strictly Ballroom

British Newcomer of the Year

- Peter Chelsom – Hear My Song

British Technical Achievement of the Year

- Roger Deakins – Barton Fink

British Producer of the Year

- Stephen Woolley – The Crying Game

Special Achievement Award

- Freddie Francis

Dilys Powell Award

- Freddie Young
