= London Film Critics Circle Awards 1995 =

British film awards ceremony

16th London Film Critics Circle Awards

8 March 1996

Film of the Year:
Babe

British Film of the Year:
The Madness
of King George

The 16th London Film Critics Circle Awards, honouring the best in film for 1995, were announced by the London Film Critics Circle in 1996.

== Winners ==
Film of the Year

- Babe

British Film of the Year

- The Madness of King George

Foreign Language Film of the Year

- Il Postino • Italy

Director of the Year

- Peter Jackson - Heavenly Creatures

British Director of the Year

- Michael Radford - Il Postino

Screenwriter of the Year

- Paul Attanasio - Quiz Show and Disclosure

British Screenwriter of the Year

- Alan Bennett - The Madness of King George

Actor of the Year

- Johnny Depp - Ed Wood and Don Juan DeMarco

Actress of the Year

- Nicole Kidman - To Die For

British Actor of the Year

- Nigel Hawthorne - The Madness of King George

British Actress of the Year

- Kate Winslet - Heavenly Creatures

Newcomer of the Year

- Chris Noonan - Babe

British Newcomer of the Year

- Danny Boyle - Shallow Grave

British Technical Achievement of the Year

- Ken Adam - The Madness of King George

British Producer of the Year

- Simon Fields and Peter Chelsom - Funny Bones

Special Achievement Award

- John Gielgud
- Peter Rogers

Dilys Powell Award

- Wendy Hiller
