= London Film Critics Circle Awards 2003 =

British film awards ceremony

24th London Film Critics Circle Awards

11 February 2004

Film of the Year:
Master and Commander: The Far Side of the World

British Film of the Year:
The Magdalene Sisters

The 24th London Film Critics Circle Awards, honouring the best in film for 2003, were announced by the London Film Critics Circle on 11 February 2004.

== Winners and nominees ==
=== Film of the Year ===
Master and Commander: The Far Side of the World

- Far from Heaven
- The Hours
- The Lord of the Rings: The Return of the King
- Mystic River

=== British Film of the Year ===
The Magdalene Sisters

- The Hours
- In This World
- The Mother
- Young Adam

=== Foreign Language Film of the Year ===
Good Bye Lenin! • Germany

- Spirited Away • Japan
- Swimming Pool • France/UK
- To Be and to Have • France
- The Triplets of Belleville • France

=== Director of the Year ===
Clint Eastwood - Mystic River

- Todd Haynes - Far from Heaven
- Peter Jackson - The Lord of the Rings: The Return of the King
- Andrew Stanton - Finding Nemo
- Peter Weir - Master and Commander: The Far Side of the World

=== British Director of the Year ===
Peter Mullan - The Magdalene Sisters

- Stephen Daldry - The Hours
- David MacKenzie - Young Adam
- Anthony Minghella - Cold Mountain
- Michael Winterbottom - In This World

=== Screenwriter of the Year ===
John Collee and Peter Weir - Master and Commander: The Far Side of the World

- Shari Springer Berman and Robert Pulcini - American Splendor
- Charlie Kaufman - Adaptation.
- Todd Haynes - Far from Heaven
- Brian Helgeland - Mystic River

=== British Screenwriter of the Year ===
David Hare - The Hours

- Richard Curtis - Love Actually
- Peter Mullan - The Magdalene Sisters
- Hanif Kureishi - The Mother
- David MacKenzie - Young Adam

=== Actor of the Year ===
Sean Penn - Mystic River

- Nicolas Cage - Adaptation.
- Russell Crowe - Master and Commander: The Far Side of the World
- Ed Harris - The Hours
- Bill Murray - Lost in Translation

=== Actress of the Year ===
Julianne Moore - Far from Heaven

- Holly Hunter - Thirteen
- Scarlett Johansson - Girl with a Pearl Earring
- Nicole Kidman - Cold Mountain
- Meryl Streep - Adaptation.

=== British Actor of the Year ===
Paul Bettany - Master and Commander: The Far Side of the World

- Paddy Considine - In America
- Daniel Craig - The Mother
- Jude Law - Cold Mountain
- Ewan McGregor - Young Adam

=== British Actress of the Year ===
Anne Reid - The Mother

- Helen Mirren - Calendar Girls
- Charlotte Rampling - Swimming Pool
- Tilda Swinton - Young Adam
- Julie Walters - Calendar Girls

=== British Supporting Actor of the Year ===
Bill Nighy - Love Actually

- John Alderton - Calendar Girls
- Stephen Dillane - The Hours
- Brendan Gleeson - Cold Mountain
- David Threlfall - Master and Commander: The Far Side of the World

=== British Supporting Actress of the Year ===
Emma Thompson - Love Actually

- Shirley Henderson - Intermission
- Emily Mortimer - Young Adam
- Eileen Walsh - The Magdalene Sisters
- Fenella Woolgar - Bright Young Things

=== British Newcomer of the Year ===
David MacKenzie - Young Adam

- Richard Curtis - Love Actually
- Romola Garai - I Capture the Castle
- Nora-Jane Noone - The Magdalene Sisters
- Jamie Sives - Wilbur Wants to Kill Himself

=== Dilys Powell Award ===
- Tom Courtenay
