= Katie Morag (TV series) =

Adaptation of the books by Mairi Hedderwick

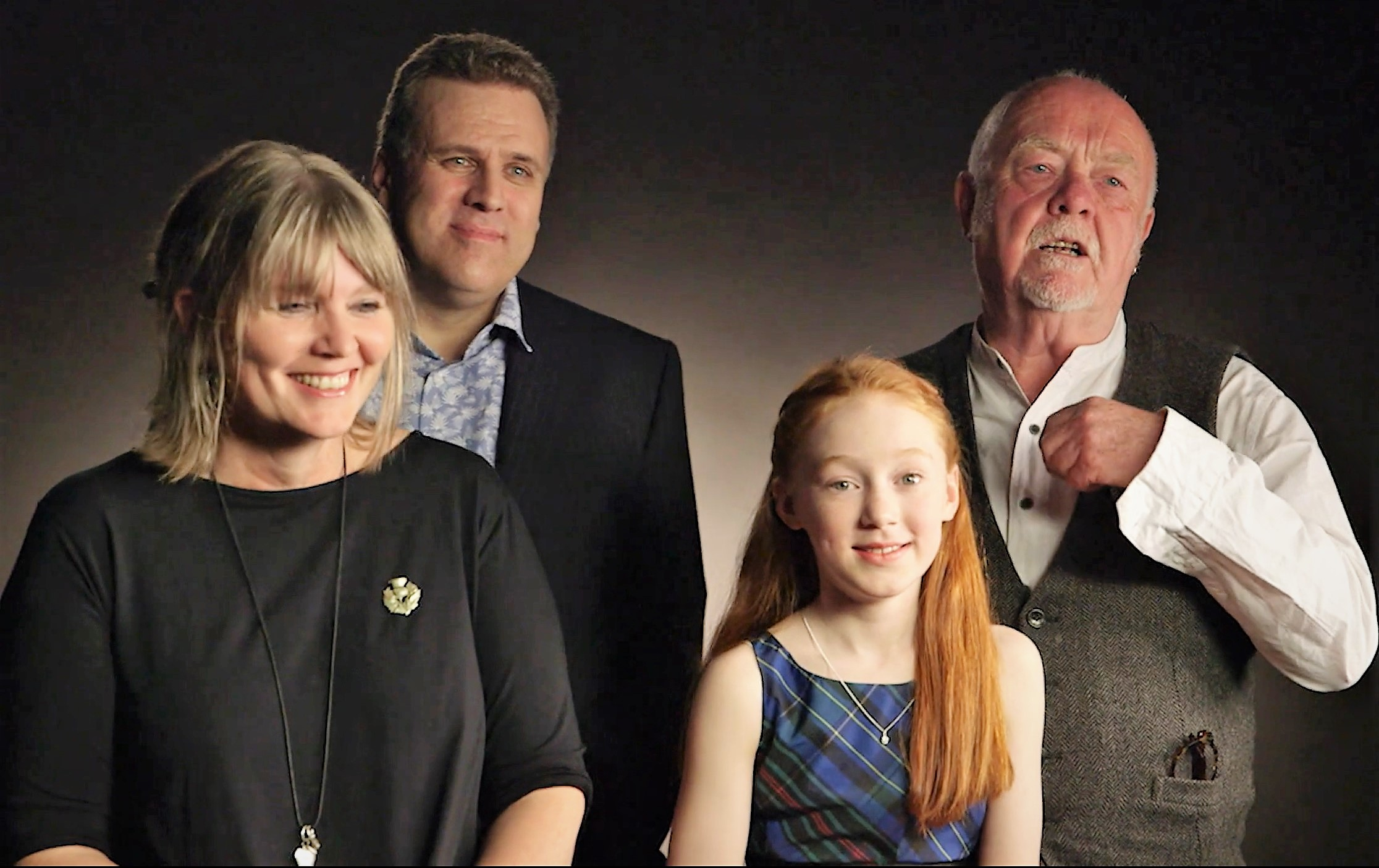
- Crew of Katie Morag receiving Peabody Award in 2016. Left to right: executive producer Lindy Cameron, writer Sergio Casci, actor Cherry Campbell, director Don Coutts
- Also known as: Ceitidh Morag (Scottish Gaelic)
- Genre: Comedy; Children's
- Based on: Katie Morag by Mairi Hedderwick
- Written by: Sergio Casci; Martin McCardie; Stuart Hepburn; Mairi Hedderwick
- Directed by: Don Coutts
- Starring: Cherry Campbell; Gail Watson; Kenneth Harvey; Finlay Macmillan; Peter Macmillan; Annie Louise Ross; Barbara Rafferty
- Composer: Donald Shaw
- Country of origin: United Kingdom (Scotland)
- Original languages: English (CBeebies); Scottish Gaelic (BBC Alba)
- No. of series: 2
- No. of episodes: 39

Production
- Executive producers: Lindy Cameron; Kay Benbow; Robbie Allen
- Producer: Margaret Matheson
- Production location: Isle of Lewis
- Running time: 15 minutes
- Production companies: Move On Up; BBC Scotland

Original release
- Network: CBeebies; CBBC; BBC Alba; BBC One Scotland
- Release: 3 November 2013 – 4 April 2015

Katie Morag (Scottish Gaelic: Ceitidh Morag) is the television adaptation of the series of books by Mairi Hedderwick. The programmes follow the adventures of Katie Morag whose life on the fictional Scottish island of Struay is full of stories of jealousy, bravery and rivalry and peopled by an annoying little brother, busy shopkeeper parents, a perfectly perfect best friend and a couple of grandmothers who between them know everything about everything. The series was produced by Move On Up with support from BBC Scotland and commissioned by the BBC's CBeebies and CBBC channels. It also airs on the BBC's Gaelic channel BBC Alba and BBC One Scotland. Don Coutts directed the series which Margaret Matheson produced and Lindy Cameron executive produced and edited. Katie Morag is also available on BBC iPlayer for over a year.

== Series 1 ==
The series was shot on the Isle of Lewis between May and August 2013 at BBC Alba's studios in Stornoway and on location around the island. It comprised 26x15 minute episodes (6 of which were part of a sub-series called Grannie Island's Ceilidh) and began its run on CBeebies on 3 November 2013.

Some episodes were repeated on BBC One Scotland in a Sunday afternoon slot between April and May 2014.

== Series 2 ==
In June 2014, it was announced that Katie Morag would be returning for a second series. Cheryl Taylor, Controller of CBBC, said: "This is the first time that CBBC and CBeebies have co-commissioned a series and I am really pleased to be working so closely with CBeebies. The exclusive episodes to be shown on CBBC will allow us to develop more multifaceted storylines for the older CBBC audience."

Series two was filmed once more on Lewis, between 21 July and 13 September 2014, and comprised 3x15 minute episodes, 9x20 minute episodes and 1x30 minute episode. The first episode was aired on CBBC on 19 December 2014.

== Production ==
=== Writing ===
The series was scripted by a team comprising Sergio Casci, Stuart Hepburn, Martin McCardie, Jan Storie, and Louise Wylie. They used the method of Team Writing For TV. This ensures that the concepts of theme, tone and narrative coherence are successfully carried across the large number of episodes of a long running TV Series. Crucially, it requires all writers to be present at all storylining sessions, and for detailed beat outlines to be created by the entire storylining team.

=== Casting ===
Casting for the series included a casting call in Stornoway, Lewis in March 2013. The casting team also held extensive auditions in Glasgow and Edinburgh. The part was eventually won by seven-year-old Cherry Campbell from Glasgow (whose grandmother was born, and still lives, on Lewis). Campbell took part in the Stornoway auditions. Director Don Coutts said, "We were looking for someone with energy, humour and courage to play the feisty wee character of Katie Morag and we think that Cherry has all three of these attributes in spades!"

=== Locations ===
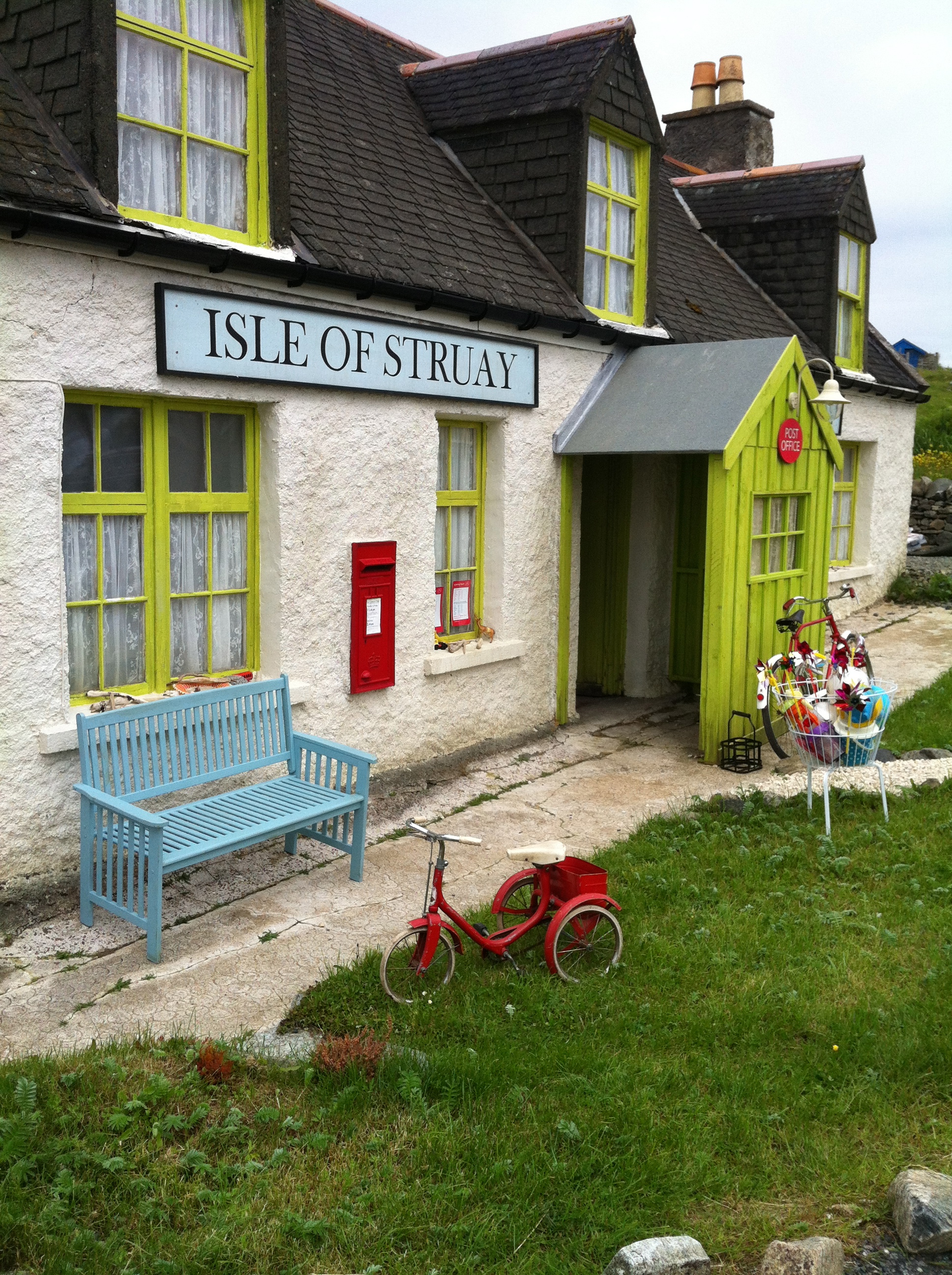
Struay Shop and Post Office from the TV series Katie Morag

The series is filmed on the Isle of Lewis in the Outer Hebrides. Although the fictional Island of Struay is based on Coll in the Inner Hebrides, the producers felt Lewis had the necessary infrastructure to create the series. Executive producer Lindy Cameron further explained, "It was important to us to try and keep as much of this production in the Highlands as we were able. By making good use of all the innate facilities and skills that Lewis has to offer us we hope that the benefit to the Island, and to all of the Hebrides, will be great." The locations include the remote village of Tolsta Chaolais (the McColl Shop and Post Office); Tabost, Lochs (Grannie Island's croft); Laxay Boathouse, Laxay (Uncle Matthew's Hut); Cnoc School, Knock; Dal Mor Beach; Bhaltos Pier (Ferry pier, and lady Artists house); Maivaig Pontoon; Shawbost Beach; Reef Beach; Carloway FC (shinty pitch).

=== Music ===
The soundtrack for the series was created by Scottish musician, composer and producer Donald Shaw.

The soundtrack was released as an mp3 download on 1 January 2016.

=== Gaelic ===
The series has been dubbed into Scottish Gaelic, for broadcast on BBC Alba. Known as Ceitidh Mòrag, the series began on 7 January 2014.

== Cast and characters ==
=== Main cast ===
- Cherry Campbell as Katie Morag McColl
- Kate Macmillan/Kimberley Bremner as Katie Morag double
- Finlay Macmillan/Peter Macmillan as Liam McColl
- Annie Louise Ross as Grannie Island
- Gail Watson as Isobel McColl
- Kenneth Harvey as Peter McColl
- Barbara Rafferty as Grandma Mainland
- Angus Peter Campbell as Neilly Beag
- Anna Hepburn as Mrs. Baxter

=== Recurring characters ===
- Jim Sturgeon as Matthew McColl
- Sean Scanlan as Grandad Island
- Steven McNicoll as Mr Mackie
- Francesca Dymond as Mrs Mackie

=== Guest actors ===
- Greg Hemphill as Donald John Cameron
- Kari Corbett as Candice Kennedy
- Cal Macaninch as Mr Cavendish
- Shauna Macdonald as Mrs Cavendish
- Findlay Napier as Uncle Sven
- Gerald Lepkowski as Geordie
- Hamish Napier as Uncle Sean
- Kaitlyn Anne Woodard as Baby Flora Anne McColl

== Episodes ==
=== Series 1 (2013–2014) ===
No. overall	No. in season	Title	Original release date
1	1	"Katie Morag Delivers the Mail"	November 3, 2013
2	2	"Katie Morag and the Two Grandmothers"	November 3, 2013
3	3	"Katie Morag and the Old Teacher"	November 10, 2013
4	4	"Grannie Island's Ceilidh: The Big Smelly Goat"	November 10, 2013
5	5	"Katie Morag and the New Boy"	November 17, 2013
6	6	"Katie Morag and the Halloween Pirate"	November 17, 2013
7	7	"Katie Morag and Izzy"	November 24, 2013
8	8	"Grannie Island's Ceilidh: Stone Soup"	November 24, 2013
9	9	"Katie Morag and Special Deliver"	December 1, 2013
10	10	"Katie Morag and Tiresome Ted"	December 1, 2013
11	11	"Katie Morag and the Mysteries"	December 8, 2013
12	12	"Grannie Island's Ceilidh: Little Izzy"	December 8, 2013
13	13	"Katie Morag and the Two Peas"	December 15, 2013
14	14	"Katie Morag and the New Year Party"	December 15, 2013
15	15	"Katie Morag and the Baking Day Secret"	February 16, 2014
16	16	"Katie Morag and the Grumpy Grannie"	February 16, 2014
17	17	"Katie Morag and the Big Boy Cousins"	February 23, 2014
18	18	"Grannie Island's Ceilidh: Granpa's Bowl"	February 23, 2014
19	19	"Katie Morag and the Seals Singing"	March 2, 2014
20	20	"Grannie Island's Ceilidh: Annie Jessie and the Merboy"	March 2, 2014
21	21	"Katie Morag and the Hill Race"	March 9, 2014
22	22	"Grannie Island's Ceilidh: Hugh Handy"	March 9, 2014
23	23	"Katie Morag and the Big Picture"	March 16, 2014
24	24	"Katie Morag and the Brochan Bus"	March 16, 2014
25	25	"Katie Morag and the Wedding: Part 1"	March 23, 2014
26	26	"Katie Morag and the Wedding: Part 2"	March 23, 2014

=== Series 2 (2014–2015) ===
No. overall	No. in season	Title	Original release date
27	1	"Katie Morag and the Golden Treasure"	December 19, 2014
28	2	"Katie Morag and the Family Tree"	February 1, 2015
29	3	"Katie Morag and the Dancing Class"	February 1, 2015
30	4	"Katie Morag and the Sick Sheep"	February 8, 2015
31	5	"Katie Morag and the Carrot Competition"	February 8, 2015
32	6	"Katie Morag and the Big Shinty Match"	February 15, 2015
33	7	"Katie Morag and the Day of Birthdays"	February 15, 2015
34	8	"Katie Morag and the Struay Star"	February 22, 2015
35	9	"Katie Morag and the Road to Grannie Island's"	February 22, 2015
36	10	"Katie Morag and Uncle Matthew's Hut"	March 1, 2015
37	11	"Katie Morag and the Grand Concert"	March 1, 2015
38	12	"Katie Morag and the Big Balloon"	March 8, 2015
39	13	"Katie Morag and the Worst Day Ever"	April 4, 2015

== Reception ==
=== Critical reception ===
The first series was met with critical acclaim. Martin Chilton in The Telegraph wrote, "The series is lovely and celebrates the sense of community so intrinsic to the stories."

In The Times, Helen Rumbelow suggested viewers, "Draw the curtains, pour a whisky and enjoy one of the most realistic child performances of the decade, the butchest grandma on screen, and the best Hebridean landscape in the world. It's as close as you can get to not watching TV without having to give up TV."

=== Awards ===
Katie Morag won two British Academy Children's Awards for 2014: Best Drama, and Best Performance, Cherry Campbell (Katie Morag). It was also nominated for Best Writer, Sergio Casci (Lead writer).

The series repeated its 2014 success at the British Academy Children's Awards scooping the award for Best Drama once again in 2015.

Katie Morag won Best Children's Programme at BAFTA Scotland British Academy Scotland Awards in 2014.

The series won Best Children's Programme or Series at the 2014 Freesat Free TV Awards. The judges said, "Beautifully and authentically shot, it was a key move by its host channel into scripted drama, delivering self contained stories that felt sweet and, more importantly, real to their young audience."

It also won the Royal Television Society Scotland Children's Award at the inaugural RTS Scotland awards ceremony in 2014. The judges said, "This programme is innovative and daring in its adaptation of an iconic property. At the heart of it is an exceptional performance from the lead character."

The series won Best New Kids Series at the 2015 Kidscreen Awards in Miami.

In April 2016 Katie Morag was awarded a Peabody Award. The American-based Peabody Awards were established in the 1940s as a radio equivalent to the Pulitzer Prize. Announcing winners on the award website, members said of the Katie Morag TV series: “Mairi Hedderwick's popular books about a feisty, wee, red-headed girl (the splendid Cherry Campbell) and the Scottish island community she's growing up in are exquisitely realised in this series. Timeless, perhaps old fashioned, but never precious or blindly idyllic, Katie Morag deals honestly and gracefully with death, loss, rivalry and other serious themes.”

== DVD releases ==
The DVDs of series one were released over the autumn of 2014.

DVD boxsets of series one and series two were subsequently released in 2015.
