= Jamie Sives =

Scottish actor

- Born: Lochend, Edinburgh, Scotland
- Occupation: Actor
- Years active: 1999–present

Jamie Sives (/ˈsiːvəs/ SEE-vəs) is a Scottish actor. He came to prominence for his role as Wilbur in the 2002 film Wilbur Wants to Kill Himself, and is known for his more recent roles as Cal Innes in Shetland in 2023 and as James Hardy in the 2025 Netflix series Dept. Q.

== Early life and education ==
Sives studied at Leith Academy, along with future Guilt and Dept. Q co-star Mark Bonnar. During their time at school, Bonnar and Sives acted in a play together. Sives is the Cousin of Former Scottish Boxer Alex Arthur.

== Career ==
Sives worked as a scaffolder, as a postman, and as a club doorman in Edinburgh before turning to acting full-time.

In 2014 he played the lead role of King James III of Scotland in the National Theatre of Scotland's production of James III, which was also part of the Edinburgh International Festival.

== Filmography ==
=== Films ===
Year	Film	Role	Notes
1999	Split Second	Tony Jones	TV movie
2001	Mean Machine	Chiv	
2002	Wilbur Wants to Kill Himself	Wilbur	Festroia International Film Festival: Best Actor; Valladolid International Film Festival: Best Actor; Nominated – British Independent Film Award for Most Promising Newcomer; Nominated – European Film Awards: Audience Award for Best Actor; Nominated – London Film Critics Circle Award for British Newcomer of the Year
2004	One Last Chance	Fitz	
2005	On a Clear Day	Rob	
2005	Frozen	Jim	
2006	A Woman in Winter	Michael	
2006	Love and Other Disasters	Finlay McMillian	
2007	Hallam Foe	Alasdair	
2007	Wedding Belles	Gordon	TV movie
2008	Last Chance Harvey	Doctor Butler	
2009	Valhalla Rising	Gorm - Christian Viking	
2009	Triage	David	
2010	One Night in Emergency	Nick	TV movie
2010	It's a Wonderful Afterlife	Detective Hughes	
2010	Clash of the Titans	Captain	
2010	Get Him to the Greek	Aldous's Mate in London	
2010	The Strange Case of Wilhelm Reich	Hamilton	
2013	Rush	BRM Mechanic	
2013	A Very Unsettled Summer	Daniel	
2015	In the Heart of the Sea	Cole	
2016	Moon Dogs	Maurice	
2017	Rearview	Paul	
2017	The Voyage of the Heretique	Jack Palmer	
2018	Wild Rose	Sam	
2019	Intrigo: Dear Agnes	Peter	
2019	Trick or Treat	Lesley	
2022	The Last Manhunt	Ben de Crevecoeur	

=== Television ===
Year	Show	Role	Notes
1999	Holby City	Ellie's Ex	Episode: "Brave Heart"
1999	The Bill	Jerry Baker	Episode: "Makeover"
1999	Psychos	Paul Hammond	1 episode
1999	Roger Roger	Barman	1 episode
2000	Taggart	DC Alvie Buchanan	Episode: "Ghost Rider"
2000	Glasgow Kiss	Paul Gilchrist	4 episodes
2002	Ultimate Force	Simon	Episode: "Just a Target"
2002–03	Rockface	Peter Craig	13 episodes
2005	To the Ends of the Earth	1st Lieutenant Summers	3 episodes
2006	Doctor Who	Captain Reynolds	Episodes: "Tooth and Claw"
2007	Secret Diary of a Call Girl	Jay	1 episode
2008	Trial & Retribution	Kevin Reid	1 episode
2008	The Passion	Apostle John	3 episodes
2008	Waking the Dead	Rob Lomax	Episode: "Duty and Honour"
2008	Silent Witness	Ryan McBride	Episode: "Safe"
2011	Outcasts	Leon	1 episode
2011	Game of Thrones	Jory Cassel	5 episodes
2011	New Tricks	Mark Slater	Episode: "Old Fossils"
2012	Secret State	Lee Foulds	4 episodes
2013	The Guilty	Jeb Colman	3 episodes
2017	In the Dark	DCI Jack Gosforth	4 episodes
2018	Hard Sun	Chris Chapel	1 episode
2017–18	Frontier	McTaggart	11 episodes
2019	The Victim	Lenny Dean	4 episodes
2019	Chernobyl	Sitnikov	2 episodes
2021	Crime	DI Dougie Gillman	6 episodes
2019–23	Guilt	Jake McCall	12 episodes
2021–23	Annika	DS Michael McAndrews	12 episodes
2023	Shetland	Cal Innes	6 episodes
2025	Dept. Q	James Hardy	9 episodes
2025	Summerwater	Ian Henderson	3 episodes
TBA	The Loch Ness Mysteries	DS Rory Ramsay	Drama series

=== Short films ===
Year	Title	Role	Director	Notes
1999	Poof	Ian Wise	Jes Benstock, Graeme Kennedy	
1999	Dead on Time	Zammo	James Larkin	
2000	Fish	Calumn	Robert Cavanah	
2004	The Race	George McInnes	Donald Mackinnon	
2004	The Knickerman	The Knickerman	Sonja Phillips	
2010	Tremblay-en-France	James	Vincent Vizioz	
2012	Volume	Nik	Mahalia Belo	
2014	Song		Jamie Sives	Sives wrote, directed, produced and composed the music
2014	Front	Mental Mickey	Kevin Wright	
2018	Wale	O'Brian	Barnaby Blackburn	

=== Audio ===
Year	Title	Role
2021–present	BBC Radio 4: Disordered	Hector
