= Katie Morag =

Fictional girl from Scotland

Katie Morag in her habitual white jumper, tartan kilt and wellies, as pictured on the cover of the first paperback edition of the original book (1984)

Katie Morag is the title character of a series of children's picture books written and illustrated by Mairi Hedderwick. The gentle stories have been praised for their good humour, strong sense of place, and the feisty and independent (sometimes even "thrawn") character of Katie herself. The books are set on the fictional Isle of Struay, off the west coast of Scotland. Katie Morag lives close to the jetty above the island's only shop, where her mother is the postmistress and her father runs the general store.

== Katie Morag series ==
Much of the topography, and also characters and situations, are inspired by Arinagour on the Scottish island of Coll in the Inner Hebrides, the island where Mairi Hedderwick lived for a number of years, and where her daughter still runs a handmade pottery store. In the books the small island community is connected to the mainland by a ferry which initially only comes once a week, on "Boat Day" (later three times a week, after the building of a new pier in the fifth book).

A key character in the books is Katie Morag's "Grannie Island", who lives further round the bay, and is generally found in her dungarees often driving or fixing her tractor, or surrounded by cats around her Rayburn stove, in contrast to Katie Morag's altogether more douce "Granma Mainland". Grannie Island was widely hailed, as for example "a positive image, a celebration of the strength of women, and a challenge to gender stereotyping" – a happy accident, as Hedderwick had originally planned for the character to be male, until her North American publisher demurred; but not inappropriate, as Hedderwick was as likely as not herself to be found behind the wheel of her old tractor at the time.

In England a short National Curriculum Key Stage 1 Geography unit for six- and seven-year-olds, called "An island home", has been linked to the series and in particular the book Katie Morag and the Two Grandmothers. The book Katie Morag and the New Pier has also been used as a peg to discuss how communities can gain and lose from change. The most recent book in the series, Katie Morag and the Dancing Class, was a nominee for the Kate Greenaway Medal in 2008, which is awarded for an outstanding work of illustration in children's literature.

A number of books in the series have been translated into Danish, Swedish, Norwegian, Finnish, Japanese, and Scottish Gaelic.

== Books in the series ==
- Katie Morag Delivers the Mail. 1984.
- Katie Morag and the Two Grandmothers. 1985.
- Katie Morag and the Tiresome Ted. 1986.
- Katie Morag and the Big Boy Cousins. 1987.
- Katie Morag and the New Pier. 1993.
- Katie Morag and the Wedding. 1995.
- The Big Katie Morag Storybook. 1996.
- Katie Morag and the Grand Concert. 1997.
- The Second Katie Morag Storybook. 1998.
- Katie Morag's Rainy Day Book. 1999.
- Katie Morag and the Riddles. 2001.
- Katie Morag of Course. 2003.
- Katie Morag and the Birthdays. 2005.
- Katie Morag and the Dancing Class. 2007.

=== Omnibus collections ===
- The Katie Morag Collection. 1999. (contains the two Katie Morag storybooks)
- Katie Morag Island Stories. 2003. (collects the first four Katie Morag picturebooks)
- More Katie Morag Island Stories. 2004. (collects the second four Katie Morag picturebooks)

== Adaptations ==
Various proposals were made for a television adaptation of the stories. The books were optioned in 1997 by the Scottish filmmaker Don Coutts. In 2002-3 proposals for a traditional animated series, initially of 26 eleven-minute films, were developed by him in association with Red Kite Animation in Edinburgh, with a pilot script by Peter Hynes. Later, in 2005, Coutts was reported to be developing a live-action series to be filmed on the Isle of Lewis. It was reported that a pilot had been made, with ITV interested in taking a series of 26 episodes, and the animated series still under development for the international market. Perhaps because of the shadow of the children's series Balamory, also set in a small Scottish west-coast island community, none of these proposals reached the screen. Speaking in 2010, Mairi Hedderwick said she would be quite happy if the character only remained in books – she had no interest in "pencil cases", and would only want to see her creation dramatised, if at all, as a real character not a cartoon; but it was in the hands of her publishers.

In November 2012 it was announced that the BBC's CBeebies channel had commissioned a series of 26 14-minute live-action dramas, to be made by Coutts' Cromarty-based production company Move on Up. Casting for the series included a casting call in Stornoway in March 2013, for filming on Lewis in May 2013, some of which took place in the remote village of Tolsta Chaolais.

The TV adaptation began in the autumn of 2013, with the first two stories being broadcast on CBeebies on 3 November 2013. The series also has a Gaelic-language soundtrack recorded for BBC Alba.

A stage adaption was created by Lisa Grindall for Mull Theatre in 2005, based on characters and setting from the books, with a new story and songs. After a successful tour of smaller venues in Argyll and the Highlands followed by a week at the Citizens Theatre in Glasgow in 2005, the production was revived as a Christmas show at the Byre Theatre in St Andrews in 2007, and toured again in 2008.

In the 1990s Mairi Hedderwick turned down a proposal from Argyll and Bute Local Enterprise Company to use the character to promote tourism in the area. However, in 2007 she agreed to let NHS Highland adapt illustrations from three of the books into posters for that year's Breastfeeding Awareness Week, a health-promotion campaign to promote breastfeeding in the region, under the slogan "Breastfeeding... A Part of Family Life in Highland". Katie Morag's mum is occasionally depicted breastfeeding in several of the books, without any comment in the text. According to Hedderwick for her this merely reflects "the cosiness of the home and family, ... drawing her own experience of life with a growing family in a small island community". Nevertheless, one American library felt compelled to apply marker pen to an illustration in one of the earlier books, in which one of Katie Morag's mother's breasts is completely exposed.

A Katie Morag exhibition, featuring original prints and jacket covers, storyboards showing the development of a book, and character profiles created for the proposed animated series, was organised by the Scottish Book Trust at the Scottish Storytelling Centre in Edinburgh in 2005, and re-mounted at the An Lanntair community arts centre in Stornoway in September 2006. Hedderwick regularly visits primary schools, leading storytelling sessions and explaining how her books are created, often accompanied by Katie Morag's teddy bear who travels with her in his own black bag. In 2009 she organised a special Katie Morag competition for schools, to raise money for the new community centre to be called An Cridhe ("The Heart") on Coll, which was won by Lowercroft Primary School in Bury.

Katie Morag was also featured in a half-hour television arts documentary made in 1993 for BBC Scotland's Ex-S strand, in which Hedderwick discussed the background to the stories and her plans for the character.
