= Ibrox Parish Church =

Church in Glasgow, Scotland

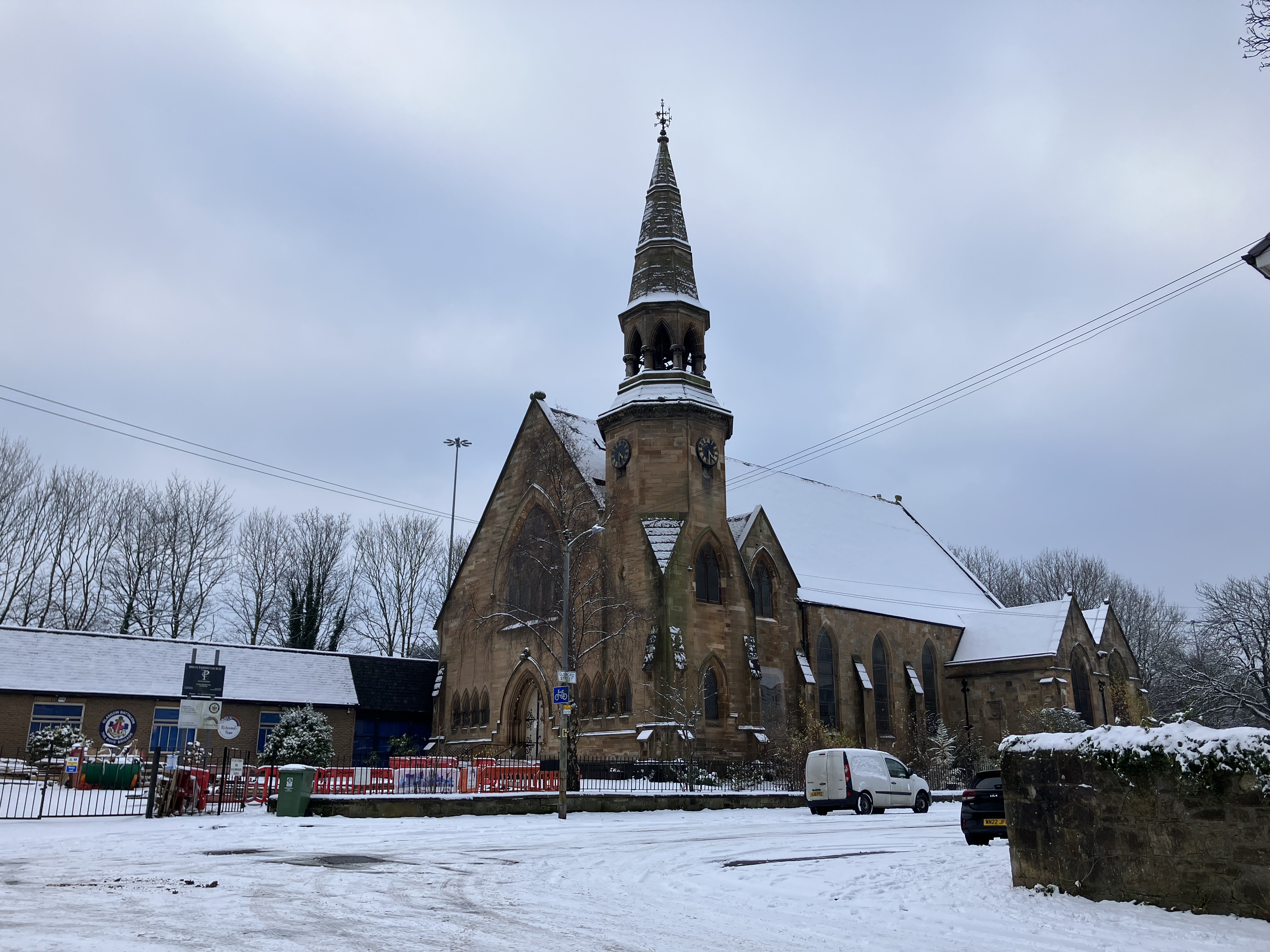
- Ibrox Parish Church
- 55°50′59″N 4°18′07″W
- Location: Glasgow
- Country: Scotland
- Denomination: Church of Scotland
- Website: Church website

History
- Former name: Bellahouston Parish Church
- Status: Active

Architecture
- Functional status: Parish church
- Architect: James Smith
- Architectural type: Church
- Style: Gothic Revival
- Years built: 19th century

Listed Building – Category B
- Designated: 17 February 1992
- Reference no.: LB33575

Ibrox Parish Church is a parish church of the Church of Scotland, serving the Ibrox and, to a lesser extent, the Cessnock areas of Glasgow, Scotland, next to the M8 motorway. The church and parish sits within the Church of Scotland's Presbytery of Glasgow and provides numerous activities in the local and wider community. The current minister is Rev Tara Granados.

== History ==
The history of the church dates back to 1863, when the Kirk Session of Govan Old Parish Church made the church one of her many daughters to help serve the expanding southside of Glasgow as "Bellahouston Parish Church". The sanctuary was built using money from Moses Steven, a wealthy entrepreneur, and designed by James Smith. In 1898 the two transepts were added to the original building, making it the cruciform shape after two unions with neighbouring churches, Steven Memorial in 1969 and Ibrox in 1978. In 1978 the church name was officially changed to Ibrox Parish Church. The building is Category B listed. Over the years, there have been many alterations and upgradings to the overall building complex, including a Link Block with an office and board room between the sanctuary and the church halls.

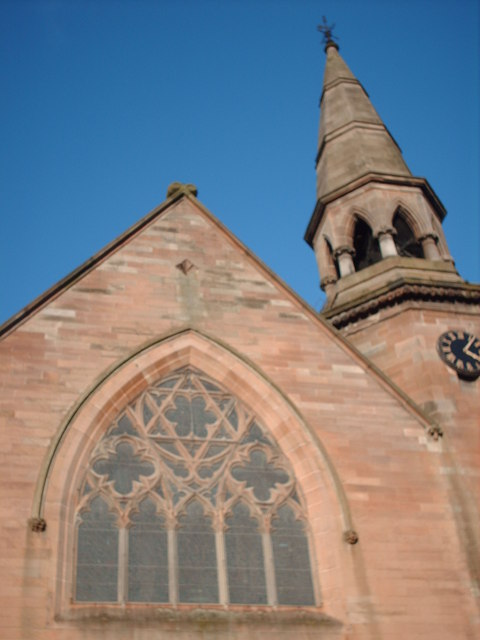
Detail of the church's spire and window

In addition to other artistic features and church furnishings, the building had until 2009 an original French Cavaille-Coll, one of two in Scotland: the other at Paisley Abbey.

In 2002, the church was used as one of the locations for the film Man Dancin'. The church is also a distribution centre for the Glasgow South West Foodbank.

== The Boys' Brigade ==
The church is also the home of the Boys' Brigade Glasgow Battalion's Headquarters and the 163rd Glasgow Company, a stone's throw away from Ibrox Stadium which hosted the 1983 Centenary Service.

== Richmond Hope ==
Since September 2016, Richmond's Hope has been using the church to provide bereavement services for children to explore their feelings and find ways of coping.

== See also ==
- List of Church of Scotland parishes
