= Frozen (2005 film) =

- Film poster
- Directed by: Juliet McKoen
- Written by: Juliet McKoen; Jayne Steel
- Produced by: Mark Lavender; Jim Hickey (co-producer); Rebecca Knapp (line producer)
- Starring: Shirley Henderson; Roshan Seth; Ger Ryan; Richard Armitage; Sean Harris
- Narrated by: Roshan Seth
- Production company: Liminal Films
- Distributed by: Guerilla Films (UK)
- Release dates: 12 March 2005 (International Women's Film Festival of Creteil); 27 January 2006 (United Kingdom)
- Running time: 90 minutes
- Country: United Kingdom
- Language: English

Frozen is a 2005 British psychological thriller film directed by Juliet McKoen. It features Shirley Henderson, Roshan Seth and Ger Ryan. Set in Fleetwood, on the Fylde coast, in North West England, it was filmed in and around the town and also on location in Scotland and Sweden. It is a tale that has the viewer undecided whether it is a ghost story or a murder mystery right until the final climactic moments.

== Plot ==
The film is set two years after the disappearance of Kath Swarbrick's older sister, Annie. Kath is haunted by Annie's disappearance and continues to investigate herself. On the discovery of some strange CCTV footage she appears to lose her grip on reality. Friends and colleagues are concerned for her sanity and beg her to stop.

She is spurred on when she discovers that she has recurring visions of Annie in an otherworldly landscape, which is actually the estuary of the River Wyre in Morecambe Bay, after visiting the last known location of her sister. She begins to wonder if this is a clue, a warning, or a glimpse into the afterlife.

== Cast ==
- Shirley Henderson as Kath Swarbrick
- Roshan Seth as Noyen Roy
- Ger Ryan as Elsie
- Richard Armitage as Steven
- Sean Harris as Hurricane Frank
- Ralf Little as Eddie
- Lyndsey Marshal as Tracey
- Jamie Sives as Jim
- Shireen Shah as Vellma
- Rebecca Palmer as Irene
- Heather Waters as Annie
- Karl Johnson as Coastguard Bill
- George Costigan as PC Pike
- Erin Byrne as baby Josh

== Awards and nominations ==
Frozen won the Best Feature Film at the Dubrovnik Film Festival, the BBC Audience Award at the 2005 Commonwealth Film Festival, and was nominated to the BAFTA Scotland Award for the Audience Award. Shirley Henderson's performance earned her the BAFTA Scotland Award for Best Actress in a Scottish Film, as well as Best Actress category in the 2005 Marrakech International Film Festival and the 2006 Cherbourg-Octeville Festival of Irish & British Film, and also a Special Mention at the Créteil International Women's Film Festival.
