= Dirt Game =

- Genre: Drama
- Created by: Michael Harvey
- Written by: Michael Harvey
- Directed by: Brendan Maher; Grant Brown
- Country of origin: Australia
- Original language: English
- No. of series: 1
- No. of episodes: 6

Production
- Executive producers: Miranda Dear; Amanda Higgs
- Producers: David Taft; Michael Harvey
- Running time: 60 minutes
- Production company: A Harvey Taft Production

Original release
- Network: ABC
- Release: 19 April – 24 May 2009

Dirt Game is an Australian drama television series that screened on the ABC. It starred Joel Edgerton and Freya Stafford. The series contains six 50-minute episodes. It was written by Michael Harvey and produced by David Taft and Michael Harvey. It was directed by Brendan Maher and Grant Brown. It premiered on 19 April 2009 and finished on 25 May 2009.

== Cast ==
=== Main ===
- Joel Edgerton as Shane Bevic
- Freya Stafford as Megan Kerr
- Gerald Lepkowski as Brian Jardine
- Shane Connor as Max Mees
- Katie Wall as Caz Cohen
- Nicholas Bell as Nigel Hay
- Martin Jacobs as Iain Blair
- Lucy Bell as Tess Jardine
- Adrian Mulraney as Simon Cato
- George Whaley as Tim Royce
- Don Hany as Dion Pesci

=== Recurring/guests ===
- Brett Swain as Trev
- Eddie Baroo as Mick
- Elle Mandalis as Annie
- Georgina Naidu as Doctor
- Ian Bliss as Bart
- Jacinta Stapleton as Chloe
- Kerry Walker as Erica
- Mark Coles Smith as Willie
- Nell Feeney as Laurie
- Ningali Lawford as Ruth
- Paul Denny as Miner
- Tony Barry as Alec Nolan
- Tony Rickards as Leo Ives
- Zoe Bertram as Morag

== Episodes ==
No.	Title	Directed by	Written by	Original release date	Aus. viewers (millions)
1	"A Land Down Under"	Brendan Maher	Michael Harvey	19 April 2009	0.769
2	"Green and Gold"	Grant Brown	Michael Harvey	26 April 2009	0.606
3	"Silent Night"	Brendan Maher	Michael Harvey	3 May 2009	0.526
4	"Boab Dreaming"	Grant Brown	Michael Harvey	10 May 2009	0.566
5	"Down Among the Dead Men"	Brendan Maher	Michael Harvey	17 May 2009	0.517
6	"Reckoning"	Grant Brown	Michael Harvey	24 May 2009	0.574

== See also ==
- List of Australian television series
- List of programs broadcast by ABC (Australian TV network)
