= Don Coutts =

Scottish filmmaker

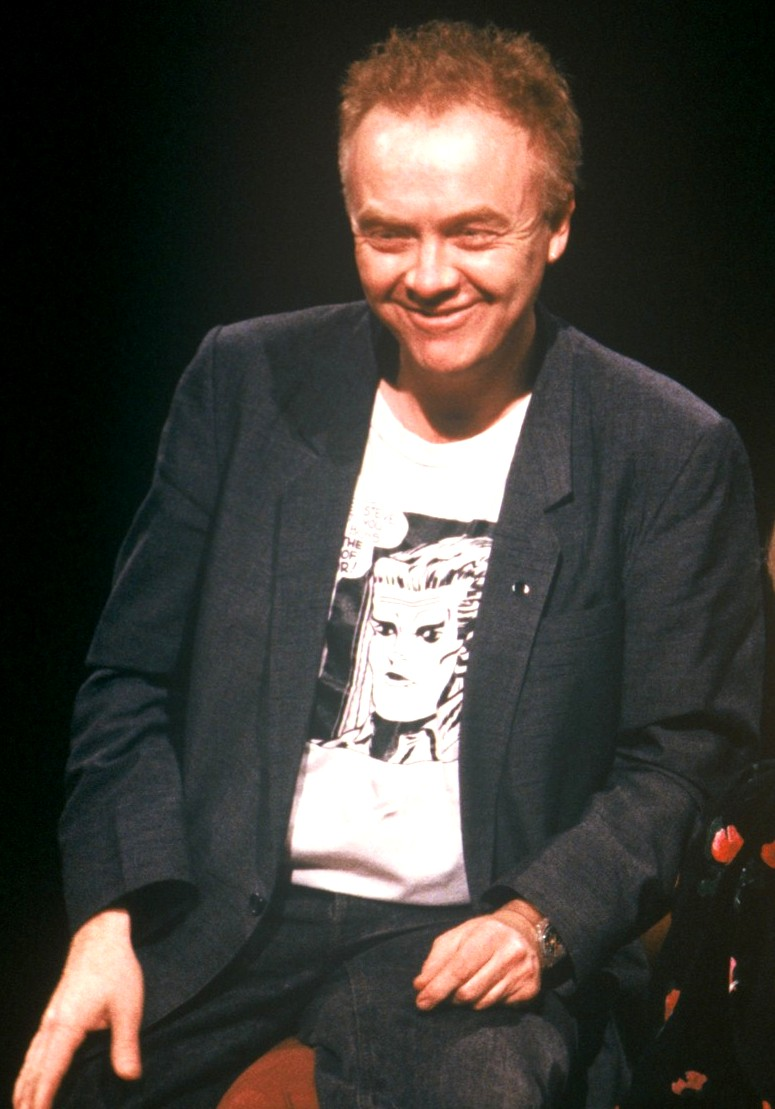
Working on After Dark in 1988

Don Coutts is a Scottish filmmaker best known as the director of the 2003 feature film American Cousins and for bringing the world of Katie Morag to the screen. The successful translation of the characters from the books of Mairi Hedderwick has won nine awards - including a US Peabody, 3 BAFTAs, a Royal Television Society Scotland Children's Award, a Scottish BAFTA and a Kidscreen award.

He is also a documentary and music filmmaker who has worked on numerous current affairs and entertainment productions, including the late night discussion programme After Dark. He was recognised for his achievements and contributions at the 2015 Scottish BAFTA Awards where he won the Best Director Award.

== Biography ==
Don Coutts left school in 1967, and began work with the Simon Community before moving to London. Soon afterwards he was employed by Columbia Pictures as a clerk. Following work in Columbia's laboratories, he got a job in the studio's cutting rooms and worked on several films as an assistant film editor. Subsequently, Coutts was employed by Anglia TV and BBC East as an assistant film editor. At this time Coutts insisted he was the black sheep of the banking family.

== Film and television drama ==
- Katie Morag (2013)
- Dear Green Place (2007)
- American Cousins (2003)
- Rose (1998)
- Dead Sea Reels (1996)
- St Antony’s Day Off (1995)

== Selected documentaries ==
- Mac Musical: 3 × 1 hour following the creation of a new Scottish musical for the opening of Eden Court Theatre. Endemol for BBC Scotland
- True North: Celebrating the 60th birthday of Aly Bain BBC Scotland
- This is Mackay Country: Profile of Craig Mackay. Ex-S BBC Scotland
- When Summers Were Longer: Huts at Carbeth Ex-S BBC Scotland
- Welcome to The GoGo: Arena film on the go-go music scene in Washington for Island Records / BBC Network.
- Cowboys in Skirts: The making of feature film Rob Roy. United Artists/ ITV Network.
- Clarissa & the Countryman: Series two (x3) and three (x4) Clarissa Dickson Wright and Johnny Scott travelling around Britain. BBC Network.
- Fly Me To Dunoon: The story of jazz singer Suzanne Bonner. BBC Network.
- Tacsi: 18 x 30-minute Music Arts programmes - STV/Grampian
- A Kiss To Build A Dream On: Profile of Hollywood director Michael Caton-Jones. BBC Scotland.
- My Name is Albert Watson: Profile of stills photographer Albert Watson. BBC Scotland.
- The Trainer Wars: A film about Nike, Reebok & Adidas. BBC Scotland.
- Tracks of my Tears: Documentary about men and crying. BBC Scotland.
- Victims of The Village: Expose of rural Child Abuse. BBC Scotland.
- The Power List: 50 Minute documentary presented by Jon Snow looking at changes in Power in Britain.

== Awards ==
- Best Director – Milan International Film Festival
- Best Director, Comedy – Newport Beach Film Festival (USA)
- Best Film – Milan International Film Festival
- Best Film – Sunday Times Bowmore Awards
- Best Film – Newport Beach Film Festival (USA)
- Best Comedy – Newport Beach Film Festival (USA)
- Audience Award – Milan International Film Festival
- Audience Award – BAFTA Scotland
- Special Jury Prize – Savannah Film Festival (USA)
