= Sisters of War =

- Written by: John Misto
- Directed by: Brendan Maher
- Starring: Claire van der Boom; Sarah Snook; Susie Porter; Gerald Lepkowski; Paulini Curuenavuli; Khan Chittenden; Anna Volska
- Country of origin: Australia
- Original language: English

Production
- Producer: Andrew Wiseman
- Running time: 95 minutes

Original release
- Network: ABC1
- Release: 14 November 2010

Sisters of War is a television film based on the true story of two Australian women, Lorna Whyte, an army nurse, and Sister Berenice Twohill, a Catholic nun from New South Wales, who survived as prisoners of war in Papua New Guinea during World War II. Sisters of War was written by John Misto, produced by Andrew Wiseman and directed by Brendan Maher. It made its debut at the Brisbane International Film Festival on 11 November 2010. It premiered on television on 14 November 2010 on Australian channel ABC1.

== Background ==
Sisters of War was inspired by real events and based on Rod Miller's manuscript The Lost Women of Rabaul. At the heart of those events were the stories and experiences of Lorna Johnston and Sister Berenice Twohill. In the process of clearing possessions for an estate in 1991, Miller, who is a general auctioneer, came across an old diary. He was about to throw it out when he became intrigued by the contents of the modest book. On closer inspection he saw that it was written in cryptic prose and rhyme. The diary was written by Grace Kruger, one of four civilian nurses captured by the Japanese in Rabaul in 1942. Kruger had deliberately written the diary with cryptic prose so as to confuse any Japanese soldier or casual reader who might have discovered it. Miller became fascinated by this work and the history that motivated it. Discovering there was little information readily available about the Rabaul nurses, he started to research the events surrounding their internment in Rabaul. Miller first met Sister Berenice Twohill and Lorna Johnston in 1997 and through them was able to meet and interview most of the surviving nurses and officers of Lark Force. He was able to borrow and transcribe their diaries which added to the overall knowledge of what had occurred at the time. Miller and writer John Misto joined forces on the project and soon after ABC1 came on board and producer Andrew Wiseman joined the team. Wiseman has an interest in presenting history dramas for television and Sisters of War provided a natural progression from Curtin, the World War II telemovie he produced with Richard Keddie.

The shooting of the film began in April 2010 and ended in June 2010. It was shot in Gold Coast, Queensland.

== Plot ==
Vunapope, a small Catholic mission station on New Britain, is captured by Japanese forces in January 1942.

== Cast ==
- Claire van der Boom as Sister Berenice Twohill. Born in Murwillumbah, most of her early life was spent at Tumbulgum on the Tweed River. She was the eighth of 11 children with eight brothers and two sisters. Sister Berenice joined the missionary order of Our Lady of the Sacred Heart in 1934.
- Sarah Snook as Lorna Whyte. Born in Hay, Whyte was the youngest of eight children. She attended the Hay War Memorial School before training as a nurse at the Corowa Hospital. Joining the army in 1941, she was selected as one of the Australian Army Nursing Service nurses to be part of Lark Force, arriving in Rabaul on 25 April 1941.
- Susie Porter as Kay Parker. Parker was the much-admired matron of the military nurses who were evacuated to the mission at Vunapope when the Japanese invaded Rabaul on 23 January 1942. She showed extraordinary leadership, often standing up to the Japanese to protect the Rabaul women under her care.
- Gerald Lepkowski as Bishop Leo Scharmach. German-born, Bishop Leo Scharmach was the charismatic leader of the Catholic Mission at Vunapope, the headquarters of the Sacred Heart Mission which covered New Britain, New Ireland and Manus. In 57 main stations, 60 priests looked after the needs of 60,000 Catholics. Vunapope was the centre of this extensive mission and the Bishop took up residence there in 1939.
- Paulini Curuenavuli as Sister Marie
- Khan Chittenden as Len
- Anna Volska as Sister Cordula
- Paul Bishop

Source Australian Broadcasting Corporation

== DVD release ==
Sisters of War is available on DVD in Australia.
