= Will (novel) =

2007 book by Christopher Rush

- First edition
- Author: Christopher Rush
- Language: English
- Publisher: Beautiful Books
- Publication date: 2007
- Publication place: United Kingdom
- Media type: Print
- Pages: 448
- ISBN: 978-1-905636-14-3
- OCLC: 153560293

Will is a historical fiction novel by Christopher Rush, published in 2007. It is told from the perspective of William Shakespeare as he writes his will. The book's film right were sold to Ben Kingsley's SBK pictures in 2007.
