= Zoe Bertram =

Australian actress

- Occupation: Actress
- Years active: 1977–current
- Known for: The Restless Years; Prisoner

Zoe Bertram is an Australian actress, who is known for her role as Olivia Baxter in The Restless Years from 1977 to 1981.

== Career ==
Bertram started her acting career in 1977, on the teen-oriented television soap opera The Restless Years, playing the role of Olivia Baxter – eventual wife of Dr Bruce Russell – until 1981. In 1983, she joined Prisoner, playing scheming prostitute Randi Goodlove for 14 episodes, until her character met a grisly demise.

In 1991, Bertram starred in children's series Animal Park playing Sarah Halliday. She played Paula Taylor in Paradise Beach from 1993 to 1994. She also appeared as Laurel Trent in 1994 film The Roly Poly Man with Paul Chubb. From 1995 to 1996, she featured in a number of The Feds telemovies, alongside Robert Taylor.

Bertram played Dorothy Ryan, opposite Richard Roxburgh in The Last of the Ryans – a 1997 tv biopic about Ronald Ryan, the last man to be executed in Australia. That same year, she appeared as Juliet in the drama film Under the Lighthouse Dancing, alongside Jacqueline McKenzie, Jack Thompson and Naomi Watts. From 1997 to 1998, she starred in children's adventure series Mirror, Mirror as Violette de Lutrelle.

From 2009 to 2010, she appeared in a series of television advertisements for Australian Pensioners Insurance.

In July 2011, Bertram joined the cast of Neighbours in a recurring guest role as Polish cleaner Lorraine Dowski. She re-joined the cast in 2017, in the recurring role of Fay Brennan, making her first onscreen appearance on 28 July. She departed the series in 2021, with Faye (who had been living with Huntington's disease), dying after developing pneumonia.

Bertram also appeared in 2017 miniseries Seven Types of Ambiguity, playing the part of May Heywood opposite Hugo Weaving.

Her television guest credits include Chopper Squad, Patrol Boat, Cop Shop, A Country Practice, miniseries Come in Spinner, Blue Heelers, The Flying Doctors, G.P., Home and Away, Good Guys, Bad Guys, Stingers, Rush, City Homicide, Winners & Losers and the TV series reimagining of Picnic at Hanging Rock.

== Acting credits ==
=== Film ===
| Year | Title | Role | Type |
|---|---|---|---|
| 1982 | Verdict - The Schippan Mystery | | TV film |
| 1994 | The Roly Poly Man | Laurel Trent | Feature film |
| 1997 | The Last of the Ryans | Dorothy Ryan | TV film |
| 1997 | Under the Lighthouse Dancing | Juliet | Feature film |
| 1999 | Kick | Sonia Quaid | Feature film |
| 2008 | Monash: The Forgotten Anzac | Lizette Bentwitch | TV film |
| 2009 | Turning Back the Clocks | | Film short |
| 2011 | The Winking Boy | Supervisor June Peters | Film short |

=== Television ===
| Year | Title | Role | Type |
|---|---|---|---|
| 1977 | The Young Doctors | Jennifer Granger | TV series, 5 episodes |
| 1977–1981 | The Restless Years | Olivia Baxter / Olivia Russell | TV series, 122 episodes |
| 1978 | Chopper Squad | Peg | TV series, 1 episode |
| 1979 | Patrol Boat | | TV series, 1 episode |
| 1983 | Prisoner | Randi Goodlove | TV series, 14 episodes |
| 1984 | Cop Shop | | TV series, 1 episode |
| 1984; 1989 | A Country Practice | Jenny Cooper / Sue Pitt | TV series, 3 episodes |
| 1987 | Butterfly Island | | TV series, 1 episode |
| 1987; 1992 | The Flying Doctors | Sky / Sally | TV series, 2 episodes |
| 1989 | Home and Away | Rosemary White | TV series, 1 episode |
| 1989; 1994 | G.P. | Maureen Clark | TV series, 2 episodes |
| 1989 | Bodysurfer | Victoria | TV miniseries, 2 episodes |
| 1990 | Come In Spinner | Nolly | TV miniseries, 2 episodes |
| 1991 | Animal Park | Sarah Halliday | TV series, 13 episodes |
| 1993–1995 | The Feds | Sarah Griffin | TV film series, 8 episodes: 'Abduction' / 'Deadfall ' / 'Deception' / 'Obsession' / 'Seduction' / 'Terror' / 'Vengeance' / 'Suspect' |
| 1993–1994 | Paradise Beach | Paula Taylor | TV series, 254 episodes |
| 1995 | Mirror, Mirror | Violette de Lutrelle | TV series, 13 episodes |
| 1996 | Shark Bay | Kylie Delaney | TV series |
| 1997 | The Adventures of Lano & Woodley | Woman at Counter | TV series, 1 episode |
| 1997–1998 | Mirror, Mirror 2 | Violette de Lutrelle | TV series, 13 episodes |
| 1998 | Good Guys Bad Guys | Det Sgt Maxine Hendrix | TV series, 1 episode |
| 1998 | State Coroner | Michelle Powell | TV series, 1 episode |
| 1999; 2000 | Stingers | Debbie Wilmot | TV series, 2 episodes |
| 2000 | Blue Heelers | Brenda Lawson | TV series, 1 episode |
| 2000 | Sit Down, Shut Up | Mrs. Dawson | TV series, 1 episode |
| 2001 | The Wonderful World of Disney | Mrs. Pelucci | TV series (US), 1 episode |
| 2008 | City Homicide | Dierdre Kincaid | TV series, 1 episode |
| 2008 | Rush | Rita Thomas | TV series, 1 episode |
| 2009 | Dirt Game | Morag | TV miniseries, 1 episode |
| 2011 | Neighbours | Lorraine Dowski | TV series |
| 2014 | Winners & Losers | Jacqui Grbowski | TV series, 2 episodes |
| 2017 | Seven Types of Ambiguity | May Heywood | TV miniseries, 3 episodes |
| 2017–2021 | Neighbours | Faye Brennan | TV series |
| 2018 | Picnic at Hanging Rock | Miranda's Mother | TV miniseries, 1 episode |

=== Stage ===
| Year | Title | Role | Notes |
|---|---|---|---|
| | Children's Pantomimes | | Independent Theatre, Sydney |
| 1976 | Saturday Sunday Monday | Guilianella | Independent Theatre, Sydney |
| | The Importance of Being Earnest | | Axis Theatre Company (6 month schools tour) |
| | The Glass Menagerie | | Axis Theatre Company (6 month schools tour) |
| | A Jubilee Number | | Whitehorse Hotel |
| 1979 | Tribute | Sally Haines | Her Majesty's Theatre, Brisbane with Peter Williams Productions |
| 1979–1980 | The Vampire Show | Angie | Bronte Inn, Sydney, Kirribilli Pub Theatre, Sydney |
| 1981 | The Private Eye Show | Corinne / Milo | Kirribilli Pub Theatre, Sydney |
| 1981 | The Corn is Green | Bessie Watty | Bondi Pavilion, Sydney with Players Theatre Company |
| 1981; 1982 | Little Red Riding Hood | | Axis Theatre Company & Lamington Productions with Her Majesty's Theatre, Sydney |
| 1982 | Buccaneer Show | | Kirribilli Pub Theatre, Sydney |
| 1982 | The Anniversary | | Phillip Street Theatre, Sydney with Peter Williams Productions |
| 1982 | Saturday Sunday Monday | Guilianella | SGIO Theatre, Brisbane with QTC |
| 1982 | The Tempest | Miranda | Albert Park Amphitheatre, Brisbane with QTC |
| 1983 | Applause | Eve Harrington | SGIO Theatre, Brisbane with QTC |
| 1984 | Torch Song Trilogy | Laurel / Lady Blues | Seymour Centre, Sydney, Universal Theatre, Melbourne, National Theatre, Melbourne, Her Majesty's Theatre, Sydney with J. C. Williamson's |
| 1985 | What If You Died Tomorrow? | Kirsty | Marian Street Theatre, Sydney |
| 1985 | Arms and the Man | Louka | Seymour Centre, Sydney with Nimrod Theatre Company |
| 1986; 1987 | Snoopy! The Musical | Lucy | Cremorne Theatre, Brisbane, Gold Coast Arts Centre with QTC |
| 1987 | Arms and the Man | Raina | Suncorp Theatre, Brisbane with QTC |
| 1987–1988 | Les Misérables | Factory Girl | Theatre Royal Sydney with Cameron Mackintosh |
| 1988 | A Stephen Sondheim Evening | | Theatre Royal Sydney with Cameron Mackintosh & The MLC Theatre Royal Company |
| 1989 | Les Misérables | Eponine | The Domain, Sydney with Cameron Mackintosh |
| 1990 | Anything Goes | Hope Harcourt | Hayden Attractions |
| 1991 | Arsenic and Old Lace | | Sydney Opera House, Laycock Street Theatre, Gosford with Peter & Ellen Williams Productions |
| 1991 | Great Expectations: The Musical | Estella | Seymour Centre, Sydney with John Meillon Enterprises |
| 1991 | Love Letters | Melissa Gardner | Seymour Productions |
| 1992 | Wet & Dry | | Stables Theatre, Sydney with Griffin Theatre Company |
| 1993 | A Spring Song | | Newtown Theatre, Sydney |
| 1995 | Rookery Nook / When We Are Married | | Mietta's, Melbourne & Period Pieces Company for MICF |
| 1998 | Les Misérables | Eponine / Factory Girl | Cameron Mackintosh |
