= Tom Georgeson =

English actor (1936–2026)

- Born: 8 August 1936; Liverpool, England
- Died: 18 March 2026 (aged 89); London, England
- Occupation: Actor
- Years active: 1963–2015

Thomas Georgeson (8 August 1936 – 18 March 2026) was an English actor, known for his television and film work. His most notable credits were supporting parts in Between the Lines (1992–94) and in three dramas by Alan Bleasdale: Boys from the Blackstuff (1982), Scully (1984), and G.B.H. (1991). He appeared as the lawyer's clerk Clamb in the BBC One serial Bleak House (2005).

== Early life ==
The fourth of eleven children, Georgeson planned to follow two of his brothers into training for the priesthood. As a result, he moved from a Liverpool secondary school to a Catholic boarding school in Wales. From there, he went to a seminary in Spain, aged 17 but after 18 months, gave up all ideas of becoming a priest. Instead, he studied philosophy for a while, returned to Liverpool and began doing amateur dramatics.

== Career ==
Following national service as a radio direction finder in the RAF, Georgeson's career started as an assistant working in the Liverpool tailor's shop Jackson. In 1960, he accompanied a sister to Australia, since she wanted to join another brother who was living there. Once down under, Georgeson followed his father's wishes and became a primary school teacher but combined it with performing with the Therry Society, an Adelaide amateur dramatics company. In 1962, he married Primrose Newby, an actress and ballet dancer before returning to Britain with her three years later. His theatrical experience in Australia won him theatre performances with the Royal Shakespeare Company followed by repertory in Bristol, Nottingham, York and Liverpool. By now, Georgeson was also beginning a career on television.

Television work included roles in police and hospital dramas such as Holby City, Juliet Bravo, The Manageress, Peak Practice, Agatha Christie's Poirot, A Touch of Frost, Cadfael, The Bill, Dalziel and Pascoe, The Professionals and Z-Cars. He also appeared twice in Doctor Who (in the stories Genesis of the Daleks and Logopolis) and in Ashes to Ashes, Foyle's War, and The Crimson Petal and the White.

Georgeson's film credits included A Fish Called Wanda (1988), where his character's name was a play on his own ('George Thomason'), and the follow-up film Fierce Creatures (1997) as a spectator at the sea-lion centre. Georgeson was also well known for his stage work and was nominated for a 2002 London Evening Standard Theatre Award for Best Actor for his performance in Frozen at the Cottesloe Theatre (RNT).

Georgeson died in London on 18 March 2026, at the age of 89.

== Filmography ==
=== Film ===
Year	Title	Role	Notes
1969	The Assistant	(unknown)	Short film
1972	Up the Chastity Belt	Merry Man	Uncredited roles
1980	Sky Pirates	Diamond Smuggler	Uncredited roles
1985	No Surrender	Mr. Ross	
1988	A Fish Called Wanda	George	
1997	Fierce Creatures	Sealion Spectator	
1997	FairyTale: A True Story	First Reporter	
1997	Downtime	Jimmy	
1998	The Land Girls	Mr. John Lawrence	
1999	Swing	Uncle Matty	
2002	Dead Drunk	Tom	Short film
2003	The Virgin of Liverpool	Father Keane	
2003	Man Dancin'	Father Gabriel Flynn	
2003	The Reckoning	Flint	
2006	Irish Jam	Father Duffy	
2006	Notes on a Scandal	Ted Mawson	
2007	Angel	Marvell	
2014	Electricity	Al	

=== Television ===
Year	Title	Role	Notes
1963	Born on This Tide	(unknown)	Television film
1968	All's Well That Ends Well	Second Soldier	Television film
1969	Armchair Theatre	Chauffeur	Episode: "Go On... It'll Do You Good"
1973	The Song of Songs	Conductor	Mini-series; episode 1
1973	Shabby Tiger	Kirkbride	Mini-series; episode: "The Mirror of Reason"
1973	Armchair Theatre	Barman	Episode: "The Death of Glory"
1974	Z-Cars	Joe Smales	Episode: "Pursuit"
1974	Village Hall	Royston Hargreaves	Episode: "Friendly Encounter"
1974–1976	Coronation Street	Eddie Royle	4 episodes
1975	Doctor Who	Kavell	Episodes: "Genesis of the Daleks: Parts 3–5"
1975	Crown Court	George Scott	Episodes: "The Extremist: Parts 1–3"
1975	Lizzie Dripping	Organiser	Episode: "Lizzie Dripping by the Sea"
1975	Rooms	Denny Midgley	Episodes: "Midgely: Parts 1 & 2"
1975	Kim & Co.	Jake Jackman	Episode: "The Disco Kid"
1976	Rocky O'Rourke	Flanaghan	2 episodes
1977	ITV Playhouse	Stuart	Episode: "The Proofing Session"
1977	Play for Today	Adler	Episode: "The Country Party"
1977	Fathers and Families	Ken Smith	Mini-series; episode: "Mother Song"
1977	Headmaster	Hart	5 episodes
1977	Rough Justice	Tony Penrose	Mini-series; episode: "Mutual Consent"
1977	The Peppermint Pig	James Greengrass	3 episodes
1977	Crown Court	Det. Sgt. Rice	Episodes: "Capers Among the Catacombs: Parts 1–3"
1978	The Professionals	Reed	Episode: "In the Public Interest"
1978	Play for Today	Journalist	Episode: "The After Dinner Joke"
1978	Z-Cars	Jim	Episode: "Pressure"
1979	Turtle's Progress	Peter Sutcliffe	Episode: #1.7
1979	ITV Playhouse	Malcolm Armstrong	Episode: "Going Back"
1980	The Black Stuff	Dixie Dean	Television film
1980	The English Programme	Mr. Davies	Episode: "The Boy with the Transistor Radio"
1980	The Professionals	Pymar	Episode: "Need to Know"
1981	When the Boat Comes In	Captain Moore	Episode: "Back to Dear Old Blighty"
1981	Doctor Who	Detective Inspector	Episodes: "Logopolis: Parts 1 & 2"
1981	Maybury	Alec Pulford	Episode: "A Fall from Grace"
1981	Goodbye Darling	Mick	Episode: "Barbara"
1982	Boys from the Blackstuff	Dixie Dean	Mini-series; 3 episodes
1983	Juliet Bravo	John Holden	Series 4; 10 episodes
1984	Scully	Isiah	Mini-series; 5 episodes
1985	Dempsey and Makepeace	Jack Cade	Episode: "Wheelman"
1985	The Last Place on Earth	P.O. Lashly	Mini-series; 6 episodes
1986	Strike It Rich!	David Morgan	6 episodes
1986	Unnatural Causes	Stanley	Episode: "Natural Talents"
1988	Les Girls	Conrad	7 episodes
1989	Screen One	Goodis	Episode: "Home Run"
1989	The Bill	Milan	Episode: "Fort Apache - Sun Hill"
1989–1990	The Manageress	Eddie Johnson	Series 1 & 2; 12 episodes
1990	Screen Two	Det. Supt. Moore	Episode: "The Man from the Pru"
1990	Stay Lucky	Punch	Episode: "Burning Your Boats"
1991	Devices and Desires	Ryan Blaney	Mini-series; 5 episodes
1991	Casualty	Tim Talbot	Episode: "Judgement Day"
1991	G.B.H.	Lou Barnes	Mini-series; 7 episodes
1992	The Bill	Derek Townson	Episode: "Licence"
1992–1994	Between the Lines	DI Harry Naylor	Series 1–3; 35 episodes
1993	Scene	Myles	Episode: "Dear Life"
1993	Resnick	Grice	Series 2; episodes: "Rough Treatment: Parts 1 & 2"
1996	Delta Wave	Roy Valentine	Episodes: "Dodgy Jammers: Parts 1 & 2"
1996	Bramwell	Peter Mills	Episode: #2.1
1996	Ellington	Martin Shand	Episode: "Matchmaker"
1996	Lyddie	Mr. Marsden	Television film
1996	The Treasure Seekers	Bates	Television film
1997	Cadfael	Lord Giffard	Episode: "The Raven in the Foregate"
1997	Q.E.D.	Ray Peters	Episode: "Cause of Death"
1997	The Locksmith	Peter Thorogood	Mini-series; episode: "Full Moon"
1997	Peak Practice	Bill Jackson	Episode: "The Price"
1998	Wuthering Heights	Joseph	Television film
1998	Hetty Wainthropp Investigates	Harry Carter	Episode: "Family Values"
1998–1999	Liverpool 1	DI Howard Jones	Series 1 & 2; 12 episodes
1999	A Touch of Frost	Jim Scott	Episode: "One Man's Meat"
1999	Silent Witness	Brian McNally	Episodes: "A Kind of Justice: Parts 1 & 2"
1999	Dalziel and Pascoe	Jack Allgood	Episode: "On Beulah Height"
2000	The Bill	Ch. Insp. Caine	Episode: "Over the Edge"
2000	City Central	Alfie Stokes	Episode: "Nutcase"
2000	Heartburn Hotel	Tony	Episode: "Kin"
2002	Holby City	Len Wilton	Episode: "Pawns in the Game"
2002	Animated Tales of the World	Jacob (voice)	Episode: "The Enchanted Lion"
2002	Ultimate Force	Brian Duggan	Episode: "The Killing House"
2003	Clocking Off	Dave Eastwood	Episode: "Grace and Faz's Story"
2003	Foyle's War	Richard Hunter	Episode: "Fifty Ships"
2004	Doctors	Tony Rees	Episode: "Passing By"
2004	Agatha Christie's Poirot	Inspector Grange	Episode: "The Hollow"
2004	Waking the Dead	Major Timothy Cooper	Episodes: "False Flag: Parts 1 & 2"
2005	Bleak House	Clamb	Mini-series; 14 episodes
2005	Heartbeat	Mr. Daniels	Episode: "Auld Acquaintance"
2005	Under the Greenwood Tree	Geoffrey Day	Television film
2005	The English Harem	Eric Pringle	Television film
2006	Midsomer Murders	Ron Chalk	Episode: "Dead Letters"
2006	The Inspector Lynley Mysteries	Michael Shand	Episode: "One Guilty Deed"
2008	Doctors	Tom Jacks	Episode: "Don't Be Afraid of the Dark"
2008	Hancock and Joan	Fred	Television film
2008	Mutual Friends	Frank	Episode: #1.6
2009	The Royal	Duncan Crosby	Episode: "Busman's Holiday"
2009	Ashes to Ashes	Stanley Mitchell	Episode: #2.6
2010	Shameless	Jock	Episode: "Boxer"
2010	Holby City	Ernie Bostridge	Episode: "The Last Day of Summer"
2011	Justice	Father Jim	Mini-series; 5 episodes
2011	The Crimson Petal and the White	Henry Rackham Senior	Mini-series; 3 episodes
2011	The Suspicions of Mr Whicher	Superintendent Foley	Episode: "The Murder at Road Hill House"
2011	Doctors	Stan Carlton	Episode: "Coming of Age"
2011	Law & Order: UK	Bernard Rawlins	Episode: "Haunted"
2012	Casualty	Finlay 'Snapper' Morgan	Episode: "I'll See You in My Dreams"
2012	The Hollow Crown	Bardolph	3 episodes
2013	Way to Go	Paddy Brennan	2 episodes
2013	Frankie	Clive Harvey	Episode: #1.4
2014	New Tricks	Jason Harvey	Episode: "In Vino Veritas"
2015	Casualty	Harry Shallcross	Episode: "Estranged"
