= Man Dancin' =

- Directed by: Norman Stone
- Produced by: Terry Black; Peter Barber-Fleming
- Starring: Alex Ferns; James Cosmo; Tom Georgeson; Kenneth Cranham; Jenny Foulds
- Cinematography: Mike Fox
- Edited by: Colin Goudie
- Music by: Colin Towns
- Distributed by: 1 A Productions
- Release dates: 16 May 2003 (Cannes); 20 February 2004 (UK)
- Running time: 109 minutes
- Country: Scotland
- Language: English

Man Dancin' is a 2003 Scottish crime drama film directed by Norman Stone and starring Alex Ferns, James Cosmo, Tom Georgeson, Kenneth Cranham and Jenny Foulds.

== Plot ==
Ex-boxer Jimmy Kerrigan (Alex Ferns) is released from a Northern Irish prison after serving a nine-year sentence for arms trafficking and returns to the Glasgow council estate he grew up on where he immediately find his heroin addict younger brother, Terry (Cas Harkins), being attacked by two thugs for dealing drugs on a rival gang's turf. He elects to take Terry's punishment for him and is badly beaten by the hoodlums. Word of Jimmy's release soon reaches Donnie McGlone (James Cosmo), the crime lord he once served, and he is taken to McGlone's home by two henchman for a meeting with his former boss who tries to bring him back into his crew. Jimmy explains that he wishes to leave crime behind, see out the rest of his probation and move to Greece but McGlone suspects his reform is a feint to disguise personal ambition and has D.I. Walter "Pancho" Villers (Kenneth Cranham), a corrupt policeman with whom he is in league, rough Jimmy up in an attempt to gauge how much criminal mentality he has left. The villains also recruit the disillusioned Terry as a paid informant to report Jimmy's movements to them.

As part of his parole, Jimmy is forced to join a Passion Play run by Father Gabriel Flynn (Tom Georgeson) at the local church. Though reluctant at first, he soon commits to the project and embarks on something of a crusade to save people around him and bring them into the play; he forces Terry to go cold turkey after finding him shooting up in the toilets of The Garage nightclub, and rescues abused prostitute Maria Gallagher (Jenny Foulds) from her brutal pimp Des Airlie (Gavin Mitchell), one of McGlone's men. This sparks a change of mood on the estate as two of Maria's fellow ex-prostitute friends seek refuge with Jimmy and the play, and the locals refuse to be mistreated by Donnie McGlone's gangsters.

In an attempt to halt his efforts, McGlone persuades Villers to arrest Jimmy on the grounds of pimping, claiming that he has in fact poached Airlie's girls and is now procuring them himself. However, when the police seek to apprehend him at the church hall, they find that he has organized an anti-crime movement and is holding a press conference. Jimmy sarcastically thanks Villers and his men for their assistance in helping the community in front of the local journalists and, fearing a loss of face, Villers backs off. The more defiant Jimmy and the local community become of organized crime, the more McGlone's gang try to break their spirit. Firstly, the church hall is firebombed and then Johnny "Bus Stop" (Tam White), a blind local musician, is killed in a vicious hit and run attack. Father Gabriel subsequently intends to disband the play, but Jimmy convinces him that the church group can raise enough funds to continue it by singing for charity at the local shopping centre. The group travel in a van ironically painted with the Ulster Banner which was given to them by Billy Maddison (Ron Donachie), an Ulster loyalist gangster and old acquaintance of Jimmy, who wanted to assure the Catholic community that the church attack was not an act of sectarian violence.

Incensed at Villers' failure to eliminate Jimmy, McGlone has his henchmen abduct him, give him what they think is a fatal heroin overdose and leave him for dead. He survives, however, and begins an escape to Sunderland in the church's van alongside Terry, Maria and Lenny Quinn, his longtime friend and a former employee of Donnie McGlone. In an act of betrayal, Terry informs McGlone of their journey who then sends his right-hand man Flex to make chase. Finally catching up to them at the Angel of the North in Gateshead, Flex shoots Jimmy dead but allows the others to live. In the closing scene, the church group is shown continuing with the Passion Play despite Jimmy's demise.

== Cast ==
- Alex Ferns as Jimmy Kerrigan, a former gangster and boxer attempting to turn his life around after serving a nine-year prison term for arms trafficking in Northern Ireland.
- James Cosmo as Donnie McGlone, a Glasgow crime lord and Jimmy's former boss.
- Kenneth Cranham as D.I. Walter "Pancho" Villers, a corrupt policeman in league with McGlone.
- Tom Georgeson as Father Gabriel Flynn, a Catholic priest in charge of the Passion Play at Jimmy's local church.
- Jenny Foulds as Maria Gallagher, former prostitute and Jimmy's love interest.
- Gerald Lepkowski as Lenny Quinn, one of McGlone's henchmen and Jimmy's longtime friend.
- Cas Harkins as Terry Kerrigan, Jimmy's heroin addict younger brother.
- Tam White as Johnny "Bus Stop", a blind local musician and friend of Jimmy.
- Stewart Porter as Flex, McGlone's main henchman.
- Gavin Mitchell as Des Airlie, Jenny's brutal pimp.
- Ron Donachie as Billy Maddison, an Ulster loyalist gangster.
- Kay Gallie as Margaret Kerrigan, Jimmy and Terry's ailing mother.
- Sarah Finch as Elizabeth Black, a snobbish member of the Passion Play who rebels against Jimmy's involvement.
- James Bryce as Sebastian Black, Elizabeth's equally stuck-up husband.
- Frank Gallagher as Frank McIvor, a member of the Passion Play who remains loyal to Jimmy.
- Gowan Calder as Fiona, a member of the Passion play.
- Garry Sweeney as Norrie, one of McGlone's men who lures Johnny to his death.
- Lesley Stone as Laura McGlone, Donnie's wife.
- Bridget McCann as Helen Scott, Jimmy's probation officer.

== Production ==
The film was shot in twenty-two days during late 2002 in locations in and around Glasgow including Greenock, Govan, Ibrox (including Ibrox Parish Church) and Pollokshields, and in Gateshead.

== Release ==
The film debuted at the 2003 Cannes Film Festival on 16 May 2003 and had limited theatrical release in the United Kingdom on 20 February 2004.

=== Critical reception ===
The film received mostly poor or mixed reviews from critics. Man Dancin' won the Outstanding Original Screenplay Award at the Sacramento Film Festival as well as the Critics' Choice and Gold Remi Awards at the WorldFest-Houston International Film Festival.
