= Gerald Lepkowski =

Australian actor

- Born: 10 February 1966 (age 60); Glasgow, Scotland
- Education: Western Australian Academy of Performing Arts (WAAPA)
- Occupation: Actor
- Notable work: Dirt Game (2009); East West 101 (2009)
- Spouse: Frances O'Connor (m. 2011)
- Children: 1

Gerald Lepkowski is a British-Australian television and stage actor, who has had guest roles in Australian and British productions, before landing the lead role in drama series Dirt Game in Australia in 2009.

== Early life ==
Born in 1966 the Sighthill area of Glasgow, Scotland, Lepkowski is the second child of Edward Lepkowski, a carpet fitter of Polish descent; and Catherine Lepkowski (née Murray) who is of Irish descent. He has a brother, Edward Jr, and a sister, Carol.

While travelling in Australia in his early twenties, Lepkowski became interested in acting and trained at the Western Australian Academy of Performing Arts where he met his future wife, fellow British-born thespian, Frances O'Connor.

== Career ==
Lepkowski worked extensively in Australia on the stage, including playing Tysefew in The Dutch Courtesan, Claudio in Much Ado About Nothing, Roger & Arthur in The Balcony, Vershinin in Three Sisters, Krogstaad in A Doll's House and Orsino in Twelfth Night, all with the Melbourne Theatre Company.

From 1994, Lepkowski went on to appear in guest roles in several Australian and British TV series, including The Damnation of Harvey McHugh and Neighbours (both 1994), Halifax f.p. (1996), State Coroner (1997), Monarch of the Glen (2001), Two Thousand Acres of Sky (2003) and EastEnders (2005).

In 2002, Lepkowski landed the lead role in the award-winning Scottish romantic comedy film, American Cousins, starring alongside Shirley Henderson, Danny Nucci and Hollywood stars Dan Hedaya and Vincent Pastore. The same year he appeared in British film, Man Dancin', which starred EastEnders actor Alex Ferns.

In 2009, he starred in the lead role of Dirt Game, an Australian drama series that aired on ABC1. He also starred in season 2 of SBS drama series East West 101. It began airing in mid-October 2009. In 2010, Lepkowski appeared in the Australian telemovie Sisters of War as Bishop Leo Scharmach.

In 2016 he appeared as Zanrush, a red priest, in "The Red Woman", the sixth-season premiere episode of HBO series Game of Thrones.

== Personal life ==
Lepkowski is married to actor Frances O'Connor, with whom he now has one child, born in 2005. The couple currently reside in the Los Angeles area, in the United States.

== Filmography ==
=== Film ===
Year	Title	Role	Notes
1996	River Street	Constable Monroe	
2002	Doctor Sleep	Journalist	
2003	American Cousins	Roberto	
2003	Man Dancin'	Lenny Quinn	
2003	16 Years of Alcohol	Male Actor	
2007	Oh Happy Day	Rob	
2010	Beneath Hill 60	William Waddell	
2017	The Death of Stalin	Leonid Brezhnev	
2020	Measure for Measure	Boyle	
2021	RAV1043	Ravi	Short film
2022	Emily	Mr Linton	

==== As writer / director ====
Year	Title	Role	Notes
2024	Broono	Writer / Director	Short film

=== Television ===
Year	Title	Role	Notes
1994	The Damnation of Harvey McHugh	Detective	Miniseries, 1 episode
1994–1999	Blue Heelers	Marcus Jacobs / Paul McLauglin	2 episodes
1995	Correlli	Officer Tyler	Miniseries
1995	Neighbours	Marty Hackman	2 episodes
1996	Mercury	Kevin Kinsella	Miniseries, 2 episodes
1996	The Genie from Down Under	Jeweller	1 episode
1996	Halifax f.p.	Ari	3 episodes
1997	The Last of the Ryans	Patterson	TV movie
1997	State Coroner	Dave Warren	1 episode
1998	Good Guys, Bad Guys	Tierney	1 episode
1999	Witch Hunt	Kisho	TV movie
2001	Monarch of the Glen	Hugh	1 episode
2001	Randall & Hopkirk (Deceased)	Big Gerald	1 episode
2003	Two Thousand Acres of Sky	Hamish Raeburn	2 episodes
2005	EastEnders	DC Monaghan	3 episodes
2005	Spooks	Joe Kennedy	2 episodes
2001–2007	The Bill	DCI Alan Lees / Charlie McGann	2 episodes
2007	The IT Crowd	Jorg	1 episode
2009	Dirt Game	Brian Jardine	6 episodes
2009	East West 101	Agent Richard Skeritt	Season 2, 7 episodes
2010	Sisters of War	Bishop Leo Scharmach	Miniseries
2014	Katie Morag	Geordie	1 episode
2016	Game of Thrones	Zanrush	Season 6, 2 episodes
2016	Harley and the Davidsons	William Davidson	Miniseries, 4 episodes
2017	Silent Witness	Stuart Teller	2 episodes
2024	The Twelve	Chris Moore	Season 2, 5 episodes

== Stage ==
Year	Title	Role	Notes
1990	Memory Rooms		Moores Building, Fremantle for Gemellaggio Festival
1991	Pack of Lies		Acting Studio, Perth with WAAPA
1991	Whale		Bunbury Regional Entertainment Centre with WAAPA
1992	The Slab Boys		Crossroads Theatre, Sydney with O'Punksky's Theatre Company
1992; 1998	D.A.R.K. The Adventures of Diane Arbus		Kaff Theatre, Perth, Universal Theatre, Melbourne (also writer)
1993	The Misanthrope	Alceste	Napier Street Theatre, Melbourne with Actors and Punters
1993	The Dutch Courtesan	Tysefew	Russell Street Theatre, Melbourne, with MTC
1993	Much Ado About Nothing	Claudio	Playhouse, Melbourne, Theatre Royal, Hobart, Princess Theatre, Launceston with MTC
1994	The Sisters Rosensweig		Playhouse, Melbourne, Monash University, Melbourne, Theatre Royal, Hobart, Geelong Arts Centre, Wharf Theatre, Sydney, Glen Street Theatre, Sydney, Canberra Theatre, His Majesty's Theatre, Perth with MTC
1997	The Balcony	Roger / Arthur	Fairfax Studio, Melbourne with MTC
1997	Three Sisters	Vershinin	Fairfax Studio, Melbourne with MTC
1997	A Doll's House	Krogstaad	Fairfax Studio, Melbourne with MTC
1998	Twelfth Night	Orsino	Playhouse, Melbourne with MTC
1999	The Sick Room	Mr Hilbert / Priest	Malthouse Theatre, Melbourne with Playbox Theatre Company
2000	The Ecstatic Bible		Scott Theatre, Adelaide
