= American Cousins =

- DVD cover
- Directed by: Don Coutts
- Written by: Sergio Casci
- Produced by: Margaret Matheson
- Starring: Danny Nucci; Gerald Lepkowski; Shirley Henderson; Vincent Pastore; Dan Hedaya; Russell Hunter; Olegar Fedoro; Stevan Rimkus
- Cinematography: Jerry Kelly
- Edited by: Lindy Cameron
- Music by: Donald Shaw
- Release date: November 28, 2003
- Running time: 91 minutes
- Country: United States
- Language: English

American Cousins is a 2003 romantic comedy film directed by Don Coutts and starring Danny Nucci, Gerald Lepkowski, Shirley Henderson, Vincent Pastore, Dan Hedaya, Russell Hunter, Olegar Fedoro, and Stevan Rimkus. The plot is about a Scots-Italian fish and chip shop owner who gives refuge to his Mafia relatives when they go on the run. It was voted one of the top three Scottish films of all time by readers of The List magazine.

== Premise ==
Two New Jersey mobsters are almost killed when a deal in Eastern Europe goes wrong. They take refuge with their law-abiding cousin Bobby, who runs a fish and chip shop in Glasgow, Scotland. However, when one of the Americans takes a shine to Bobby's girl and the other clashes with local hoodlums, Bobby realises he has to stand up for himself or risk losing everything he loves.

== Cast ==
- Dan Hedaya as Settimo
- Danny Nucci as Gino
- Russell Hunter as Nonno
- Shirley Henderson as Alice
- Gerald Lepkowski as Roberto
- Olegar Fedoro as Taras
- Stephen Graham as Henry
- Jake Abraham as Vince
- Vincent Pastore as Tony
- John Henshaw as Nigel

== Production ==
American Cousins was the debut feature for director Don Coutts, screenwriter Sergio Casci, Director of Photography Jerry Kelly and Editor Lindy Cameron The team had previously made three shorts: St. Antony's Day Off (1995), Rose (1998) and Dead Sea Reels (1996) which won the Vendôme Film Festival award for Best European Short Film.

The film was produced by Margaret Matheson, whose credits include Antonia (1995), winner of the 1996 Academy Award for Best Foreign Language Film.

== Awards ==
- Audience Award BAFTA Scotland
- Best Screenplay BAFTA Scotland (Sergio Casci)
- Best Actress Cherbourg-Octeville Festival (Shirley Henderson)
- Jury Award Newport Beach Film Festival
- Best Film Milan International Film Festival
- Best Director Milan International Film Festival (Don Coutts)
- Audience Award Milan International Film Festival

Screenwriter Sergio Casci was also nominated for the BAFTA Carl Foreman Award.
