= Animal Park (1991 TV series) =

Television series

- Starring: Zoe Bertram; Mark Hembrow; Alyce Platt
- Country of origin: Australia
- Original language: English
- No. of episodes: 16

Production
- Producer: Ken Methold

Original release
- Release: 1 December 1991 – 15 March 1992

Animal Park is a 1991 children's television series on the Seven Network. The series follows the adventures of three children who rebuild a run-down animal park on the central Queensland coast.

== Cast ==
- Anthony Hayes as Damien Halliday
- Zoe Bertram as Sarah Halliday
- Mark Hembrow as Jim Pryor
- Alyce Platt as Christina Hoffman
- Erin Coombs as Becky Halliday
- Goran Ristovski as Tony Medotti
- Janelle Owen as Jenny Halliday
- Christopher Elliott as Dad
