= Brendan Maher (director) =

Brendan Maher is a director of numerous episodes of Australian television series and several British TV series and feature films.

He directed episodes of Five Mile Creek (c. 1985), The Flying Doctors (c. 1986), Glass Babies (1985) and Skirts (1990).

Later Australian credits include the TV series Tomorrow, When the War Began, Sisters of War, The Cooks, White Collar Blue and The Secret Life of Us; also the telemovies Secret Bridesmaids' Business and an adaptation of Society Murders.

He directed the series Outlander, and The Passing Bells for the BBC, also episodes of Spartacus, Upstairs Downstairs, Silent Witness, and a TV adaptation of Wide Sargasso Sea.

== Recognition ==
Maher won AFI awards for Best Director for The Road from Coorain and After the Deluge; also an Australian Directors Guild Award for Best Direction in a TV Mini-Series for Dirt Game.
