= Christopher Rush (writer) =

Scottish writer (born 1944)

- Born: 23 November 1944; St Monans, Scotland
- Occupation: Writer; educator

Christopher Rush (born 23 November 1944) is a Scottish writer, born in St Monans and for thirty years a teacher of literature in Edinburgh. His books include A Twelvemonth and a Day (chosen by The List magazine in 2005 as one of the 100 best Scottish books of all time) and the highly acclaimed To Travel Hopefully.

In 1983 Rush initiated a literary debate in The Scottish Review: Arts and Environment by suggesting that the up-and-coming generation of Scottish poets drew less on their native places than their elders.

A Twelvemonth and a Day served as inspiration for the film Venus Peter, released in 1989. The story was also reworked by Rush in a simplified version in 1992 as a children's picture book, Venus Peter Saves the Whale, illustrated by Mairi Hedderwick, which won the Friends of the Earth 1993 Earthworm Award for the book published that year that would most help children to enjoy and care for the Earth.

His 2007 book Will recounts the life of William Shakespeare in the first person, and has been optioned for a movie by Ben Kingsley. It was published by Beautiful Books Limited (UK). Rush also wrote a memoir of himself called Sex, Lies and Shakespeare, published by Beautiful Books Limited in 2009 (UK).

Rush now lives near his childhood home.

== Bibliography ==
=== Books ===
- Resurrection of a Kind (1984)
- A Twelvemonth and a Day, Aberdeen University Press (1985). ISBN 9780080324289
- Peace Comes Dropping Slow, Ramsay Head Press, Edinburgh (1989), ISBN 9780902859784
- Into the Ebb (1989)
- Venus Peter Saves the Whale (1992)
- Last Lesson of the Afternoon (1994)
- To Travel Hopefully (2006)
- Hellfire and Herring (Hardback & Paperback) (2006)
- Will (Beautiful Books Limited) (2007)
- Sex, Lies and Shakespeare (Beautiful Books Limited) (2009)
- Aunt Epp's Guide for Life - from chastity to copper kettles, musings of a Victorian Lady (Michael O'Mara Books Limited) (2009)

=== Articles ===
- Elephants in Anstruther: In Search of the Scottish Identity, in Lindsay, Maurice (ed.), The Scottish Review: Arts and Environment 31, August 1983, pp. 43 – 48, ISSN 0140-0894
- Review of Noise and Smoky Breath: An Illustrated Anthology of Glasgow Poems 1900 - 1983 edited by Hamish Whyte, in Lindsay, Maurice (ed.), The Scottish Review: Arts and Environment 31, August 1983, pp. 51 – 53, ISSN 0140-0894

== Reviews ==
- Urquhart, Fred (1983), review of Peace Comes Dropping Slow, in Lindsay, Maurice (ed.), The Scottish Review: Arts and Environment 31, August 1983, pp. 50 & 51, ISSN 0140-0894
- Wallace, Gavin ( 1984), A Scottish Triptych, which includes a review of Peace Comes Dropping Slow, in Hearn, Sheila G. (ed.), Cencrastus No. 15, New Year 1984, pp.53 & 54, ISSN 0264-0856
