= The Last of the Ryans =

1997 film

- Directed by: George Ogilvie
- Written by: Graeme Farmer
- Produced by: Richard Brennan
- Starring: Richard Roxburgh; Zoe Bertram; Ian Mune
- Cinematography: Jaems Grant
- Edited by: Vicki Ambrose
- Music by: Bruce Smeaton
- Release date: 1997
- Running time: 95 minutes
- Country: Australia
- Language: English

The Last of the Ryans is a 1997 Australian biopic TV film about Ronald Ryan.

== Plot ==
A biopic following the escape, recapture, and hanging of Ronald Ryan for the murder of prison guard George Hodson.

== Cast ==
- Richard Roxburgh as Ronald Ryan
- Zoe Bertram as Dorothy Ryan
- Ian Mune as Henry Bolte
- Paul Sonkkila as Governor Ian Grindlay
- Tony Barry as Father Brosnan
- Douglas Hedge as Philip Opas
- Tom Long as Peter Walker
- Julie Herbert as Cecilia Ryan
- Maxie Rickard as Jan Ryan
- Ashleigh McInnes as Pip Ryan
- Ebonnie Masini as Wendy Ryan
- Matthew Quartermaine as Ipana
- Humphrey Bower as Bolte's Secretary
- Ian Smith as Sir Arthur Rylah
- Gerald Lepkowski as Patterson
- Mark Pegler as Helmut Lange
- Philip Reilley as George Hodson
- Dennis Miller as Harold
- Beverley Dunn as Ethel
- Jane Harber as Lyn Hughan
- Samuel Johnson as Young journalist
- Brett Tucker as Detective

== Production ==
The film came about through the research of Janne Dennehy, in part looking at the family Ryan left behind. It was picked up by Crawfords and the Nine Network, who produced and screened the telemovie. It went into production at the end of 1996.

== Controversy ==
Hodson's daughter criticised the movie for its portrayal of her father, "I don't think my father was portrayed in the correct light at all. They've made him look a bit silly." She said it was disappointing and disrespectful to show him as "a bit of a clown".

== Reception ==
The Last of the Ryans did poorly in the ratings, where it lost over 100,000 viewers after the first 15 minutes.

Peter Weiniger of The Age chose it as his pick of the week, concluding, "'The Last of the Ryans' takes a while to get its rhythm, but once it outlines the various aspects - legal, political and personal - to the Ryan case, it becomes a moving and tense drama that provides a fresh perspective on a traumatic episode from our not-too-distant past." Also in The Age, Simon Hughes was not as positive, saying, 'There is something lifeless about the whole production. Like a room that has had the air sucked from it, there is an atmosphere here antithetical to the senses."

== Awards ==
- 1997 AFI Awards
  - Best Mini-Series or Telefeature - Richard Brennan - nominated
