= Wilbur Wants to Kill Himself =

- Directed by: Lone Scherfig
- Written by: Lone Scherfig; Anders Thomas Jensen
- Starring: Jamie Sives; Adrian Rawlins; Shirley Henderson; Lisa McKinlay; Mads Mikkelsen; Julia Davis
- Cinematography: Jørgen Johansson
- Edited by: Gerd Tjur
- Music by: Joachim Holbek
- Production companies: Zentropa Entertainments 6 Wilbur Lt
- Release date: 8 November 2002
- Countries: Denmark; United Kingdom
- Language: English
- Budget: $4 million
- Box office: $1.9 million

Wilbur Wants to Kill Himself is a 2002 Danish-Scottish drama film directed by Lone Scherfig and starring Jamie Sives, Adrian Rawlins, Shirley Henderson, Lisa McKinlay, Mads Mikkelsen, and Julia Davis. Harbour and his suicidal brother, Wilbur, inherit their father's secondhand bookshop in their native Glasgow. Their lives become entangled with a woman called Alice and her young daughter, Mary, after the two visit the shop. Idealistic Mary captures Wilbur's heart, and may be able to help save his life or help him find peace.

== Plot ==
When Wilbur leaves the hospital after having tried once more to kill himself, the staff ask his brother Harbour to let Wilbur move in with him. The brothers thus share their childhood flat, which is adjacent to the bookshop their father left them.

Uninterested in the family business, Wilbur works in a nursery. Harbour manages the shop and meets Alice, who sells him books she finds when working as a hospital cleaner. When she is sacked for always being late, she visits Harbour to explain why she will not be coming again. Following his brother's advice on "grabbing" women, Harbour asks Alice to marry him. The wedding meal is held at an Asian restaurant and allows Wilbur to get acquainted with Sophie, Alice's ex-colleague from the hospital. The two start flirting, but Wilbur pushes Sophie away after she licks his ear. After the meal, Wilbur goes back home and slits his wrists in the bath.

Harbour finds his brother just in time and Alice saves Wilbur by using towels to stop the bleeding. While discussing Wilbur with Alice, Harbour tells her his brother feels responsible for their mother's death.

As he is about to leave the hospital, Wilbur gets a nurse named Moira, infatuated with him, to lick his ear. Instead of reciprocating the favour, he wipes his ear and leaves the room. At the same time, a few doors along, Harbour is told by a doctor that he needs to stay in the hospital for some tests. Harbour refuses because he wants to be at home with his new family.

Wilbur, Harbour, Alice and Mary live together, allowing them to get acquainted. Before Mary's birthday party, Alice asks Harbour to buy some whipped cream at the supermarket, where he has a fit. He wakes up at the hospital, where Dr Horst, a psychologist he has met often through Wilbur, tries to convince him to get treatment for pancreatic cancer. The two men share a bottle of whisky, Dr Horst believing that such is the condition of Harbour's liver that a little alcohol will be insignificant. Wilbur goes back to the bookshop to bring Alice the whipped cream for Mary's party. When a little girl asks him to stand on his head, he throws up on her dress. Harbour is put to bed; as Wilbur and Alice tidy up after the party, they kiss briefly until she says she cannot continue.

The next day, Wilbur tries to jump off a building, only to realise he does not want to. He goes home to apologise to Alice for kissing her, but they do so again.

Dr Horst tells Harbour he must explain his very serious situation to his family, but he does not know how to.

To fight the mutual attraction Wilbur has with Alice, Wilbur decides to make nurse Moira his girlfriend. One evening, as they are all out for a meal, Moira tells the family they should change their eating habits to help Harbour during his chemotherapy. Furious at Harbour for not getting treatment, Alice takes him to hospital and spends the night there with him despite Harbour being scared that Wilbur might try to kill himself. The latter, having stayed at home to take care of Mary, decides not to commit suicide when he realises the little girl needs him. Wilbur resigns from his job to replace his brother at the bookshop. Harbour's condition does not improve, so his doctor allows him to spend his last Christmas at the bookshop.

After dinner, as Harbour tucks Mary into bed, she asks him if he is going to spend the night in Wilbur's room, implying that Wilbur will be in Alice's. As he is about to take a taxi back to the hospital, Harbour asks his brother to take care of Alice and Mary. In his hospital room, Harbour takes an overdose of pills and trims his fingernails before lying in bed fully clothed. The film ends with Wilbur, Alice, and Mary visiting Harbour's grave.

== Cast ==
- Jamie Sives as Wilbur
- Adrian Rawlins as Harbour
- Shirley Henderson as Alice
- Lisa McKinlay as Mary
- Mads Mikkelsen as Horst
- Julia Davis as Moira
- Susan Vidler as Sophie
- Jonah Burgess as Steve

== Reception ==
The film has been well received by audiences. Review aggregator Rotten Tomatoes, based on 77 reviews, gives the film an 83% approval, the average rating being 7.1/10. The website’s critics consensus states: "Despite its morbid subject matter, Wilbur is a charming and often funny film." On Metacritic, the film has a score of 69 out of 100, based on 26 critics, indicating "generally favorable reviews".
