= Venus Peter =

- Directed by: Ian Sellar
- Written by: Ian Sellar; Christopher Rush
- Produced by: Christopher Young
- Starring: Gordon R. Strachan; Ray McAnally; David Hayman; Sinéad Cusack; Caroline Paterson
- Cinematography: Gabriel Beristain
- Edited by: David Spiers
- Music by: Jonathan Dove
- Release date: 1989
- Running time: 94 minutes
- Country: United Kingdom
- Language: English
- Budget: £1,310,000
- Box office: £14,229 (UK)

Venus Peter is a 1989 Scottish film directed by Ian Sellar and produced by Christopher Young for Young films. The film is an adaptation of the novel A Twelvemonth and a Day by Christopher Rush. It was screened in the Un Certain Regard section at the 1989 Cannes Film Festival. It was filmed in Orkney, in the North of Scotland. The film crew paid members of the Orkney community to act as extras in the film.

In 1999 Richard Mowe, curator of film at the National Museum of Scotland, chose the film as one of his top twenty Scottish films of the century.

Japanese rock band Venus Peter are named after the film.

== Plot ==
The film is set on a northern isle of Scotland in the 1940s and follows young Peter and his relationship in the mainly adult world of the fishing village and his relationship with the sea and fishing boats (foremost of which is Kirkcaldy-registered KY199). The most important relationship is between Peter and his fisherman grandfather.

== Cast ==
- George Anton as Billy
- Louise Breslin as Leebie
- Juliet Cadzow as Princess Paloma
- Peter Caffrey as Father
- Sinéad Cusack as Miss Balsilbie
- Emma Dingwall as Jenny
- Ken Drury as Gowans
- Christopher Fairbank as Blind man
- Cecil Garson as Gollie
- David Hayman as Kinnear
- Sam Hayman as Baby Peter
- Scott Heddle as Peem
- Ray Jeffries as Bank manager
- Sheila Keith as Epp
- Mary MacLeod as Miss Sangster
- Ray McAnally as Grandpa
- Alex McAvoy as Beadle
- Robin McCaffrey as Georgina
- Julia McCarthy as Agnes
- Caroline Paterson as Mother
- Gordon R. Strachan as Peter
- Alan Tall as McCreevie
- Cameron Stout as Bystander
- Lorraine Buchan as Bystander
- Justin Kimmett as Little Boy
- Martin Brown as child in class
