= Mairi Hedderwick =

Scottish illustrator and author

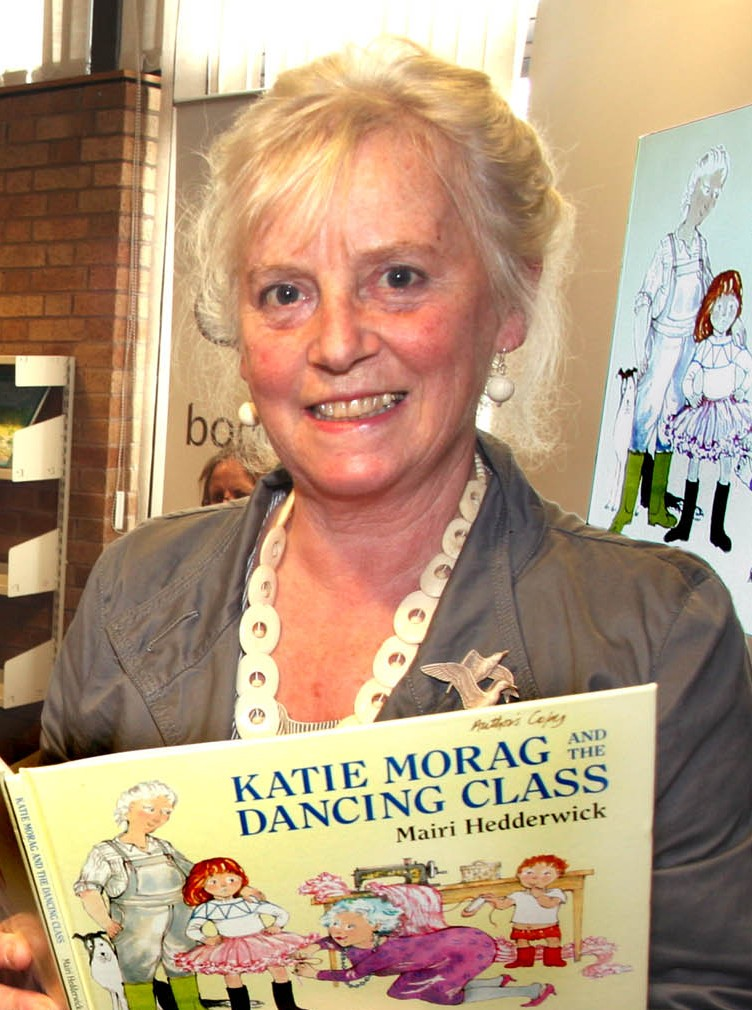
Mairi Hedderwick at Wishaw library in 2007

Mairi Hedderwick (born 2 May 1939) is a Scottish illustrator and author, known for the Katie Morag series of children's picture books set on the Isle of Struay, a fictional counterpart of the inner Hebridean island of Coll where Hedderwick has lived at various times for much of her life.

She has also written several books of travel writing for adults, and is the illustrator of a range of Hebridean stationery.

== Life ==
Mairi Crawford Lindsay was born in Gourock on 2 May 1939, the daughter of Douglas Lindsay, an architect who died suddenly when she was thirteen, and Margaret Crawford; she is the granddaughter of the Scottish missionary Dan Crawford.

She was educated at Gourock primary school and then at the independent St Columba's School for Girls in nearby Kilmacolm, but describes her childhood in the strict Christian household as "serious, very lonely", always feeling out of place. Instead she longed for the kind of carefree existence she would later depict in the Katie Morag stories, and used to wish herself "over the hills and far away" beyond the Cowal hills that she could see behind Kirn and Dunoon on the far side of the Firth of Clyde.

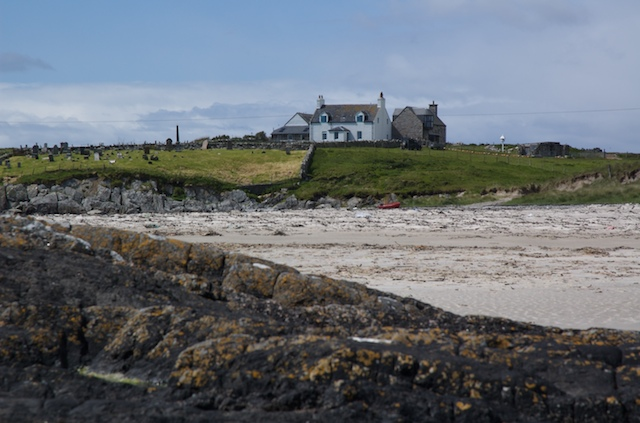
The farm at Crossapol

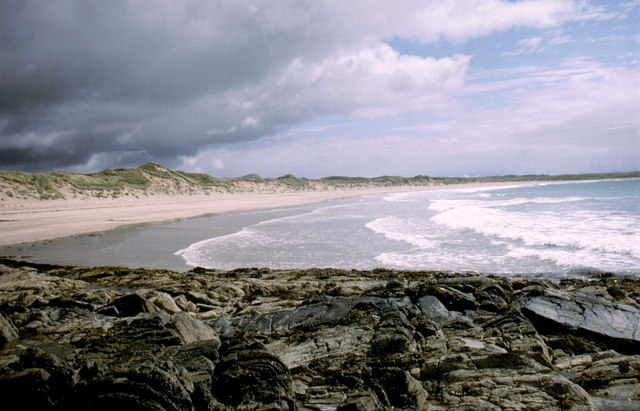
Crossapol Bay

In 1957, she went to Edinburgh College of Art, studying mural painting and ceramics, where she noticed an advertisement for a mother's help on the island of Coll. She went to the island for the first time that year, and then came back every summer of her student vacations.

After graduating she married Ronnie Hedderwick on 24 June 1962, and worked for two years as a travelling art teacher in Mid Argyll, qualifying at Jordanhill College of Education. The couple then spent eighteen months working respectively as a dairymaid and a cattleman on a large farm estate at Applecross in Wester Ross; but in 1965, three months after the birth of her first child, Mark Hedderwick, they moved to Coll, where they bought Crossapol, an isolated 19th-century farmhouse at the southern end of the island, with a big Rayburn stove and oil and gas lamps and a well, but neither electricity nor running water nor permanent road access, three miles from the next nearest house, at the end of a mile and a half of white sand beach. There the couple lived for ten years, raising their two children.

The couple had planned to make a living tending lobster pots and keeping a few sheep and cattle, but Hedderwick began using her artistic skills to supplement the family income, teaching in the local school, selling pictures to tourists, and in 1969 starting a printing business called the Malin Workshop producing postcards and calendars with drawings of wildlife and maps of the islands, initially all hand-printed without electricity.

A visitor she met on the beach one day turned out to be an editor at Macmillan Books; showing off the nearby house full of her watercolours, she was soon signed up as a contract illustrator for the company, winning an in-house contest to illustrate a version by Rumer Godden of The Old Woman who lived in a Vinegar Bottle (1972), and then three children's books featuring Janet Reachfar by the established Scottish author Jane Duncan.

With no secondary schools on the island, the family left Coll in 1973 and moved to Fort William on the mainland to remain all together. After Jane Duncan died in 1976, Hedderwick was encouraged by her editor to take the plunge and write and illustrate her own stories. However it was not until 1984, three publishers later, that the first of Hedderwick's Katie Morag stories, Katie Morag Delivers the Mail, finally appeared in print inspired by her time on Coll. The book was well received, and three more Katie Morag picturebooks rapidly followed in the next three years.

Hedderwick's marriage came to an end in the mid-1980s, and with her children now educated, she gave up a part-time job with the Highlands and Islands Development Board advising community co-operatives and in 1990 moved back to Coll, first letting and then fully buying back the house at Crossapol, where she found her children's childhood pictures still on the walls. In her next Katie Morag book, Katie Morag and the New Pier (1993), she addressed the issue of an island that was changing fast from the remote isolated place she had known in the 1960s. Another four Katie Morag books followed, but increasingly Hedderwick began to find herself becoming a not-entirely-willing tourist attraction on Coll in her own right, and after almost ten years she felt it was time to move on.

Five years in the Scottish Borders followed, succeeded by several years restoring a pair of cottages near Jemimaville on the Black Isle looking over the Cromarty Firth; but neither felt quite right, so in 2005 she decided to return again to Coll, where she had a new house built close to her daughter and grandchildren. As of 2013 Hedderwick is living on the mainland again, in Inverness-shire; she says she could have seen herself being a farmer's wife and "interior designer of houses in wild places", had she not been a writer.

== Works ==
As well as the Katie Morag series for which she is best known, which now runs to fourteen books and various omnibus collections, other books that Mairi Hedderwick has written and illustrated include:

- Peedie Peebles Summer or Winter Book (Bodley Head, 1989), for younger children, featuring a boisterous toddler, set on Orkney
- Peedie Peebles Colour Book (Bodley Head, 1994); paperback as Oh No, Peedie Peebles...! (Red Fox, 1997)
- Dreamy Robbie! (1993), Robbie's First Day at School (1993), Robbie's Trousers (1993), Robbie and Grandpa (1994), Robbie's Birthday (1994; all Oliver & Boyd), short 8 page self-read paperbacks for the "Reading 2000 Storytime" primary years reading programme
- The Tale of Carpenter MacPheigh (Blackie, 1994), part of Blackie's Folk Tales of the World series
- A Walk with Grannie (Hodder, 2003)
- The Utterly Otterlys (Hodder, 2006), about a family of otters on a search for a new home

For other authors, in addition to the Rumer Godden book and the three Janet Reachfar books by Jane Duncan in the 1970s already mentioned, Hedderwick in the 1980s contributed illustrations for a number of non-fiction books published by independent Aberdeenshire-based Northern Books; for a number of children's books in Gaelic published by Lisa Storey's Leabhraichean Beaga press in Inverness; and for four children's books by Moira Miller: Hamish and the Wee Witch (Methuen, 1986), Hamish and the Fairy Gifts (Methuen, 1988), Meet Maggie O'Muddle (Methuen, 1989), and A Kist O' Whistles: Scottish Folk Tales (André Deutsch, 1990).

In the 1990s she illustrated Christopher Rush's Venus Peter Saves the Whale (Canongate, 1992), a reworking of the story from his acclaimed 1985 novel A Twelvemonth and a Day and the 1989 film Venus Peter. The book won the Friends of the Earth 1993 Earthworm Award for the book published that year that would most help children to enjoy and care for the Earth.

Other books she has illustrated include Joan Lingard's Hands Off Our School! (Hamish Hamilton, 1992), a novel about the students of a small rural one-teacher primary school trying to save it from closure; and Tom Pow's Calum's Big Day (Iynx Publishing, 2000), a knockabout exploration of Scottish identity for five-year-olds.

=== Travel writing and stationery ===
Cover of Hedderwick's Hebridean Desk Diary 2009, showing the style of her watercolour sketches

In addition to her work for children, Mairi Hedderwick has produced several volumes of travel writing, accompanied by drawings and watercolour sketches, reflecting in often quite personal terms her feelings and experiences on four long Scottish journeys:

- An Eye on the Hebrides: An illustrated journey (Canongate 1989 / Birlinn 2009), a six-month-long odyssey through the Hebrides, visiting forty different islands from Arran to Lewis.
- Highland Journey: A sketching tour of Scotland (Canongate 1992 / Birlinn 2009), in which she retraces a sketching tour made by the obscure Victorian artist John Thomas Reid, comparing her experiences.
- Sea Change: The Summer Voyage from East to West Scotland of the Anassa (Canongate 1999 / Birlinn 2009), a six-week voyage down the Caledonian Canal and out to sea, undertaken to mark her leave-taking of Coll at the end of the 1990s.
- Shetland Rambles: A sketching tour (Birlinn 2011), retracing Victorian artist John Thomas Reid's sketching tour in and around Shetland.
- The Last Laird of Coll (Birlinn 2011), recollections of life on Coll and Kenneth Stewart, principal landowner on the island from 1942 until 1991.

Since 2005, the Scottish publisher Birlinn have published a steadily growing series of hardback stationery illustrated by Hedderwick. As of 2011 the range includes address books, birthday books, calendars and a number of different annual diaries, each featuring a multitude of different sketches by Hedderwick of the Highlands and the Hebrides.

== Recognition ==
Hedderwick was awarded an honorary degree from Stirling University in 2003, in recognition of "her outstanding contribution to writing and illustration in Scotland, especially for children".

She regularly visits primary schools and local book festivals, leading storytelling sessions and explaining how her books are created, often accompanied by Katie Morag's teddy bear who travels with her in his own black bag. In 1999, on the other side of the fence as she put it, she organised the children's author events for the first Wigtown Book Festival.
