= Tolsta Chaolais =

Coordinates: 58.241°N 6.782°W

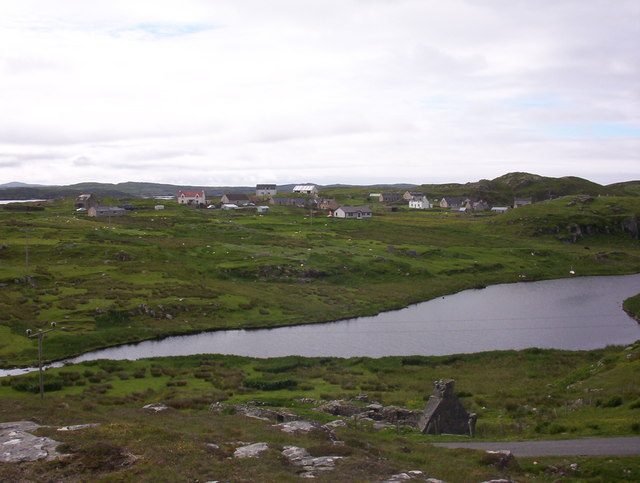
- Tolsta Chaolais village, across Loch a' Bhaile

- Location within the Outer Hebrides
- Language: Scottish Gaelic; English
- OS grid reference: NB194379
- Civil parish: Uig
- Council area: Na h-Eileanan Siar
- Lieutenancy area: Western Isles
- Country: Scotland
- Sovereign state: United Kingdom
- Post town: ISLE OF LEWIS
- Postcode district: HS2
- Dialling code: 01851
- Police: Scotland
- Fire: Scottish
- Ambulance: Scottish
- UK Parliament: Na h-Eileanan an Iar
- Scottish Parliament: Na h-Eileanan an Iar

Tolsta Chaolais (also Tolastadh Chaolais, Tolstadh a' Chaolais) is a village on the Isle of Lewis, Scotland. It consists of about forty houses, clustered around Loch a' Bhaile, about 1 mile (1.5 kilometres) from the A858 road between Callanish and Carloway. The name has a Norse element, Tolsta, combined with a Gaelic element, Caolas, and means "Farm by the Strait". Tolsta Chaolais is in the parish of Uig, and has a building as a place of worship for all denominations, which is the oldest civic building in the Parish of Uig.

In 1979 the village was photographed by Fay Godwin as part of a landscape photography project funded by the Arts Council of Great Britain. One of Godwin's photographs of Tolsta Chaolais was published in her 1985 book of rural landscapes, Land.

In 2013, the village was the location of much of the filming for the CBeebies children's television programme Katie Morag.
