= Shirley Henderson =

Scottish actress (born 1965)

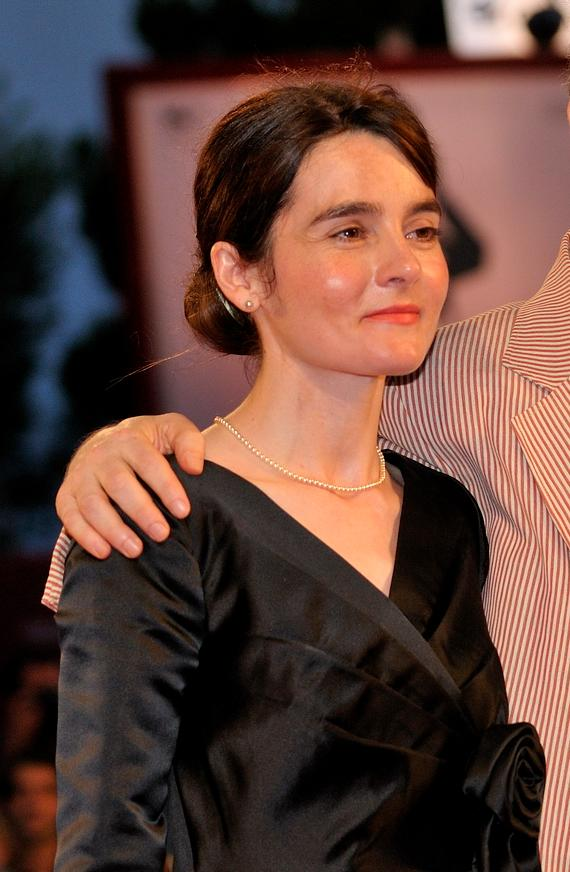
- Henderson in 2009
- Born: 24 November 1965 (age 60); Forres, Moray, Scotland
- Education: Adam Smith College; Guildhall School of Music and Drama
- Occupation: Actress
- Years active: 1986–present

Shirley Ann Henderson (born 24 November 1965) is a Scottish actress. Henderson's film roles include Gail in Trainspotting (1996) and its 2017 sequel, Jude in the Bridget Jones films (2001–2025), and Moaning Myrtle in Harry Potter and the Chamber of Secrets (2002) and Harry Potter and the Goblet of Fire (2005). Her other notable credits include Wilbur Wants to Kill Himself (2002), Intermission (2003), American Cousins (2003), Frozen (2005), Marie Antoinette (2006), Wild Child (2008), Anna Karenina (2012), Filth (2013), and Stan & Ollie (2018).

Henderson starred as Isobel Sutherland in the BBC series Hamish Macbeth (1995–97) and played Frances Drummond in the BBC drama Happy Valley (2016). She was in the BBC miniseries The Way We Live Now (2001), the ITV television film Dirty Filthy Love (2004), and played Claire Salter in the Channel 4 miniseries Southcliffe (2013).

She won the 2018 Olivier Award for Best Actress in a Musical for her role as Elizabeth in the original Old Vic production of Girl from the North Country. Her other accolades include two Scottish BAFTA Awards and a VFCC Award, along with BAFTA Award, BIFA Award, London Critics' Circle Award, Chlotrudis Award, Gotham Award, RTS Award, and Canadian Screen Award nominations.

== Early life and education ==
Henderson was born in November 1965 in Forres, Moray, and grew up in Kincardine-on-Forth, on the north shore of the Firth of Forth, in Fife. She attended Dunfermline High School. As a child, she began singing in local clubs, at charity events, holiday camps, and even a boxing contest.

At age 16, Henderson completed a one-year course at Adam Smith College, and at 17, she spent three years at the Guildhall School of Music and Drama in London, graduating in 1986.

== Career ==
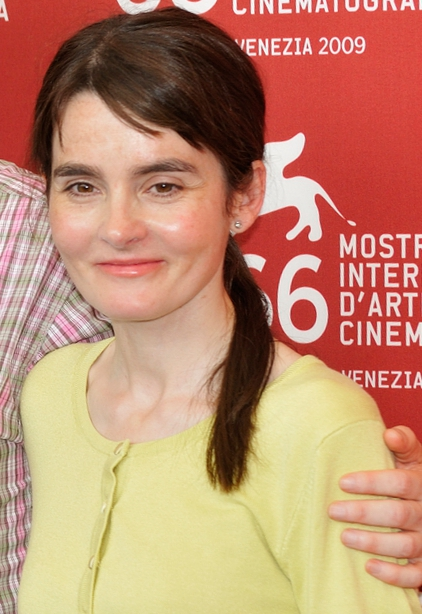
Henderson in 2009

Henderson's first television performance was in the leading role of Elizabeth Findlay in the 1987 ITV children's television drama Shadow of the Stone, for which she was cast by Leonard White. Having appeared in theatrical productions in Scotland in 1986 and 1987, she was directed by Peter Hall at the Royal National Theatre as Fanny Lock in Entertaining Strangers from October 1987 to March 1988, and as Perdita in The Winter's Tale from April to November 1988.

In 1990, she played the title role in Eurydice at the Chichester Festival, and also appeared on television in Wish Me Luck and Casualty. She landed the key role of Isobel in the popular BBC series Hamish Macbeth in 1995.

Henderson then moved into films, playing Morag in Rob Roy (1995) and Spud's girlfriend Gail in Danny Boyle's Trainspotting (1996). She continued her work in the theatre, including many productions at the Repertory Theatre in Scotland, the National Theatre, and the Royal Court Theatre in London. The next year, she appeared in Mike Leigh's Topsy-Turvy, in which she demonstrated her singing skills, and Michael Winterbottom's Wonderland.

Henderson played Jude in four Bridget Jones films and Moaning Myrtle in Harry Potter and the Chamber of Secrets (2002) and Harry Potter and the Goblet of Fire (2005). She co-starred in the British film Close Your Eyes (2002) along with Goran Višnjić and Miranda Otto and played French princess Sophie-Philippine in Sofia Coppola's Marie Antoinette (2006).

She played the school matron in Nick Moore's 2008 film Wild Child.

Small-screen appearances have included playing Marie Melmotte in The Way We Live Now (2001); Catherine of Braganza in Charles II: The Power and The Passion (2003); Charlotte in Dirty Filthy Love (2004); Ursula Blake in the Doctor Who episode "Love & Monsters" (2006); Emmeline Fox in The Crimson Petal and the White (2011); DS Angela Young in Death in Paradise (2011); and Meg Hawkins in Treasure Island (2012). She played Karen, the lead role, opposite John Simm in Channel 4's Everyday and Meme Kartosov in Anna Karenina.

In 2022, HBO Max announced that Henderson would star in Dune: Prophecy as Tula Harkonnen. However, in early 2023, director Johan Renck and Henderson were reported to have exited the production due to a "creative shift" and production delays.

In 2023 Henderson was awarded an Outstanding Contribution by BAFTA Scotland for her contribution to Scottish Film and TV.

Henderson appeared as Heather in I Swear in 2025.

== Filmography ==
=== Film ===
Key
†	Denotes films that have not yet been released

Year	Title	Role	Notes	Ref
1992	Salt on Our Skin	Mary		
1995	Rob Roy	Morag		
1996	Trainspotting	Gail		
1998	Speak Like a Child	Woman in Dream	Uncredited	
1999	Topsy-Turvy	Leonora Braham	Nominated – London Film Critics Circle Award for British Supporting Actress of the Year	
1999	Wonderland	Debbie Phillips		
2000	The Claim	Annie		
2001	Bridget Jones's Diary	Jude		
2002	The Girl in the Red Dress	Gaynor		
2002	Harry Potter and the Chamber of Secrets	Moaning Myrtle		
2002	Doctor Sleep	Detective Janet Losey		
2002	Once Upon a Time in the Midlands	Shirley		
2002	24 Hour Party People	Lindsay Wilson	Nominated – London Film Critics Circle Award for British Supporting Actress of the Year	
2002	Wilbur Wants to Kill Himself	Alice	Nominated – British Independent Film Award for Best Supporting Actor/Actress	
2002	Villa des Roses	Ella	Nominated – British Independent Film Award for Best Actress	
2003	American Cousins	Alice		
2003	Intermission	Sally		
2003	Fishy	Glenda Sands		
2003	AfterLife	Ruby		
2004	Yes	Cleaner		
2004	Bridget Jones: The Edge of Reason	Jude		
2005	A Cock and Bull Story	Susannah/Shirley Henderson	aka Tristram Shandy: A Cock and Bull Story	
2005	The Girl in the Red Dress	Gaynor	Short	
2005	Frozen	Kath Swarbrick	BAFTA Scotland Award for Best Actress in a Scottish Film; Marrakech International Film Festival: Best Actress	
2005	Harry Potter and the Goblet of Fire	Moaning Myrtle		
2006	Marie Antoinette	Aunt Sophie		
2006	Ma Boy	Ali		
2007	I Really Hate My Job	Alice		
2008	Wild Child	Matron		
2008	Miss Pettigrew Lives for a Day	Edythe DuBarry		
2009	Life During Wartime	Joy Jordan	Nominated – Gotham Independent Film Award for Best Ensemble Cast	
2010	Meek's Cutoff	Glory White		
2010	The Nutcracker in 3D	The Nutcracker	Voice	
2011	A Portentous Death	Ros		
2012	Everyday	Karen Feguson		
2012	Anna Karenina	Opera housewife		
2013	The Look of Love	Rusty Humphries		
2013	In Secret	Suzanne		
2013	Filth	Bunty Blades	Nominated – British Independent Film Award for Best Supporting Actor/Actress	
2015	Tale of Tales	Imma		
2015	Urban Hymn	Kate Linton		
2016	Bridget Jones's Baby	Jude		
2017	T2 Trainspotting	Gail		
2017	Okja	Jennifer		
2017	Never Steady, Never Still	Judy	Nominated – Canadian Screen Award for Best Actress	
2018	Stan & Ollie	Lucille Hardy		
2019	Greed	Margaret		
2019	Star Wars: The Rise of Skywalker	Babu Frik	Voice	
2022	See How They Run	Agatha Christie		
2023	The Trouble with Jessica	Sarah		
2025	Bridget Jones: Mad About the Boy	Jude		
2025	Elio	OOOOO	Voice	
2025	I Swear	Heather Davidson		
2025	Glenrothan	Jess		
2026	The Mandalorian and Grogu	Anzellans	Voice	
TBA	Love Is Not the Answer †			

=== Television ===
Year	Title	Role	Notes	Ref
1987	Shadow of the Stone	Elizabeth Findlay	6 episodes	
1990	Wish Me Luck	Sylvie	5 episodes	
1990	Casualty	Denise	1 episode	
1991	Dreaming	Pauline	TV movie	
1991	Clarissa	Sally	3 episodes	
1991	The Advocates	Andrea	3 episodes	
1994	The Bill	Kelly Rogers	1 episode	
1995	Lloyds Bank Film Challenge: You Know My Story	Diane		
1995–1997	Hamish Macbeth	Isobel Sutherland	20 episodes	
1997	Bumping the Odds	Lynette	TV movie	
2000	Animated Tales of the World: The Green Man of Knowledge		Voice	
2001	The Way We Live Now	Marie Melmotte	4 episodes Nominated – Royal Television Society Award for Best Actor – Female	
2001	In a Land of Plenty	Anne Marie	10 episodes	
2003	Charles II: The Power and The Passion	Catherine of Braganza	4 episodes	
2004	Dirty Filthy Love	Charlotte	TV movie Nominated – Royal Television Society Award for Best Actor – Female	
2005	ShakespeaRe-Told	Katherine Minola	The Taming of the Shrew	
2005	E=Mc2 (also known as Einstein's Big Idea)	Mileva Maric	1 episode	
2006	Doctor Who	Ursula Blake	Episode: "Love & Monsters"	
2007	Wedding Belles	Kelly	TV movie	
2008	Agatha Christie's Marple: Murder Is Easy	Honoria Waynflete		
2009	May Contain Nuts	Alice Chaplin	2 episodes	
2011	The Crimson Petal and the White	Emmeline Fox	3 episodes	
2011	Death in Paradise	DS Angela Young	Episode: "An Unhelpful Aid"	
2011	The Gruffalo's Child	The Gruffalo's Child	Voice	
2012	Treasure Island	Meg Hawkins	TV movie	
2013	Southcliffe	Claire Salter	Nominated – BAFTA TV Award for Best Supporting Actress	
2013	Bob Servant	Kirsty		
2014	Jamaica Inn	Hannah		
2016	Happy Valley	Frances Drummond	Series 2	
2018	The ABC Murders	Rose Marbury	3 part TV series	
2020	The Nest	Siobhan	5 part TV series	
2020	Worzel Gummidge	Saucy Nancy		
2021	Harry Potter: Hogwarts Tournament of Houses	Herself	Special appearance	
2021	Summer Camp Island	Susie's Mom	Voice	
2022	The House Across The Street	Claudia		
2023	The Mandalorian	Anzellan Crew	Voice, 4 episodes	
2023	Tom Jones	Aunt Western		
2023	Hilda	Fairy Entity	Voice, 1 episode	
2024	Kiff	Roo	Voice, 1 episode	
2025	Summerwater	Annie	Main cast	
2025	Dept. Q	Claire Marsh	Main cast	

=== Theatre ===
Dates	Title	Role	Venue	Notes	Ref.
10 October–November 1986	The Grand Edinburgh Fire Balloon		Royal Lyceum Theatre, Edinburgh		
December 1986–January 1987	A Wildcat Christmas Carol	Tiny Tim	Kilmarnock		
1987	The Gorbals Story	Maggie		play by Robert McLeish	
April 1987	The Threepenny Opera	Lucy Brown	Dundee Repertory Theatre		
9 October 1987–26 March 1988	Entertaining Strangers	Fanny Lock	Royal National Theatre, London	director: Peter Hall	
28 April–24 November 1988	The Winter's Tale	Perdita	Royal National Theatre, London	director: Peter Hall	
March 1989	My Mother Said I Never Should	Rosie	Royal Court Theatre, London	author: Charlotte Keatley, director: Michael Attenborough	
7 June–28 July 1990	Eurydice	Eurydice	Festival Theatre, Chichester	director: Michael Rudman	
1 August–5 September 1992	The Life of Stuff	Evelyn	Traverse Theatre, Edinburgh	director: John Mitchell	
Opened 19 April 1993	Lion in the Streets	Isobel	Hampstead Theatre, London	author: Judith Thompson, director: Matthew Lloyd	
8–30 October 1993	Romeo and Juliet	Juliet	Citizens Theatre, Glasgow	director: Giles Havergal	
23 March–2 April 1994	The Mill on the Floss	Maggie Tulliver	New Wolsey Theatre, Ipswich (followed by tour)	author: George Eliot, directors: Nancy Meckler, Polly Teale	
27 April–20 May 1995	The Maiden Stone	Mary	Hampstead Theatre, London	author: Rosa Munro, director: Matthew Lloyd	
10–20 September 1997	The House of Bernarda Alba	Stuart Davids	The Tramway, Glasgow	author: Federico García Lorca, director: Stuart Davids	
9 November–10 December 1997	Shining Souls	Mandy	Old Vic, London		
22 November−18 December 1999	Anna Weiss	Lynn	Whitehall Theatre, London	author: Mike Cullen, director Michael Attenborough	
8 July−7 October 2017	Girl from the North Country	Elizabeth Laine	Old Vic, London	director: Conor McPherson; Laurence Olivier Award for Best Actress in a Musical	
30 December 2017–24 March 2018	Girl from the North Country	Elizabeth Laine	Noël Coward Theatre, London	director: Conor McPherson	

== Awards and nominations ==
Year	Award	Category	Work	Result
2001	London Critics Circle Film Awards	Supporting Actress of the Year	Topsy-Turvy	Nominated
2002	British Independent Film Awards	Best Supporting Actor/Actress	Villa des Roses	Nominated
2002	RTS Television Awards	Best Actress	The Way We Live Now	Nominated
2003	Mademoiselle Ladubay Awards	Short Film	The Girl in the Red Dress	Won
2003	London Critics Circle Film Awards	Supporting Actress of the Year	24 Hour Party People	Nominated
2003	Golden Wave Awards	Best Actress	Wilbur Wants to Kill Himself	Won
2003	British Independent Film Awards	Best Supporting Actor/Actress	Wilbur Wants to Kill Himself	Nominated
2003	Cherbourg-Octeville Festival of Irish & British Film	Best Actress	American Cousins	Won
2004	London Critics Circle Film Awards	Supporting Actress of the Year	Intermission	Nominated
2004	Newport Beach Film Festival Jury Awards	Best Actress in a Feature Film (Comedy)	American Cousins	Won
2004	Bowmore Scottish Screen Awards	Actress of the Year	American Cousins	Won
2005	BAFTA Scotland Awards	Best Actress in a Scottish Film	Frozen	Won
2005	Chlotrudis Awards	Best Supporting Actress	Wilbur Wants to Kill Himself	Nominated
2005	Créteil International Women's Film Festival	Special Mention for Acting	Frozen	Won
2005	Marrakech International Film Festival Awards	Best Actress	Frozen	Won
2005	Angel Film Awards	Best Ensemble Cast (with Danny Nucci, Dan Hedaya, Gerald Lepkowski & Vincent Pastore)	American Cousins	Won
2005	RTS Television Awards	Best Actress	Dirty Filthy Love	Nominated
2006	Cherbourg-Octeville Festival of Irish & British Film	Best Actress	Frozen	Won
2010	Gotham Awards	Best Ensemble Performance (with Ciarán Hinds, Allison Janney, Michael Lerner, Chris Marquette, Rich Pecci, Charlotte Rampling, Paul Reubens, Ally Sheedy, Dylan Riley Snyder, Renée Taylor & Michael K. Williams)	Life During Wartime	Nominated
2013	British Independent Film Awards	Best Supporting Actress	Filth	Nominated
2013	SPIFF Awards	Best Actress	Everyday	Won
2014	BAFTA Television Awards	Best Supporting Actress	Southcliffe	Nominated
2014	BAFTA Scotland Awards	Best Actress – Television	Southcliffe	Won
2017	VFCC Awards	Best Actress in a Canadian Film	Never Steady, Never Still	Won
2018	Canadian Screen Awards	Best Actress in a Leading Role	Never Steady, Never Still	Nominated
2018	Laurence Olivier Awards	Best Actress in a Musical	Girl from the North Country	Won
2019	BAFTA Scotland Awards	Best Actress – Film	Stan & Ollie	Nominated
2020	LEJA Awards	Best Voice or Motion Capture Performance	Star Wars: The Rise of Skywalker	Nominated
2023	BAFTA Scotland Awards	BAFTA Scotland Outstanding Contribution		Won
