= British Academy Scotland Awards =

BAFTA Scotland annual awards ceremony

- Awarded for: To recognise, honour, and reward outstanding work produced in Scotland.
- Country: United Kingdom (Scotland)
- First award: 2004
- Website: Bafta Scotland Awards

The British Academy Scotland Awards are presented annually at an awards ceremony organised by BAFTA Scotland.

== History ==
The annual British Academy Scotland Awards were launched in 2004 to recognise outstanding achievement by individuals working in the Film and Television industry in Scotland. A long list of potential nominees is put to a popular vote of BAFTA Scotland members. A jury of industry professionals vote for the overall winner from the short list created by the members. A members of the BAFTA Scotland Committee will chair each of the juries.

The awards were cancelled in 2010 and prizes at the 2011 ceremony given for films released over the previous 2 years.

Over the years the annual event has taken place at various locations including the Glasgow City Halls and the Glasgow Science centre. From 2011 to 2018 the event was held at the Radisson Blu Hotel in Glasgow. As of 2019, the ceremony has been hosted at the Doubletree by Hilton Glasgow Central.

In 2015, the British Academy Scotland Award trophy was redesigned by Scottish designer Oliver J. Conway who was an apprentice of the original trophy designer, Allan Ross.

== Hosts ==
- Lorraine Kelly (2007, 2009)
- Edith Bowman (2008, 2012, 2013, 2015–present)
- Kevin Bridges (2011)
- Hazel Irvine (2014)

== Awards categories (competitive) ==
Categories as of 2016.

- ACTOR FILM
- ACTOR TELEVISION
- ACTRESS FILM
- ACTRESS TELEVISION
- ANIMATION
- CHILDREN'S PROGRAMME
- COMEDY/ENTERTAINMENT
- CURRENT AFFAIRS
- DIRECTOR FILM/TELEVISION
- FACTUAL SERIES
- FEATURE FILM
- FEATURES/FACTUAL ENTERTAINMENT
- GAME
- SHORT FILM
- SINGLE DOCUMENTARY
- SPECIALIST FACTUAL
- TELEVISION DRAMA
- WRITER FILM/TELEVISION

== Outstanding Contribution to Film/Television ==
Every year, a special award is presented to an individual in recognition of their contribution to Scottish Film and/or Television.

Year	Recipient		Notes	Ref(s)
2004	Brian Cox, 2004	Brian Cox (actor)	Actor	
2009	Bill Forsyth, 2009	Bill Forsyth	Director, Screenwriter	
2011	Coltrane in April 2007	Robbie Coltrane	Actor, Author	
2012	Connolly in June 2012	Billy Connolly	Actor, Comedian	
2013	Wilson in 2007	Richard Wilson	Actor	
2014	Lorraine Kelly attending an event in 2007	Lorraine Kelly	Television presenter, Journalist	
2015	Paterson in 2006	Bill Paterson	Actor	
2016	Ken Loach	Ken Loach	Film and television director (Awarded to the founders of Sixteen Films)	
2016		Rebecca O'Brien	Producer, Production Manager (Awarded to the founders of Sixteen Films)	
2016	Paul Laverty at the 61st Berlin International Film Festival on 15 February 2011	Paul Laverty	Screenwriter (Awarded to the founders of Sixteen Films)	
2017	Armando Iannucci	Armando Iannucci	Writer	
2018	Alan Cumming	Alan Cumming	Actor, singer, director, producer, writer, activist	
2019		Greg Hemphill, Ford Kiernan and Michael Hines	Creative team behind Still Game	
2020		Stanley Baxter	Actor, comedian, impressionist, author	
2021		None	No Award Given	
2022	Peter Capaldi	Peter Capaldi	Actor, Director, Writer	
2023	Shirley Henderson	Shirley Henderson and Stuart Wilson	Actress, Sound Engineer	

== See also ==
- British Academy of Film and Television Arts
