= London Film Critics' Circle Award for British Actor of the Year =

Former British film award

The London Film Critics Circle Award for British/Irish Actor of the Year was an annual award given by the London Film Critics Circle.

== Winners ==
=== 1990s ===
Year	Winner	Film	Role
1991	Alan Rickman	Close My Eyes, Truly, Madly, Deeply, Quigley Down Under, and Robin Hood: Prince of Thieves	Sinclair Bryant, Jamie, Elliot Marston, and Sheriff of Nottingham
1992	Daniel Day-Lewis	The Last of the Mohicans	Nathaniel "Hawkeye" Poe
1993	David Thewlis	Naked	Johnny
1994	Ralph Fiennes	Schindler's List	Amon Goeth
1995	Nigel Hawthorne	The Madness of King George	King George III
1996	Ewan McGregor	Trainspotting, Brassed Off, Emma, and The Pillow Book	Mark Renton, Andy Barrow, Frank Churchill, and Jerome
1996	Ian McKellen	Richard III	Richard, Duke of Gloucester (King Richard III)
1997	Robert Carlyle	The Full Monty, Face, and Carla's Song	Gary “Gaz” Schofield, Ray, and George Lennox
1998	Brendan Gleeson	The General	Martin Cahill
1999	Jeremy Northam	Happy, Texas, An Ideal Husband, and The Winslow Boy	Harry Sawyer, Sir Robert Chiltern, and Sir Robert Morton

=== 2000s ===
Year	Winner	Film	Role
2000	Jim Broadbent	Topsy-Turvy	W. S. Gilbert
2001	Ewan McGregor	Moulin Rouge!	Christian
2002	Hugh Grant	About a Boy	Will Freeman
2003	Paul Bettany	Master and Commander: The Far Side of the World	Dr. Stephen Maturin
2004	Daniel Craig	Enduring Love	Joe Rose
2005	Ralph Fiennes	The Constant Gardener	Justin Quayle
2006	Toby Jones	Infamous	Truman Capote
2007	James McAvoy	Atonement	Robbie Turner
2008	Michael Fassbender	Hunger	Bobby Sands
2009	Colin Firth	A Single Man	George Falconer

=== 2010s ===
Year	Winner	Film	Role
2010	Christian Bale	The Fighter	Dick “Dicky” Eklund
2011	Michael Fassbender	A Dangerous Method and Shame	Carl Jung and Brandon Sullivan
2012	Toby Jones	Berberian Sound Studio	Gilderoy
2013	James McAvoy	Filth, Trance, and Welcome to the Punch	Bruce Robertson, Simon Newton, and Max Lewinsky
2014	Timothy Spall	Mr. Turner	J. M. W. Turner
2015	Tom Hardy	Legend, London Road, Mad Max: Fury Road, and The Revenant	Ronnie Kray and Reggie Kray, Mark, Max Rockatansky, and John Fitzgerald
2016	Andrew Garfield	Hacksaw Ridge and Silence	Desmond T. Doss and Father Sebastião Rodrigues
2017	Daniel Kaluuya	Get Out	Chris Washington
2018	Rupert Everett	The Happy Prince	Oscar Wilde
2019	Robert Pattinson	High Life, The King and The Lighthouse	Monte, The Dauphin and Ephraim Winslow

=== 2020s ===
Year	Winner	Film	Role
2020	Riz Ahmed	Mogul Mowgli and Sound of Metal	Zed and Ruben Stone
2021	Andrew Garfield	The Eyes of Tammy Faye, Mainstream, Spider-Man: No Way Home and Tick, Tick... Boom!	Jim Bakker, Link, Peter Parker/Spider-Man and Jonathan Larson
2022	Bill Nighy	Living	Mr. Rodney Williams
