= London Film Critics Circle Awards 1999 =

British film awards ceremony

20th London Film Critics Circle Awards

2 March 2000

Film of the Year:
American Beauty

British Film of the Year:
East Is East

The 20th London Film Critics Circle Awards, honouring the best in film for 1999, were announced by the London Film Critics Circle on 2 March 2000.

== Winners ==
Film of the Year

- American Beauty

British Film of the Year

- East Is East

Foreign Language Film of the Year

- All About My Mother • Spain

Director of the Year

- Sam Mendes – American Beauty

British Director of the Year

- Lynne Ramsay – Ratcatcher

Screenwriter of the Year

- Alan Ball – American Beauty

British Screenwriter of the Year

- Ayub Khan-Din – East Is East

Actor of the Year

- Kevin Spacey – American Beauty

Actress of the Year

- Annette Bening – American Beauty

British Actor of the Year

- Jeremy Northam – Happy, Texas, An Ideal Husband, The Winslow Boy

British Actress of the Year

- Emily Watson – Angela's Ashes and Hilary and Jackie

British Supporting Actor of the Year

- Michael Caine – Little Voice

British Supporting Actress of the Year

- Lynn Redgrave – Gods and Monsters

British Newcomer of the Year

- Martha Fiennes – Onegin

British Producer of the Year

- Leslee Udwin – East Is East

Dilys Powell Award

- Mike Leigh
