= Outcast (Paver novel) =

Children's book by Michelle Paver

- First edition
- Author: Michelle Paver
- Illustrator: Geoff Taylor
- Cover artist: John Fordham
- Language: English
- Series: Chronicles of Ancient Darkness
- Genre: Children's adventure, fantasy novel
- Publisher: 2007 Orion Children's Books
- Publication place: United Kingdom
- Media type: Print (hardback & paperback), audio book (CD & cassette)
- Pages: 356 (paperback)
- ISBN: 1-84255-170-1 (first edition, hardback)
- OCLC: 145935498
- Preceded by: Soul Eater
- Followed by: Oath Breaker

Outcast is a 2007 children's fantasy adventure novel written by Michelle Paver and illustrated by Geoff Taylor. It is the fourth book in the Chronicles of Ancient Darkness. It is preceded by Wolf Brother (2004), Spirit Walker (2005), and Soul Eater (2006), and followed by Oath Breaker (2008), Ghost Hunter (2009), Viper's Daughter (2020), Skin Taker (2021), and Wolfbane (2022).

== Plot summary ==
It is revealed that in the previous book, the Soul Eaters marked Torak with the Soul Eater symbol. When the symbol is noticed on a hunt by another boy named Aki, the decision is made to banish him from the clans; furthermore, the leader of the Wolf Clan, that of Torak's father, announces that his mother named him 'clanless'. This is unprecedented, but as Torak has no clan(guardian) to defend his innocence, he becomes an outcast. He leaves the clans with Wolf. His friends Renn and Bale relentlessly try to help him, but Torak refuses, only caring for their safety, as the punishment for helping a Soul eater is death.

Concluding that an attempt to cut out the Soul Eater mark from his chest has worked, he returns to the Raven Camp. However Saeunn, the Raven Clan's mage, feels the presence of a Soul Eater, and Torak flees. While in hiding, he suffers from a kind of madness called soul sickness, and attacks Wolf with fire. Meanwhile, Renn and Bale decide to find Torak and prove his innocence, even though in doing so they are breaking the law of the clans. Renn sends help to Torak in the form of two ravens (named Rip and Rek by Torak). While Torak is recovering, Seshru the Viper Mage, a Soul Eater, uses her powers to draw him to her to control his spirit-walking powers. Seshru is revealed to be Renn's mother, and is in possession of a fragment of the fire opal, a mystical artifact which controls demons, and which can only be destroyed through a sacrifice of a life

Renn realises that a giant flood is coming and encourages Torak to spread the word, which would prove his good intentions. Torak tells Fin-Kedinn, the leader of the Raven Clan and the clans flee. Torak is swept away by the water along with Wolf after he helps Aki climb a tree, and passes out on a bank. When he wakes up, Fin-Kedinn prevents the other clans from killing Torak by adopting him as his son; the appearance of Seshru convinces everyone that Torak is innocent. Bale uses Renn's bow to kill Seshru, and she dies holding the fire opal, destroying its power. Later, Torak, Renn, Bale and Fin-Kedinn deduce that there is only one fragment of the fire opal left somewhere in the forest, which Thiazzi and Eostra, the remaining Soul Eaters, are both seeking.

== Reception ==
Kirkus Reviews provided less praise for Outcast than for previous novels in the series, noting that "the plot’s most dramatic elements [...] take a back seat to character development". They explained, "Much of the journey and ensuing confrontation [...] seems distant, filtered through Torak’s sharply felt inner turmoil". They further discussed how "the vividly interwoven natural and spiritual settings that have distinguished this series emerge in long stretches seen from the point-of-view of Wolf".

Booklist also reviewed the novel.
