= Jeremy Northam =

British actor (born 1961)

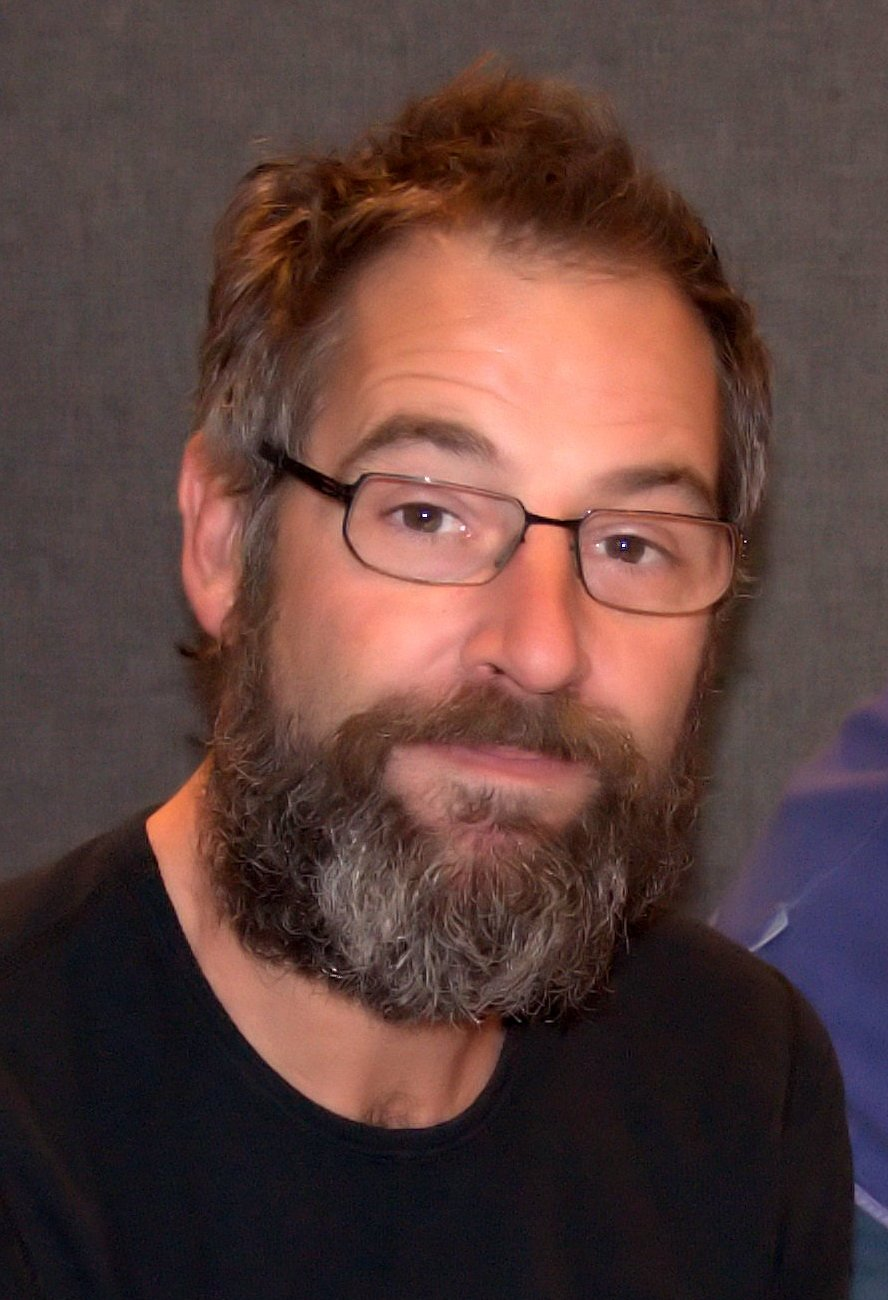
- Northam in 2010
- Born: Jeremy Philip Northam; 1 December 1961 (age 64); Cambridge, Cambridgeshire, England
- Education: Bedford College, London (B.A., 1984); Bristol Old Vic Theatre School
- Occupation: Actor
- Years active: 1987–present
- Spouse: Liz Moro (m. 2005; div. 2009?)
- Parent(s): John Northam; Rachel Howard

Jeremy Philip Northam (born 1 December 1961) is an English actor. His film credits include The Net (1995), Emma (1996), An Ideal Husband (1999), Amistad (1997), The Winslow Boy (1999), Gosford Park (2001) and Enigma (2001). In television, he also played Thomas More in the Showtime series The Tudors (2007–2008) and appeared as Anthony Eden in the Netflix series The Crown (2016–2017).

== Early life and education ==
Northam was born on 1 December 1961, in Cambridge, Cambridgeshire. His father was John Northam, a professor of literature and theatre. Northam studied English at Bedford College, London (B.A. English, 1984) and acting at the Bristol Old Vic Theatre School. He is an alumnus of the Royal Holloway, University of London.

== Career ==
=== Screen and stage ===
Northam made his screen debut on television in the series American Playhouse, as Mr. Benson in the episode "Suspicion". He followed with appearances in ITV's Wish Me Luck (1987) and Piece of Cake (1988).

Northam performed at the Royal National Theatre – he replaced both Ian Charleson and Daniel Day-Lewis in the role of Hamlet (1989), when they had to withdraw, and won the 1990 Laurence Olivier Award for Best Newcomer in a Play for his performance in The Voysey Inheritance.

He has appeared frequently in British films such as Carrington (1995), Emma (1996), The Winslow Boy (1999), An Ideal Husband (1999), Enigma (2001), and as Welsh actor and singer Ivor Novello in Gosford Park (2001). He made his American film debut in The Net (1995) and also starred in Guillermo del Toro's English-language directorial debut Mimic (1997).

In 2002, he starred in the film Cypher. That same year, he portrayed singer Dean Martin in the CBS film Martin and Lewis and golfer Walter Hagen in Bobby Jones: Stroke of Genius in 2004. In 2007 and 2008, he portrayed Thomas More on the Showtime series, The Tudors.

He played John Brodie Innes in the 2009 film Creation, based on the life of Charles Darwin. In the 2015 film The Man Who Knew Infinity, he portrayed the philosopher Bertrand Russell. He played British Prime Minister Anthony Eden in the 2016 Netflix drama series The Crown.

=== Other work ===
His audiobook work includes The Silver Chair (The Chronicles of Narnia, Book 6) by C. S. Lewis, The Real Thing and Other Short Stories and The Aspern Papers, both written by Henry James. In 2007 he recorded "The Great Poets" by Gerard Manley Hopkins, In 2009, he recorded Our Man in Havana by Graham Greene, in 2010, Dark Matter, a ghost story by Michelle Paver, In 2010, Down and Out in Paris and London and in 2012, The Road to Wigan Pier, both by George Orwell.

In the Gosford Park soundtrack, Northam sings the Ivor Novello songs "And Her Mother Came Too", "What a Duke Should Be", "Why Isn't It You", "I Can Give You the Starlight", and "The Land of Might Have Been", accompanied by his brother Christopher on piano.

== Personal life ==
Northam married Canadian film and television make-up artist Liz Moro in April 2005; they later divorced.

== Acting credits ==
=== Film and television ===
Year	Film	Role	Notes
1988	American Playhouse	Mr. Benson	TV series (1 episode: Suspicion)
1988	Wish Me Luck	Colin Beale	TV series (14 episodes: 1988–1989)
1988	Piece of Cake	'Fitz' Fitzgerald	TV mini-series (5 episodes)
1988	Journey's End	Captain Stanhope	TV film
1992	House of Glass	Gerald Stafford	TV film
1992	A Fatal Inversion	Rufus Fletcher	TV series (3 episodes)
1992	Wuthering Heights	Hindley Earnshaw	
1993	Soft Top Hard Shoulder	John	
1993	Agatha Christie's Poirot	Hugo Trent	TV series (1 episode: "Dead Man's Mirror")
1995	A Village Affair	Anthony Jordan	TV film
1995	Carrington	Beacus Penrose	
1995	The Net	Jack Devlin	Film
1995	Voices	Philip Heseltine/Peter Warlock	
1996	Emma	Mr. Knightley	
1997	Mimic	Dr. Peter Mann	
1997	Amistad	Judge Coglin	
1998	The Tribe	Jamie	
1998	The Misadventures of Margaret	Edward Nathan	
1999	Happy, Texas	Harry Sawyer, aka Steven "Steve"	ALFS Award for British Actor of the Year
1999	Gloria	Kevin	
1999	An Ideal Husband	Sir Robert Chiltern	Evening Standard British Film Award for Best Actor; ALFS Award for British Actor of the Year
1999	The Winslow Boy	Sir Robert Morton	Edinburgh International Film Festival Award for Best British Performance; ALFS Award for British Actor of the Year; Evening Standard British Film Award for Best Actor
2000	The Golden Bowl	Prince Amerigo	
2001	Enigma	Mr. Wigram	
2001	Gosford Park	Ivor Novello	See TALK for Ensemble awards
2002	Possession	Randolph Henry Ash	
2002	Cypher	Morgan Sullivan/Jack Thursby/Sebastian Rooks	International Fantasy Film Award for Best Actor; Catalan International Film Award for Best Actor
2002	Martin and Lewis	Dean Martin	TV film
2003	The Singing Detective	Mark Binney	
2003	The Statement	Colonel Roux	
2004	Bobby Jones: Stroke of Genius	Walter Hagen	
2005	Guy X	Col. Woolwrap	
2005	A Cock and Bull Story	Mark	
2006	The Payback	Vladimir	
2007	The Invasion	Tucker Kauffman	
2007–2008	The Tudors	Sir Thomas More	TV series (15 episodes)
2008	Fiona's Story	Simon	TV film
2008	Dean Spanley	Fisk Junior	
2009	Creation	Reverend Innes	
2009	Glorious 39	Joseph Balcombe	
2010	Miami Medical	Dr. Matthew Proctor	TV series (13 episodes)
2012	White Heat	Edward	TV series (6 episodes)
2014	New Worlds	Charles II	TV series (4 episodes)
2015	Eye in the Sky	Brian Woodale	
2015	The Man Who Knew Infinity	Bertrand Russell	
2016	Our Kind of Traitor	Aubrey Longrigg	
2016–2017	The Crown	Anthony Eden	Main role (11 episodes: Seasons 1–2)
2019	Official Secrets	Ken Macdonald	
2023	Freud's Last Session	Ernest Jones	

=== Theatre ===
- Edward Voysey, The Voysey Inheritance, National Theatre Company, Cottesloe Theatre, London, 1989.
- School for Scandal, Bristol Old Vic, 1990.
- Osric, then later title role, Hamlet, National Theatre Company, Olivier Theatre, London, 1989.
- The Three Sisters, Sondheim Theatre, 1990–1991.
- The Way of the World, Lyric Theatre (Hammersmith), 1992.
- Philip, The Gift of the Gorgon, Royal Shakespeare Company (RSC), The Pit (theatre), London, 1992.
- Elomire, La Bête, Really Useful Theatre Company, 1993.
- Berowne, Love's Labour's Lost, RSC, Barbican Theatre, London, 1994.
- Mr. Horner, The Country Wife, RSC, Pit Theatre, 1994.
- Obstetrician, Certain Young Men, Almeida Theatre, London, 1999.
- Old Times, Donmar Warehouse Theatre, London, 2004.
- Richard Greatham, Hay Fever, Noël Coward Theatre, London, 2012.

== Awards and nominations ==
Year	Awards	Category	Nominated work	Result	Ref.
1990	Laurence Olivier Award	Best Newcomer in a Play	The Voysey Inheritance	Won	
1999	Evening Standard British Film Awards	Best Actor	An Ideal Husband and The Winslow Boy	Won	
1999	London Film Critics Circle Awards	British Actor of the Year	Happy, Texas, An Ideal Husband and The Winslow Boy	Won	
2002	Sitges Film Festival (of Catalonia)	Best Actor	Cypher	Won	
2003	International Fantasy Film Award Awards	Fantasporto - Best Actor	Cypher	Won	
