= The Winslow Boy (1948 film) =

1948 film by Anthony Asquith

- Original British poster
- Directed by: Anthony Asquith
- Written by: Terence Rattigan; Anatole de Grunwald; Anthony Asquith
- Based on: The Winslow Boy by Terence Rattigan
- Produced by: Anatole de Grunwald
- Starring: Robert Donat; Margaret Leighton; Sir Cedric Hardwicke; Basil Radford; Neil North; Jack Watling; Kathleen Harrison; Hugh Dempster
- Cinematography: Freddie Young; Osmond H. Borradaile (exteriors)
- Edited by: Gerald Turney-Smith
- Music by: William Alwyn (comp.); Dr. Hubert Clifford (dir.)
- Production company: London Films
- Distributed by: British Lion Films (UK)
- Release date: 8 November 1948 (UK)
- Running time: 117 minutes
- Country: United Kingdom
- Language: English
- Budget: £425,915
- Box office: £211,383 (UK)

The Winslow Boy is a 1948 British drama film adaptation of Terence Rattigan's 1946 play The Winslow Boy. It was made by De Grunwald Productions and distributed by the British Lion Film Corporation. It was directed by Anthony Asquith and produced by Anatole de Grunwald with Teddy Baird as associate producer. The adapted screenplay was written by de Grunwald and Rattigan based on Rattigan's play. The music score was by William Alwyn and the cinematography by Freddie Young.

The film stars Robert Donat, Sir Cedric Hardwicke and Margaret Leighton with Basil Radford, Kathleen Harrison, Francis L. Sullivan, Marie Lohr and Jack Watling (who was also in the original West End theatre production). Also in the cast are Stanley Holloway, Mona Washbourne, Ernest Thesiger, Wilfrid Hyde-White, Lewis Casson, Cyril Ritchard and Dandy Nichols. Neil North, who plays the title role, also appeared in the 1999 film adaptation directed by David Mamet.

== Plot ==
In 1912, Arthur Winslow goes home from his job at the bank after 46 years, retiring because of arthritis. He has a normal domestic life for a middle-class family: his eldest son Dickie is at Oxford University, his daughter Catherine is a non-militant suffragette, and his youngest son Ronnie is starting as cadet at the Royal Naval College. Additionally, next-door neighbour John Watherstone asks for his daughter's hand in marriage.

Ronnie appears unexpectedly back home, soaking wet. He has a letter for his father from the college which he is too scared to give him. He is accused of the theft of a postal order for five shillings. An internal inquiry, which grants him no chance of defence, finds him guilty and Arthur is requested to remove his son from the college. Unwilling to accept the verdict, Arthur and Catherine institute their own enquiries and engage friend and family solicitor Desmond Curry to assist them, including the briefing of the best barrister in England at the time, Sir Robert Morton, should the case come to court.

After aggressively interrogating Ronnie over discrepancies in his recollection and his habit of copying his friend's signature (which purportedly could have been used to steal the postal order), Morton is convinced Ronnie is innocent and agrees to take the case.

Arthur also takes the matter to his MP, who raises it at the House of Commons under the issue within Magna Carta that no subject of the country may be condemned without trial.

The government is unwilling to allow the case to proceed but yields after heated debates in the House of Commons.

When the combined lawyer's bill reaches six-hundred and thirty-four pounds, well beyond his overdraft limit, Arthur is advised to cut his losses and abandon the case. He tells the eldest son that he is taking him out of Oxford to cut his expenses and will find him a job at the bank instead.

The case comes to court and Morton is ultimately able to discredit much of the supposed evidence. The government finally withdraws the charges against Ronnie and a profuse apology is given to the family. Although the family wins the case, each of them has lost something along the way: Dickie has been forced to leave Oxford out of lack of money, but has employment with a bank in Reading; Catherine loses her marriage settlement and subsequently her fiancé John, although there is a spark between her and Morton ("How little you know men"); Arthur loses his health but regains his family honour. And Morton has turned down an appointment as Lord Chief Justice in order to prosecute the case but may have won the girl.

== Cast ==
- Robert Donat as Sir Robert Morton
- Cedric Hardwicke as Arthur Winslow
- Basil Radford as Desmond Curry
- Margaret Leighton as Catherine Winslow
- Kathleen Harrison as Violet
- Francis L. Sullivan as Attorney General
- Marie Lohr as Grace Winslow
- Jack Watling as Dickie Winslow
- Walter Fitzgerald as First Lord
- Lewis Casson as Second Sea Lord (uncredited)
- Frank Lawton as John Watherstone
- Neil North as Ronald Winslow ("Ronnie")
- Nicholas Hannen as Colonel Watherstone
- Hugh Dempster as Agricultural Member
- Evelyn Roberts as Hamilton MP
- W.A. Kelley as Brian O'Rourke
- Edward Lexy as First Elderly Member
- Gordon McLeod as Second Elderly Member
- Marie Michelle as Mrs. Curry
- Mona Washbourne as Miss Barnes
- Ivan Samson as Captain Flower
- Kynaston Reeves as Lord Chief Justice
- Charles Groves as Clerk of the Court
- Ernest Thesiger as Mr. Ridgeley Pierce
- Vera Cook as Violet's friend
- Stanley Holloway as Comedian
- Cyril Ritchard as Music Hall Singer
- Mary Hinton as Mrs. Elliott (uncredited)
- Noel Howlett as Mr. Williams (uncredited)
- Wilfrid Hyde-White as Wilkinson (uncredited)
- Dandy Nichols as Miss Hawkins (uncredited)

== Background ==
Set against the strict codes of conduct and manners of the age, The Winslow Boy is based on a father's fight to clear his son's name. The son is expelled from Osborne Naval College for supposedly stealing a five-shilling postal order, without receiving a fair trial. His father, Arthur and sister, Catherine lead a long running legal battle, that takes them as far as the House of Commons. The play focuses on a refusal to back down in the face of injustice – the entire Winslow family, and Sir Robert Morton their barrister who represents them, make great sacrifices in order that right be done.

The play was inspired by an actual event, which set a legal precedent; the case of George Archer-Shee, a cadet at Osborne in 1908, who was accused of stealing a postal order from a fellow cadet. His elder brother, Major Martin Archer-Shee, was convinced of his innocence, and persuaded his father to engage lawyers. The most respected barrister of the day, Sir Edward Carson, was also persuaded of his innocence, and insisted on the case coming to court. On the fourth day of the trial, the Solicitor General accepted that Archer-Shee was innocent, and ultimately the family was paid compensation. George Archer-Shee died in the First World War and his name is inscribed on the war memorial in the village of Woodchester in Gloucestershire, where his parents lived. There is no real-world counterpart to the character of Catherine, although she is central to the plot of the play and films.

== Differences from the play ==
Unlike the play and the David Mamet remake, the 1948 film shows the actual trial, while in other versions, the trial occurs offstage and the audience is told (but not shown) what occurred during it.

== Production ==
The film was shot in early 1948.

The Archer-Shee case took place in 1908, while the film is set in 1912–13, just prior to World War I.

== Reception ==
=== Box office ===
The Winslow Boy was one of the most popular films at the British box office in 1948. According to Kinematograph Weekly the 'biggest winner' at the box office in 1948 Britain was The Best Years of Our Lives with Spring in Park Lane being the best British film and "runners up" being It Always Rains on Sunday, My Brother Jonathan, Road to Rio, Miranda, An Ideal Husband, The Naked City, The Red Shoes, Green Dolphin Street, Forever Amber, Life with Father, The Weaker Sex, Oliver Twist, The Fallen Idol and The Winslow Boy.

As of 30 June 1949 the film earned £216,000 in the UK of which £159,034 went to the producer.

=== Awards ===
The picture was nominated for the BAFTA UN award for 1949.

=== Critical ===
Writing in The New York Times however, Bosley Crowther compared the film unfavourably to the play, "staged with superlative finish on Broadway two seasons ago," but praised the "sparkling performance" of Robert Donat, and concluded, that despite these reservations, "the screen has a striking and an inspiring picture in 'The Winslow Boy'"; The Monthly Film Bulletin noted, "It is very much a period piece, in which the middle class, with its comforts, its unlovely interiors and hideous clothes, is very much in evidence. It is too long, and would benefit by judicious cutting," although the reviewer concluded, "This is quite definitely a film to see and enjoy"; while more recently, Dennis Schwartz found the film to be "directed with great care for feeling and detail (the period settings are superb) by Anthony Asquith," and that it "proves to be excellent middle-class entertainment," and concluded by singling out Donat, "superb as the witty and elegant lawyer, who also has grit and compassion."

Among film-guide books, Leonard Maltin's Movie Guide rates it 3.5 stars (out of 4) stars, and Martin and Porter's, DVD & Video Guide rates it as 4 (out of 5) stars.
