= Oath Breaker =

Oath Breaker or Oathbreaker may refer to:

- A person who breaks an oath
- Oath Breaker (novel), a 2008 novel by Michelle Paver
- Oathbreaker (band), a Belgian heavy metal band
- "Oathbreaker" (Game of Thrones), an episode of the television series Game of Thrones
- Oathbreakers, a 1989 novel by Mercedes Lackey
