= Soul Eater (novel) =

2006 fantasy novel by Michelle Paver

- The cover of the first British edition
- Author: Michelle Paver
- Illustrator: Geoff Taylor
- Cover artist: John Fordham
- Language: English
- Series: Chronicles of Ancient Darkness
- Genre: Children's adventure, fantasy novel
- Publisher: 2006 Orion Children's Books
- Publication place: United Kingdom
- Media type: Print (hardback & paperback), audio book (CD & cassette)
- Pages: 323 (paperback)
- ISBN: 1-84255-170-1 (first edition, hardback)
- OCLC: 71329760
- Preceded by: Spirit Walker
- Followed by: Outcast

Soul Eater is the third book in the Chronicles of Ancient Darkness series written by Michelle Paver and illustrated by Geoff Taylor.

Soul Eater is preceded by Wolf Brother (2004) and Spirit Walker (2005), and followed by Outcast (2007), Oath Breaker (2008), Ghost Hunter (2009), Viper's Daughter (2020), Skin Taker (2021), and Wolfbane (2022).

== Plot summary ==
Wolf gets snagged by a grak and Renn track his captors northwards. During their journey, Torak spirit walks (Note: As depicted in Spirit Walker.) in a raven, and discovers that the Soul Eaters, a group of evil mages, have captured Wolf. They follow them to the Far North, where they encounter Inuktiluk, leader of the White Fox Clan. They go with him to the White Fox Clan's camp, where the clan's mage tells them of a vision she has had, in which Torak is about to hit Wolf with an axe. Continuing their search for Wolf, they find the cave which the Soul-Eaters now inhabit. The mages are named as: Thiazzi, the Oak Mage; Nef, the Bat Mage; Seshru, the Viper Mage; and their chief Eostra, the Eagle Owl Mage.

Torak secretly exchanges places with a boy who is serving as an apprentice to the Soul Eaters. To maintain his disguise, Torak helps the Soul Eaters in their quest to release an army of demons, while Renn also enters their cave. While inside, Torak, after learning that his father once saved the Bat Mage's life, spirit walks in a bear and finds out where Wolf is. When Torak and Renn find Wolf, who is maddened by an injury to his tail and doesn't recognise them, they are forced to use Renn's axe to cut off Wolf's tail, fulfilling the mage's vision. They free all the animals which the Soul Eaters have been holding captive, but the Soul Eaters release demons in pursuit. Renn takes the Fire Opal, a religious artifact belonging to the Soul Eaters that can control demons, but as they flee, Torak and Renn become separated when Renn floats away on a piece of sea ice. Meanwhile, Torak becomes snow blind and is captured by the Soul Eaters.

Renn eventually halts, and she realises that the Fire Opal can be destroyed by being buried under stone while a life is sacrificed. She intends to kill herself to get rid of the Fire Opal, but before she can do so, Torak and the Soul Eaters arrive. Torak spirit walks inside an ice bear and attacks the Soul Eaters. Renn is about to jump but at the last minute, the Bat Mage sacrifices herself to fulfill her debt to Torak's father. Having escaped from the three evil, remaining Soul Eaters, Torak, Renn and Wolf are rescued by Fin-Kedinn and Inuktiluk. They return to the peaceful forest together, and deduce that the fire opal which was buried with Nef was only one of three minute pieces.

== Translations ==
Soul Eater has been released in several languages including French, Dutch, Italian, Korean and Swedish.

== Reception ==
In a starred review, Kirkus Reviews claimed Soul Eater is "compelling from first page to last" and highlighted the novel's "quick pacing, vivid storytelling and strong connections between human characters and the natural world".

Several reviewers discussed the novel's pacing and suspense, with Booklist's Sally Estes calling the tension "palpable and the danger excruciating". School Library Journal's Walter Minkel discussed how "Paver describes how much labor and constant attention go into simply surviving in a world so hostile to humanity, and readers will be kept on the edge of their chairs as they follow the struggle of characters who risk their lives every day trying to accomplish a task that seems certain to lead to their death".

Estes also highlighted the novel's "mesmerizing blend of magic, convincing animal lore, and an indelibly limned environment".
