= Ghost Hunter (novel) =

2009 fantasy novel by Michelle Paver

- First edition
- Author: Michelle Paver
- Language: English
- Series: Chronicles of Ancient Darkness
- Genre: Fantasy novel
- Publisher: Orion Children's Books
- Publication date: 20 August 2009 (UK)
- Publication place: United Kingdom
- Media type: Print (Hardback & Paperback) & Audio book (CD & Cassette)
- Pages: 224 pp (first edition, hardback)
- ISBN: 1-84255-175-2 (first edition, hardback)
- Preceded by: Oath Breaker
- Followed by: Viper's Daughter

Ghost Hunter is the sixth book in the Chronicles of Ancient Darkness series written by British author Michelle Paver and illustrated by Geoff Taylor. The book was released on 20 August 2009 in the United Kingdom.

Ghost Hunter is preceded by Wolf Brother (2004), Spirit Walker (2005), Soul Eater (2006), Outcast (2007), and Oath Breaker (2008), and followed by Viper's Daughter (2020), Skin Taker (2021), and Wolfbane (2022).

== Plot summary ==
As winter approaches, Eostra, the last and most fearsome Soul-Eater, has spread a net of terror and fear across the whole Forest. Torak is plagued with visions of his father, who died three years previously. Fin-Kedinn counsels that the visions are not his father's spirit asking for help, but are instead Eostra's machinations, but Torak is unconvinced. He sets out eastwards, without Renn, to the High Mountains to confront Eostra and find his answers. He first visits the den of his companion Wolf, Wolf's mate Darkfur, and their cubs Shadow and Pebble. Renn pursues Torak, and Fin-Kedinn sets out on a journey of his own. However, an eagle owl, controlled by Eostra, attacks the wolves' den and, after killing Darkfur and Shadow, picks Pebble up and flies east, pursued by Wolf.

Torak reunites with Renn in an ice storm, and nurses a near-suicidal Wolf back to health. Meanwhile, Pebble is dropped by the owl, and having hidden from the storm, follows Torak's ravens to the High Mountains. Having realized Eostra is waiting for the winter solstice, they meet with Krukoslik of the Mountain Hare Clan, who tells them that a Soul-Eater haunts the Mountain of Ghosts. After Eostra enters the Mountain Hare camp and taunts Renn, Krukoslik guides them to the Valley of the Hidden People, where Renn encounters a huge dog controlled by the Soul-Eater. Torak argues that he must confront Eostra alone and, after admitting his affection for Renn and kissing her, sets out for her lair.

Fin-Kedinn, having found the man who was the object of his search, is forced to leave him and return to the Raven Clan. Wolf draws a pack of the dogs off Torak; he is rescued by Dark, a boy living on the Mountain, who keeps him captive. Darkfur is revealed to still live, struggling all the way to the Mountains in search of her cub. Torak convinces Dark to let him go, and he walks into the caves on the Mountain with Wolf; Renn meets with Dark, and they enter the caves too. Eostra summons the souls of the dead Soul-Eaters to her, including that of Torak's father. However, the last Soul-Eater is revealed to be the Walker - the man who Fin-Kedinn had sent to the mountain. The Walker summons the spirits of the Mountain, and Torak shatters Eostra's power; however, she drags him with her into a deep chasm.

The fall almost kills Torak, but Wolf manages to find his souls and push them back into his body, restoring him to life. He then reunites with Darkfur and Pebble. In the spring, back at the Raven Camp, Renn reveals that Dark would be the new Raven Mage, not her, and she and Torak, accompanied by the three wolves, depart the Raven Camp to live a solitary life.

== Background ==
=== Writing ===
The book's author, Michelle Paver, wrote on 18 December 2008, the following on her official website: "I'm working extremely hard on the sixth and final book in the series, Ghost Hunter. I'm happy to say that it's going really, really well. However, it is quite a weird sensation to be writing the final book. At the moment, it seems inconceivable that I shall soon be saying goodbye to Torak, Renn, and Wolf. I know that I'll miss them terribly. In another way, though, I know that I'll be delighted and proud to have brought Torak's story to a dramatically satisfying conclusion. "

Paver confirmed in her official podcast that the Soul Eater Eostra will be a main character in the book. She said that writing the book had given her bad dreams, particularly the parts with Eostra, but she considered it to be a good sign.

=== Cover ===
Paver said: "A week ago, though, I had a conversation with John Fordham, who designs the cover, and I told him the bare bones of the story, so he could start thinking of the cover. Given the themes in the book, it will probably be purplish, and Wolf and Torak may feature prominently. I sent John a photograph of an amazing Stone Age cave picture of an eagle owl. It's tens of thousands of years old and yet could have been made by Eostra yesterday. Seriously spooky. Who knows what design it will inspire?"

== Setting ==
Paver said on her official website that she would be traveling into the mountains to get inspiration for the book. She also said that she hoped to meet some eagle owls at close quarters, a hint that the book would feature Eostra.

== Reception ==
The Independent's Christina Hardyment called Ghost Hunter a "thrilling adventure" and highlighted novel's "thoroughly-researched wilderness lore". Hardyment concluded, "The finale is a climax as intense as Tolkien's fall of Mordor", and noted "Paver succeeds in creating a conclusion with no mawkishness when she resolves the relationship between Torak and Renn – and, of course, Wolf", who she deemed to be "everyone's favourite character".

LUCA777, writing for The Guardian, referred to the novel as a "magical adventure".
