= Kjell-Ole Haune =

Norwegian composer (born 1976)

Kjell-Ole Haune (born 1976 in Norway) is a composer and producer. He is best known for composing and producing Terje Vigen-The Musical, which is based on a poem by Henrik Ibsen, and the musical TONIGHT, for which he wrote the story, lyrics and music. He is the first Norwegian composer to have two of his own musicals produced in London's West End. He has also produced the book Terje Vigen, which is the first publication of this poem by Henrik Ibsen in English and German, (Published by Fagbokforlaget). The English translation is by John Northam with German translation by Odd Jensen.

== Biography ==
Haune was born in Norway on 29 March 1976, in Oslo. He started his musical career at the age of five when he joined St. Johannesguttene (boys choir) as the youngest to be recruited by musical director and operasinger Svein Brun. At the age of 7 he started taking piano lessons an at the age of 10 he joined the local School Marching Band, Snarøya Skoles Musikkorps, where he learnt to play the baritone and later the drums, the last to become his main instrument.

He was one of the first Norwegian students to enter and later graduate from Liverpool Institute for Performing Arts, (LIPA) founded by Sir Paul McCartney.

== TONIGHT The Musical ==
In 2000, at the age of 24, he produced his first musical TONIGHT in London's West End, at the Peacock Theatre. (Haune had written the story, lyrics and music). The musical was later staged in Oslo Concert Hall where the music was performed by Kringkastningsorkestret (The National Radio Symphony Orchestra). The performance was broadcast by NRK Radio.

== Terje Vigen The Musical ==
In 2006, as part of the 100th anniversary for Henrik Ibsen, Haune composed music to Ibsen's poem "Terje Vigen" and turned it into a multimedia musical. He was also responsible for producing the film for Terje Vigen together with film producer Bjørnar Fjeldvær. Terje Vigen has been on tour in Norway, and has also been performed in San Francisco in USA. In 2008, Terje Vigen the musical was staged at the Arts Theatre in London's West End. A CD was recorded in 2006 starring Rein Alexander.

== Other activities ==
Haune has written songs for various artists, and has been invited to perform for royal families. In 2007 he received a gold award for creating the most successful song for radio commercial in Norway. He has also been a guest lecturer at London School of Economics.

== Bibliography ==
- Terje Vigen by Henrik Ibsen. KOH Ltd, London 2006 ISBN 978-0-9552306-0-8
