= Happy, Texas (film) =

- Directed by: Mark Illsley
- Written by: Ed Stone; Mark Illsley; Phil Reeves
- Produced by: Mark Illsley, Rick Montgomery, Ed Stone
- Starring: Jeremy Northam; Steve Zahn; Ally Walker; Illeana Douglas; William H. Macy
- Cinematography: Bruce Douglas Johnson
- Edited by: Norman Buckley
- Music by: Peter Harris
- Production company: Marked Entertainment
- Distributed by: Miramax Films
- Release dates: January 1999 (Sundance); October 1, 1999 (United States)
- Running time: 98 minutes
- Country: United States
- Budget: $1.75 million
- Box office: $1.9 million

Happy, Texas is a 1999 American comedy film directed by Mark Illsley, and starring Steve Zahn, Jeremy Northam and William H. Macy. The film premiered at the 1999 Sundance Film Festival and was acquired by Miramax. It had a limited release in North American theaters on October 1, 1999.

== Plot ==
Three prisoners escape from a chain gang, and two of them, Wayne and Harry, steal an RV. They discover that the RV actually belongs to two gay men who travel around Texas as consultants for beauty pageants. They are apprehended by Chappy Dent, the sheriff of Happy, Texas, who mistakes the escapees for the pageant organizers. Posing as the organizers, Wayne and Harry proceed to help out with the pageant while hiding from the law and waiting for an opportunity to rob the local bank.

The duo's scheme is complicated by the fact that Chappy himself is gay and is attracted to the prisoner Harry. Straight Harry, on the other hand, becomes attracted to Josephine, the president of the bank. Meanwhile, "gay" David, also actually straight, gets involved with the local pageant coordinator, Doreen.

By the day of the big pageant, the third escaped convict has surfaced, leading Wayne and Harry to organize a break-in during the show. Harry calls in more police, and in the process, all three are apprehended. In the last scene, the pageant group that Wayne helped train came to the prison to show them the closing number, in the costumes he made.

== Cast ==
- Steve Zahn as Wayne Wayne Wayne Jr. (David)
- Jeremy Northam as Harry Sawyer (Steven 'Steve')
- William H. Macy as Sheriff Chappy Dent
- Ally Walker as Josephine "Joe" McClintock, the banker
- Illeana Douglas as Doreen Schaefer
- M. C. Gainey as Robert "Bob" Allen Maslow
- Ron Perlman as Marshal Nalhober
- Mo Gaffney as Mrs. Bromley
- Paul Dooley as The Judge
- Michael Hitchcock as Steven
- Kim Story as Guard

== Production ==
With the exception of a few scenes, the film was shot entirely on location in Piru, California. One scene was filmed at Oil Can Harry's in Studio City, Los Angeles.

== Reception ==
=== Release ===
The film debuted at the 1999 Sundance Film Festival. Its premiere sparked a bidding war between various arthouse film studios including Fox Searchlight, Independent Pictures, which had an output deal with New Line Cinema at the time, a joint bid by Paramount Classics and Summit Entertainment, and Trimark Pictures. Miramax won the bid, but reports conflicted on exactly how much the company paid to acquire the film. While Miramax maintained they only paid $2.5 million, other reports said the number was closer to $10 million.

Miramax gave the film a limited release in the United States on October 1, 1999. The film grossed $72,056 in its opening weekend and went on to gross nearly $2 million in the United States and Canada.

=== Critical reception ===
The film received an 81% rating on Rotten Tomatoes, based on 58 critics' reviews. The site's critics consensus states, "Happy, Texas is a simple, funny romantic comedy that benefits from a very talented cast and a good soundtrack." On Metacritic, the film has a score of 62 based on 31 critics' reviews.

Roger Ebert of the Chicago Sun-Times gave it three out of four. He wrote the film's strong point is its "actors sell the situation so amusingly--and warmly", Zahn is especially funny, and Northam is "a revelation...here is the slick, urbane British gentleman of 'Emma,' 'The Winslow Boy' and 'An Ideal Husband,' playing a Texas convict and not missing a beat". Ebert concluded, "Macy's performance as the quietly, earnestly in love sheriff is the most touching in the movie, another role in which he gets laughs by finding the truth beneath the humor."

=== Accolades ===
Macy and Zahn were nominated for Best Supporing Actor and Best Actor in a Motion Picture – Comedy or Musical at the 4th Golden Satellite Awards for their work in the film, with the former winning but the latter losing to Philip Seymour Hoffman for Flawless.

== Home media ==
The film was initially released on DVD on April 11, 2000, by Buena Vista Home Entertainment (under the Miramax Home Entertainment banner). At that time, all of Miramax's US home video releases were handled by Buena Vista Home Entertainment, the home video arm of their parent company Disney. The 2000 DVD release was part of Miramax's "Collector's Series" line. It 2000, it also received a VHS release through Buena Vista Home Entertainment/Miramax Home Entertainment. During the 1990s and 2000s, Miramax often licensed out their Australian home video releases to other distributors. The 2004 Australian DVD release of Happy, Texas was handled by Fox's Australian home video arm 20th Century Fox Home Entertainment South Pacific. On September 9, 2005, the film received a Taiwanese VCD release.

In December 2010, Miramax was sold by The Walt Disney Company, their owners since 1993. That same month, the studio was taken over by private equity firm Filmyard Holdings. Filmyard licensed the home media rights for several Miramax titles to Lionsgate, who reissued Happy, Texas on DVD on January 6, 2012. In 2011, Filmyard Holdings licensed the Miramax library to streamer Netflix. This streaming deal included Happy, Texas, and ran for five years, eventually ending on June 1, 2016.

Filmyard Holdings sold Miramax to Qatari company beIN Media Group in March 2016. In April 2020, ViacomCBS (now known as Paramount Skydance) acquired the rights to Miramax's library, after buying a 49% stake in the studio from beIN. Happy, Texas is among the 700 titles they acquired in the deal, and since April 2020, the film has been distributed by Paramount Pictures. On March 4, 2021, Happy, Texas was made available on Paramount's then-new streaming service Paramount+, as one of its inaugural launch titles. Paramount also included it on their free streaming service Pluto TV.

== Soundtrack ==
Happy, Texas: Music from the Miramax Motion Picture

Soundtrack album by various artists
- Released: September 14, 1999
- Genres: Country, Tejano, exotica
- Length: 49:08
- Label: Arista

Professional ratings
Review scores
Source	Rating
AllMusic	3/5 stars

The soundtrack album for Happy, Texas features a mix of mostly country music by such artists as Emmylou Harris, Alison Krauss, Lee Roy Parnell, Pam Tillis, Brad Paisley and BR5-49. There are also bits of Tejano (Flaco Jimenez) and exotica (Yma Sumac).

=== Track listing ===
1. "Passin' Through" (Randy Scruggs and Joan Osborne) – 5:16
2. "Good at Secrets" (Kim Richey) – 4:20
3. "This Little Light of Mine"/"Fort Davis Contestant" (Carly Fink) – 0:17
4. "Are You Happy Baby?" (Lee Roy Parnell and Keb' Mo') – 2:27
5. "Ordinary Heart" (Emmylou Harris) – 2:58
6. "Baila Este Ritmo" (Flaco Jiménez) – 3:17
7. "After a Kiss" (Pam Tillis) – 4:10
8. "Me Neither" (Brad Paisley) – 3:22
9. "Stay" (Alison Krauss) – 3:26
10. "Half a Man" (Shannon Brown) – 2:35
11. "Gopher Mambo" (Yma Sumac) – 2:17
12. "Honky Tonk Song" (BR5-49) – 2:38
13. "That Buckin' Song (Saddle Sore Mix)" (Robert Earl Keen) – 3:51
14. "Hurdy Gurdy Monkey Shine" (Road Kings) – 2:17
15. "Happiness" (Abra Moore) – 4:28
16. "It's Oh So Quiet" (Happy Girls) – 1:29
  - Cover of song popularized by Björk

== See also ==
- List of American films of 1999
