= Dark Matter (Paver novel) =

2010 novel by Michelle Paver

- First edition
- Author: Michelle Paver
- Language: English
- Genre: Speculative fiction Horror; Ghost story
- Publisher: Orion Publishing Group
- Publication date: 21 October 2010
- Publication place: United Kingdom
- Media type: Print (Hardback)
- Pages: 256 (Hardcover)
- ISBN: 978-1-4091-2378-1
- Preceded by: Chronicles of Ancient Darkness

Dark Matter is a speculative fiction novel by Michelle Paver. Part horror, part ghost story, it was published in the United Kingdom by the Orion Publishing Group on 21 October 2010.

== Plot introduction ==
In London in 1937, 28-year-old Jack Miller is stuck in a dead-end job and jumps at the chance to be a wireless operator on a year-long Arctic expedition to Gruhuken on the northeast coast of Svalbard, though he has reservations about the class divide separating him from the other, Oxford University-educated, members of the team. Bad luck seems to dog the expedition and when they arrive at Longyearbyen for the last leg of their journey they are warned to choose another destination as their base, but the vague rumours about Gruhuken fail to dissuade them.

== Critical reception ==
Eric Brown of The Guardian described the book as "a spellbinding read" and "the kind of subtly unsettling, understated ghost story MR James might have written had he visited the Arctic."

Dark Matter was nominated for a Shirley Jackson Award for best novel.
