= John Northam =

Academic (1922–2004)

John Richard Northam (12 January 1922 – 5 July 2004) was a professor emeritus of literature and drama, ranked among the foremost Ibsen scholars in the world.

== Biography ==
Northam attended St Olave’s Grammar School in London and in 1941 received a scholarship to Clare College, Cambridge to read Classics from 1941 to 1942, then English between 1946 and 1948. In 1950 he was made a Fellow of Clare College, where he supervised Norman Podhoretz, the American who went on to become a notable writer. In 1953 Northam was awarded a Ph.D. and a lectureship in the Faculty of English at Cambridge. In 1972 he left Cambridge to become a Professor of Modern and Comparative Drama at the University of Bristol.

His books Ibsen’s Dramatic Method (1953), in which he notably outlines the hidden visual suggestions and parallel characterisations used by the playwright, and Ibsen: A Critical Study (1973), are still counted as standard works. He has been celebrated for capturing the poetry, humour and wisdom of Ibsen's Poems (1871) and verse drama Peer Gynt (1867); for his remarkable translations of the Epic Brand, a long epic poem unfinished from the playwright’s hand, and also the dramatic 1866 play Brand. He also provided composer and producer Kjell-Ole Haune with a translation of Ibsen's poem Terje Vigen that was developed into a multi media musical in 2006. This translation was published in 2006.

His son is the award-winning actor Jeremy Northam, who played Ivor Novello in Robert Altman's Gosford Park.

== Bibliography ==
- Ibsen’s Dramatic Method. A Study of the Prose Dramas. Faber and Faber. London 1953.
- Ibsen’s Dramatic Method. A Study of the Prose Dramas. (2nd Edition). Universitetsforlaget. Oslo 1971.
- Ibsen: A Critical Study. Cambridge University Press 1973.
- Terje Vigen by Henrik Ibsen. KOH Ltd, London 2006 ISBN 978-0-9552306-0-8

=== Translations ===
- Ibsen’s Poems. Scandinavian University Press. Oslo 1986. ISBN 82-00-07455-2.
- Peer Gynt. A Dramatic Poem. Scandinavian University Press. Oslo 1995. ISBN 82-00-22496-1.
- Terje Vigen by Henrik Ibsen. KOH Ltd, London 2006 ISBN 978-0-9552306-0-8
