= Spirit Walker (novel) =

2005 fantasy novel by Michelle Paver

- UK cover of the book
- Author: Michelle Paver
- Illustrator: Geoff Taylor
- Cover artist: John Fordham
- Language: English
- Series: Chronicles of Ancient Darkness
- Genre: Children's adventure, fantasy novel
- Published: 2005 Orion Children's Books
- Publication place: United Kingdom
- Media type: Print (hardback and paperback), audio book (CD & cassette)
- Pages: 360 (paperback)
- ISBN: 1-84255-170-1 (first edition, hardback)
- OCLC: 60671707
- Preceded by: Wolf Brother
- Followed by: Soul Eater

Spirit Walker is the second book in the series Chronicles of Ancient Darkness written by Michelle Paver and illustrated by Geoff Taylor. The plot follows Torak and his friends travelling to the mysterious Seal Islands to find a cure for a terrible sickness circulating throughout the forest in which they live.

The book was first published in 2005 by Orion Children's Books. It received positive reviews from critics.

Spirit Walker is preceded by Wolf Brother (2004), and followed by Soul Eater (2006), Outcast (2007), Oath Breaker (2008), Ghost Hunter (2009), Viper's Daughter (2020), Skin Taker (2021), and Wolfbane (2022).

== Plot summary ==
Six months after the events of Wolf Brother, Torak is now living with the Raven Clan. One of the clan members, Oslak, becomes sick and attempts to kill himself and his young nephew, but is stopped by Fin-Kedinn. Torak suspects that the sickness has been created by the Soul-Eaters. Torak realises that a small creature has been stalking him and trying to kill him, and when Oslak escapes and kills himself, Torak discovers that the creature was responsible. With the sickness spreading through the Forest, Torak sneaks out of the camp and sets out to seek a cure. Meanwhile Wolf, Torak's companion who now lives in a pack, grows restless and uneasy, and ventures off to find Torak.

Renn has also encountered the creature at the Raven Camp. The clan's mage, Sauenn, explains that it is a tokoroth: a young child transformed into a demon possessed zombie. Renn sneaks out of the camp to find Torak, and she eventually runs into Wolf. Torak encounters and fights three boys from the Seal Clan: Bale, Detlan and Asrif, but is eventually overpowered. They take him to judgement on their islands, as he has inadvertently broken a law about Forest Clans entering the Sea. Renn and Wolf meet some members of the Sea Eagle Clan, who take them both to the Seal Islands, and learn that a taboo act has been committed: an orca has been killed.

When Torak informs the Seals of the sickness, he learns that it visited their islands two years earlier, and their mage, Tenris, promises that a cure can be made. Torak quickly realises the tokoroth has followed him to the island; he is rescued from one of its traps by Wolf and Renn. Torak goes with Bale, Detlan and Asrif to obtain a plant for the cure; he risks his life for them and gains their respect. While underwater, he feels himself taking the form of a seal for a few moments and senses an angry orca approaching, before returning to his own body. The boys rush into the water to save Torak as an orca attacks Detlan, causing him a crippling injury. Tenris later explains that Torak must be a Spirit Walker: a human with the rare ability to move their souls out of their own body and into the body of any other living creature.

Renn realises that Tenris was responsible for killing the orca, and that he is a Soul-Eater. Tenris tricks Bale and Torak into thinking that Renn is sick, and that her accusations are insane. Tenris then overpowers Torak with the help of his tokoroths. He confirms that he is a Soul-Eater, and that he not only killed the orca, but also created the demon bear which killed Torak's father, (Note: As depicted in Wolf Brother.) and sent the sickness to the Forest to flush out the powerful individual who defeated it. Revealing that he is the brother of Torak's father, Tenris prepares to eat Torak's heart to take his power for himself.

Renn persuades Bale to help, and together with Wolf, they help to free Torak. Tenris is killed by an orca seeking revenge, but manages to tell Torak that Fin-Kedinn knows more about his father than he's let on. Torak, Renn, and Wolf bid Bale farewell, and knowing the secret of the sickness, they return to the Forest. Fin-Kedinn reveals that Torak's father, like Tenris, was a Soul-Eater, but turned against them when they turned evil. Fin-Kedinn tells Torak that he, with his Spirit Walking ability, has the power to defeat the Soul-Eaters. Torak vows to do just that.

== Reception ==
Many critics felt Spirit Walker was superior to the previous book in the series, Wolf Brother.

Kirkus Reviews highlighted how "Paver incorporates vivid descriptions of her characters' woodcraft and other skills, as well as credible views of their oneness with the natural world and animistic beliefs – details that enrich her complex tale without impeding its quick pace."

Some critics expressed concern that the book might scare younger readers.

== Translations ==
Spirit Walker has been published in a variety of different languages, including Dutch, French, German, Italian, Norwegian, Korean, Japanese, Polish, and Swedish.
