= Tom Brown's Schooldays (1951 film) =

British drama by Gordon Parry

- Directed by: Gordon Parry
- Screenplay by: Noel Langley
- Based on: the novel by Thomas Hughes
- Produced by: Brian Desmond Hurst
- Starring: John Howard Davies; Robert Newton; James Hayter
- Cinematography: C. M. Pennington-Richards
- Edited by: Kenneth Heeley-Ray
- Music by: Richard Addinsell
- Color process: Black and white
- Production company: Talisman Productions
- Distributed by: Renown Pictures (UK); United Artists (US)
- Release dates: 17 April 1951 (UK); 2 November 1951 (US)
- Running time: 93 minutes
- Country: United Kingdom
- Language: English

Tom Brown's Schooldays is a 1951 British drama film, directed by Gordon Parry, produced by Brian Desmond Hurst, and starring John Howard Davies, Robert Newton, John Charlesworth and James Hayter. It is based on the 1857 novel of the same name by Thomas Hughes.

== Cast ==
- John Howard Davies as Tom Brown
- Robert Newton as Dr Thomas Arnold
- John Charlesworth as East
- James Hayter as Old Thomas
- John Forrest as Flashman
- Michael Hordern as Wilkes
- Brian Worth as Judd
- Rachel Gurney as Mrs Arthur
- Max Bygraves as coach guard
- Francis de Wolff as Squire Brown
- Diana Wynyard as Mrs Thomas Arnold
- Hermione Baddeley as Sally Harrowell
- Kathleen Byron as Mrs Brown
- Amy Veness as Mrs Wixie
- Michael Brennan as Black Bart
- Michael Ward as Turke
- Neil North as Diggs
- Glyn Dearman as Arthur
- Ben Aris as Tadpole
- Peter Scott as Gower

== Production ==
Rugby School was used as a filming location.

== Box office ==
The film was a hit at the British box office, being judged by Kinematograph Weekly as a "notable performer" at British cinemas in 1951.

== Critical reception ==
Monthly Film Bulletin said "The opening scenes of Tom Brown's Schooldays establish a pleasing atmosphere. Tom's arrival at the school and the early scenes at Rugby (particularly the charmingly handled sing-song) give rise to hopes that the director might pull off this almost impossible subject. After this, however, the script fatally compromises: the boring scenes chronicling Doctor Arnold's struggle to improve the school (his part is written as that of a lonely, single-minded reformer with none of the traditional severity), and the awkwardly tacked-on serminising at the end, spoil the robust, Boy's Own Paper feeling of the opening without substituting a new one. This apart, the film's main failure lies in John Howard Davies' lifeless playing of Tom. John Forrest overplays Flashman atrociously, which might not have mattered had the film stuck consistently to its boisterous, schoolboy story intentions. Robert Newton is, by contrast, surprisingly subdued, while John Charlesworth and Glyn Dearman play naturally and well among a large cast of self-conscious boys."

"Isn't quite as good as the 1940 Hollywood adaptation," thought Allmovie; whereas The New York Times found it "superior in every way to the one made in Hollywood some years back. The quaint customs have an English-cut, at least".

Variety applauded the acting of John Howard Davies, Robert Newton and "a standout performance by John Forrest as the sneering, bullying Flashman".

Time Out approved the "solidly carpentered third screen version of Thomas Hughes' famous Rugby story – atmospherically shot on location in the old school itself."

The Radio Times Guide to Films gave the film 3/5 stars, writing: "Shot on location at Rugby School, this is a reverential, if rather lacklustre, rendition of Thomas Hughes's famous portrait of public school life. Robert Newton gives a performance of almost saintly sincerity as the headmaster intent on ridding his school of class prejudice and bullying. John Howard Davies does a nice line in smiling through the tears as Tom Brown, but the film belongs squarely to John Forrest, who, as Flashman, is the epitome of vicious snobbery."

Leslie Halliwell said: "Unexciting remake featuring one surprisingly strong performance."

In British Sound Films: The Studio Years 1928–1959 David Quinlan rated the film as "average", writing: "Faithful but uninspired version of a classic story: a popular success however."
