= Neil North =

British actor (1932–2007)

- Born: Neil Dermot North; 18 October 1932; Quetta, India
- Died: 7 March 2007 (aged 74); London, England
- Occupation: Actor
- Years active: 1947–1956; 1998–2007

Neil North (18 October 1932 – 7 March 2007) was a British actor, best known for his role in the 1948 film adaptation of Terence Rattigan's play The Winslow Boy. North appeared in four other films released between 1948 and 1951, but did not make acting a full-time career. After a hiatus of over 40 years however, he did return to the screen with three further credits towards the end of his life, including a role in the 1999 remake of The Winslow Boy.

== Early life ==
North was born in Quetta, British India, the youngest son of an officer in the Indian army. After a peripatetic childhood spent at various schools in India and Britain, North became a pupil at the King's School in Canterbury, Kent. He developed an interest in drama, and in 1947 was cast in the role of the Boy King, Richard II, in a production of Laurie Lee's play Peasant's Priest which was staged as part of that year's Canterbury Festival. His performance impressed director Bernard Miles, and when Miles learned that film director Anthony Asquith was searching for a public school boy with acting experience for the title role in a screen version of The Winslow Boy, he put North's name forward.

North landed the role of Ronnie Winslow in The Winslow Boy, a drama based on a cause célèbre of 1908 when George Archer-Shee, a 13-year-old schoolboy, was expelled from Osborne Naval College after being accused of stealing and cashing a postal order for five shillings (25p) that had been sent to a fellow pupil. The film was a high-profile production starring some of the most respected names in British film and theatre, including Robert Donat, Cedric Hardwicke and Margaret Leighton. The film proved to be a box-office success and North's performance was widely admired, notably in a famous scene with Donat in which the latter (cast as a barrister) harries and bullies the boy to satisfy himself of the boy's innocence before agreeing to accept the brief.

North went on to appear in minor roles in the films Mr. Perrin and Mr. Traill (1948), Britannia Mews (1949), Traveller's Joy (1949) and Tom Brown's Schooldays (1951).

== Later life ==
At some point in or around 1951, North was called up for compulsory national service, but failed to report on the specified date. Knowing that the British authorities would be on his trail, he fled initially to the Republic of Ireland and thence to Italy, where he spent several years. By 1955 he had settled in the United States, establishing a successful antiques business in New York City with his partner, Charles Gibson. He made sporadic ventures into acting at this time, notably in a 1956 Kraft Television Theatre adaptation of A Night to Remember.

Following the break-up of his relationship and the dissolution of the antiques business, North moved to Florida where he spent some years as a speedboat racer, before moving again in 1980 to Cuernavaca, Mexico. It is not clear exactly when North finally decided to return to Britain, but he was back by the mid-1990s. He learned that director David Mamet was planning a remake of The Winslow Boy and contacted an agent, who arranged a reading with Mamet. Mamet was favourably impressed and cast North in the role of First Lord of the Admiralty – Mamet later said that at the time of casting he had no idea that North had starred in the 1948 film, and that it came as an unexpected bonus to discover his association with the story.

North played a minor role as one of the four tutors in the hugely successful 2000 film Billy Elliot. His last screen appearance was as an extra in Robert De Niro's 2006 film The Good Shepherd.

North died in London on 7 March 2007, aged 74.

== Filmography ==
- 1948 : The Winslow Boy – dir. Anthony Asquith
- 1948 : Mr. Perrin and Mr. Traill – dir. Lawrence Huntington
- 1949 : Britannia Mews – dir. Jean Negulesco
- 1949 : Traveller's Joy – dir. Ralph Thomas
- 1951 : Tom Brown's Schooldays – dir. Gordon Parry
- 1999 : The Winslow Boy – dir. David Mamet
- 2000 : Billy Elliot – dir. Stephen Daldry
- 2006 : The Good Shepherd – dir. Robert De Niro
