= Oath Breaker (novel) =

2008 fantasy novel by Michelle Paver

- Author: Michelle Paver
- Illustrator: Geoff Taylor
- Cover artist: John Fordham
- Language: English
- Series: Chronicles of Ancient Darkness
- Genre: Children's adventure, fantasy novel
- Published: 2008 Orion Children's Books
- Publication place: United Kingdom
- Media type: Print (hardback & paperback), audio book (CD & cassette)
- Pages: 356 (paperback)
- ISBN: 1-84255-170-1 (first edition, hardback)
- OCLC: 262884043
- Preceded by: Outcast
- Followed by: Ghost Hunter

Oath Breaker is the fifth book in the Chronicles of Ancient Darkness series written by Michelle Paver and illustrated by Geoff Taylor. It was published in 2008 by Orion Children's Books.

Oath Breaker is preceded by Wolf Brother (2004), Spirit Walker (2005), Soul Eater (2006), and Outcast (2007), and followed by Ghost Hunter (2009), Viper's Daughter (2020), Skin Taker (2021), and Wolfbane (2022).

== Plot summary ==
Suspecting that the last fragment of the fire opal is hidden on the Seal Islands, Torak, Renn and Bale are searching for it there. After Bale asks Torak for his permission to take Renn as his mate, which leads to Torak storming off, Bale is murdered by Thiazzi the Oak Mage, who finds and takes the fragment. Torak, guilt-ridden and remorseful since he left Bale alone, vows to avenge Bale's death. He is joined by Renn, Wolf, and Fin-Kedinn on a journey into the Deep Forest, Thiazzi's home, where the Forest Horse and Auroch Clans are at war.

On the Deep Forest, Fin-Kedinn is injured and turns back. Torak and Renn soon discover that Thiazzi is controlling the Deep Forest clans by impersonating their mages. When a forest fire takes hold, Torak and Renn are separated. Torak eventually finds his way to Thiazzi, while Renn defies the Deep Forest clan who captures her by showing them her bond with Wolf and the ravens, Rip and Rek, an ability which they do not believe a woman could have. Having been kidnapped by Thiazzi and imprisoned in a giant, hollow tree, she cuts herself free in time to avoid choking on smoke, and climbs to the top, from where she sees Torak fighting Thiazzi.

She throws a burning brand of wood to Torak, and a burning ember sets fire to Thiazzi's hair. He falls to his death as Eostra's eagle owl snatches the fire opal from the Oak Mage. As Torak is preparing to leave the deep forest, Durrain, the Red Deer Clan leader reveals to Torak that his when his mother gave birth to him, the World Spirit prophesied that her child would be the one to vanquish the Soul Eaters, and that the child would be a spirit walker, but he would be named clanless, and his mother would die. Torak and Renn then returns to the open forest.

A few days later, Wolf and his mate Darkfur show Torak and Renn their new cubs. Torak grimly starts preparing for an upcoming fight against Eostra, the Eagle Owl Mage, the last and greatest Soul Eater.

== Reception ==
According to Booklist's Ilene Cooper, Oath Breaker has "plenty of heart-stopping action mixed with metaphysical moments". Similarly, School Library Journal's Genevieve Gallagher highlighted how "Paver blends her knowledge of animals and the ancient European landscape with magic and legend".
