= Michelle Paver =

British novelist (born 1960)

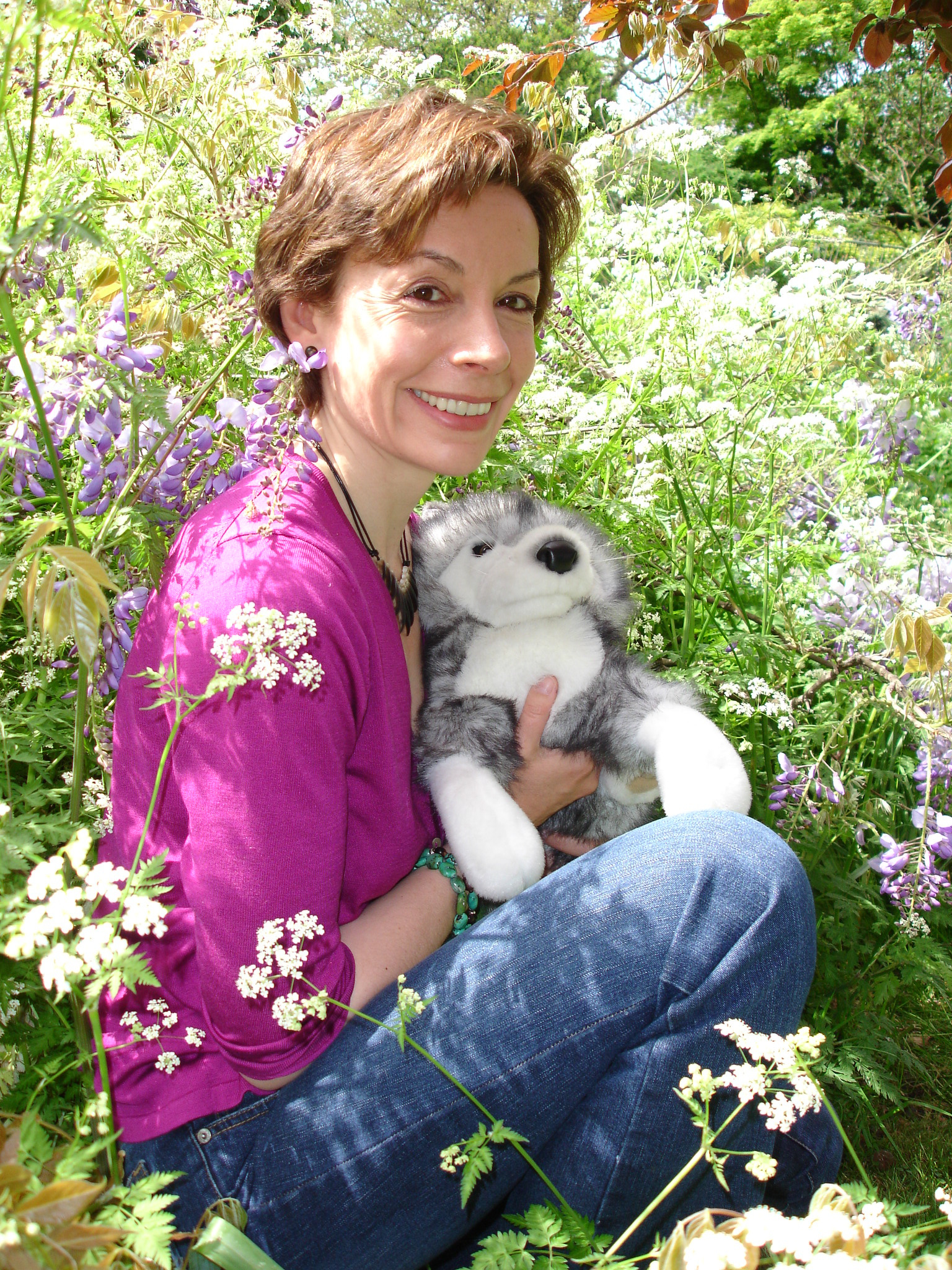
- Paver in 2005
- Born: 7 September 1960 (age 65); Blantyre, Nyasaland
- Citizenship: British
- Education: Lady Margaret Hall, Oxford
- Occupation: Novelist
- Writing career
- Period: 2000–present
- Genres: Children's literature; historical fiction; historical fantasy; horror
- Notable work: Wolf Brother (2004)
- Notable awards: Guardian Children's Fiction Prize; 2010
- Website: michellepaver.com

Michelle Paver (born 7 September 1960) is a British novelist. She is known for the children's historical fantasy series Chronicles of Ancient Darkness, set in prehistoric Europe, which began with Wolf Brother in 2004. The book has sold more than 2.5 million copies and has been translated into 30 languages.

Born in Nyasaland (now Malawi), Paver moved to England as a young child. She worked as a solicitor before becoming a full-time writer. Her other works include the children's series Gods and Warriors, the Daughters of Eden trilogy and several standalone novels for adults.

== Biography ==
=== Early life ===
Michelle Paver was born on 7 September 1960 in Blantyre, Nyasaland (now Malawi), to a Belgian mother and South African father. Her father ran the Nyasaland Times. In 1963, her family moved to Wimbledon, England. She was educated at Wimbledon High School. After taking a first-class degree in biochemistry at Lady Margaret Hall, Oxford, she became a solicitor and, after five years, a partner at a City of London law firm.

Paver's father's death in 1996 led her to take a one-year sabbatical, during which she travelled in France and the United States and wrote the first draft of Without Charity. She resigned from legal practice soon after her return to write full time.

=== Writing career ===
==== Standalone novels ====
Paver's first adult historical novel, Without Charity, was published in 2000. The novel moves between modern London, Edwardian England and the Boer War. It was followed in 2001 by A Place in the Hills, set in Provence.

Her later standalone works include the ghost novel Dark Matter (2010), set in the Arctic, which was nominated for a Shirley Jackson Award for Best Novel; Thin Air (2016), a supernatural mountaineering novel set in the Himalayas; and Wakenhyrst (2019), a gothic novel set in the Fens. Rainforest, described by The Bookseller as an "immersive" companion story to Dark Matter and Thin Air, was published in 2025.

==== Daughters of Eden ====
Paver's Daughters of Eden trilogy was published from 2002 to 2005. It consists of The Shadow Catcher, in which Madeleine travels from Victorian Scotland to a Jamaican plantation; Fever Hill, set in Jamaica in 1903; and The Serpent's Tooth, set during the First World War.

==== Chronicles of Ancient Darkness ====
In 2004, Paver published Wolf Brother, the first book in her Chronicles of Ancient Darkness series and her first book for children. The book has sold more than 2.5 million copies and has been translated into 30 languages. Paver was paid a reported £2.8 million advance for the first book.

The series is set in prehistoric Northern Europe and comprises nine novels published from 2004 to 2022. It follows Torak, a twelve-year-old clanless boy, and his companions Renn and Wolf. The central story concerns Torak's conflict with the Soul Eaters, a group of clan mages. Paver won the Guardian Children's Fiction Prize for the sixth book, Ghost Hunter (2009).

==== Gods and Warriors ====
Paver's second children's series, Gods and Warriors, is set during the Bronze Age. It follows Hylas, a twelve-year-old goatherd, and Pirra, the daughter of a high priestess. The story takes place in areas including Ancient Crete and Ancient Egypt and includes animal characters, among them a dolphin, a lion and a falcon.

== Bibliography ==
=== Daughters of Eden trilogy ===
1. The Shadow Catcher (2002)
2. Fever Hill (2004)
3. The Serpent's Tooth (2005)

=== Chronicles of Ancient Darkness series ===
1. Wolf Brother (2004)
2. Spirit Walker (2005)
3. Soul Eater (2006)
4. Outcast (2007)
5. Oath Breaker (2008)
6. Ghost Hunter (2009)
7. Viper's Daughter (2020)
8. Skin Taker (2021)
9. Wolfbane (2022)

=== Gods and Warriors series ===
1. The Outsiders (2013) / Gods and Warriors (2012)
2. The Burning Shadow (2013)
3. Eye of the Falcon (2014)
4. The Crocodile Tomb (2015)
5. Warrior Bronze (2016)

=== Standalone books ===
- Without Charity (2000)
- A Place in the Hills (2001)
- Dark Matter (2010)
- Thin Air (2016)
- Wakenhyrst (2019)
- Rainforest (2025)
