= Chronicles of Ancient Darkness =

Historical fantasy novel series by Michelle Pave

- Spines of the six first editions
- Wolf Brother; Spirit Walker; Soul Eater; Outcast; Oath Breaker; Ghost Hunter; Viper's Daughter; Skin Taker; Wolfbane
- Author: Michelle Paver
- Illustrator: Geoff Taylor (chapter headings)
- Country: United Kingdom
- Language: English
- Genre: Historical
- Publisher: Orion
- Published: 2004–2009, 2020–2022
- Media type: Print (hardcover & paperback), audiobook (CD & cassette)
- No. of books: 9

Chronicles of Ancient Darkness is a series of historical fantasy novels by the British author Michelle Paver and her first books for children. The books chronicle the adventures of Torak, an adolescent boy, and his friends Renn and Wolf. The main story arc revolves around Torak and his quest to defeat the Soul Eaters, a group of power hungry mages who seek to destroy all life in the forest. Paver has called it simply "a single story: the tale of Torak's discovery of himself and his world."

Since the first book in the series, Wolf Brother, was released on the 30th of May in 2004, the series has gained critical acclaim and commercial success worldwide. Wolf Brother became a national bestseller in the United States, and the rights to the series were bought by 20th Century Fox to be made into major motion pictures. In October 2013, Nick Hirschkorn's production company Feel Films picked up the film rights, with Will Davies attached as screenwriter.

The books are set 6000 years ago in prehistoric Europe during the Stone Age. The main character, Torak, alone in the world, meets a lone, scared wolf cub, Wolf with whom he can communicate (having spent around three months in a wolf den as a baby). A girl named Renn, who is part of the Raven Clan, befriends them and supports them throughout the series. Torak's quest, along with Renn and Wolf, is to defeat the Soul Eaters, a group of former clan mages who have turned to evil, and who seek to control the forest. The story is told primarily from three different third-person narratives: Torak, Renn and Wolf. Later books introduce an additional third-person narrative from the perspective of Dark.

For the book Ghost Hunter (2009) she won the Guardian Children's Fiction Prize, a book award judged by a panel of British children's writers.

In 2019, Paver announced that she would be returning to the Chronicles of Ancient Darkness with three further books, set after the end of the main series, once again following Torak, Renn and Wolf. The titles of the books were announced as: Viper's Daughter, Skin Taker and Wolfbane.

== Main characters ==
Torak, the main character, begins the series as a naive, defensive, and curious boy of twelve. This boy does not want to take on a quest but has to in order to save the world. Over the course of the novels, he acquires several spiritual titles, including "Spirit Walker", and learns of titles his late father had, including "Soul Eater": this last title causes numerous difficulties, due to his desire to end the Soul Eaters and the evil they cause. He is slow to mature emotionally, but from the fourth book on he is described as taller and brave, in sharp contrast to the short, scrawny boy portrayed in the first three books. He becomes protective of Renn in the later books as they grow closer: this often annoys and frustrates her. He has the power to vanquish the Soul-Eaters and at first despises his power: he eventually grows to accept it.

Renn, the niece of the Raven Clan's leader, Fin-Kedinn. She is a year younger than Torak and is described as slim and small in the first few books. Later on, she is portrayed as tough, courageous and is shown to be an expert in archery. She has been forced into becoming a mage all her life because of her skill with magic but, due to her mother being a Soul Eater, truly desires being a hunter. Torak, Wolf and Fin-Kedinn are her only true friends. Throughout the books, Renn is often described through Torak's eyes as older and beautiful, but is often frustrated by his seeming thoughtlessness. She also has a bad relationship with her brother, Hord, and disagrees with him many times throughout the first book.

Wolf, a wolf, is Torak's guide and adoptive brother. He grows from a wobbly cub to a young adult over the course of around a year, but stays with Torak and Renn throughout the series of books. As a cub his fur is grey, but as he matures his pelt molds into a golden grey tinged with white, with gold fur around his shoulders. At first he hates Renn intensely because of the way he treated her when he and Torak are first captured, and in the chapters that are written from his point of view, he initially refers to her as the "female tailless": as he develops affection to her, he begins to call her pack-sister. The author gives him an unusual vocabulary that often describes exactly what things are to a wolf or any other animal: for example, he refers to fire as the Bright Beast-that-Bites Hot. Wolf eventually finds a female wolf named Darkfur, with whom he produces cubs called Click, Shadow, and Pebble in one litter, Whitethroat and Blackear in the next, and Feather, Yip, Whitepaw, and Puff.

Fin-Kedinn is the wise leader of the Raven Clan, Renn's uncle and eventually Torak's foster father. In the past he was best friends with Torak's father and his brother Tenris, both of whom were ambitious to become mages. Fin-Kedinn was in love with Torak's mother, but she loved Fa, Torak's father, and followed him into exile when they fled the Soul-Eaters. Fin-Kedinn has won the respect of all the clans and even that of Wolf, who admires the 'lead wolf who smells of raven' because he has the habits of a wolf, such as only sleeping for short periods of time. Although impassive and refusing to show emotion, Fin-Kedinn cares deeply for both Renn and Torak.

The Soul-Eaters are a group of mages who united to combine their powers for the good of all people calling themselves the "Healers", but became corrupted and now wish to have power over everyone, using a crystal called the Fire Opal to make demons do their bidding. There were initially seven of mages in the group. Torak's late father, Fa, joined the group against his wife's advice, before rejecting their desire to take power. He summoned the seven together and shattered the Fire Opal into three pieces, causing a great fire that ripped across the forest. The Soul Eaters were scattered and Torak's father and mother went into exile. Torak's mother then gave birth to her son, and when she died shortly afterwards Fa continued his exile with his son for 12 years, before Fa's death at the beginning of the first novel. The seven mages were from the Otter Clan (the Walker/Narrander), Seal Clan (Tenris), Wolf Clan (Torak's Father), Bat Clan (Nef), Viper Clan (Seshru), Oak Clan (Thiazzi), and Eagle Owl Clan (Eostra).

Fa is Torak's father, the former Mage of the Wolf Clan, and one of the seven Soul Eaters. Although he only appears briefly at the start of Wolf Brother when he is killed by the demon bear, his legacy is the driving force behind the whole of the books. His name is never revealed, but is always referred to by Torak as 'Fa'. Once a young man coming from the secretive Wolf Clan, Fa's ambition was to become a Mage and he eventually succeeded, becoming the Wolf Clan Mage; in the words of the Clan Leader, Maheegun, Fa was the greatest Mage the clan ever had and succeeded in 'becoming wolf for a few heartbeats'. However, Fa was also naive and easily fooled in his youth and he blindly believed the promises and good intentions of the Soul Eaters. When they revealed to him their true natures, Fa tried to leave but they refused to let him. Determined to undo the evil he had unintentionally created, he summoned all of the Soul Eaters together and tried to kill all seven with fire before going into hiding with his wife. The World Spirit, angered by the Soul Eaters' crimes decreed that, Fa's son would be the one to destroy them and he granted him the ancient power of the spirit walker to help him accomplish his task. Fa raised Torak away from the clans after his wife's death to prevent the Soul Eaters from finding out about him and instead of teaching Torak magecraft, he decided to teach him important hunting and tracking skills, which would prove invaluable in Torak's quest to defeat the Soul Eaters.

Hord is Renn's brother. He unknowingly helps Tenris, who's acting as a 'crippled wanderer' create a demon by capturing a young bear. Throughout the first book Hord behaves stubbornly, and fueled by guilt, believes that he must deliver Torak's blood to the World Spirit himself. In the end, he follows Torak to the Mountain of the World Spirit and tries to kill him, he fails and he and the bear are killed by an avalanche created by the World Spirit.

Bale is a young man from the Seal clan who is also Torak's kinsman as Torak's paternal grandmother was from the Seal Clan. They initially get off to a bad start as he captures Torak and takes him to Seal Island, but later become friends. Bale first appears in the book Spirit Walker. Bale is killed in the beginning of the book Oath Breaker by the Soul Eater named Thiazzi, which sets Torak off on a quest for revenge.

Dark is a boy from the Swan Clan, who was abandoned by them at seven years old, for having pale skin, white hair, and the ability to see ghosts, causing his clan, and father, to believe him an omen of bad luck. Dark spent eight years living in The High Mountains, where he met Ark, a white raven who would become his companion. He initially runs into trouble with Torak, who he captures and traps in a mountain cave, but is eventually convinced to let him free, and he goes with him to the Mountain of Ghosts, where they are separated and he meets Renn. At the end of Ghost Hunter, the first book Dark appears in, he is made the mage of the Raven clan, following the death of Seaunn, the previous Raven Mage. From Vipers Daughter onwards, Dark is portrayed as naïve, as he's not used to living among people, or being a mage. He also develops a knack for carving animals, which he personifies and talks to when he's alone. In Skin Taker, Dark briefly leads a group of survivors in Fin-Kedinn's absence, and helps Renn perform the rite to bring back The First Tree. In Wolfbane, Dark makes best friends with, and later falls for, a boy named Kujai from the Sea-Eagle clan, who lends Torak and Renn a boat. He is also made Leader of the Raven Clan, alongside being mage, after Fin-Kedinn dies at the end of Wolfbane.

== Story ==
=== Wolf Brother ===
Torak is twelve years old when his father is killed by a bear that is possessed by a demon. As he is dying, he tells Torak to swear to find the Mountain of the World Spirit and ask for the Spirit's help in destroying the bear. On his journey he encounters Wolf, a lone wolf cub whose family has been killed by a flash flood. Wolf becomes Torak's guide in finding the World Spirit. Torak and Wolf are captured by the Raven Clan for hunting a deer on their land; they are befriended by Renn, the prickly and outspoken niece of the clan's leader Fin-Kedinn. Torak appears to be the fulfillment of a prophecy about a "listener" who will give his heart's blood to the Mountain of the World Spirit, kill the bear and defy the Soul-Eaters, a group of erstwhile Mages who were once healers but became power-hungry and now use their magic for selfish ends. Torak, Wolf and Renn journey to the Mountain, collecting the three parts of the Nanuak (the world soul in everything) that Torak needs to offer to the World Spirit. When Torak sets off to the Mountain with only Wolf to fulfill the prophecy, Renn's brother Hord follows Torak. Hord, who makes his dislike of Torak clear when they first meet, believes he must kill Torak and take his blood, as well as the Nanuak, to the Mountain. On the Mountain, as the bear gets closer, Torak and Hord fight. Torak realizes Hord unknowingly helped the Crippled Wanderer, one of the Soul Eaters, and his father's sworn enemy, create the bear. Torak also realizes that the heart's blood in the prophecy means Wolf. Knowing he must sacrifice Wolf for the World Spirit, Torak tells Wolf to run away. Wolf takes the three pieces of Nanuak to the mountain, as Hord and the bear are killed in an avalanche. Wolf leaves to join a pack of wolves and Torak, knowing his pack-brother still lives, returns to the Raven Clan.

=== Spirit Walker ===
The clans fall prey to a stalking sickness. Torak embarks on a search for a cure, which takes him to mysterious islands where the Seal Clan live. The Seal Mage, Tenris, promises to help him make a remedy. Torak meets a Seal Clan boy named Bale, who later becomes his friend. While on the island, Torak discovers that he is a spirit walker: his souls can move into other creatures, allowing him to feel and think as they do, but still remain himself. Tenris is not as helpful as he originally seemed: he is one of the Soul Eaters and plans to increase his powers by eating Torak's heart and becoming a spirit walker. Torak finds out that Tenris is actually his uncle, and the man known as the Crippled Wanderer who created the demon bear that killed Torak's father. As Tenris is about to kill Torak, Renn wounds Tenris, allowing Torak to escape. Tenris is killed by an orca, in revenge for Tenris killing its offspring for its teeth. Eventually, they discover the reason for the mysterious sickness is that Tenris sent demon-possessed children known as tokoroths to poison juniper berries.

=== Soul Eater ===
In their desire to subjugate all the clans, the Soul Eaters have captured a range of hunting animals, including Wolf, which they will sacrifice to unleash demons. They plan to control the demons with a fire opal. Torak and Renn make a dangerous journey across the frozen wilderness into the Far North to rescue Wolf; their friendship is tested to the limits and they become separated. They escape, but not before the Soul Eaters brand Torak against his will as one of them. Torak manages to deceive them into thinking Renn is the spirit walker who caused the death of Tenris. Renn, meanwhile, has possession of the fire-opal and is about to sacrifice herself to destroy it. When three of the Soul Eaters try to kill Torak, Renn and Wolf take back the fire opal, and Torak spirit walks into a polar bear to save his friends. Nef, one of the Soul Eaters, saves Renn and sacrifices herself instead, using her life to destroy the power of the fire opal and repay the Torak's father for saving her life before he was killed. Fin-Kedinn and some of the Raven Clan make the journey North and save Renn and Torak, and bring them back home. Torak is then told that the fire opal that was destroyed was only one of three parts. The original fire opal was broken by Torak's father to start the great fire that scattered the Soul Eaters. Another of the fragments was used by Tenris to create the demon bear and his tokoroths, and is believed to have been lost when he was killed. The whereabouts of the last fragment are unknown.

=== Outcast ===
After the secret of his Soul Eater mark is discovered, Torak is cast out by the clans, though Renn fiercely and furiously does all she can to stop it. Bale, who has traveled to the forests from his island in the sea, teams up with Renn to go after him: Renn helps him and then both Renn and Bale follow him as Torak wanders, suffering from insanity. Renn and Bale fight along the way, as Bale treats Renn condescendingly because of his beliefs about women, and he is confused about how strong and insistent Renn is. Renn sends help to Torak in the form of two ravens, which Torak has named Rip and Rek. While Torak is recovering his reason, Seshru the Viper Mage, a Soul Eater, uses her powers to draw him to her so she can control him. Renn and Bale together defy clan law by trying to help Torak. Seshru is revealed to be Renn's mother. Torak shows the clans that destroying him will not help them in their struggle against the Soul Eaters, and they accept him back. Fin-Kedinn makes Torak his foster son. Torak learns that his father hid the last fragment of the fire opal inside the knife he gave Torak before his death, and it is part of the reason why Seshru was hunting him. Seshru then steps forward to try and claim the fragment. Renn is about to kill Seshru, but Bale steals her bow and kills Seshru himself, because Renn would be tainted if she killed her own mother. In Seshru's final moments, Torak uses her life to destroy the fragment of the fire opal. Fin-Kedinn changes Torak's outcast tattoo, making him part of all types of clans. Bale also tells Torak and Fin-Kedinn that the fragment of the fire opal thought lost when Tenris was killed may not have been with him when he died. The three realize this was why the two surviving Soul Eaters were not hunting Torak as well.

=== Oath Breaker ===
While guarding the Seal Islands against the Soul Eaters for fear of them trying to take the last part of the Fire Opal, Bale asks Torak for his permission to take Renn for his mate, which angers Torak. Later, Bale is murdered by Thiazzi the Oak Mage, who then takes the last fragment of the fire opal. Torak vows to avenge Bale's death, and with Renn, Wolf and Fin-Kedinn follows Thiazzi into the Deep Forest where the Forest Horse and Auroch (sic) Clans are at war. As Torak, Renn and Fin-Kedinn are about to enter the Deep Forest, Fin-Kedinn is injured and turns back. Torak and Renn discover that Thiazzi is controlling the Deep Forest clans by impersonating their mages. A forest fire takes hold and Torak and Renn are separated. Torak finds his way to Thiazzi, while Renn is taken by the Auroch Clan. She defies the Auroch Clan and their belief that women can't be mages, by insisting that she is a mage and showing them her bond with Wolf and the ravens, Rip and Rek. She is then kidnapped by Thiazzi and imprisoned in a giant, hollow tree, where she cuts herself free in time to avoid choking on smoke. She climbs to the top, from where she sees Torak fighting Thiazzi. She throws a burning brand of wood to Torak, and a burning ember sets fire to Thiazzi's hair. He falls to his death as Eostra's eagle owl snatches the fire opal from the Oak Mage. Many months later, Wolf and his mate Darkfur show Torak and Renn their new cubs. Although Torak is happy for Wolf, the fight is not over, as Eostra, the last and most dangerous of the Soul Eaters, now possesses the fire opal.

=== Ghost Hunter ===
The Eagle Owl Mage, Eostra, sends a shadow sickness among the clans, to spread fear among them. Torak then sees his father's soul, seemingly in pain. Torak sets out alone to try and confront his destiny. Renn follows Torak, catching up with him. Wolf's family is then attacked by Eostra's owl, nearly sending Darkfur to her death, killing one of the cubs, and using the other to lure Wolf away for a time. Renn and Torak venture to the Mountain of Ghosts with a grieving Wolf to stop Eostra from killing all life in the forest. When Renn injures her leg because of Eostra's vicious dogs, Torak leaves without her: when she has recovered, she goes after him, furious. Torak is captured by a strange boy named Dark who has been cast out by his clan. After much pleading, Dark releases Torak and ventures with him to the Mountain of Ghosts. Torak and Wolf enter the Mountain, but Dark is trapped outside. Dark then meets Renn, who after trying to follow Torak had found Darkfur. Wolf's mate had nearly perished after going through miles in the snow with an infected wound to rescue her last cub. Torak and Wolf confront Eostra, who is summoning the ghosts of the dead Soul Eaters, including Torak's father. Renn and Dark also attempt to intervene, but Eostra appears unstoppable. Then the Walker, who appeared insane when Torak and Renn previously met him in Wolf Brother and Soul Eater, arrives and reveals himself to be Narrander, the seventh Soul Eater thought to have been killed in the great fire years before. Torak destroys the Fire Opal, breaking Eostra's hold over the dead Soul Eaters. Eostra then tries to use Torak's hair to claim his power. Narrander summons the Hidden People to cause a rockfall. Eostra falls into a crevice, pulling Torak with her. Shortly afterwards, Wolf finds Torak's body and forces Torak's spirit to re-enter it. Renn, Dark, Rip and Rek reunite with Torak and Wolf. The last of Wolf's cubs, Pebble, who has survived his ordeal, is then discovered by his parents. Three months later, Dark is named the new Raven Mage, and, after saying goodbye to Fin-Kedinn and promising to return one day, Torak and Renn set off with Wolf, Darkfur, Pebble, and the ravens Rip and Rek, to continue to explore the forest.

=== Viper's Daughter ===
Two summers after the final defeat of the Soul Eaters, Torak and Renn have been living their own life apart from the Clans, with Wolf, Darkfur and their growing pack of new cubs. However, their happiness is broken when Renn disappears without warning. After seeking guidance from Dark and Fin-Kedinn, Torak and Wolf leave Darkfur and the cubs behind to follow Renn, who has left for the Far North in search of answers. Unbeknownst to Torak, Renn has left the Forest because of visions she has had of her mother, the Soul Eater Seshru, and because of several events in the days leading to her departure where she had almost accidentally killed Torak. Fearing that her Magecraft power, which she had left untouched for the past two summers, was resurfacing, she had left to find answers in the Far North.

As the three heroes travel the icy wastelands beyond the limits of the Forest, they come across old friends from the White Fox Clan and make the acquaintance of the Narwhal Clan, a much harder ice clan which raises its hunters in the hard, unforgiving hands of their uncles rather than their parents to prepare them for the difficult life of living on the ice. Renn is saved by a young Narwhal clan hunter named Naiginn and, when Torak and Wolf catch up to them, she reveals that Naiginn is actually her half-brother. Seshru had come to the Far North following the Great Fire which had broken apart the Soul Eaters the first time. There, she had seduced the Narwhal clan Mage and born him a child. Much as she had planned for Renn, she had turned the child into a demon-possessed tokoroth. Renn, assisted by Naiginn, is determined to find his father and discover the reasons why she has suddenly become compelled to harm her mate. Knowing Torak will never let her go, she drugs him in the night and leaves with Naiginn.

Torak awakes and, after continuing his search with Wolf's help, realizes that, whenever he, Renn or Wolf were in Naiginn's presence, they felt their old wounds from demon attacks had started reopening. Meanwhile, Naiginn turns on Renn and reveals that, unlike for her, Seshru had succeeded with him: she had turned him into a tokoroth bearing her Mage's gift. However, unwilling to let him run wild when she returned to the Forest to rejoin the Soul Eaters, she had bound his power and his demon nature with a charm, guaranteeing that she would release him when she returned to claim him. But, when Seshru died on Laxe Axehead, Naiginn's curse remained in place and condemned him to grow as a man without being able to free his demon nature. Eager to finally be free, Naiginn tricked Renn into believing she had almost killed Torak in the Forest, knowing she would follow her mother's path to the Far North where he could make her break Seshru's curse.

Torak and Wolf, aided by Naiginn's father, Marupai and a young halfman (girl) named Shamik from the Narwhal clan, trace Naiginn and Renn to the Edge of the World, a volcanic opening where an opening to the demonic Otherworld can be found. Naiginn wants to use the power of the Edge of the World to allow Renn to break his curse, but the proximity of flames (counter to Naiginn's nature as an ice demon) weaken him. Renn escapes and Wolf summons the ancient spirits of the long-dead mammoths to hunt the demons, who fear them. Naiginn disappears and Torak, Renn, Wolf and Shamik (eager to escape the abuse she suffers from the Narwhals) return to the Forest. However, although they promise to tell each other the truth from that moment onwards, Renn does not tell Torak that she is still seeing visions of Seshru.

=== Skin Taker ===
In Midwinter, the Clans are preparing for the Sunwake, a ceremony to celebrate the return of the Sun after its winter sleep when disaster strikes the Forest. A phenomenon the Clans call the Thunderstar hits, devastating the Forest. Several Clans are killed by the devastation, including the Lynx and Boar Clans, and dozens of hunters from other Clans are lost. Animals hibernating for the winter, such as bears, are awoken by the Thunderstar's fall, and the destruction of the trees has freed demons from the Otherworld. Torak and Renn, living separately from the Raven Clan with their pack made up of Wolf, Darkfur, Pebble and two small cubs, are not spared the destruction; the cubs are killed and Pebble is believed dead for a time until he is found alive by Dark, the Raven Clan Mage. The ghosts of the dead remain, haunting the land instead of moving on. And Torak, who has spirit walked inside the trees and felt the soul of the Forest, is badly affected by the disaster.

Survivors converge on the remains of the camp where several Clans had been gathering for the Sunwake ceremony, unanimously choosing Raven Leader Fin-Kedinn to lead the survivors and he immediately calls a Clanmeet to discuss the crisis facing them all. People from Clans as far as the Mountains gather, including survivors from the Swan Clan, Dark's birth father among them. Dark is displeased at meeting his father, the one who had abandoned him to his death in the mountains, again. While the Clans assess the extent of the disaster which has wiped out much of the western Open Forest and a large part of the Deep Forest in the east, the Walker comes to camp, revealing in one of his moments of sanity and wisdom that the disaster is far worse than anyone yet imagines. His prediction is shown to be true when he reveals that the First Tree, the winter lights of the sky where the Clans' dead go on the death journey, has been destroyed by the Thunderstar. The disappearance of the First Tree is a bitter blow to the surviving Clans, but the Walker reveals that there is a way to bring it back, a ritual from the Old Time when the first demon was defeated by the World Spirit, assisted by the first men who had shot their arrows into the sky to help it in its battle. The Walker confirms that, should the Clans find four pieces representing each part of the Forest and shoot them into the sky, carried by the cries of the purest souls in the Forest, the First Tree would return. Before he leaves, the Walker warns Renn that Torak has been more badly affected than she realizes, as the part of the Forest within him was broken with the fall of the Thunderstar.

Torak, Renn and Wolf leave the Clans for the Deep Forest, convinced they will find a piece of the Forest in the Sacred Grove, where the oldest tree stands, while Dark finds two pieces at camp. One is found by appealing the Hidden People of the caves, who hand him a crystal and tell him he will find another "in the jaws of the wolf". The second is found having been unmarked by Pebble chewing on it. At the same, Dark discovers his father, who he has lingering animosity towards but who had been trying to make amends, and the other Swan Clan hunters stealing food. He learns that there is a new Leader among the Deep Forest Clans, a powerful figure who protected them from the Thunderstar and convinced them to renounce the old ways of the Clans. Suspecting who this new Leader might be, Dark leaves camp with Fin-Kedinn's blessing to find Torak and Renn.

In the Deep Forest, Torak and Renn come across the Red Deer Clan, who have become a shell of their former self and believe the Thunderstar was a sign of the World Spirit's displeasure with them. Those Clans whose lands had been spared by the Thunderstar had abandoned their ways and, calling themselves the 'Chosen Ones', followed a new leader who defended them against a new threat which had emerged in the wake of the disaster: Skin Takers. The Skin Takers, announcing their arrival with piercing cries, steal the death marks from the dead, and eat the brains of the dead. As they hear tales of the Skin Takers, Renn shares with Torak her suspicion that Naiginn had survived their confrontation in the Far North and is responsible for the turmoil in the Deep Forest. Soon, both are separately captured by the Chosen Ones and, while Renn manages to escape with help from a sceptic hunter, Torak is brought to the Leader, who reveals himself to be Naiginn. The ice demon reveals that, in addition to surviving their battle on the Edge of the World, he had discovered his mother had lied to him about his curse: he could free his demon nature from his mortal body by consuming souls, specifically the brains of still living beings. Naiginn had created the myth of the Skin Takers, faking their cries and convincing the Chosen Ones and the subdued Deep Forest Clans that only he could defeat them. Torak manages to escape from Naiginn when Renn and Wolf send the sacred horses towards him and, much as he had during the events of Oathbreaker, he rides one away. Reaching the Sacred Grove, Torak's spirit breaks when he discovers that the oldest trees in the Forest, the Great Yew and the Great Oak, have been destroyed by the Thunderstar.

Eager to feel it again, Torak spirit walks into the trees and finds the Forest stone needed for the rite while Renn and Dark, with help from the Hidden People, find the last one: a piece of the Thunderstar itself. Torak regains his body long enough to give Renn and Dark his piece before the Forest pulls him back in and, only by spirit walking into a bear is he capable of escaping the vastness of the trees' consciousness. Renn and Dark, as Mages, perform the rite but are attacked by Naiginn just as they are about to fire their arrows into the sky. Torak, in the bear, attacks Naiginn, allowing Renn and Dark to complete the rite. As the arrows shoot into the sky, Wolf leads the other packs of the Forest in a howl, carrying the arrows to the sky. Naiginn flees, his lies exposed to the rest of the Deep Forest Clans who abandon the new way he had preached to control them and return to their Clans. Returning to the Open Forest, Torak, Renn and Dark rejoin the Ravens and the other Clans as Fin-Kedinn has convinced them to clear the rubble from the Thunderstar's disaster and free the trapped Windriver, which the Clans relied on for salmon in the spring. After days of difficult work during which time other Clans join them, the First Tree finally reappears, restoring hope to the Forest.

=== Wolfbane ===
The story returns to Torak and Renn as they hunt Naiginn, a human (known as a Shadeless) who is bound to the spirit of a frost demon, marking him as a dangerous enemy since his appearance in Skin Taker. Naiginn consumes the souls of others to increase his power, and the most radiant soul he seeks is that of Wolf, Torak's loyal four-legged brother, bonded to him since the first book when Torak saved Wolf as a cub.

On learning that Naiginn intends to harm Wolf, Torak and Renn hurry to the den and find the pack under attack. Wolf pursues the retreating Naiginn; this marks a turning point in the plot and prompts Torak and Renn to track Wolf and confront Naiginn. Wolf runs to the Sea, getting stuck on an iceberg which breaks off and leaves him adrift at Sea.

Torak and Renn go to the Sea-eagle Clan, hoping they will be able to assist. Eventually, they are given a canoe to help find him. Torak decides to leave his medicine horn with Fin-Kedinn, his foster father, who insists he bring it for his own good. Eventually, Torak talks him into keeping it safe for him. Later, as Torak and Renn are about to leave, Renn sees a white elk at the edge of a forest. White elks are rare, and seeing one is a bad sign. After the elk vanishes, the mated pair sets off.

Meanwhile, Wolf finds a patch of land, but when he lands on it, it is revealed to be a 'mountainfish'. He has a little nap, and wakes to see the ravens from his pack coming for him. They leave, and Wolf waits for their return. While he waits, he sees the 'wolves of the Wet' stalking him as if he were prey. Meanwhile, Renn and Torak continue to travel across the Sea, and encounter land where they think they saw wolf tracks. However, they actually find some quicksand, and Renn begins to sink in it. Torak is able to pull her out, and they camp for the night on a stretch of shingle above the rocks.

Renn finds out that Torak does not have his medicine horn when she needs some earthblood. Then, he tries to take the black root which allows him to spirit walk from Renn's medicine pouch, but fails, before deciding to spirit walk in a creature from the sea, as they could find anything, and he wasn't allowed to spirit walk in a bird. Meanwhile, at the Sea-eagle Clan camp, Dark asks Kujai, an Elder's son, to help him make a finding charm.

== Development ==
In 1980, while Paver was attending Oxford University, she had the idea of writing a story about a young boy and a wolf cub. She scribbled down a few pages of a rough draft taking place in the 9th century, focusing on an orphaned boy with his wolf cub. Displeased with the rough draft, she locked the story away.

Fifteen years after writing the original rough draft, while Paver was hiking by herself in southern California, a large female black bear with two cubs walked onto the trail she was following. Paver was aware that black bears are at their most dangerous when they have cubs, and any sudden movement might cause the bear to attack. Paver began singing "Danny Boy" to the bear in an effort to show she meant no harm. The bear approached Paver, swaying its head from side to side and smelling her. She began backing up very slowly until the bear was out of sight, and she then fled the scene. Several years later, while looking through a pile of old notes, she stumbled upon the rough draft she had written in 1980. She felt the story was missing something, and her mind raced to the memory of her encounter with the bear, and the plot of Wolf Brother unfolded before her. Paver began researching the timeline of her story, and she traveled to northern Finland to research how the people in her book would have lived nearly six thousand years ago. After hours in the library and much travel, Paver began writing the book. Wolf Brother was published in September 2004, and shortly after the book's publication Paver began work on the next book in the series. Wolf Brother was not meant to be a series at first, but Paver said, "after writing my first draft, I knew one book could not hold this story."

=== Research ===
Paver researched extensively while developing the book. In addition to academic study, she travelled to north-eastern Finland, where she trekked with a field guide over 300 miles across the forests. To understand life in the New Stone Age, they used tools and clothing that would have been available 6000 years ago, slept in a traditional laavu shelter in a sleeping bag made of reindeer skin, and ate only foods that Stone Age hunter-gatherers would have. In addition, she spent time at a wolf reserve studying the wolves and observing their behavior, and also named the main character "Torak" after one of the wolves in the UK Wolf Conservation Trust.

Paver places the series in north-west Europe. She says about the fruit of her research, "I've tried hard to make Torak's world accurate, and I've been delighted that the stories have met with favor in archaeological circles. A few years ago, I was asked to open a special WOLF BROTHER display case at the Cambridge University Museum of Archaeology and Anthropology. The Museum had taken excerpts from the book, and exhibited them alongside real archaeological artifacts mentioned in the story, such as flint blades, red ochre, etc."

== Film rights ==
In 2004, 20th Century Fox purchased the rights to make feature films of the book series. The first book in the series, Wolf Brother, has been optioned from $250,000 against $1 million. The film series was going to be produced by Ridley Scott and Erin Upson. A script was in production, according to an answer to a fan letter. However, the project was put on hold. The project has since been revived as announced at a Superfan event in July 2012, when Paver revealed the books will be made into films for theater or television.

During a "Michelle Live" live stream on YouTube and twitch on 30 March 2020, Paver herself revealed that she has just completed a deal with Kindle Entertainment and Lionsgate and that a live action TV series will be made based on the series. Paver said "I've had more meetings with producers about Wolf Brother than I can remember but Anne Brogan and Melanie Stokes from Kindle Entertainment stood out from the very first time I met them. They knew the series inside out and – a big plus for me – their children were fans. Wolf Brother fans have extremely high expectations for a television series and Anne and Mel share the same burning desire to create a legendary series. I'm entrusting them with the lives of Torak, Renn and Wolf! I know they will be in safe hands."

== Sequels ==
On 18 March 2019, Paver announced in a live-streamed YouTube video that she was planning three new books set after Ghost Hunter. In the announcement she mentioned that she seriously started thinking about it during a visit to arctic Norway, but that it had been on her mind ever since finishing Ghost Hunter. The first sequel, Viper's Daughter, was published on 2 April 2020; the second, Skin Taker, on 1 April 2021; and the third, Wolfbane, on 26 April 2022. Paver's original editor Fiona Kennedy, and original illustrators Geoff Taylor and John Fordham returned to work on the sequels. Sir Ian McKellen also returned to voice the audiobooks, as he had for the original six books in the series.
