= Wolf Brother =

2004 fantasy novel by Michelle Paver

- UK cover of the book
- Author: Michelle Paver
- Illustrator: Geoff Taylor
- Cover artist: John Fordham
- Language: English
- Series: Chronicles of Ancient Darkness
- Genre: Children's adventure, fantasy novel
- Publisher: Orion Children's Books
- Publication date: 27 May 2004 (UK) 30 September 2004 (US)
- Publication place: United Kingdom
- Media type: Print (hardback and paperback), audio book (CD & cassette)
- Pages: 224 pp (first edition, hardback)
- ISBN: 1-84255-170-1 (first edition, hardback)
- OCLC: 56645545
- Followed by: Spirit Walker

Wolf Brother is the first book in the series Chronicles of Ancient Darkness written by Michelle Paver and illustrated by Geoff Taylor. Wolf Brother takes place six thousand years ago during the Middle Stone Age, and tells the story of twelve-year-old Torak, a boy who can talk to wolves. The book was published in 2004 by Orion Children's Books.

Most reviews were very positive, commenting on Paver's imagery, humour, and descriptive writings style. Most praised the author's attention to detail and depth of research. Paver travelled to the forests of Finland and Norway researching how people lived 6000 years ago, and she also spent time with wolves at the UK Wolf Conservation Trust. She also studied the raven population at the Tower of London.

Wolf Brother is followed by Spirit Walker (2005), Soul Eater (2006), Outcast (2007), Oath Breaker (2008), Ghost Hunter (2009), Viper's Daughter (2020), Skin Taker (2021), and Wolfbane (2022).

== Plot summary ==
In pre-agricultural Europe, the people of the Forest live in clans, each represented by a particular animal or life form. These clans live a hunter-gatherer existence with a shamanic belief system. Torak and his father, of the Wolf Clan, live in seclusion, far away from any other Clan. Torak's father is killed by a bear which has been possessed by a demon. Before he dies, he tells Torak to swear an oath to find the Mountain of the World Spirit, in order to kill the bear. His father tells him that his ‘guide’ will find him and help him on his quest. Torak reluctantly leaves his father as the bear comes back to kill him.

Torak heads north and soon encounters an orphaned Wolf Cub. He discovers that he can communicate with the Cub. He realises the Cub is the guide, and the two become close. Torak holds a naming ritual for the Cub and names him Wolf. A few days later Torak and Wolf are captured by three members of the Raven Clan, including a girl named Renn, who accuse Torak of stealing one of their roebuck. They are taken to the Raven camp so Torak's fate can be decided by Fin-Kedinn, the Raven Clan leader. To regain his freedom, Torak fights Hord, Renn's older brother.

He wins by temporarily blinding Hord with steam; this action, together with a dog whistle which Torak has made to summon Wolf, leads Fin-Kedinn and the Raven mage to see Torak as the "Listener" of a prophecy. The prophecy states that the Listener, who "talks with silence and fights with air", will offer his heart's blood to the World Spirit and thereby kill the demon-bear. Many Ravens now believe that Torak must be sacrificed. Torak manages to escape his imprisonment; he is unexpectedly joined by Renn, who has also brought Wolf. Though adversarial at first, Torak and Renn develop a mutual respect, and eventually become friends.

Before they get to the Mountain of the World Spirit, the trio must locate the three pieces of the Nanuak; objects the World Spirit has imbued with power. The Nanuak pieces are found in a river, a cave, and in the hand of a dead man.

Nearly at their destination, Renn and Torak are recaptured by the Ravens. Hord argues that he should take Torak to the Mountain and sacrifice him there, to appease the World Spirit. Fin-Kedinn however releases Torak, believing him to be the one who should go to the Mountain. Fin-Kedinn also reveals that Torak's Fa was killed because he was the foremost enemy of a group of rogue mages, the Soul Eaters, who turned to evil in their determination to rule the clans. Fin-Keddin also tells Torak that it is his destiny to one day face down and destroy the Soul Eaters.

Torak and Wolf climb the mountain, followed by the bear. Torak is unexpectedly attacked by Hord, who wants to kill Torak. Torak realises that the "heart's blood" of the prophecy means Wolf, and as Wolf carries the Nanuak to the summit, Hord and the bear are engulfed by an ensuing avalanche. Hord and the Bear both die. Torak is knocked unconscious by the avalanche. Torak wakes up hours later and looks for Wolf, but he only hears his howl in the distance, along with the howls of other wolves. Torak shouts to Wolf in human language, promising that he will one day return for him, before turning to head back into the forest.

== Reception ==
Wolf Brother was generally well received by critics.

Writing for The Guardian, Claire Armitstead called Wolf Brother a "rattling read" and noted that it "has a nicely detailed setting and covers enough reader interests – friendship, adventure – even pets." Publishers Weekly praised the book, calling it "part riveting nature story, part rite of passage saga. Torak's coming-of-age tale will keep the pages turning."

Almost all reviews praised the book's themes of courage, bravery and friendship. Many critics also commented on the story's oddest aspect of telling a few chapters of the book from the point of view of a wolf. Paver has also stated it was one of the hardest aspects of opticals.

== Translations ==
The book has been translated into Chinese, Spanish, French, Czech, Slovak, Polish, Vietnamese, Bulgarian, Japanese, German, Dutch, Swedish, Portuguese, Italian, Hebrew, Finnish, Norwegian, Russian, Serbian, Spanish, Hungarian, Latvian, Danish, Indonesian, Romanian, Icelandic, Turkish, Slovenian and Faroese (Faroe Islands).

== Sequels ==
When Paver was writing the first draft of Wolf Brother in 2004, she did not originally plan it to be a series of books. As she wrote the book she quickly realised the story would not be able to be contained within the pages of only one book. The next book in the series, Spirit Walker, was published on 28 June 2006.

== Adaptations ==
Wolf Brother was adapted in ten episodes for BBC Radio by Ivan Jones in 2007.

It also has made into an audio read version narrated by Ian McKellen.
