= An Ideal Husband (1999 film) =

1999 film by Oliver Parker

- UK Theatrical release poster
- Directed by: Oliver Parker
- Written by: Oliver Parker
- Based on: An Ideal Husband; 1895 play by Oscar Wilde
- Produced by: Barnaby Thompson; Bruce Davey; Uri Fruchtmann
- Starring: Cate Blanchett; Minnie Driver; Rupert Everett; Julianne Moore; Jeremy Northam; John Wood; Lindsay Duncan; Peter Vaughan; Jeroen Krabbé
- Cinematography: David Johnson
- Edited by: Guy Bensley
- Music by: Charlie Mole
- Production company: Icon Productions
- Distributed by: Pathé Distribution (United Kingdom); Icon Entertainment International (Internationally)
- Release date: 16 April 1999 (United Kingdom)
- Running time: 97 minutes
- Country: United Kingdom
- Language: English
- Budget: £6.3 million
- Box office: £19.4 million ($31.3 million)

An Ideal Husband is a 1999 British film based on the 1895 play An Ideal Husband by Oscar Wilde. The film stars Cate Blanchett, Minnie Driver, Rupert Everett, Julianne Moore and Jeremy Northam. It was directed by Oliver Parker.

It was selected as the 1999 Cannes Film Festival's closing film.

== Plot ==
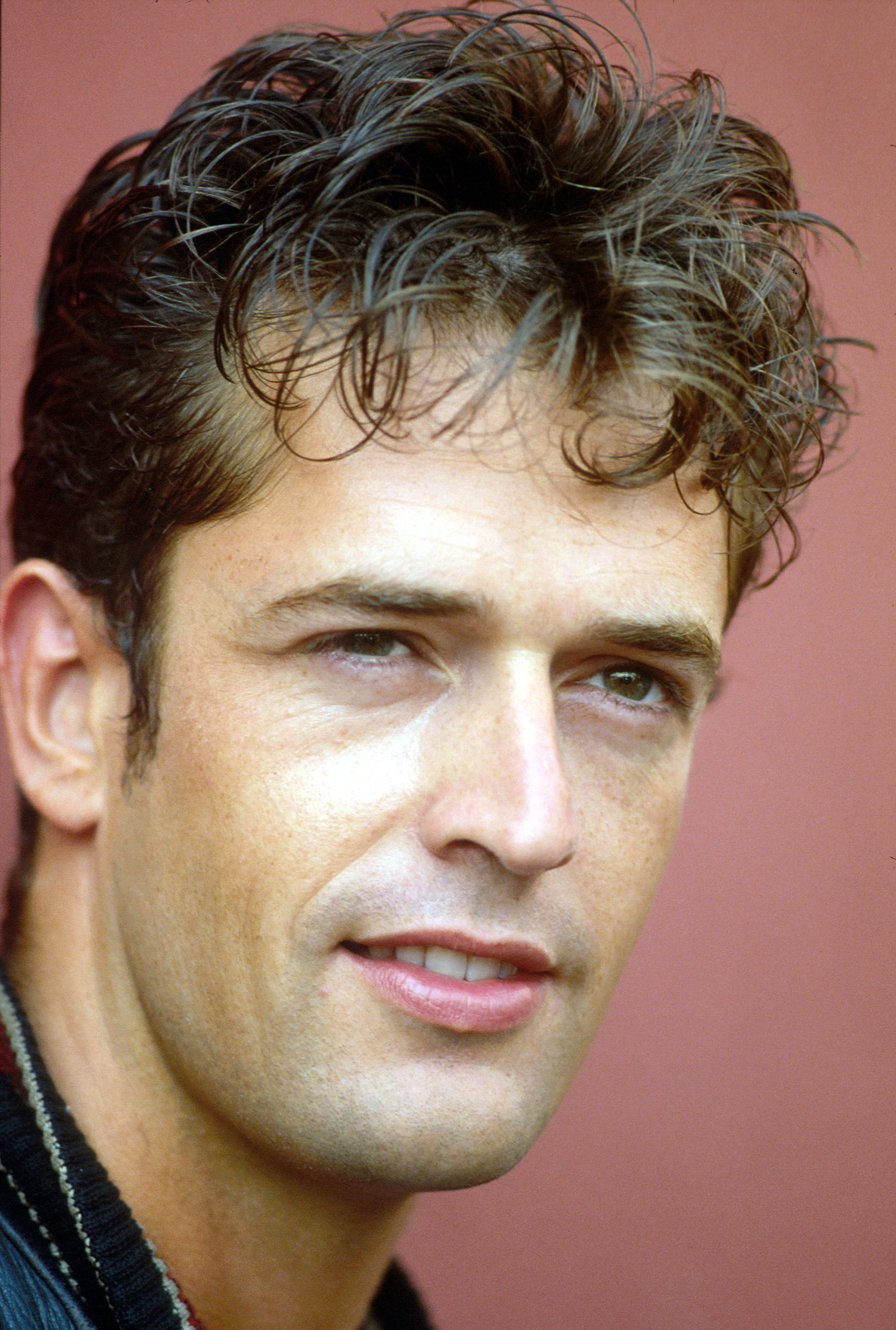
Rupert Everett plays Lord Arthur Goring, to whom Laura Chevely was engaged before her marriage and who urges Robert to let his wife know about his own past indiscretion, even if it lowers her regard for her husband.

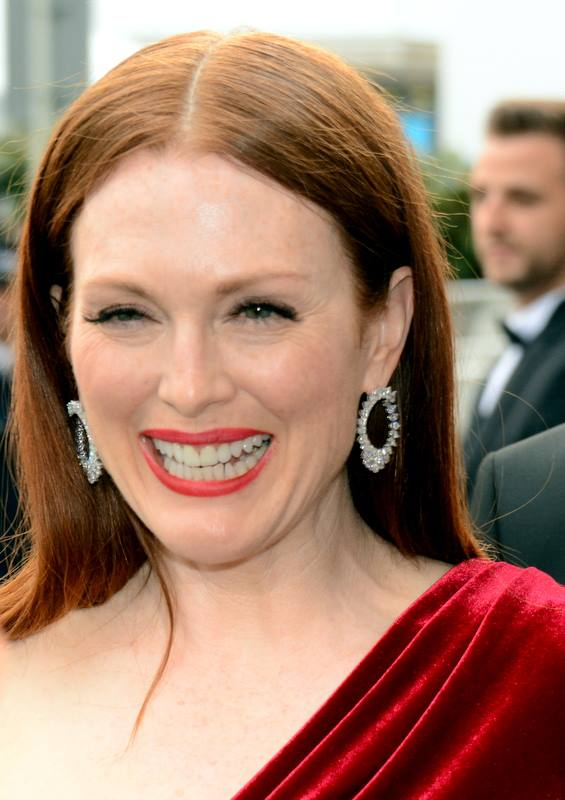
Julianne Moore plays Mrs. Laura Cheveley, who tries to extort Sir Robert into supporting a canal scheme using incriminating letters and who makes a wager with Lord Goring to test his faith in Robert, with marriage as the forfeit.

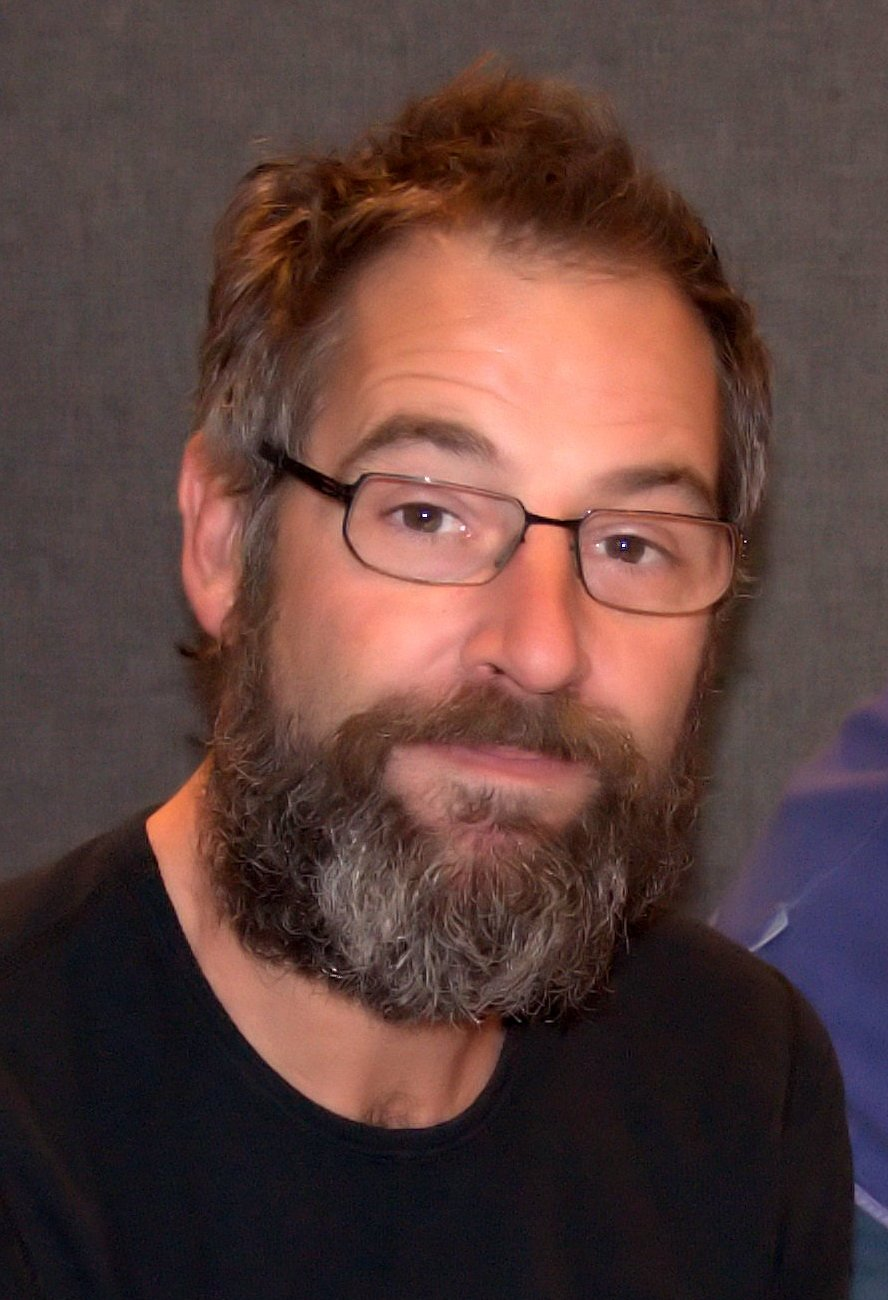
Jeremy Northam plays Sir Robert Chiltern, member of Parliament, who many years earlier wrote an incriminating letter that disclosed a cabinet secret—insider knowledge regarding the Suez Canal—to establish his fortune and career.

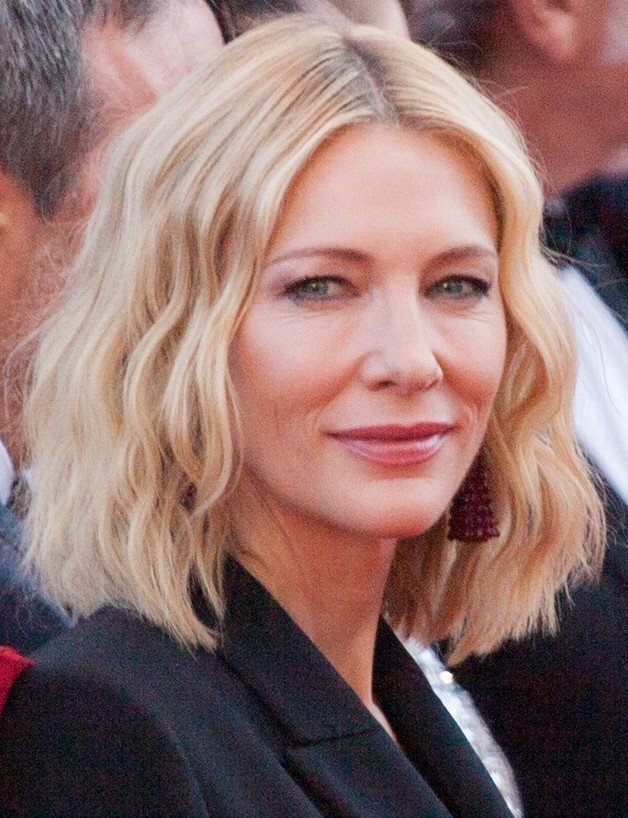
Cate Blanchett plays Lady Gertrude Chiltern, who idolizes her husband and ironically expresses that a person who has performed a dishonorable act should be shunned.

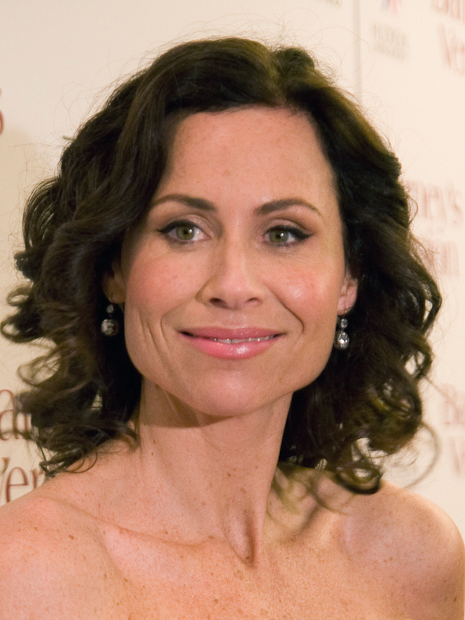
Minnie Driver plays Miss Mabel Chiltern, who along with Lord Goring, convinces Robert that Gertrude wrote her incriminating letter to him rather than having improperly appealed to Lord Goring.

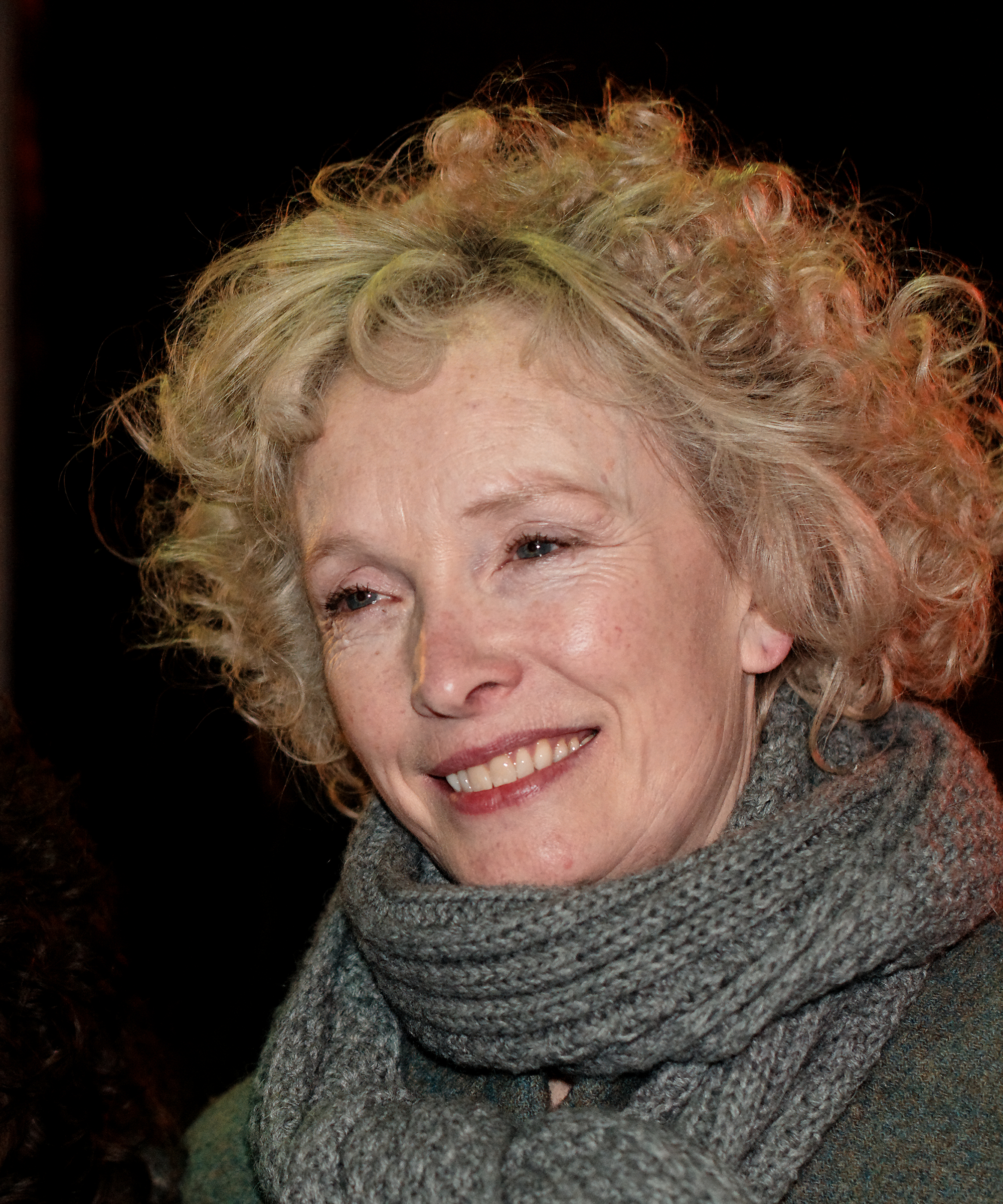
Lindsay Duncan plays malicious Lady Markby, who—aware of the animosity between them—reintroduces Mrs. Laura Cheveley to Lady Gertrude Chiltern, former schoolmates.

Before the turn of the 20th century, at a fashionable park outing, malicious Lady Markby reintroduces Mrs. Laura Cheveley to Lady Gertrude Chiltern, who knew each other at school. Laura fishes for an invitation to meet Gertrude’s husband, Sir Robert Chiltern, but Gertrude does not extend an invitation until Lady Markby suggests bringing her to that evening’s ball, making refusal ungracious.

At the Chiltern’s lavish party, Laura tries to blackmail Sir Robert, a member of Parliament, into supporting a bill to provide government financing for what he considers to be a new fraudulent canal scheme. Laura has incriminating letters Robert wrote many years earlier that disclosed a cabinet secret—insider knowledge regarding the Suez Canal—to establish his fortune and career. He initially refuses but gives in to save his reputation. Before leaving the party, Laura tells Gertrude that her husband will support the canal scheme, which surprises the politician's wife. At the party, Laura reencounters Lord Arthur Goring, to whom she was engaged before her marriage, and with whom she is eager to reestablish a romantic relationship. Arthur reminds her that she ended their engagement for an affair with rich Baron Arnheim. Confronted by his wife about his change of position, Robert writes a letter to Laura, informing her that he will speak against the bill.

The next morning, Robert reveals Laura’s blackmail attempt to Arthur, who urges him to let his wife know about his own past indiscretion, even if it lowers her regard for her husband. Robert refuses to tell her the truth and asks Arthur to speak to Gertrude to soften the blow. Lady Markby brings Laura to tea at the Chilterns; after Lady Markby leaves, Gertrude asks Laura to leave her house and never return. Gertrude says that she has despised Laura since their school days and that a person who has performed a dishonorable act should be shunned. Laura retaliates by telling Gertrude how her husband made his fortune and that she will disclose his dishonesty if Robert does not support the canal bill. Robert overhears and orders Laura to leave. Repelled by his past behavior, Gertrude suggests he resign his position, and Robert says that no one could live up to the ideal image she had of him.

That evening, Gertrude sends an unsigned note to Arthur saying she will come to him and asking for his help. Before Gertrude’s arrival, Robert visits Arthur, asking for Arthur’s help. While Arthur is in the drawing room with Robert, the butler mixes up his instructions to admit discreetly only an unnamed lady and admits Laura, who arrives unexpectedly, instead of Gertrude, who is mistakenly turned away. When Robert discovers Laura in Arthur’s library, he accuses Arthur of scheming with her and departs angrily. Arthur attempts to seduce Laura, asking her to show her good faith by returning Robert’s letter.

Laura is not won over and instead makes a wager with Arthur. If Robert lives up to Arthur’s faith that Robert will not endorse the fraudulent scheme, she will return the incriminating letter to Arthur. If Robert endorses the scheme to save his reputation, Arthur will marry Laura. As she leaves, Laura steals Gertrude's note, planning to use it to make Robert believe that his wife is having an affair with Arthur. That night, Laura, Gertrude, and Arthur watch in the House of Commons as Robert denounces the canal scheme. Laura returns the letter to Arthur but retains the letter from Gertrude that she stole from Arthur’s library, informing Arthur that she has sent it to Robert to destroy his marriage.

The next day, Arthur tells Gertrude of Laura's intentions to use the note. Robert arrives, but Gertrude, Robert's sister Mabel, and Arthur convince him that Gertrude wrote the letter to Robert. Now willing to give up his position in society and live a private life with Gertrude, Robert is offered an important Cabinet position by Lord Caversham, Arthur's father, almost declining it out of love and penitence until Arthur convinces Gertrude to change his mind. Soon afterwards Arthur proposes to Mabel, but Robert refuses to give his permission for the marriage, assuming Arthur is still involved with Laura after finding her at Arthur's house. However, Gertrude reveals that Arthur had been expecting her, not Laura, thus the wedding goes ahead after all.

== Cast ==
- Cate Blanchett as Lady Gertrude Chiltern
- Minnie Driver as Miss Mabel Chiltern
- Rupert Everett as Lord Arthur Goring
- Julianne Moore as Mrs. Laura Cheveley
- Jeremy Northam as Sir Robert Chiltern
- John Wood as Lord Caversham
- Peter Vaughan as Phipps
- Ben Pullen as Tommy Trafford
- Marsha Fitzalan as Countess
- Lindsay Duncan as Lady Markby
- Neville Phillips as Mason
- Nickolas Grace as Vicomte de Nanjac
- Simon Russell Beale as Sir Edward
- Anna Patrick as Miss Danvers
- Delia Lindsay as Lady Basildon
- Doug Bradley as Brackpool

== Differences from play ==
The plot of the film differs from the original Wilde play in a number of key respects. The episode of Mrs. Cheveley's lost brooch (that can also be used as a bracelet) was removed, and the twists at the end are made more complex by the introduction of a bet between Lord Goring and Mrs Cheveley.

== Release ==
The film was released in the United Kingdom and Ireland on 16 April 1999 by Pathé on 182 screens and grossed £492,269 in its opening weekend, ranking third. Miramax Films picked up distribution rights to the film from Icon in North America, and through Miramax International in Spain and Italy.

== Reception ==
The film received positive reviews from critics, including Roger Ebert, who awarded it 3 out of 4 stars. Owen Gleiberman of Entertainment Weekly wrote the film is "an enjoyable, minor, lustrously shot revamping of Oscar Wilde’s play about the perpetually interlocked manners of love and deception…Everett gets all the good lines, but he’s daring enough to deliver them gently, with a knowing touch of rue."

Stephen Holden of The New York Times also reviewed the film positively, writing, "If An Ideal Husband transports us back to a world that seems more refined than ours, it also flatters us, as Wilde flattered the play's fin de siècle audience, by arriving at a plain-as-the-nose-on-your-face piece of wisdom that after all the preceding badinage may seem more profound than it really is. Hollywood couldn't come up with a tidier feel-good ending -- one that gets everybody off the hook -- than An Ideal Husband's concluding moral: Nobody's perfect."

On Rotten Tomatoes, An Ideal Husband has an approval rating of 85% based on 67 critics’ reviews. The site’s critics consensus reads, "Brevity is the soul of wit, eh? This adaptation gets to the nitty gritty of Wilde's stage piece and plays on eternal human foibles." Metacritic, which uses a weighted average, assigned the film a score of 67 out of 100, based on 25 critics, indicating "generally favorable" reviews.

=== Box office ===
The film grossed £2.9 million ($4.8 million) in the United Kingdom and $18.5 million (£11.2 million) in the United States and Canada. Worldwide, the film grossed $31.3 million (£19.4 million).

=== Awards ===
Julianne Moore was nominated for the Chicago Film Critics Award for Best Supporting Actress, a Golden Globe Award for Best Actress in a Comedy or Musical, and a Golden Satellite Award for Best Actress in a Comedy or Musical. Moore won the National Board of Review Award for Best Supporting Actress for her performances in Magnolia, A Map of The World, and An Ideal Husband.

Everett received a Golden Globe nomination for Best Actor – Motion Picture Musical or Comedy.

The film was nominated for BAFTA awards in three categories: Oliver Parker for Best Adapted Screenplay, Caroline Harris for Best Costume Design, and Peter King for Best Make-up and Hair.
