= The Winslow Boy (1999 film) =

- Theatrical release poster
- Directed by: David Mamet
- Screenplay by: David Mamet
- Based on: The Winslow Boy by Terence Rattigan
- Produced by: Sarah Green
- Starring: Nigel Hawthorne; Jeremy Northam; Rebecca Pidgeon; Gemma Jones
- Cinematography: Benoît Delhomme
- Edited by: Barbara Tulliver
- Music by: Alaric Jans
- Production company: Green/Renzi Productions
- Distributed by: Sony Pictures Classics
- Release date: 16 April 1999
- Running time: 104 minutes
- Country: United States
- Language: English
- Box office: $3,957,934

The Winslow Boy is a 1999 American period drama film directed by David Mamet and starring Nigel Hawthorne, Rebecca Pidgeon, Jeremy Northam and Gemma Jones. Set in London before World War I, it depicts a British family defending at all costs the honour of its naval cadet young son against a false charge of theft. The screenplay was adapted by Mamet based on Terence Rattigan's 1946 dramatic play The Winslow Boy.

It was screened in the Un Certain Regard section at the 1999 Cannes Film Festival.

== Plot ==
It is nearing Christmas 1911 and Arthur Winslow, a London banker, is making final preparations for a dinner to seal the engagement between his daughter Catherine, an outspoken supporter of the cause of women's suffrage, and Captain John Watherstone. The family and guests are toasting the forthcoming marriage when Arthur discovers that his youngest son Ronnie, a 13-year-old cadet at the Royal Naval College, Osborne, has returned home earlier than expected. Ronnie had been accused of the theft of a postal order. An internal enquiry, conducted without notice to his family and without benefit of representation, had found him guilty and Mr. Winslow is "requested to withdraw" his son from the college (the formula of the day for expulsion). Ronnie proclaims his innocence and his father believes him—enough so that he demands an apology from the college. When the college refuses to reinstate Ronnie, Arthur decides to take the matter to court. With the help of his daughter and Desmond Curry, a solicitor and friend of the family, Mr. Winslow decides to hire the most highly sought after barrister in England at the time, Sir Robert Morton, known also to be a shrewd opposition Member of Parliament.

The government is unwilling to allow the case to proceed. The Naval College is a representative of the Admiralty and the Crown, and as such British law presumes they are infallible and above question; their judgment can be legally questioned only with the permission of the Attorney General. However, after heated debates in the House of Commons, the government yields, and the case does come to court.

Catherine had expected Sir Robert to decline the case, or at best to treat it as a political tool; instead, he is coolly matter-of-fact about having been persuaded of Ronnie's innocence by his responses to questioning (in fact, a form of cross-examination, to see how Ronnie would hold up in court) in the presence of his family. Catherine is not enthusiastic about Morton, whom she considers cold and heartless. Catherine is also disturbed by Sir Robert's establishment views: he is a conservative opponent of women's suffrage. "He always speaks out against what is right," she observes to her father, though she admires his legal skills. Morton, for his part, obviously is quite taken with Catherine from the moment he meets her in his offices; later, he stares at her as she arrives at the House of Commons and as she watches the proceedings from the ladies' gallery.

In the meantime, the case creates media hysteria and puts a heavy toll on the Winslow family – their funds are rapidly depleted in order to cover legal expenses. Mr. Winslow's physical health deteriorates under the strain, and the happiness of the Winslows' home is destroyed. Arthur's wife, Grace, begins to wonder if the real issue is justice or a father's stubborn and foolish pride. Forced to make economic sacrifices, Grace Winslow is unwilling to take the drastic measure of dismissing Violet, who has been the family's maid for over twenty years. The eldest son, Dickie Winslow, has to leave Oxford University due to the lack of money, destroying his chance for a career in the Civil Service. Instead, he is compelled to find employment in his father's bank. Catherine's marriage settlement is also gone. Her fiancé John Watherstone breaks off their engagement under pressure from his father (an Army Colonel) because of the publicity surrounding the case, forcing her to consider a sincere and well-intentioned offer of marriage from Desmond, whom she does not love. Sir Robert has also declined appointment as Lord Chief Justice, rather than drop the case. The least affected is Ronnie, who has been transferred to a new school at which he is doing well.

At trial, Sir Robert, working together with Desmond Curry and his firm, is able to discredit much of the supposed evidence. The Admiralty, embarrassed and no longer confident of Ronnie's guilt, abruptly withdraws all charges against him, proclaiming the boy entirely innocent.

When their resounding victory arrives, not a single member of the Winslow family is present in court. It is Violet, the maid, who tells Mr. Winslow and Catherine what has happened. Shortly afterwards, Sir Robert appears in the Winslows’ home to explain the good news. The film ends with a suggestion that romance might yet blossom between Sir Robert and Catherine, who acknowledges that she had misjudged him all along.

== Cast ==
- Nigel Hawthorne - Arthur Winslow
- Rebecca Pidgeon - Catherine Winslow
- Jeremy Northam - Sir Robert Morton
- Guy Edwards - Ronnie Winslow
- Gemma Jones - Grace Winslow
- Matthew Pidgeon - Dickie Winslow
- Aden Gillett - John Watherstone
- Colin Stinton - Desmond Curry
- Sarah Flind - Violet
- Neil North - First Lord

== Production ==
Shot in London, the film was directed by David Mamet who originally had thought of making a theatrical production of Rattigan's dramatic play, which had been previously filmed in 1948. After failing to find backers for the project, Mamet decided to adapt the play for the big screen. It was produced by Sarah Green with Sally French, Michael Barker and Tom Bernard as associate producers. The screenplay was adapted by Mamet based on Rattigan's play. The music score was by Alaric Jans and the cinematography by Benoît Delhomme.

Neil North who played the title role in the 1948 version also appears in this version (as the First Lord of the Admiralty). In the audio commentary for the DVD release, Mamet says he had already cast North in the film before he was told that North also appeared in the 1948 version.

In the DVD commentary, Jeremy Northam claims that film director Mike Newell originated the role of Ronnie Winslow in the original stage production. However, this is mistaken; Northam has confused another actor who is also named Michael Newell, who became a real-estate agent. Mike Newell (the director) was born in 1942, and since the play premiered in 1946, it is not possible for a four-year-old to have played that role. Rebecca Pidgeon, who plays Catherine, is married to playwright and director David Mamet. Matthew Pidgeon, who plays Dickie Winslow (Catherine's brother), is Rebecca Pidgeon's real-life brother.

== Awards ==
- Winner Best British Performance (Jeremy Northam) - Edinburgh International Film Festival
- Winner British Actor of the Year (Jeremy Northam) -The London Film Critics' Circle

== DVD release ==
The film was released on DVD in the United States in February 2000. The special features include an audio commentary by director/screenwriter David Mamet and cast members, Jeremy Northam, Nigel Hawthorne and Rebecca Pidgeon. The DVD also includes theatrical trailers for The Winslow Boy and The Spanish Prisoner. There is a short "making of" feature.
