= List of awards and nominations received by Jessie Buckley =

Jessie Buckley awards and nominations
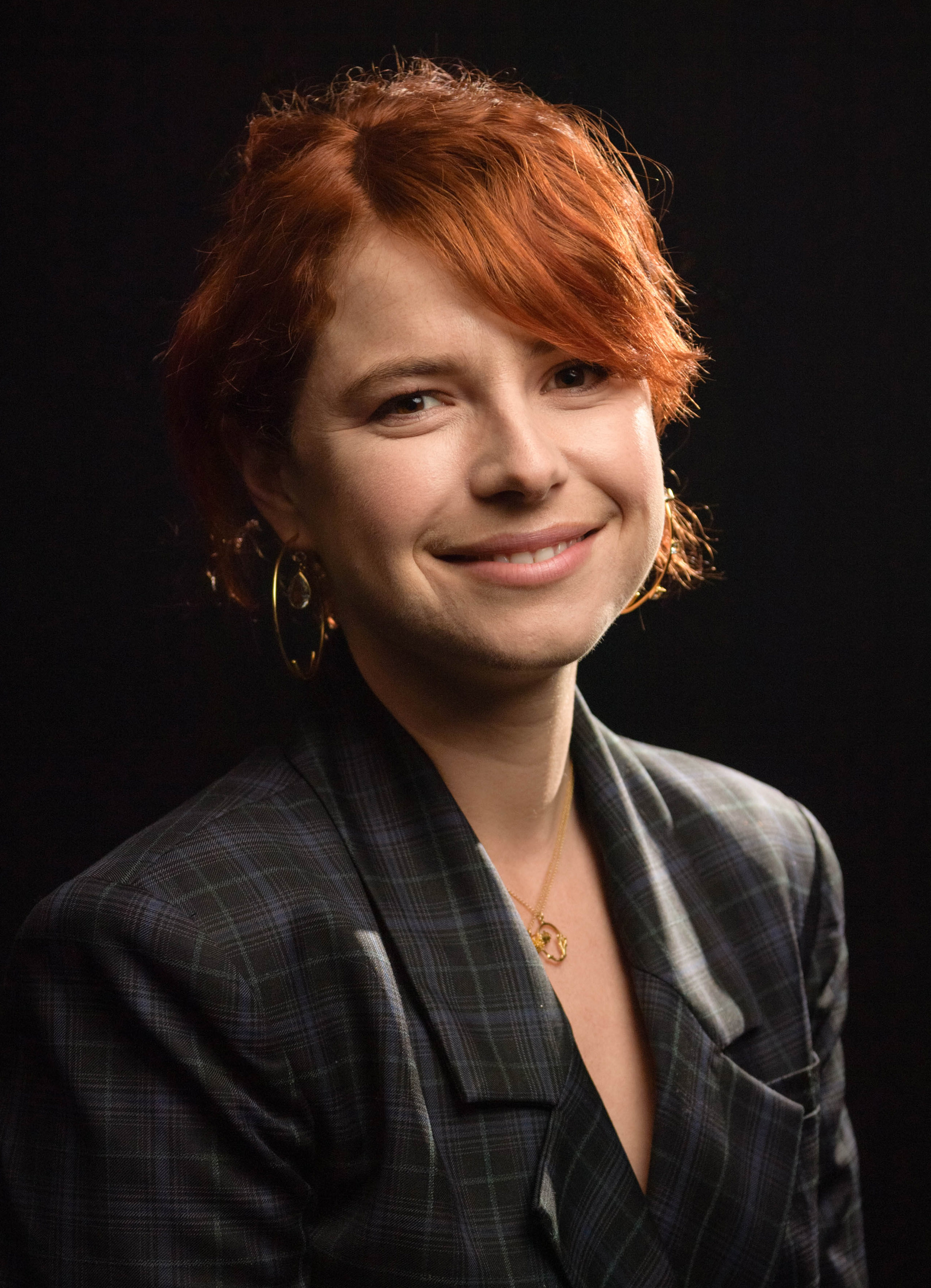
- Buckley in 2019
Awards and nominations
Award	Wins	Nominations
Academy Awards	1	2
Actor Awards	1	3
BAFTA Awards	2	5
Critics' Choice Awards	1	5
Golden Globe Awards	1	1
Laurence Olivier Awards	1	1

Totals (Note: Certain award groups do not simply award one winner. They acknowledge several different recipients, have runners-up, and have third place. Since this is a specific recognition and is different from losing an award, runner-up mentions are considered wins in this award tally. For simplification and to avoid errors, each award in this list has been presumed to have had a prior nomination.)
- Wins: 78
- Nominations: 169

The following is a list of awards and nominations received by Irish actress and singer Jessie Buckley.

Buckley made her film debut with the lead role in Beast (2017), for which she won the British Independent Film Award for Most Promising Newcomer and was nominated for the British Independent Film Award for Best Actress. A year later, she gained recognition for her performance as an aspiring country singer and single mother in Wild Rose (2018), and was nominated for the BAFTA Award for Best Actress in a Leading Role.

In 2021, Buckley received critical acclaim for her supporting performance in Maggie Gyllenhaal's psychological drama The Lost Daughter (2021), in which she played the younger version of an unsatisfied mother. For her performance, she was nominated for the Academy Award for Best Supporting Actress and the BAFTA Award for Best Actress in a Supporting Role. The following year, her performance as a Mennonite in Sarah Polley's Women Talking (2022) also garnered acclaim, earning her a nomination for the Critics' Choice Movie Award for Best Supporting Actress.

For television, Buckley played the mad nurse Oraetta Mayflower in the fourth season of FX's American black comedy crime drama Fargo (2020). For her performance, she was nominated for the Satellite Award for Best Supporting Actress – Series, Miniseries or Television Film.

Buckley has also had a career in theatre, having starred as Sally Bowles in a 2021 West End revival of Cabaret. Buckley received rave reviews and won the Laurence Olivier Award for Best Actress in a Musical and the Critics' Circle Theatre Award for Best Actress.

In 2025, Buckley starred as Shakespeare's wife in Chloé Zhao's historical drama film Hamnet (2025). Her performance received widespread acclaim, earning her many accolades, including the Golden Globe Award for Best Actress in a Motion Picture – Drama, the Critics' Choice Award for Best Actress, the BAFTA Award for Best Actress in a Leading Role, the Actor Award for Outstanding Performance by a Female Actor in a Leading Role, and the Academy Award for Best Actress, becoming the first Irish actress to win each award.

== Major associations ==
=== Academy Awards ===
Year	Category	Nominated work	Result	Ref.
2022	Best Supporting Actress	The Lost Daughter	Nominated	
2026	Best Actress	Hamnet	Won	

=== Actor Awards ===
Year	Category	Nominated work	Result	Ref.
2023	Outstanding Cast in a Motion Picture	Women Talking	Nominated (Note: Shared with the cast.)	
2026	Outstanding Cast in a Motion Picture	Hamnet	Nominated	
2026	Outstanding Female Actor in a Leading Role	Hamnet	Won	

=== BAFTA Awards ===
Year	Category	Nominated work	Result	Ref.
British Academy Film Awards
2019	Rising Star	—N/a	Nominated	
2020	Best Actress in a Leading Role	Wild Rose	Nominated	
2022	Best Actress in a Supporting Role	The Lost Daughter	Nominated	
2026	Best Actress in a Leading Role	Hamnet	Won	
British Academy Scotland Awards
2019	Best Actress	Wild Rose	Won	

=== Critics' Choice Awards ===
Year	Category	Nominated work	Result	Ref.
Critics' Choice Movie Awards
2023	Best Supporting Actress	Women Talking	Nominated	
2023	Best Acting Ensemble	Women Talking	Nominated	
2026	Best Actress	Hamnet	Won	
Critics' Choice Super Awards
2023	Best Actress in a Horror Movie	Men	Nominated	
2026	Best Actress in a Horror Movie	The Bride!	Nominated	

=== Golden Globe Awards ===
Year	Category	Nominated work	Result	Ref.
2026	Best Actress in a Motion Picture – Drama	Hamnet	Won	

=== Laurence Olivier Awards ===
Year	Category	Nominated work	Result	Ref.
2022	Best Actress in a Musical	Cabaret	Won	

== Other awards ==
=== British Independent Film Awards ===
Year	Category	Nominated work	Result	Ref.
2018	Most Promising Newcomer	Beast	Won	
2018	Best Actress	Beast	Nominated	
2019	Best Actress	Wild Rose	Nominated	
2022	Best Joint Lead Performance	Men	Nominated (Note: Shared with Rory Kinnear.)	

=== Cannes Film Festival ===
Year	Category	Nominated work	Result	Ref.
2021	Trophée Chopard	—N/a	Honored	

=== Gotham Awards ===
Year	Category	Nominated work	Result	Ref.
Film
2020	Best Actress	I'm Thinking of Ending Things	Nominated	
2021	Outstanding Supporting Performance	The Lost Daughter	Nominated	
2022	Outstanding Supporting Performance	Women Talking	Nominated	
2025	Outstanding Lead Performance	Hamnet	Nominated	

=== Independent Spirit Awards ===
Year	Category	Nominated work	Result	Ref.
2021	Best Supporting Female	The Lost Daughter	Nominated	
2022	Robert Altman Award	Women Talking	Won	

=== Irish Film & Television Awards ===
Year	Category	Nominated work	Result	Ref.
2018	Rising Star	—N/a	Nominated	
2018	Best Supporting Actress – TV Drama	Taboo	Nominated	
2020	Best Supporting Actress – TV Drama	Chernobyl	Won	
2020	Best Lead Actress – TV Drama	The Woman in White	Nominated	
2020	Best Lead Actress – Film	Wild Rose	Won	
2021	Best Lead Actress – Film	I'm Thinking of Ending Things	Nominated	
2022	Best Supporting Actress – Film	The Lost Daughter	Won	
2023	Best Supporting Actress – Film	Women Talking	Nominated	
2024	Best Lead Actress – Film	Fingernails	Nominated	
2025	Best Lead Actress – Film	Wicked Little Letters	Nominated	
2026	Best Lead Actress – Film	Hamnet	Won	

=== National Board of Review ===
Year	Category	Nominated work	Result	Ref.
2022	Best Cast	Women Talking	Won	

=== Satellite Awards ===
Year	Category	Nominated work	Result	Ref.
2021	Best Supporting Actress – Series, Miniseries or Television Film	Fargo	Nominated	
2026	Best Actress – Motion Picture Drama	Hamnet	Won	

== Other associations ==
Award	Year	Category	Nominated work	Result	Ref.
AACTA International Awards	2026	Best Actress	Hamnet	Nominated	
Alliance of Women Film Journalists	2022	Best Actress in a Supporting Role	The Lost Daughter	Nominated	
Alliance of Women Film Journalists	2023	Best Actress in a Supporting Role	Women Talking	Nominated	
Alliance of Women Film Journalists	2023	Best Ensemble Cast & Casting Director	Women Talking	Won	
Alliance of Women Film Journalists	2026	Best Actress	Hamnet	Won	
Alliance of Women Film Journalists	2026	Best Ensemble Cast & Casting Director	Hamnet	Nominated	
Astra Film Awards	2020	Breakthrough Performance – Actress	Wild Rose	Honored	
Astra Film Awards	2026	Best Actress - Drama	Hamnet	Won	
Astra TV Awards	2021	Best Supporting Actress in a Limited Series, Anthology Series, or Television Movie	Fargo	Nominated	
Atlanta Film Critics Circle	2025	Best Lead Actress	Hamnet	Won	
Austin Film Critics Association	2025	Best Actress	Hamnet	Nominated	
Boston Society of Film Critics	2021	Best Supporting Actress	The Lost Daughter	Won	
Boston Society of Film Critics	2022	Best Ensemble	Women Talking	Won (Note: Tied with Jackass Forever.)	
Chicago Film Critics Association	2020	Best Actress	I'm Thinking of Ending Things	Nominated	
Chicago Film Critics Association	2021	Best Supporting Actress	The Lost Daughter	Nominated	
Chicago Film Critics Association	2025	Best Actress	Hamnet	Nominated	
Chicago Indie Critics	2026	Best Actress	Hamnet	Won	
Columbus Film Critics Association	2026	Best Lead Performance	Hamnet	Runner-up	
Critics Association Of Central Florida	2026	Best Actress	Hamnet	Won	
Critics' Circle Theatre Award	2022	Best Actress	Cabaret	Won	
Dallas–Fort Worth Film Critics Association	2022	Best Supporting Actress	Women Talking	4th place	
Dallas–Fort Worth Film Critics Association	2025	Best Actress	Hamnet	2nd place	
Denver Film Critics Society	2026	Best Actress	Hamnet	Won	
Detroit Film Critics Society	2019	Breakthrough Performance	Wild Rose	Nominated	
Detroit Film Critics Society	2019	Breakthrough Performance	Judy	Nominated	
DiscussingFilm Critic Awards	2026	Best Actress	Hamnet	Won	
Dorian Awards	2026	Film Performance of the Year	Hamnet	Nominated	
Dublin Film Critics' Circle	2019	Best Actress	Wild Rose	5th place	
Dublin Film Critics' Circle	2020	Best Actress	I'm Thinking of Ending Things	Won	
Dublin International Film Festival	2019	Best Actress	Wild Rose	Won	
Evening Standard British Film Awards	2018	Best Actress	Beast	Nominated	
Evening Standard Theatre Awards	2022	Best Musical Performance	Cabaret	Nominated	
Fangoria Chainsaw Awards	2026	Best Lead Performance	The Bride!	Nominated	
Florida Film Critics Circle	2022	Best Supporting Actress	Women Talking	Won (Note: Tied with Nina Hoss for Tár.)	
Florida Film Critics Circle	2025	Best Actress	Hamnet	Nominated	
Georgia Film Critics Association	2025	Best Actress	Hamnet	Won	
Greater Western New York Film Critics Association	2021	Best Supporting Actress	The Lost Daughter	Nominated	
Greater Western New York Film Critics Association	2026	Best Actress	Hamnet	Nominated	
Guild of Music Supervisors Awards	2020	Best Song Written and/or Recorded for a Film	Glasgow (No Place Like Home)	Nominated (Note: Shared with Caitlyn Smith, Kate York, Mary Steenburgen, & Karen Elliott.)	
Hawaii Film Critics Society	2026	Best Actress	Hamnet	Won	
Houston Film Critics Society	2022	Best Supporting Actress	The Lost Daughter	Nominated	
Houston Film Critics Society	2023	Best Supporting Actress	Women Talking	Nominated	
Houston Film Critics Society	2026	Best Actress	Hamnet	Won	
Indiana Film Journalists Association	2018	Breakout of the Year	Beast	Nominated	
Indiana Film Journalists Association	2018	Best Actress	Beast	Nominated	
Indiana Film Journalists Association	2019	Best Actress	Wild Rose	Nominated	
Indiana Film Journalists Association	2020	Best Actress	I'm Thinking of Ending Things	Nominated	
Indiana Film Journalists Association	2021	Best Supporting Actress	The Lost Daughter	Nominated	
Indiana Film Journalists Association	2023	Best Lead Performance	Men	Nominated	
Indiana Film Journalists Association	2023	Best Supporting Performance	Women Talking	Nominated	
Indiana Film Journalists Association	2026	Best Lead Performance	Hamnet	Runner-up	
IndieWire Critics Poll	2020	Best Performance	I'm Thinking of Ending Things	6th place	
IndieWire Critics Poll	2025	Best Performance	Hamnet	4th place	
International Cinephile Society	2026	Best Actress	Hamnet	Nominated	
Iowa Film Critics Association	2025	Best Actress	Hamnet	Won	
Kansas City Film Critics Circle	2025	Best Actress	Hamnet	Nominated	
Las Vegas Film Critics Society	2022	Best Supporting Actress	Women Talking	Nominated	
Las Vegas Film Critics Society	2025	Best Actress	Hamnet	Nominated	
Latino Entertainment Journalists Association	2026	Best Actress	Hamnet	Nominated	
London Film Critics' Circle	2019	British/Irish Actress of the Year	Beast	Won	
London Film Critics' Circle	2020	British/Irish Actress of the Year	Judy	Nominated	
London Film Critics' Circle	2020	British/Irish Actress of the Year	Wild Rose	Nominated	
London Film Critics' Circle	2021	British/Irish Actress of the Year	I'm Thinking of Ending Things	Nominated	
London Film Critics' Circle	2021	British/Irish Actress of the Year	Misbehaviour	Nominated	
London Film Critics' Circle	2022	British/Irish Actress of the Year	The Lost Daughter	Nominated	
London Film Critics' Circle	2022	Supporting Actress of the Year	The Lost Daughter	Nominated	
London Film Critics' Circle	2026	Actress of the Year	Hamnet	Won	
London Film Critics' Circle	2026	British/Irish Performer of the Year	Hamnet	Nominated	
Los Angeles Film Critics Association	2022	Best Supporting Performance	Women Talking	Runner-up (Note: Shared with Brian Tyree Henry for Causeway.)	
Mercury Prize	2022	Album of the Year	For All Our Days That Tear the Heart	Nominated (Note: Shared with Bernard Butler.)	
Michigan Movie Critics Guild	2025	Best Actress	Hamnet	Won	
Mill Valley Film Festival	2025	Mill Valley Film Festival Award	Hamnet	Won	
Minnesota Film Critics Alliance	2023	Best Supporting Actress	Women Talking	Nominated	
Minnesota Film Critics Alliance	2026	Best Actress	Hamnet	Won	
Music City Film Critics Association	2026	Best Actress	Hamnet	Nominated	
National Society of Film Critics	2022	Best Supporting Actress	The Lost Daughter	3rd place	
New Jersey Film Critics Circle	2025	Best Actress	Hamnet	Won	
New York Film Critics Online	2025	Best Actress	Hamnet	Won	
New York Film Critics Online	2025	Best Ensemble	Hamnet	Nominated	
North Carolina Film Critics Association	2021	Best Actress	I'm Thinking of Ending Things	Nominated	
North Carolina Film Critics Association	2026	Best Actress	Hamnet	Won	
North Dakota Film Society	2022	Best Supporting Actress	The Lost Daughter	Nominated	
North Dakota Film Society	2026	Best Actress	Hamnet	Won	
North Dakota Film Society	2026	Best Ensemble	Hamnet	Nominated	
North Texas Film Critics Association	2025	Best Actress	Hamnet	Won	
North Texas Film Critics Association	2025	Gary Murray Award	Hamnet	Nominated	
Oklahoma Film Critics Circle	2026	Best Actress	Hamnet	Won	
Online Association of Female Film Critics	2019	Best Female Lead	Wild Rose	Nominated	
Online Association of Female Film Critics	2022	Best Supporting Actress	Women Talking	Nominated	
Online Association of Female Film Critics	2022	Best Ensemble	Women Talking	Won	
Online Association of Female Film Critics	2025	Best Female Lead	Hamnet	Runner-up	
Online Association of Female Film Critics	2025	Best Ensemble	Hamnet	Nominated	
Online Film & Television Association	2019	Best Ensemble in a Motion Picture or Limited Series	Chernobyl	Nominated	
Online Film & Television Association	2021	Best Supporting Actress in a Motion Picture or Limited Series	Fargo	Nominated	
Online Film & Television Association	2026	Best Actress	Hamnet	Won	
Online Film Critics Society	2021	Best Actress	I'm Thinking of Ending Things	Nominated	
Online Film Critics Society	2026	Best Actress	Hamnet	Won	
Palm Springs International Film Festival	2026	Vanguard Award	Hamnet	Won (Note: Shared with the cast of Hamnet and Chloé Zhao.)	
Philadelphia Film Critics Circle	2025	Best Actress	Hamnet	Won	
Phoenix Critics Circle	2025	Best Actress in a Leading Role	Hamnet	Won	
Phoenix Film Critics Society	2025	Best Actress in a Leading Role	Hamnet	Won	
Portland Critics Association	2021	Best Female Supporting Role	The Lost Daughter	Nominated	
Portland Critics Association	2025	Best Lead Performance	Hamnet	Won (Note: Shared with Rose Byrne for If I Had Legs I'd Kick You and Timothée Chalamet for Marty Supreme.)	
Puerto Rico Critics Association	2026	Best Actress	Hamnet	Nominated	
San Diego Film Critics Society	2019	Breakthrough Artist	Wild Rose	Nominated	
San Diego Film Critics Society	2019	Breakthrough Artist	Judy	Nominated	
San Diego Film Critics Society	2023	Breakthrough Artist	Women Talking	Nominated	
San Diego Film Critics Society	2024	Best Supporting Actress	Wicked Little Letters	Nominated	
San Diego Film Critics Society	2025	Best Actress	Hamnet	Won (Note: Tied with Rose Byrne for If I Had Legs I'd Kick You.)	
San Francisco Bay Area Film Critics Circle	2022	Best Supporting Actress	The Lost Daughter	Nominated	
San Francisco Bay Area Film Critics Circle	2025	Best Actress	Hamnet	Runner-up	
Seattle Film Critics Society	2025	Best Actress	Hamnet	Won	
Southeastern Film Critics Association	2025	Best Actress	Hamnet	Won	
St. Louis Film Critics Association	2020	Best Actress	I'm Thinking of Ending Things	Nominated	
St. Louis Film Critics Association	2022	Best Ensemble	Women Talking	Won	
St. Louis Film Critics Association	2025	Best Actress	Hamnet	Won	
St. Louis Film Critics Association	2025	Best Ensemble	Hamnet	Nominated	
Toronto Film Critics Association	2022	Best Supporting Actress	The Lost Daughter	Won	
Toronto Film Critics Association	2023	Best Supporting Actress	Women Talking	Runner-up	
Toronto Film Critics Association	2025	Outstanding Lead Performance	Hamnet	Runner-up	
Vancouver Film Critics Circle	2022	Best Supporting Actress	The Lost Daughter	Nominated	
Vancouver Film Critics Circle	2023	Best Supporting Actress	Women Talking	Won	
Vancouver Film Critics Circle	2026	Best Actress	Hamnet	Won	
UK Film Critics Association	2025	Best Actress	Hamnet	Won	
US-Ireland Alliance	2023	Oscar Wilde Award	—N/a	Honored	
Utah Film Critics Association	2026	Best Actress	Hamnet	Won	
Washington D.C. Area Film Critics Association	2025	Best Actress	Hamnet	Won	
Washington D.C. Area Film Critics Association	2025	Best Ensemble	Hamnet	Nominated	
WhatsOnStage Awards	2022	Best Actress in a Musical	Cabaret	Nominated	
Women Film Critics Circle	2019	Best Actress	Wild Rose	Nominated	
Women Film Critics Circle	2025	Best Actress	Hamnet	Won	

== See also ==
- List of Irish actors
- List of Academy Award winners and nominees from Ireland
- List of actors with Academy Award nominations
