= Dawn Sievewright =

Scottish Actress

Dawn Sievewright (born c. 1987/88) is an Olivier nominated Scottish actress and writer. She is best known for her roles in Glasgow Girls, Our Ladies of Perpetual Succour and Wild Rose.

== Personal life ==
Born in Glasgow Sievewright grew up in Bishopbriggs. Her mother was a ballroom and Latin dance teacher and her dad a sound engineer. She attended The Dance School of Scotland, before joining the Guildford School of Acting in London aged 17. Sievewright has struggled with her sobriety.

== Career ==
Shortly after graduating in 2009, she was cast as one of the of Guardian Angels in the UK Tour of Quadrophenia. In 2010, Sievewright made her West End debut in Legally Blonde.

In 2012, she returned to Scottish roots and was cast in Glasgow Girls. Sievewright originated the role of Fionnula in Our Ladies of Perpetual Succour, a role she ultimately played for three years. She was nominated for Best Actress in a Supporting Role at the 2017 Olivier Awards alongside the rest of the cast. In 2017, she played the role of Lampy in the 2017 Royal National Theatre production of Pinocchio.

In 2024, Sievewright was cast in the title role of Rose-Lynn Harlan in the musical Wild Rose. An adaption of the 2018 film it received its world premiere at the Royal Lyceum Theatre in 2025, earning her a Critics' Awards for Theatre in Scotland nomination for Outstanding Performance.

In December 2025, she was granted the First Draft development scheme at Screen Scotland, to work on her first draft of Mimi. She previously co-wrote a semi autobiographical pilot called STEP9 for BBC Three .

Sievewrights other stage credits include The A-Z of Mrs P (2014), My Left Right Foot (2018), Twelfth Night (2019), Spuds (2019), Still Game the Final Farewell (2019), The Welkin (2020), No Love Songs (2024), A Midsummer Night's Dream (2024) and Mayday (2026).

Her screen credits include Star Wars: Andor (2022), Shetland (2022), Man & Witch (2024), Vigil (2026), Granite Harbour (2026) and The Undertow (2027).

She has worked as a guest tutor for the UK Theatre School.

== Awards and nominations ==
| Year | Award | Category | Work | Result | Ref. |
|---|---|---|---|---|---|
| 2017 | Laurence Olivier Awards | Best Actress in a Supporting Role | Our Ladies of Perpetual Succour | Nominated | |
| 2025 | Critics' Awards for Theatre in Scotland | Outstanding Performance | Wild Rose | Nominated | |
| 2025 | UK Theatre Awards | Best Performance in a Musical | Wild Rose | Nominated | |
