= Wild Rose (musical) =

2025 musical

- Sing Your Own Song
- Music: Various
- Lyrics: Various
- Book: Nicole Taylor
- Setting: Glasgow and Nashville
- Basis: Wild Rose by Nicole Taylor
- Premiere: 14 March 2025: Royal Lyceum Theatre, Edinburgh
- Productions: 2025 Edinburgh

Wild Rose is a Country Jukebox musical by Nicole Taylor, based on the 2018 film of the same name. Directed by John Tiffany, the world premiere production of Wild Rose opened in Edinburgh at the Royal Lyceum Theatre in March 2025.

== Background ==
The musical is based on the 2018 indie film Wild Rose. The film starred Jessie Buckley and was directed by Tom Harper, based on an original screenplay by Nicole Taylor. It won three British Academy Scotland Awards, including best film actress for Buckley, best writer film/television for Taylor and won best feature film. It also won the Critics' Choice Awards, Hollywood Critics Association and Houston Film Critics Society Awards for best song and the British Independent Film Awards for best music.

The show has a book by the film's original screenwriter Nicole Taylor, with direction by John Tiffany, set design by Chloe Lamford, costume design by Katrina Lindsay, sound by Olivier winner Tony Gayle, lighting by Jessica Hung Han Yun and choreography Steven Hoggett and Vicki Manderson.

The film follows Rose-Lynn, an aspiring country singer and single mother from Glasgow, who is recently released from Jail. Having lost her job in the house band at Glasgow's Grand Ole Opry, she dreams of Nashville, but the realities of raising two young children hits closer to home.

== Production history ==
In 2022, it was announced that the stage musical was in production, with a world premiere to be held at an undisclosed Scottish theatre. A workshop was scheduled for 2023. In May 2024, it was announced that it would receive its world premiere in 2025, at the Royal Lyceum Theatre in Edinburgh, as part of their 2024–2025 season.

It received its world premiere at the Royal Lyceum Theatre, on 14 March 2025, following previews from 6 March. Prior to opening at the Lyceum, the run was extended by two weeks until 19 April. On 4 October 2024, title casting was announced with Dawn Sievewright playing Rose-Lynn Harlan. Further principal casting included Blythe Duff as Marion, Janet Kumah as Susannah, Louise McCarthy as Jackie, Peter Hannah as Sam, Hannah Jarrett-Scott as Kathy, Andy Clark as Alan, Liz Ewing as Agnes and Amber Sylvia Edwards as Eileen.

In September 2026, it was announced that Wild Rose would make its US debut off-Broadway at the New York Theatre Workshop on 10 January 2027. The off-Broadway production would be led by Madeline Brewer.

== Musical Numbers ==
Act 1:

- "Country Girl"
- "Baby I'm Burning"
- "Get Out Of This Town"
- "Peace in This House"
- "He'll Be Back"
- "Outlaw State of Mind"

Act 2:

- "When I Reach The Place I'm Goin'"
- "Tacoma"
- "You'll Never Leave Harlan Alive"
- "Goodbye Earl"
- "(I Never Promised You A) Rose Garden"
- "Top Of The World"
- "Glasgow (No Place Like Home)"

== Cast and characters ==
Original cast of Wild Rose

Character	World Premiere
Character	2025
Rose-Lynn Harlan	Dawn Sievewright
Marion	Blythe Duff
Susannah	Janet Kumah
Jackie	Louise McCarthy
Sam	Peter Hannah
Kathy	Hannah Jarrett-Scott
Alan Boyne	Andy Clark
Agnes	Liz Ewing
Eileen	Amber Sylvia Edwards
Lyle	Leo Stephen Alfie Campbell Calum Middleton
Wynonna	Ayla Sherriff Jessie-Lou Harvie Lily Ferguson
