= Critics' Choice Super Award for Best Actress in a Horror Movie =

Film award category

- The 2026 recipient: Inde Navarrette
- Country: United States
- Presented by: Critics Choice Association
- First award: 2021
- Currently held by: Inde Navarrette, Obsession (2026)

Highlights
- Most nominations: Jessie Buckley; Mia Goth; Rebecca Hall; (2)
- Website: http://www.criticschoice.com

The Critics' Choice Super Award for Best Actress in a Horror Movie is an award presented by the Critics Choice Association to the best performance by an actress in a horror film.

This award was first presented at the 1st Critics' Choice Super Awards in 2021 to Elisabeth Moss for her role as Cecilia Kass in The Invisible Man. The most nominated actresses in this category are Mia Goth and Rebecca Hall with 2 nominations.

The current recipient of the award is Inde Navarrette for her role as Nikki Freeman in Obsession.

== Winners and nominees ==
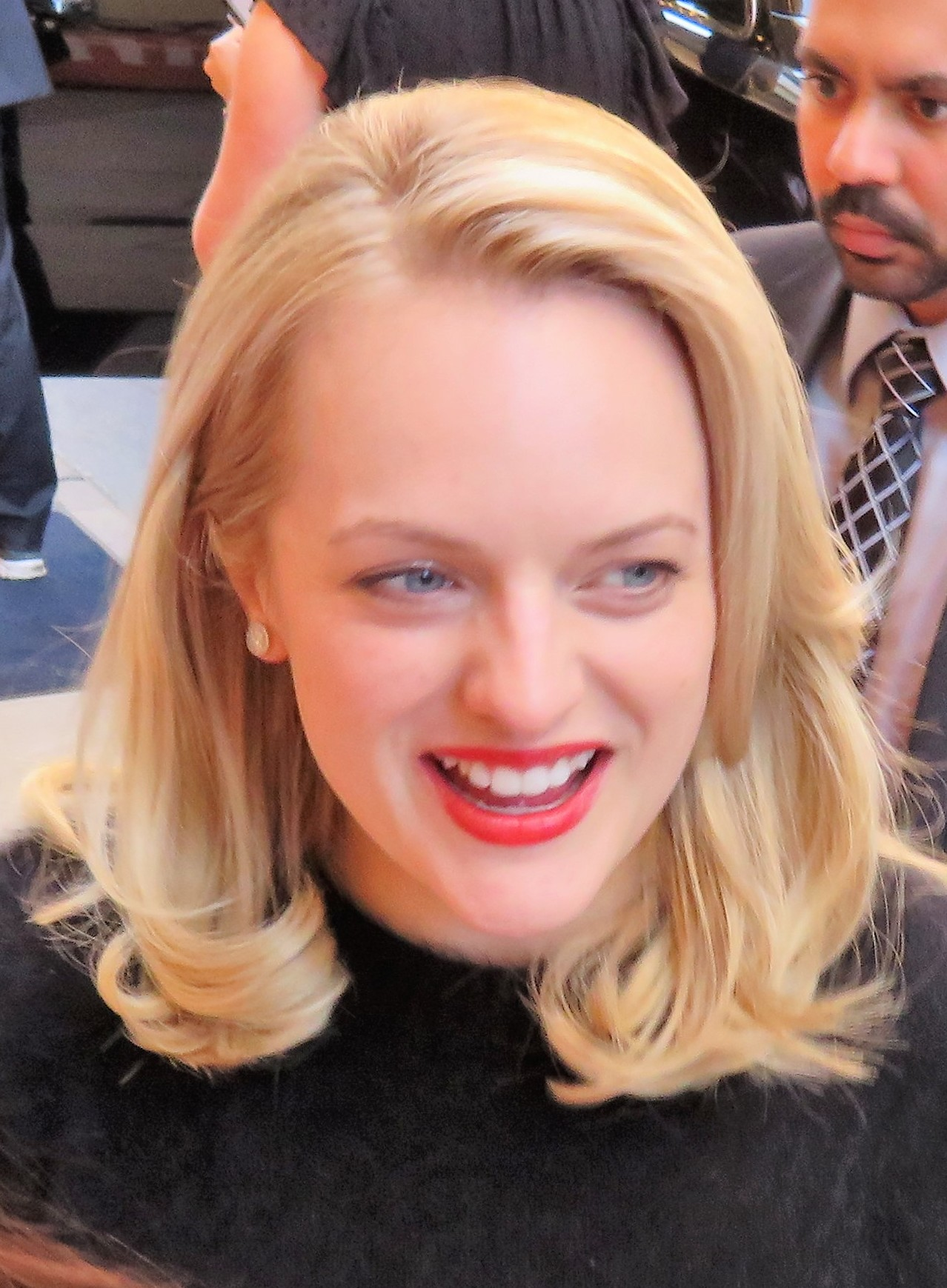
Elisabeth Moss won for The Invisible Man (2021)

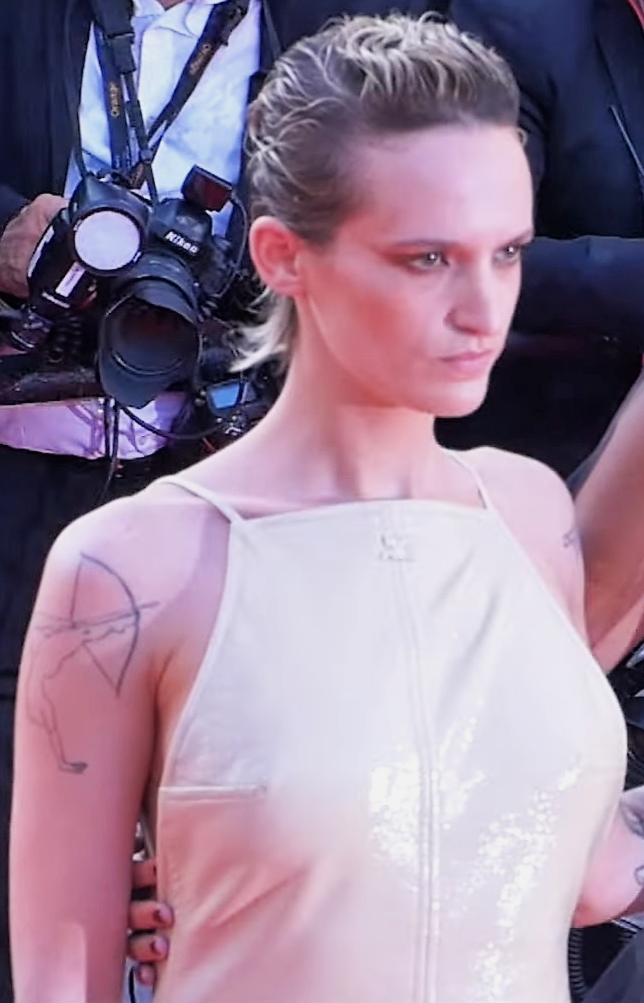
Agathe Rousselle won for Titane (2022)

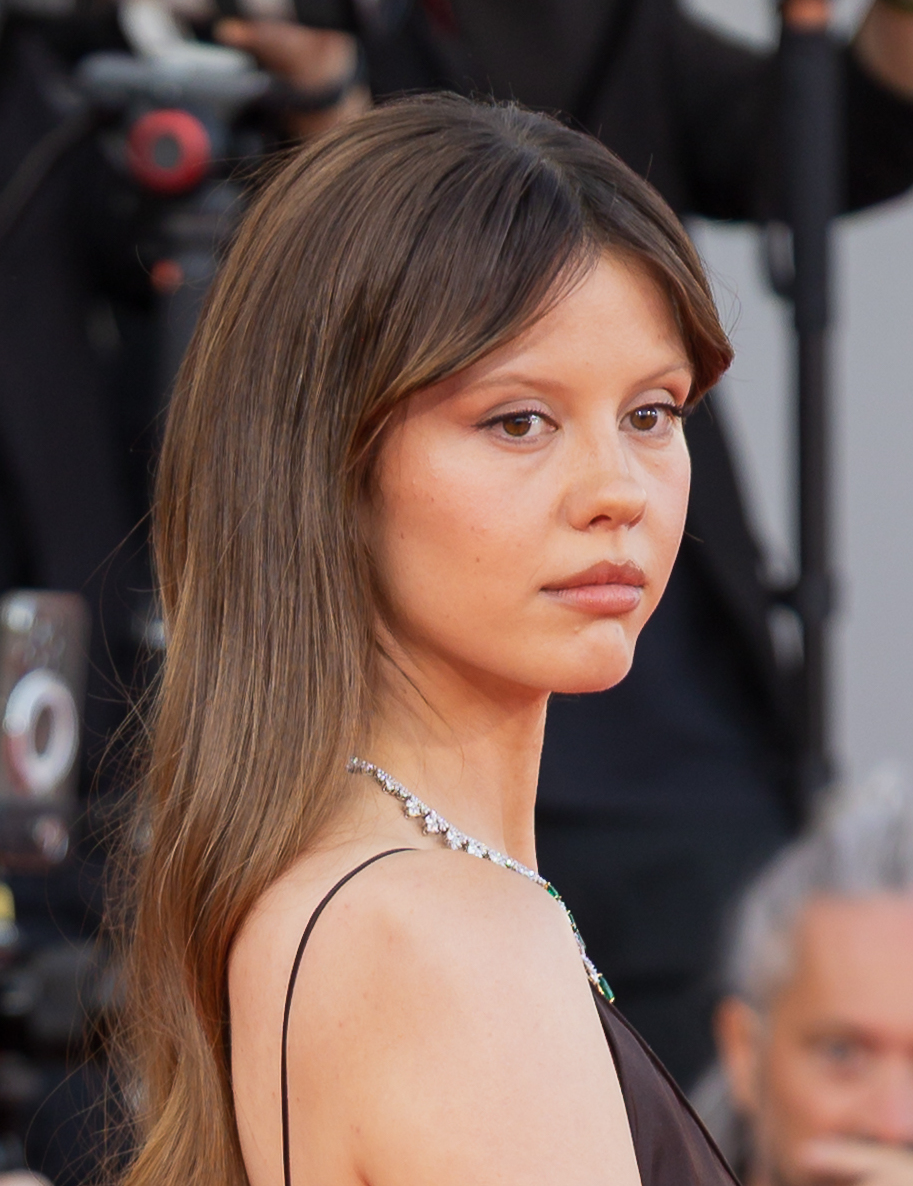
Mia Goth won for Pearl (2023)

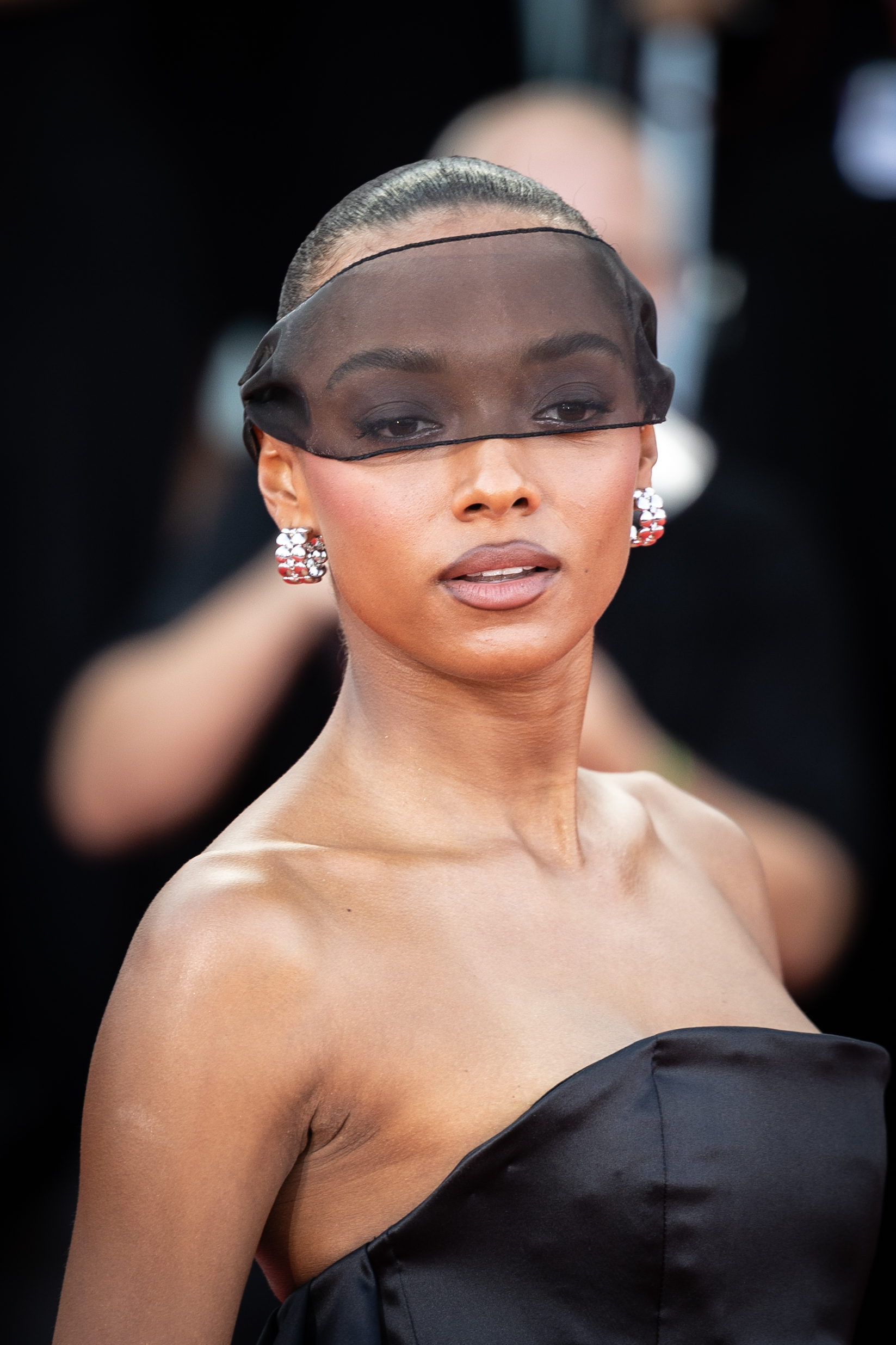
Sophie Wilde won for Talk to Me (2024)

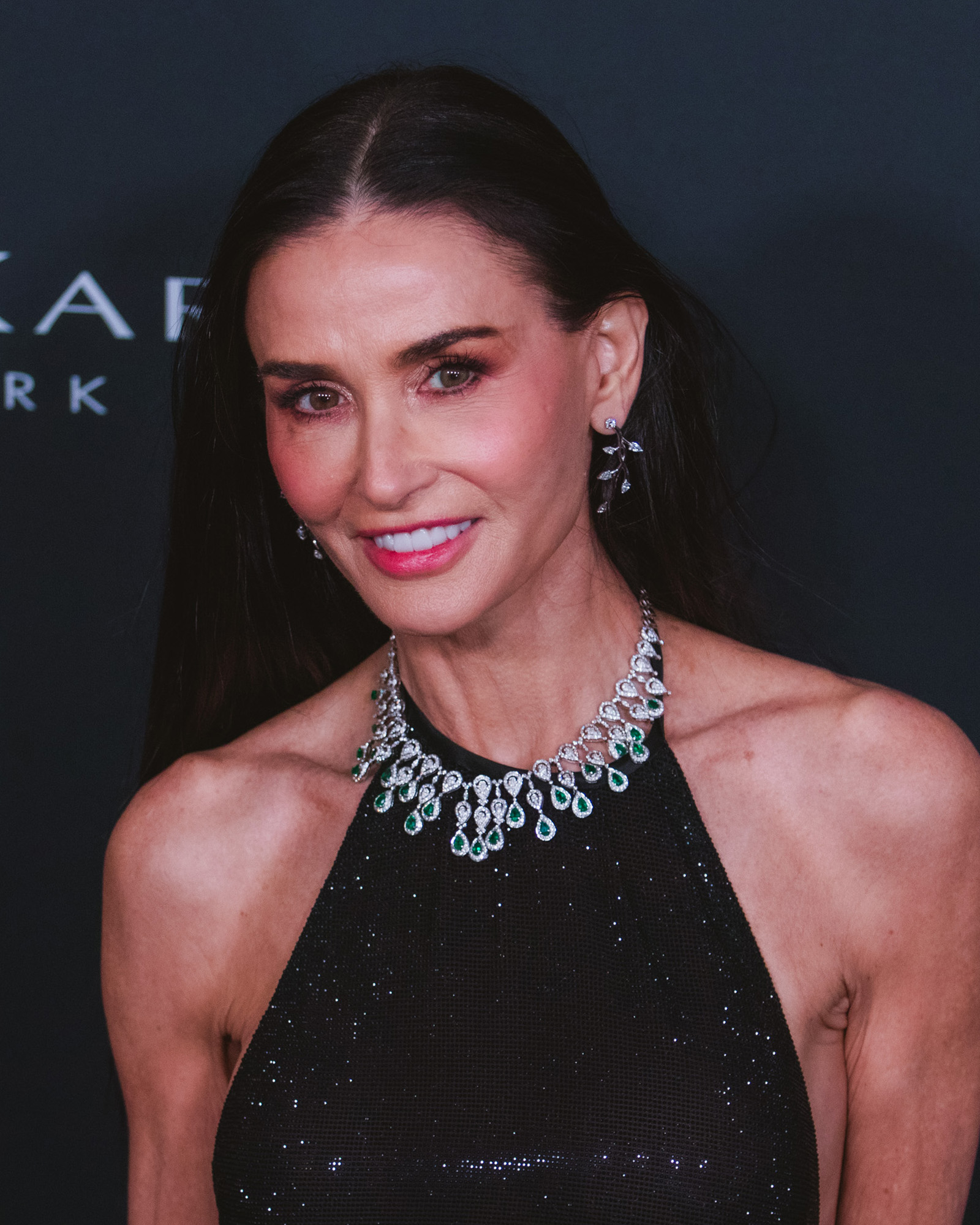
Demi Moore won for The Substance (2025)

=== 2020s ===
Year	Actor	Role(s)	Project(s)	Ref.
2021	Elisabeth Moss	Cecilia Kass	The Invisible Man	
2021	Haley Bennett	Hunter Conrad	Swallow	
2021	Angela Bettis	Mandy	12 Hour Shift	
2021	Kathryn Newton	Millie Kessler	Freaky	
2021	Sheila Vand	Mina	The Rental	
2022	Agathe Rousselle	Alexia	Titane	
2022	Barbara Crampton	Anne Feder	Jakob's Wife	
2022	Rebecca Hall	Beth	The Night House	
2022	Thomasin McKenzie	Eloise "Ellie" Turner	Last Night in Soho	
2022	Millicent Simmonds	Reagan Abbott	A Quiet Place Part II	
2022	Anya Taylor-Joy	Alexandra "Sandie" Collins	Last Night in Soho	
2023	Mia Goth	Pearl	Pearl	
2023	Jessie Buckley	Harper Marlowe	Men	
2023	Aisha Dee	Cecilia / Sissy	Sissy	
2023	Anna Diop	Aisha	Nanny	
2023	Rebecca Hall	Margaret	Resurrection	
2024	Sophie Wilde	Mia	Talk to Me	
2024	Amie Donald and Jenna Davis	M3GAN	M3GAN	
2024	Mia Goth	Gabi Bauer	Infinity Pool	
2024	Jenna Ortega	Tara Carpenter	Scream VI	
2024	Alyssa Sutherland	Ellie	Evil Dead Rise	
2025	Demi Moore	Elisabeth Sparkle	The Substance	
2025	Lily-Rose Depp	Ellen Hutter	Nosferatu	
2025	Willa Fitzgerald	The Lady	Strange Darling	
2025	Sally Hawkins	Laura	Bring Her Back	
2025	Wunmi Mosaku	Annie	Sinners	
2025	Naomi Scott	Skye Riley	Smile 2	
2026	Inde Navarrette	Nikki Freeman	Obsession	
2026	Alison Brie	Millie Wilson	Together	
2026	Jessie Buckley	Ida / Penelope Rogers / The Bride / Mary Shelley	The Bride!	
2026	Amy Madigan	Aunt Gladys	Weapons	
2026	Rachel McAdams	Linda Liddle	Send Help	
2026	Renate Reinsve	Mary Kline	Backrooms	

== Performers with multiple nominations ==
2 nominations

- Jessie Buckley
- Mia Goth
- Rebecca Hall

== See also ==
- Critics' Choice Super Award for Best Horror Movie
- Critics' Choice Super Award for Best Actor in a Horror Movie
