= London Film Critics Circle Awards 2019 =

British film awards ceremony

40th London Film Critics' Circle Awards

30 January 2020

Film of the Year:
Parasite

British/Irish Film of the Year:
The Souvenir

The 40th London Film Critics' Circle Awards, honouring the best in film for 2019, were announced by the London Film Critics' Circle on 30 January 2020 at The May Fair Hotel, in Mayfair, London. The nominations were announced on 17 December 2019. The event was hosted by actor and writer Sally Phillips.

== Winners and nominees ==
Winners are listed first and highlighted with boldface.

Film of the Year	Director of the Year
**Parasite**; 1917; The Irishman; Joker; Knives Out; Marriage Story; Midsommar; Pain and Glory; Portrait of a Lady on Fire; The Souvenir	**Bong Joon-ho – Parasite**; Pedro Almodóvar – Pain and Glory; Sam Mendes – 1917; Céline Sciamma – Portrait of a Lady on Fire; Martin Scorsese – The Irishman
Actor of the Year	Actress of the Year
**Joaquin Phoenix – Joker**; Antonio Banderas – Pain and Glory; Tom Burke – The Souvenir; Robert De Niro – The Irishman; Adam Driver – Marriage Story	**Renée Zellweger – Judy**; Scarlett Johansson – Marriage Story; Lupita Nyong'o – Us; Florence Pugh – Midsommar; Charlize Theron – Bombshell
Supporting Actor of the Year	Supporting Actress of the Year
**Joe Pesci – The Irishman**; Tom Hanks – A Beautiful Day in the Neighborhood; Shia LaBeouf – Honey Boy; Al Pacino – The Irishman; Brad Pitt – Once Upon a Time in Hollywood	**Laura Dern – Marriage Story**; Jennifer Lopez – Hustlers; Florence Pugh – Little Women; Margot Robbie – Bombshell; Tilda Swinton – The Souvenir
Screenwriter of the Year	Foreign Language Film of the Year
**Noah Baumbach – Marriage Story**; Pedro Almodóvar – Pain and Glory; Joanna Hogg – The Souvenir; Bong Joon-ho and Han Jin-won – Parasite; Steven Zaillian – The Irishman	**Portrait of a Lady on Fire**; Happy as Lazzaro; Monos; Pain and Glory; Parasite
Documentary of the Year	British/Irish Film of the Year
**For Sama**; Amazing Grace; Apollo 11; The Cave; Varda by Agnès	**The Souvenir**; 1917; Bait; Rocketman; Wild Rose
British/Irish Actor of the Year	British/Irish Actress of the Year
**Robert Pattinson – High Life, The King, and The Lighthouse**; Tom Burke – The Souvenir; Taron Egerton – Rocketman; George MacKay – 1917, Ophelia, and Where Hands Touch; Jonathan Pryce – The Two Popes	**Florence Pugh – Fighting with My Family, Little Women, and Midsommar**; Jessie Buckley – Judy and Wild Rose; Cynthia Erivo – Harriet; Lesley Manville – Maleficent: Mistress of Evil and Ordinary Love; Saoirse Ronan – Little Women
Young British/Irish Performer of the Year	Breakthrough British/Irish Filmmaker of the Year
**Honor Swinton Byrne – The Souvenir**; Raffey Cassidy – Vox Lux; Dean-Charles Chapman – 1917, Blinded by the Light, and The King; Roman Griffin Davis – Jojo Rabbit; Noah Jupe – Ford v Ferrari and Honey Boy	**Mark Jenkin – Bait**; Waad Al-Kateab and Edward Watts – For Sama; Richard Billingham – Ray & Liz; Owen McCafferty – Ordinary Love; Nicole Taylor – Wild Rose
British/Irish Short Film of the Year	Technical Achievement Award
**The Devil's Harmony**; Appreciation; Beyond the North Winds: A Post-Nuclear Reverie; Kingdom, Come; Pompeii	**Barbara Ling – Once Upon a Time in Hollywood, production design**; Will Becher and Richard Phelan – A Shaun the Sheep Movie: Farmageddon, animation; Jacqueline Durran – Little Women, costume design; Lee Ha-jun – Parasite, production design; Allen Maris – Ad Astra, visual effects; Todd Douglas Miller – Apollo 11, film editing; Daniel Pemberton – Motherless Brooklyn, music; Oliver Tarney – 1917, sound design; Jasper Wolf – Monos, cinematography; Jeremy Woodhead – Judy, makeup and hair

== Special awards ==
=== The Dilys Powell Award for Excellence in Film ===
- Sally Potter
- Sandy Powell

=== The 40th Anniversary Award ===
- Aardman
