= Wild Rose (soundtrack) =

Wild Rose (Original Motion Picture Soundtrack)

Soundtrack album by Jessie Buckley
- Released: 12 April 2019
- Genre: Country
- Label: Island
- Producer: Jack Arnold

Jessie Buckley chronology
Wild Rose (Original Motion Picture Soundtrack) (2019)	For All Our Days That Tear the Heart (2022)

Singles from Wild Rose (Original Motion Picture Soundtrack)
- 1. "Country Girl" Released: 22 February 2019; 2. "Born to Run" Released: 19 March 2019; 3. "Glasgow (No Place Like Home)" Released: 5 April 2019

Wild Rose is the soundtrack to the 2018 British film of the same name, released by Island Records on 12 April 2019.

The album features both original songs written exclusively for the film and covers of songs by established country artists such as Emmylou Harris, Wynonna Judd, Chris Stapleton, Hank Snow, and folk artists John Prine and Patty Griffin, as well as indie rock band Primal Scream. All songs are performed by singer Jessie Buckley, with the exception of tracks 17, 18, and 19 (which are performed by The Bluegrass Smugglers), and track 20 (which is performed by Hillary Klug). The album charted at No. 76 on the UK Albums Chart and at No. 1 on the UK Country Albums Chart.

== Singles ==
"Country Girl" was released as the soundtrack's lead single on 22 February 2019. An accompanying music video, directed by Libby Burke Wilde, was released on 1 March 2019. Two more singles followed, "Born to Run" and "Glasgow (No Place Like Home)".

== Track listing ==
No.	Title	Writer(s)	Original Artist	Length
1.	"Country Girl"	Martin Duffy; Bobby Gillespie; Andrew Innes; Gary Mounfield	Primal Scream	4:48
2.	"Outlaw State of Mind"	Ronnie Bowman; Jerry Salley; Chris Stapleton	Chris Stapleton	3:16
3.	"Born to Run"	Paul Kennerley	Emmylou Harris	3:14
4.	"Peace in This House"	Doug Gill; Angela Kaset	Wynonna Judd	4:41
5.	"I'm Moving On"	Hank Snow	Hank Snow	2:16
6.	"Crying Over"	Patty Griffin	Patty Griffin	5:57
7.	"Angel from Montgomery"	John Prine	John Prine	4:05
8.	"Cigarette Row (5 O'Clock Freedom)"		N/A	3:02
9.	"Alright to Be All Wrong (The Dreamer's Song)"		N/A	3:04
10.	"When I Reach the Place I'm Goin'"	Emory Gordy Jr.; Joe Henry	Wynonna Judd	3:21
11.	"Glasgow (No Place Like Home)"	Mary Steenburgen; Caitlyn Smith; Kate York		4:13
12.	"Goin' Back to Harlan"	Anna McGarrigle	Kate & Anna McGarrigle	4:29
13.	"Covered in Regret (Blue, Black and Red)"		N/A	4:12
14.	"Robbing the Bank of Life (Stealing the Night)"		N/A	2:21
15.	"That's the View from Here (Famous Folks Are Weird)"		N/A	5:08
16.	"Boulder to Birmingham"	Emmylou Harris; Bill Danoff	Emmylou Harris	4:38
17.	"Euston Hustle"		N/A	1:16
18.	"The Red Kitchen"		N/A	0:56
19.	"The Beach"		N/A	2:21
20.	"Le Petit Chat Gris"		N/A	1:20
21.	"Glasgow (No Place Like Home) [live from the Old Fruit Market, Glasgow]"		N/A	4:13
