= Nicole Taylor (screenwriter) =

Scottish screenwriter

Nicole Taylor is a Scottish screenwriter. She won a British Academy of Film and Television Arts for Best Writer for her three-part BBC series Three Girls about the Rochdale child sex abuse ring.

== Early life and education ==
Taylor was born and raised in Glasgow, where she attended Craigholme School and graduated from the University of Oxford. Growing up, she was a country music fan.

== Career ==
Upon graduating, Taylor wrote for Ashes to Ashes, The C-Word, Indian Summers, and The Hour. In 2017, she received a British Academy of Film and Television Arts for Best Writer for her three-part BBC series Three Girls. Taylor was also named an Edinburgh International Film Festival Screenwriter-in-Residence.

On 22 August 2018, BBC One announced that Taylor would write for an upcoming drama called The Nest. While writing for The Nest, Taylor used inspiration from her own life and her fondness of country music. She was also introduced to Krysty Wilson-Cairns, an alumna of Craigholme, and they discovered they were inspired by the same teacher during their school years. In the same year, Taylor and Jessie Buckley collaborated on writing several songs for Wild Rose. For her part as a writer, Taylor received the 2019 Feature Film and Writer Film/Television Award at the BAFTA Scotland Awards. Taylor has adapted her original screenplay for the stage, with the musical having premiered in March 2025, at the Royal Lyceum Theatre. Taylor led the writers room for the 2024 Netflix miniseries One Day.
