= For All Our Days That Tear the Heart =

Studio album by Jessie Buckley and Bernard Butler
- Released: 17 June 2022
- Genre: Folk
- Length: 50:25
- Label: EMI
- Producer: Bernard Butler

Jessie Buckley chronology
| Wild Rose (2019) | For All Our Days That Tear the Heart (2022) |

Bernard Butler chronology
| In Memory of My Feelings (2020) | For All Our Days That Tear the Heart (2022) |

Singles from For All Our Days That Tear The Heart
- 1. "The Eagle & the Dove" Released: 15 April 2022; 2. "Seven Red Rose Tattoos" Released: 14 May 2022; 3. "For All Our Days That Tear the Heart" Released: 20 May 2022; 4. "Footnotes on the Map" Released: 27 May 2022

For All Our Days That Tear the Heart is a collaborative album by Irish actress Jessie Buckley and former Suede guitarist Bernard Butler. Released on 17 June 2022 by EMI Records, it was preceded by the release of the singles "The Eagle & the Dove", "Seven Red Rose Tattoos", the title track "For All Our Days That Tear the Heart", and "Footnotes on the Map". The album debuted at No. 23 on the UK Albums Chart. It was shortlisted for the 2022 Mercury Prize.

== Background ==
Prior to formally meeting, both were familiarized with each other's work. Buckley stated that she had been listening to the Butler-produced album Old Wow by folk singer Sam Lee in the downtime between rehearsals for the National Theatre's production of Romeo and Juliet, while Butler had seen Buckley perform "Glasgow (No Place Like Home)" on an American chat show in promotion of 2018's Wild Rose. In an April 2022 interview with NME, Butler said about his first impression: "I remember clocking just how much character there was in her voice and how freely she expressed it."

The pair were first introduced to each other by Buckley's manager, who sensed they were kindred spirits. "It all started with a FaceTime call from Butler's North London kitchen to Buckley's mountaintop residence in County Kerry, with their friendship growing from an unlikely shared love of Killarney and the small island of Valentia where Butler would go on holiday as a boy", says a statement released about the collaboration.

== Critical reception ==
Professional ratings
Aggregate scores
| Source | Rating |
|---|---|
| Metacritic | 71/100 |
Review scores
| Source | Rating |
| Evening Standard | 4/5 stars |
| The Guardian | 4/5 stars |
| Hot Press | 8/10 |
| The Irish Times | 4/5 stars |
| The List | 4/5 stars |
| Mojo | 3/5 stars |
| Record Collector | 4/5 stars |
| The Sunday Times | 4/5 stars |
| The Telegraph | 4/5 stars |
| Uncut | 7/10 |

At Metacritic, which assigns a normalised rating out of 100 to reviews from mainstream publications, the album received an average score of 71 based on 4 reviews, indicating "generally favorable reviews".

The album was shortlisted for the 2022 Mercury Prize.

As of 8 September 2022, the album had 6,497 sales.

== Track listing ==
For All Our Days That Tear the Heart track listing
| No. | Title | Length |
|---|---|---|
| 1. | "The Eagle & the Dove" | 5:49 |
| 2. | "For All Our Days That Tear the Heart" | 5:00 |
| 3. | "20 Years A-Growing" | 4:03 |
| 4. | "Babylon Days" | 4:27 |
| 5. | "Seven Red Rose Tattoos" | 5:00 |
| 6. | "Footnotes on the Map" | 3:50 |
| 7. | "We've Run the Distance" | 3:27 |
| 8. | "We Haven't Spoke About the Weather" | 4:18 |
| 9. | "Beautiful Regret" | 3:11 |
| 10. | "I Cried Your Tears" | 4:08 |
| 11. | "Shallow the Water" | 5:01 |
| 12. | "Catch the Dust" | 2:11 |
| Total length: | | 50:25 |

== Charts ==
Chart performance for For All Our Days That Tear the Heart
| Chart (2022) | Peak position |
|---|---|
| Irish Albums (IRMA) | 35 |
| Scottish Albums (Official Charts) | 8 |
| UK Albums (Official Charts) | 23 |
| UK Album Downloads (Official Charts) | 6 |
| UK Folk Albums (Official Charts) | 1 |
