= Birds of Paradise Theatre Company =

Scottish theatre company

Founded in 1993,, Birds of Paradise Theatre Company (BOP) is Scotland's only professional, disability-led theatre company based in Glasgow, Scotland.

== History ==
Birds of Paradise was established by a collective of disabled artists responding to limited representation and opportunities in Scottish theatre. Early productions focused explicitly on disabled experience, though the company's repertoire has since broadened to include comedies, musicals and physical theatre, with casts and creative teams predominantly featuring disabled artists. BOP integrates British Sign Language (BSL) interpretation, audio description and captioning into productions as creative elements rather than add-on services. Robert Softley Gale became Artistic Director in 2012.

== Notable Productions ==
=== Wendy Hoose (2014) ===
Wendy Hoose, co-directed by Johnny McKnight and Robert Softley Gale, follows two people who meet through a dating app: Laura, a wheelchair user, and Jake, a non-disabled man. The play deals with sex and disability. Developed with Random Accomplice, it toured to venues including Soho Theatre in London. The Guardian described it as "raucously funny, rude and brilliant".

=== Purposeless Movements (2016) ===
Written by Robert Softley Gale, Purposeless Movements features four male actors with cerebral palsy and explores masculinity, friendship and societal perceptions of the condition. The Herald described it as "beautifully designed and lit...the show boasts gorgeously emotive live music by Kim Moore and Scott Twynholm".

=== My Left / Right Foot - The Musical (2018) ===
This satirical musical, a co-production with the National Theatre of Scotland, won a Fringe First Award and the Herald Angel Award at the 2018 Edinburgh Festival Fringe. The plot concerns an amateur dramatic society staging a musical version of My Left Foot, and the chaos that follows when they are forced to cast a disabled person in the lead role. The show satirises "cripping up" — the practice of non-disabled actors playing disabled characters. The Stage called it "a gloriously rude, politically incorrect and hugely entertaining show".

=== Don't. Make. Tea. (2024) ===
Rob Drummond's play follows a woman navigating the UK's disability benefits assessment system. The Guardian described it as having a "wicked sense of humour" and noted that it turned "a bureaucratic nightmare into compelling theatre". Some reviewers felt the satirical approach occasionally risked diminishing the seriousness of the real-world issues depicted.

== Development Programmes ==
BOP Young Artists supports disabled artists aged 14–26 through training, mentorship and performance opportunities.

Cue Backstage aims to address the underrepresentation of disabled people in technical theatre roles. It offers paid placements in lighting, sound, stage management and production management at venues including the Tron Theatre and Dundee Rep.

== See also ==
- Theatre in Scotland
