= Beast (2017 film) =

- Theatrical release poster
- Directed by: Michael Pearce
- Written by: Michael Pearce
- Produced by: Kristian Brodie; Lauren Dark; Ivana MacKinnon
- Starring: Jessie Buckley; Johnny Flynn; Geraldine James
- Cinematography: Benjamin Kračun
- Edited by: Maya Maffioli
- Production companies: Agile Films; Stray Bear Productions
- Distributed by: Altitude Film Distribution
- Release dates: 9 September 2017 (TIFF); 27 April 2018 (United Kingdom)
- Running time: 106 minutes
- Country: United Kingdom
- Language: English

Beast is a 2017 British psychological thriller film written and directed by Michael Pearce, starring Jessie Buckley, Johnny Flynn, and Geraldine James.

The film had its world premiere in the Platform section at the 2017 Toronto International Film Festival.

== Plot ==
Treated by her controlling mother as flawed and a burden, 27-year-old Moll works as a tour guide in Jersey while living with her middle-class parents. She is expected to help care for her father, who has dementia, and to provide babysitting for her niece. The island community is on-edge following a string of unsolved rape/murders of young girls.

During Moll's birthday party, her sister hijacks the reception by announcing she is pregnant. Feeling undervalued, Moll self-harms, and then leaves the party for a nightclub where she meets a man; they dance, but in the morning as they walk on the beach, he begins forcing himself on her. A poacher with a hunting rifle rescues her. She is drawn to this young man, Pascal, craving love and excitement, although she is warned by family that he is a low-class loser. As their relationship blossoms, Moll tells him that as a teenager she stabbed a classmate with scissors in self-defence. He shows his support for her.

A fourth murder victim is discovered, a girl who disappeared on the night of Moll's birthday party. Moll is warned by the local police detective, named Clifford, who fancies her, that Pascal was the main suspect in an earlier murder, and was convicted at 18 of sexually assaulting a 14-year-old. She lies to him claiming she met Pascal at the nightclub and they danced there all night. Moll confronts Pascal about both accusations, and he reacts angrily, saying that every day he regrets his mistakes, but the sex with the girl was consensual, and she was manipulated into lying about him. He lets slip that he loves her, and she reciprocates.

At a formal function at the local country club with her family, Moll's sister has Pascal ejected for wearing jeans. Moll indignantly makes a toast saying she forgives her family for everything "they've done for her," and as they leave wrecks the immaculate putting green. She moves into Pascal's modest house, but one night the police arrest Pascal, and interrogate her. She repeats her lie about meeting him in the club. A detective accuses Moll of protecting a murderer who lacks the capacity to love anyone, and wonders aloud if she is seeking retribution against society. Moll returns to Pascal's house alone, where she is plagued by nightmares, and hounded by the press.

Overwhelmed by guilt, she visits the girl she stabbed, and claims she wants to make amends, but when she says she acted in self-defence, the victim yells at her to leave. Moll then attends the dead girl's funeral, and attempts to comfort the bereaved mother, but is yelled at and chased out.

Clifford informs her that they have caught the real murderer, an immigrant farmer, and apologizes for treating her with suspicion but insists that Pascal is still bad news. Relieved, Moll and Pascal celebrate by going out drinking, but when she tells him she cannot stay on this island and suggests they build a life elsewhere, he reacts angrily. They argue, and he slams her against a wall, strangling her. He apologizes, but she runs to Clifford's house and admits to lying about Pascal's whereabouts. She asks him if the immigrant farmer confessed. He says they found his DNA but says he did not confess. After she insults him, he tells her to get out. She goes to where the latest victim was discovered, lies down in the dirty hole and cries in remorse.

When Moll reunites with Pascal, he tells her he is willing to live anywhere for her. Later, at a restaurant, Moll plies Pascal with alcohol, and invites him to admit to the murders, saying she absolutely accepts him for whoever he is. She coaxes him by admitting her own secret: she actually stabbed her classmate deliberately. Pascal appears torn, then says, "It's over. They were nothing to me." Moll seems relieved and happy. On the drive home she asks for a kiss, and when they lean into each other, Moll unbuckles his seat belt and jerks the wheel, overturning car. Badly injured and lying in the street, he asks her to wait as she sits astride him to strangle him. He tells her they are "the same." She shakes her head "no" and then strangles him She then gets to her feet to walk away.

== Cast ==
- Jessie Buckley as Moll
- Johnny Flynn as Pascal Renouf
- Emily Taaffe as Tamara
- Geraldine James as Hilary Huntingdon
- Trystan Gravelle as Clifford
- Oliver Maltman as Harrison
- Charley Palmer Rothwell as Leigh Dutot
- Shannon Tarbet as Polly
- Olwen Fouéré as Theresa Kelly
- Tim Woodward as Fletcher
- Imogen de Ste Croix as Melissa

== Production ==
The story was inspired by the true crimes of the serial rapist Edward Paisnel (1925–1994), also known as 'The Beast of Jersey'.

== Release ==
Altitude Film Distribution acquired the distribution rights for the UK. Beast had a limited theatrical release in the UK on 27 April 2018.

30West acquired the North American distribution rights to Beast four days after its Toronto International Film Festival premiere and released the film in the United States in partnership with Roadside Attractions on 11 May 2018, after screening at the 2018 Sundance Film Festival in that country.

=== Critical reception ===
The film has received a positive critical response. On review aggregator website Rotten Tomatoes, the film has an approval rating of 92% based on 142 reviews, and an average rating of 7.28/10. The website's critical consensus reads, "Beast plays like bleak poetry, unfurling its psychological thrills while guided by its captivating leads and mesmerizing, visceral visuals." On Metacritic, the film has a weighted average score of 74 out of 100, based on 19 critics, indicating "generally favorable reviews".

For The Canadian Press, David Friend called it "a twisty story about the monster that lies within all of us, and struggle to keep it contained." Peter Howell of the Toronto Star said it was "a jagged but memorable feature... that slowly yields its truths."

=== Accolades ===
Award	Date of ceremony	Category	Recipient(s)	Result	Ref.
British Academy Film Awards	10 February 2019	Best British Film	Kristian Brodie, Lauren Dark & Ivana MacKinnon	Nominated	
British Academy Film Awards	10 February 2019	Debut by a British Writer/Director/Producer	Michael Pearce & Lauren Dark	Won	
