= The Bride! =

2026 film by Maggie Gyllenhaal

- Theatrical release poster
- Directed by: Maggie Gyllenhaal
- Written by: Maggie Gyllenhaal
- Based on: Frankenstein; or, The Modern Prometheus by Mary Shelley
- Produced by: Maggie Gyllenhaal; Emma Tillinger Koskoff; Talia Kleinhendler; Osnat Handelsman-Keren
- Starring: Jessie Buckley; Christian Bale; Peter Sarsgaard; Annette Bening; Jake Gyllenhaal; Penélope Cruz
- Cinematography: Lawrence Sher
- Edited by: Dylan Tichenor
- Music by: Hildur Guðnadóttir
- Production companies: First Love Films; In the Current Company
- Distributed by: Warner Bros. Pictures
- Release dates: February 26, 2026 (Leicester Square); March 6, 2026 (United States)
- Running time: 126 minutes
- Country: United States
- Language: English
- Budget: $80–90 million
- Box office: $24 million

The Bride! is a 2026 American gothic romance film directed and written by Maggie Gyllenhaal and starring Jessie Buckley (in a dual role), Christian Bale, Peter Sarsgaard, Annette Bening, Jake Gyllenhaal, and Penélope Cruz. The film draws inspiration from the 1935 film Bride of Frankenstein, which was based on Mary Shelley's 1818 novel Frankenstein; or, The Modern Prometheus, as it tells the story of Frankenstein's monster enlisting a scientist to reanimate a bride for him. Once that was done, Frankenstein's monster and his bride run work to avoid a crime boss's underlings and the police.

The Bride! had its world premiere at the Empire Leicester Square in London, on February 26, 2026. It was released in the United States by Warner Bros. Pictures on March 6. The film received mixed reviews and was a commercial failure, grossing $24 million worldwide on a budget of $90 million.

== Plot ==
Speaking from the afterlife, Mary Shelley says she has a story she wanted to tell after Frankenstein, but could not because of her death. To tell it, she possesses Ida, a woman living in 1936 Chicago, who in her trance publicly discusses the criminal activities of the crime boss Vito Lupino. Lupino's henchmen Clyde and James discreetly take her aside, pushing her down a flight of stairs to her death.

Elsewhere in Chicago, Frankenstein's monster, AKA "Frank", arrives at the house of scientist Dr. Cornelia Euphronius. Having read about Euphronius' work on reanimation, he enlists her to create a companion for him after a century of loneliness. Euphronius and Frank choose Ida's corpse and successfully revive her, but she loses her memory in the process. Frank takes advantage of this and states that she is his bride and lost her memory in an accident.

Frank and Ida see a movie featuring Frank's favorite actor Ronnie Reed and then go dancing at a club. As they leave, two men attempt to assault her, and Frank kills them. Frank tells her to leave him, but she decides to run away with him. They stow away in a train to New York City, killing a police officer who discovers them after Shelley causes her to have an outburst. Meanwhile, Detective Jake Wiles and his assistant, Myrna Malloy, investigate the murders and eventually follow them to New York.

While the pair are in hiding, Frank tells her that her name is Penelope Rogers. Penelope causes chaos in a screening of Revolt of the Zombies and they seek refuge from the police and an angry mob at a high-class party. Frank runs into Ronnie Reed and expresses his adoration, but is dismissed. Frank begins to dance like Reed does in his films, Penelope joining him, as do party-goers possessed by Mary Shelley. Detective Wiles and the police arrive at the party, but they fall back when Penelope holds Reed at gunpoint and calls out men in attendance for abusing women. Wiles recognizes her real identity as Ida. Penelope kills a police officer, and she and Frank escape the city in a stolen car.

Penelope and Frank's crime spree becomes well publicized, and Lupino recognizes her in a newspaper. He executes James for failing to silence her and dispatches Clyde to kill her again, ordering Clyde to bring him her tongue as proof of death, to add his collection of victims' tongues that he keeps in jars. Meanwhile, Malloy makes a connection between reports of murders and sightings of the pair in cities where Reed's films were set. This prompts Malloy and Wiles to travel to Niagara Falls, where they find the couple. Wiles confronts them and informs Penelope of her previous identity as Ida before she shoots him in the foot. Fleeing, an angered Penelope takes the injured Frank to a drive-in, where he tells her the truth of her origins.

Wiles explains to Malloy that he and Ida were planning to take down Lupino and expresses guilt that his inaction led to her death. He decides to retire and promotes Malloy as his replacement. Malloy tracks the couple to the drive-in. Frank apologizes for his actions and affirms his love for Penelope/Ida, who decides to call herself the Bride. As he proposes, Clyde fatally shoots him, but the Bride escapes with Frank's body, returning to Euphronius' laboratory, followed by Malloy.

Euphronius refuses to reanimate Frank, saying that her attempts to reanimate her husband went wrong, leading her to have to kill him. Clyde breaks into the laboratory and fatally shoots the Bride before fleeing. The police arrive and Malloy orders them to search for Clyde, leaving Euphronius with the Bride's and Frank's corpses. Encouraged by Malloy and Shelley, Euphronius decides to revive the couple. Outside, the police arrest Clyde. Malloy sees bright lights shine from the laboratory. Inside, the revived corpses hold hands.

During the credits, Lupino and those involved are apprehended by Wiles and Bride-inspired female rioters with his tongue jars smashed.

== Cast ==
- Jessie Buckley as:
  - Ida / Penelope Rogers / The Bride, a woman brought back from the dead
  - Mary Shelley, the ghost of the author of Frankenstein who narrates from the afterlife
- Christian Bale as "Frank", a simulacrum creature created by Dr. Frankenstein
- Peter Sarsgaard as Jake Wiles, a police detective who investigates Frank and the Bride
- Annette Bening as Dr. Cornelia Euphronious, a scientist who assists Frank and is familiar with the work of Dr. Victor Frankenstein
- Jake Gyllenhaal as Ronnie Reed, a popular Hollywood actor idolized by Frank
- Penélope Cruz as Myrna Malloy, Jake's secretary
- John Magaro as Clyde, a gang member
- Matthew Maher as James, a gang member
- Zlatko Burić as Vito Lupino, a crime boss who Clyde and James work for
- Jeannie Berlin as Greta, Euphronious' maid
- Julianne Hough as Iris / Jinx, a Hollywood actress who co-stars in Reed's films
- Louis Cancelmi as Officer Goodman, a police officer who crosses paths with Frank and the Bride

Swedish musician Fever Ray makes a cameo appearance in the film, performing music from the soundtrack.

== Production ==
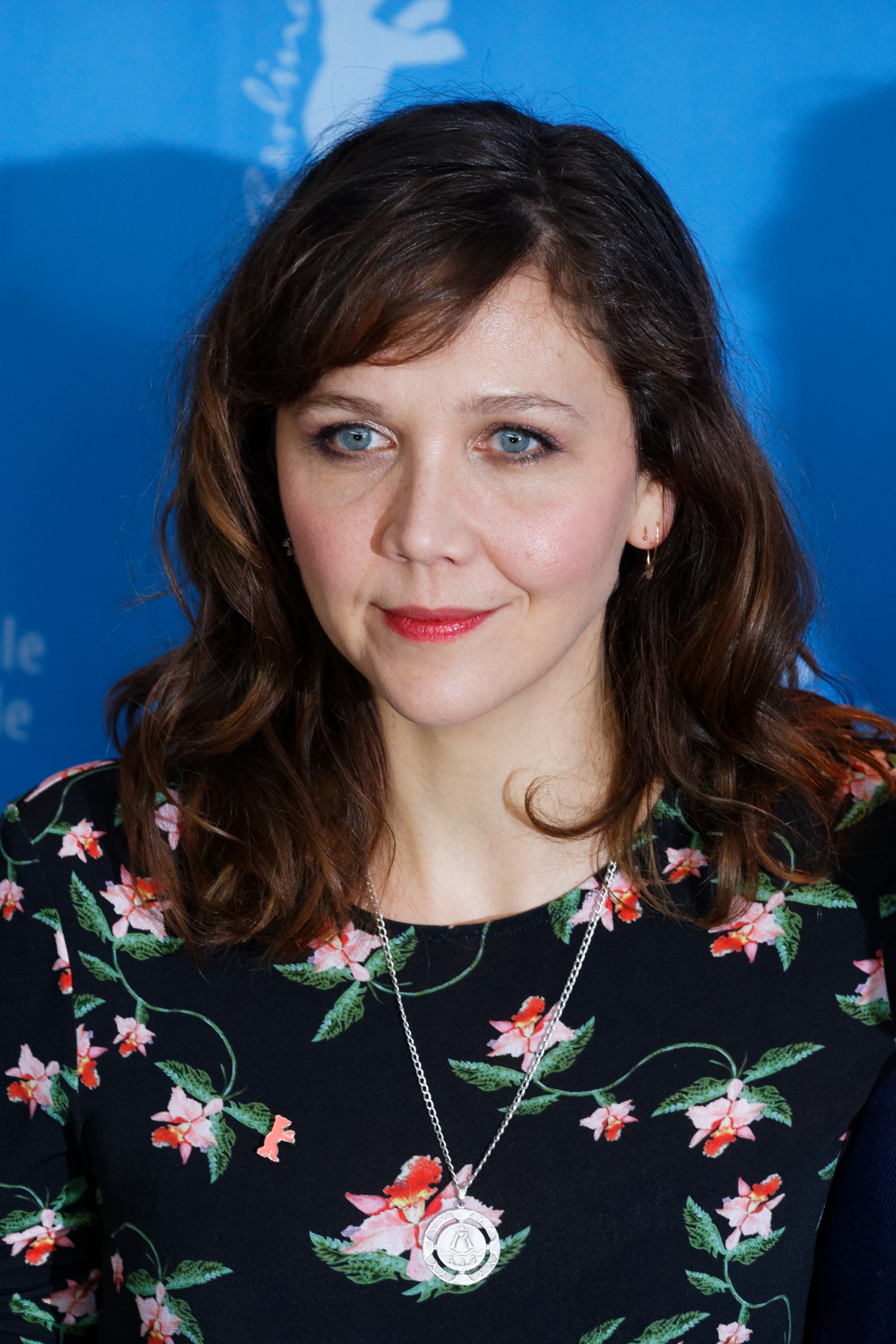
The Bride! is the second feature film written and directed by Maggie Gyllenhaal.

In August 2023, the weekly issue of Production Weekly reported a forthcoming remake of the 1935 film The Bride of Frankenstein from Netflix, written and directed by Maggie Gyllenhaal and starring Penélope Cruz, Christian Bale, and Peter Sarsgaard (Gyllenhaal's husband). In January 2024, it was announced that Warner Bros. Pictures was producing the film and Annette Bening had joined its ensemble cast, which included Jessie Buckley (who starred in Gyllenhaal's feature directorial debut, The Lost Daughter, in 2021) as "the star of the movie", alongside Bale, Cruz, and Sarsgaard. According to Deadline Hollywood, Bale and Buckley were "circling this project well before the strikes". In March 2024, Julianne Hough came on board to star, with John Magaro and Jeannie Berlin joining the following month. In June, Jake Gyllenhaal, Maggie's brother, revealed he would also star.

In August 2024, The Wall Street Journal reported that Michael De Luca and Pamela Abdy, co-chairs and CEOs of the Warner Bros. motion picture unit, with "a reputation in Hollywood for being talent whisperers with a willingness to spend", had "stepped in to foot the bill" after Netflix left the project (which included a disagreement over Gyllenhaal wanting to film in New York while Netflix pushed for New Jersey because it would be cheaper), adding that "The movie's costs, including production and marketing, will likely exceed $100 million." Gyllenhaal emphasized the creative freedom granted to her by De Luca and Abdy. The film's official title includes an exclamation point, which Gyllenhaal said she had absentmindedly added because she "wanted to be a little wild"; Time magazine found this to be "annoyingly emphatic" and "emblematic of the movie's overkill".

Principal photography was scheduled to begin on March 4, 2024, in New York City. Cinematographer Lawrence Sher shot the film entirely with IMAX-certified digital cameras, marking his first collaboration with Gyllenhaal. Sher primarily shot The Bride! with the Sony Venice 2 digital camera while the Sony FX3 was used for select shots. The film's main aspect ratio is 2:39:1 which expands into 1:43:1 and 1:90:1 aspect ratios in the IMAX format. In January 2025, Deadline reported the film's budget as $80 million.

Editing was completed by Dylan Tichenor. Gyllenhaal cut some violent sequences, including those of sexual violence, from the film in response to negative test screenings; one particular moment cut involved Frankenstein licking black vomit off the Bride's neck. The score was composed by Hildur Guðnadóttir, who replaced the previously announced Jonny Greenwood. Swedish musician Fever Ray composed two songs for the soundtrack and appears in the film.

== Release ==
=== Theatrical ===
The Bride! had its world premiere at the Empire Leicester Square in London, on February 26, 2026. It was first released in France and South Korea on March 4, 2026, and in the United States on March 6, 2026, in IMAX. It was previously scheduled for release on October 3, 2025, and September 26, 2025.

=== Home media ===
The Bride! was released on digital streaming on April 7, 2026, and on 4K Ultra HD Blu-ray, Blu-ray, and DVD on May 19, 2026.

== Reception ==
=== Box office ===
The Bride! grossed $13 million in the United States and Canada and $11 million in other territories, for a worldwide total of $24 million. Multiple publications labeled the film a box office bomb, with projected losses for Warner Bros. reaching as much as $100 million.

In the United States and Canada, The Bride! was projected to gross $16–18 million from 3,304 theaters during its opening weekend. The film earned $3 million on its opening day, including $1 million from Thursday previews. It ultimately only grossed $7.3 million in the United States and Canada in its opening weekend, where it placed third behind Hoppers and second-week holdover Scream 7, and $6.3 million elsewhere for a worldwide gross of $13.6 million. The low figures were attributed to the film's limited appeal, high production costs, and negative word-of-mouth. In its second weekend, it dropped 70% and grossed $2.1 million domestically.

=== Critical response ===
Metacritic review
breakdown (unweighted)

Positive
24 (44%)
Mixed
24 (44%)
Negative
7 (13%)

On the review aggregator website Rotten Tomatoes, 57% of 335 critics' reviews are positive, with an average rating of 5.8/10. The website's consensus reads: "Concocted with all the restraint of a mad scientist's experiment, The Bride! lurches in so many different creative directions that the overall effect is both sloppy and inspired." Metacritic, which uses a weighted average, assigned the film a score of 55 out of 100, based on 55 critics, indicating "mixed or average" reviews. Audiences polled by CinemaScore gave the film an average grade of "C+" on an A+ to F scale.

The Guardian's reviewer Peter Bradshaw gave the film four stars out of five and wrote, "Jessie Buckley is electrifying as frizzy-haired, black-tongued monster's wife". In a two out of five review, Donald Clarke of The Irish Times stated that "it is loud. It is brash. It is willfully discordant. But it also, alas, exhibits a contrasting strain of clunkiness that would be more at home in an undergraduate revue". Owen Gleiberman of Variety considered it to be "like [Joker: Folie à Deux] starring a grunge version of the Munsters, with dollops of Sid and Nancy and Natural Born Killers. Except that the movie doesn't move". In an explainer for MovieWeb, J.E. Reich concluded that The Bride! could be best understood by accepting that "in Gyllenhaal's movie, the world operates on a single infuriating piece of tautology [in that the] stories we read or see on screen are lies, but they also mimic the stories we base our lives on [...] stories are lies and lies are stories, and it's enough to drive us beyond the brink". Writing for Empire, Leila Latif was less enthused, concluding, "ultimately what the film most exudes is incompetence" and calling it "a hot mess" and "a crushing disappointment". Other critics shared a similar view of the film. Stephanie Zacharek of Time described the film as "an intellectual joyride without the joy". Richard Brody of The New Yorker stated that "the movie has the form of mismatched pieces stitched together and brought to life more willfully than coherently".

=== Accolades ===
Award	Date of ceremony	Category	Nominee(s)	Result	Ref.
Critics' Choice Super Awards	August 6, 2026	Best Actress in a Horror Movie	Jessie Buckley	Nominated	
Fangoria Chainsaw Awards	October 25, 2026	Best Wide Release	The Bride!	Nominated	
Fangoria Chainsaw Awards	October 25, 2026	Best Director	Maggie Gyllenhaal	Nominated	
Fangoria Chainsaw Awards	October 25, 2026	Best Lead Performance	Jessie Buckley	Nominated	
Fangoria Chainsaw Awards	October 25, 2026	Best Costume Design	Sandy Powell	Nominated	
Fangoria Chainsaw Awards	October 25, 2026	Best Makeup FX	Chris Gallaher, Nadia Stacey, and Scott Stoddard	Nominated	
Golden Trailer Awards	May 28, 2026	Best Motion / Title Graphics	"Help!" Teaser (Warner Bros. Pictures / Major Major)	Nominated	

== See also ==
- List of films featuring Frankenstein's monster
