= Men (2022 film) =

2022 film by Alex Garland

- Theatrical release poster
- Directed by: Alex Garland
- Written by: Alex Garland
- Produced by: Andrew Macdonald; Allon Reich
- Starring: Jessie Buckley; Rory Kinnear
- Cinematography: Rob Hardy
- Edited by: Jake Roberts
- Music by: Ben Salisbury; Geoff Barrow
- Production company: DNA Films
- Distributed by: Entertainment Film Distributors
- Release dates: 20 May 2022 (United States); 1 June 2022 (United Kingdom)
- Running time: 100 minutes
- Country: United Kingdom
- Language: English
- Box office: $11.2 million

Men is a 2022 British surrealist folk horror film written and directed by Alex Garland. It stars Jessie Buckley as a widow who travels on holiday to a countryside village but becomes disturbed and tormented by the strange men in the village, all portrayed by Rory Kinnear. The film was released in the United States on 20 May 2022 by A24 and in the United Kingdom on 1 June 2022 by Entertainment Film Distributors. It received generally positive reviews from critics, though its narrative approach received some criticism.

== Plot ==
Following the apparent suicide of her husband James, Harper Marlowe decides to spend a holiday alone in the Herefordshire village of Cotson. Flashbacks reveal that Harper, tired of James's emotional abuse and manipulation, intended to divorce him. James threatened suicide in response. After James hit Harper in the face, she angrily locked him out of the flat. She then witnessed him fall from an upstairs balcony to his death, being partially impaled by a fence.

Upon arriving at the country house she is renting, Harper is greeted by its eccentric but well-meaning owner, Geoffrey, who gives her a tour of the house. Harper later goes for a walk in the nearby woods and comes across a disused railway tunnel. At the other end, a human figure begins screaming and running towards her. Frightened, Harper runs back through the forest until she reaches an open field. She turns back to photograph the landscape on her phone and notices a naked man standing in the distance, watching her.

The next day, during a video call with her friend Riley, Harper spots the same naked man in the front garden, his face covered with bloody scratches, further disturbing her. Realising that the front door is ajar, Harper quickly shuts and locks it, but the naked man sticks his hand through the letter box. Harper calls the police and the man is arrested, with one of the arresting officers resembling Geoffrey.

Harper visits a church, where images of the Green Man and Sheela na gig are carved on a font. Outside, she meets a young boy and a vicar who both bear a likeness to Geoffrey. After the boy leaves, Harper discusses James's death with the vicar, who suggests that she is partially responsible for James's death because she did not allow him to apologise. An enraged Harper leaves and later goes to a local pub, where she encounters Geoffrey again. The few patrons and the bartender all bear Geoffrey's appearance. His policeman lookalike arrives shortly afterwards, informing Harper that the naked man has been released in the absence of any legal ground to keep him detained, to her chagrin.

Distressed by the recent events, Harper contacts Riley, who offers to drive to the village in the morning to accompany Harper for the rest of her holiday. As Harper attempts to text Riley the address, her mobile phone's service is repeatedly interrupted. She sees the policeman outside, but as the lights flicker, he disappears. One of the pub's patrons then appears and chases Harper, who retreats into the house. As she arms herself with a knife, a window breaks in the kitchen. Geoffrey arrives and finds that the window broke due to a crow, which he then euthanises by breaking its neck.

As Geoffrey goes into the garden, the lights flicker again and the naked man emerges, chasing Harper back into the house. When he reaches through the letter box and grabs Harper's hand, she stabs him through the arm. He pulls his arm out, the stuck knife ripping his arm in an extreme injury resembling the one James sustained during his fall. Both the boy and the vicar appear inside the house in turn, each of them now similarly injured. When the vicar attempts to rape Harper, she stabs him in the stomach and escapes the house.

While attempting to drive away, Harper accidentally runs over Geoffrey. He aggressively pulls Harper out of her car, takes control of it and chases her before crashing into a stone wall. The naked man, now in full Green Man form, approaches Harper, his ankle now severely broken and matching another injury on James's corpse. The naked man gives birth to the young boy, who in turn gives birth to the vicar, then Geoffrey, and finally James, heavily mutilating their bodies. Both Harper and James sit on a sofa inside the house. When Harper asks him what he wants from her, James responds that he wants her love. Riley—who is pregnant—arrives at the house in the morning. She follows a blood trail and finds Harper, who smiles when she sees her.

== Cast ==
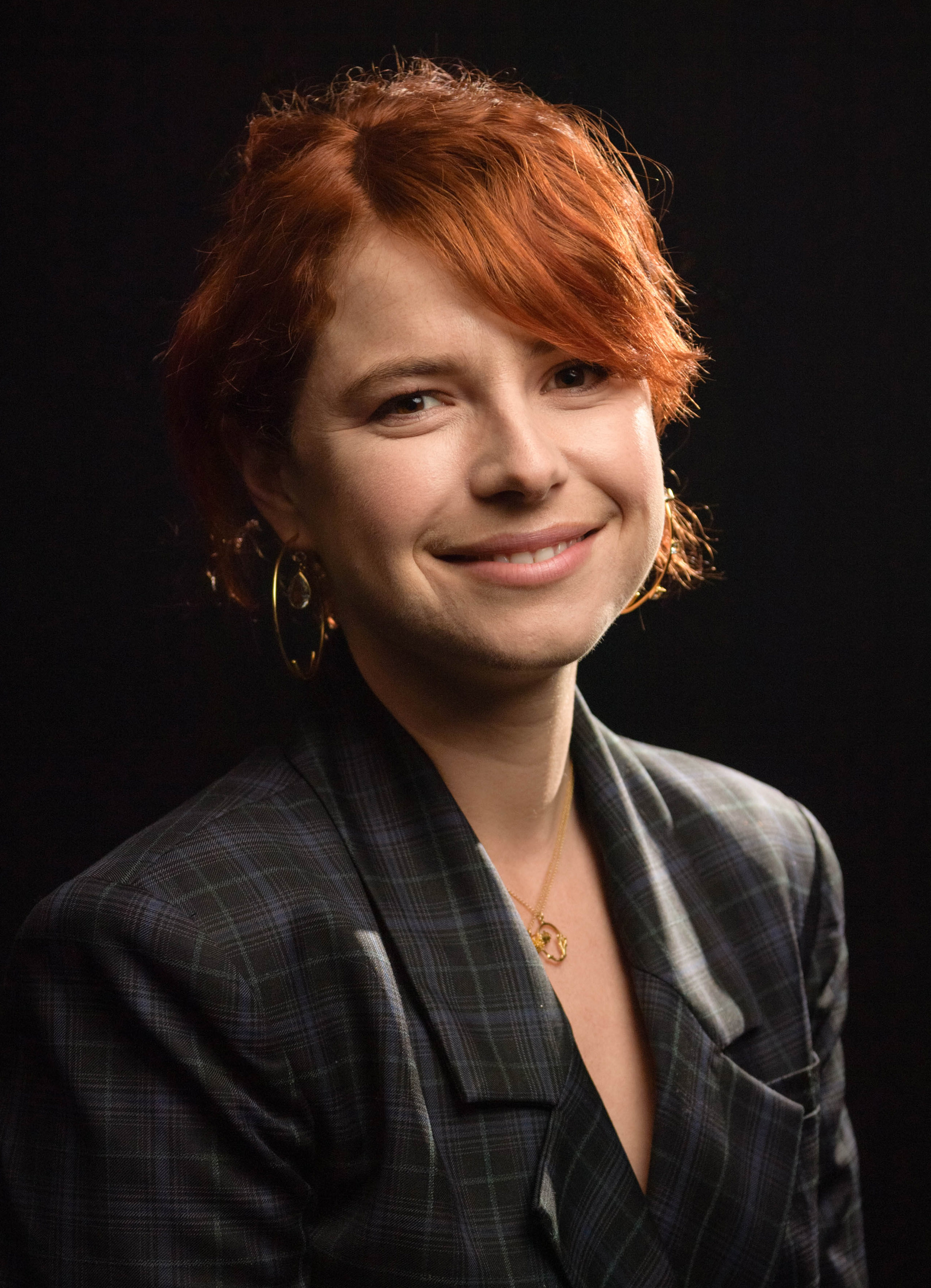
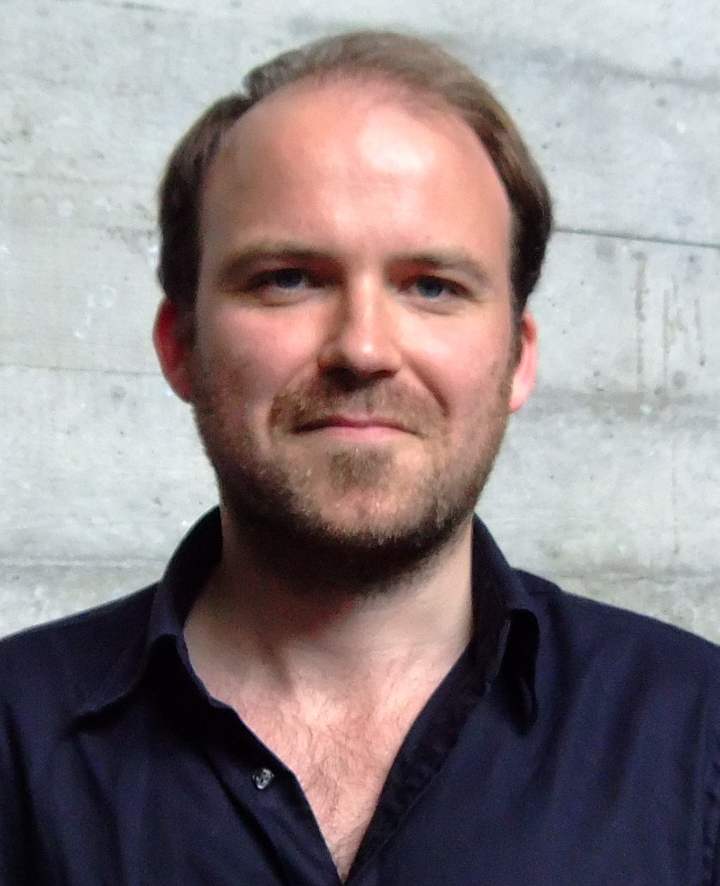
Jessie Buckley (left) stars as a terrorised widow. The men she encounters while on holiday are all played by Rory Kinnear (right).
- Jessie Buckley as Harper Marlowe, a woman who goes on holiday after a tragic incident
- Rory Kinnear as Geoffrey, the owner of the holiday house Harper rents. Kinnear also portrays the numerous "men" in the village that Harper visits (such as the naked man, the vicar, the pub owner, the police officer, Samuel's face and the two pub patrons).
  - Zak Rothera-Oxley as the body of Samuel, standing in for Kinnear
- Paapa Essiedu as James Marlowe, Harper's late husband
- Gayle Rankin as Riley, Harper's friend who speaks to her over the phone
- Sarah Twomey as Frieda, a friendly police officer
- Sonoya Mizuno as police operator (voice only)

== Production ==
On 6 January 2021, it was announced that Alex Garland would write and direct a film for A24, his second following Ex Machina, with Jessie Buckley and Rory Kinnear in talks to star. Regarding additional casting, The Sunday Times reported Paapa Essiedu rehearsing with Buckley and Kinnear.

Principal photography began on 19 March 2021 and was expected to conclude on 19 May, in the United Kingdom, specifically St Katharine Docks, London, and parts of Gloucestershire, including Withington, standing in for Cotson; and a tunnel in the Forest of Dean. On 22 May 2021, cinematographer Rob Hardy said filming had wrapped.

== Release ==
Men was released in the United States on 20 May 2022 by A24 and in the United Kingdom on 1 June by Entertainment Film Distributors. It screened at the Cannes Film Festival in the Directors' Fortnight section on 22 May 2022. It was also selected as opening film at 26th Bucheon International Fantastic Film Festival to be screened on 7 July 2022. It was released on VOD by Lionsgate Home Entertainment on 19 July 2022.

== Reception ==
=== Box office ===
Men grossed $7.6 million in the United States and Canada, and $3.6 million in other territories for a worldwide total of $11.2 million.

In North America, the film was released alongside Downton Abbey: A New Era in 2,212 theaters. It made $3.3 million in its opening weekend, finishing fifth at the box office. It then earned $1.2 million in its second weekend, finishing ninth, before dropping out of the box office top ten in its third weekend.

=== Critical response ===
On the review aggregator website Rotten Tomatoes, 69% of 271 critics' reviews are positive, with an average rating of 6.60/10. The website's consensus reads: "If its narrative and thematic reach sometimes exceeds its grasp, magnetic performances from a stellar cast help Men make the most of its horror provocations." Metacritic, which uses a weighted average, assigned the film a score of 65 out of 100, based on 55 critics, indicating "generally favorable" reviews. Audiences polled by CinemaScore gave the film an average grade of "D+" on an A+ to F scale, while PostTrak reported 52% of audience members gave it a positive score, with 30% saying they would definitely recommend it.

Mark Kermode of The Observer gave the film 3/5 stars, calling it "a playfully twisted affair – not quite as profound as it seems to think, perhaps, but boasting enough squishy metaphorical slime to ensure that its musings upon textbook male characteristics are rarely dull, and sometimes deliciously disgusting." Peter Bradshaw of The Guardian also gave it 3/5 stars, calling it "an unsubtle and schematic but very well-acted Brit folk-horror pastiche". Christy Lemire of RogerEbert.com gave it 3/4 stars, calling it "a visceral experience" and adding: "it reinforces Garland's singular prowess as a craftsman of indelible visuals and gripping mood." David Rooney of The Hollywood Reporter wrote: "Riveting performances from Jessie Buckley and a truly chameleonic Rory Kinnear make this A24 conversation-starter an unconventional genre standout." A few critics have placed the emphasis on toxic masculinity, so much so that Richard Roeper of Chicago Sun-Times argued that "at times it feels as if Harper is trapped in a maze like she's in The Shining."

Kevin Maher of The Times gave it 2/5 stars, writing: "It culminates in a protracted, effects-filled birthing sequence that manages, after 90 minutes of man-hating, to be aggressively misogynistic." Clarisse Loughrey of The Independent also gave it 2/5 stars, writing: "It suggests that all a male filmmaker needs to do to earn his feminist credentials is to show us men doing bad things." K. Austin Collins of Rolling Stone wrote: "Too much is spent reiterating certain gore-ish thrills and slick political points that really don't benefit from the added scrutiny encouraged by repetition; even the grand, ecstatic, pathetic feat of the movie's climax fizzles rather than simmers." Armond White of National Review wrote: "Despite its hallucinatory finale, Men is not really an examination of spousal guilt or women's fearful psychology... Plus, it's too absurd to substantiate the media's fascination with 'toxic masculinity.'" Jonathan Rosenbaum for the La International Cinéfila Poll placed the film on his "Best Films of 2022" list.

== Accolades ==
Award	Date of ceremony	Category	Recipient(s)	Result	Ref.
British Independent Film Awards	4 December 2022	Best Joint Lead Performance	Jessie Buckley and Rory Kinnear	Nominated	
British Independent Film Awards	4 December 2022	Cinematography	Rob Hardy	Nominated	
British Independent Film Awards	4 December 2022	Best Effects	David Simpson	Won	
British Independent Film Awards	4 December 2022	Best Original Music	Ben Salisbury, Geoff Barrow	Nominated	
British Independent Film Awards	4 December 2022	Best Sound	Glenn Freemantle, Ben Barker, Gillian Dodders, Howard Bargoff, Mitch Low	Nominated	
St. Louis Gateway Film Critics Association	18 December 2022	Best Horror Film	Men	Nominated	
Critics' Choice Super Awards	16 March 2023	Best Actress in a Horror Movie	Jessie Buckley	Nominated	
Critics' Choice Super Awards	16 March 2023	Best Actor in a Horror Movie	Rory Kinnear	Nominated	
