= Wild Rose (2018 film) =

- Theatrical release poster
- Directed by: Tom Harper
- Written by: Nicole Taylor
- Produced by: Faye Ward
- Starring: Jessie Buckley; Sophie Okonedo; Julie Walters
- Cinematography: George Steel
- Edited by: Mark Eckersley
- Music by: Jack Arnold
- Production companies: Fable Pictures; Creative Scotland; Film4; BFI
- Distributed by: Entertainment One
- Release dates: 8 September 2018 (TIFF); 12 April 2019 (United Kingdom)
- Running time: 101 minutes
- Countries: Canada; United Kingdom
- Language: English
- Box office: $7.1 million

Wild Rose is a 2018 musical drama film directed by Tom Harper and starring Jessie Buckley, Julie Walters, Sophie Okonedo, Jamie Sives, Craig Parkinson, James Harkness, Janey Godley, Daisy Littlefield, Ryan Kerr, Adam Mitchell, and Nicole Kerr. The screenplay was written by Nicole Taylor.

The film had its world premiere at the Toronto International Film Festival on 8 September 2018 and was released on 12 April 2019, by Entertainment One in the United Kingdom.

The film received positive reviews, with Buckley earning a nomination for the BAFTA Award for Best Actress in a Leading Role for her performance. A stage musical based on the film, received its world premiere in March 2025 at the Royal Lyceum Theatre in Edinburgh.

== Plot ==
Rose-Lynn Harlan, an aspiring country singer and single mother of two from Glasgow, is released after a year in prison for throwing a package of heroin over the wall into HM Prison Cornton Vale. Having lost her job in the house band at Glasgow's Grand Ole Opry, Rose-Lynn's mother Marion tells her to abandon her musical dreams and focus on work and taking care of her children, whom Marion has been left caring for.

Rose-Lynn takes a cleaning job at Susannah's large house. Rose-Lynn asks Susannah for money to travel to Nashville to try to make it as a musician, but she declines. Instead, she contacts BBC Radio presenter, Bob Harris, sending him a recording of Rose-Lynn singing. When he offers to meet her in London, Rose-Lynn has her probationary curfew lifted and sits in on a live performance by Ashley McBryde at Broadcasting House. Harris encourages her to keep performing and figure out what she wants to say by writing her own songs.

Susannah hires Rose-Lynn to perform at a house party, where she will crowdfund Rose-Lynn's Nashville trip. Marion refuses to cancel holiday plans to watch the children, Wynonna and Lyle, during the week of rehearsals leading up to the party. Rose-Lynn shuttles the kids to various friends instead. The day before the performance, Susannah's husband confronts Rose-Lynn about her criminal conviction and his intention to terminate her employment after her performance.

Lyle breaks his arm while briefly left unattended at home, and the doctors can't put a cast on until after Rose-Lynn's planned performance. Marion arrives to help, and Rose-Lynn begs her to watch her son so she can get to the party. Marion reluctantly agrees and criticises her strongly for neglecting her family. Rose-Lynn rushes to the performance but breaks down on taking the stage. She confesses to Susannah her guilt for her criminal behaviour and not being there for her children, and her belief that her conviction and family responsibilities are permanent barriers to her musical dream, then leaves. Rose-Lynn gets a job as a waitress and dedicates herself to her children. Marion, seeing that Rose-Lynn has accepted her responsibilities, presents her a large sum of money she's saved, enough to travel to Nashville. Marion convinces her to take it by expressing her regret about failing to accomplish her own goals due to having children.

Rose-Lynn travels to Nashville and learns how difficult it is to find work and get noticed. She sneaks on stage at the Ryman Auditorium during a backstage tour and sings an impromptu song to the empty building. A security guard offers to introduce her to a record producer, but Rose-Lynn decides to return to Glasgow, realising her future lies in her home town.

One year later, Rose-Lynn performs an original song at Celtic Connections titled “Glasgow (No Place Like Home)”, receiving raucous applause. Bob Harris, Susannah, and her children are in the audience.

== Cast ==
- Jessie Buckley as Rose-Lynn Harlan
- Julie Walters as Marion
- Sophie Okonedo as Susannah
- Jamie Sives as Sam
- Craig Parkinson as Alan
- James Harkness as Elliot
- Janey Godley as Barmaid
- Daisy Littlefield as Wynonna
- Adam Mitchell as Lyle
- Ryan Kerr as Rory
- Nicole Kerr as Nell

The film also features cameo appearances from Kacey Musgraves, Ashley McBryde and Bob Harris.

== Release ==
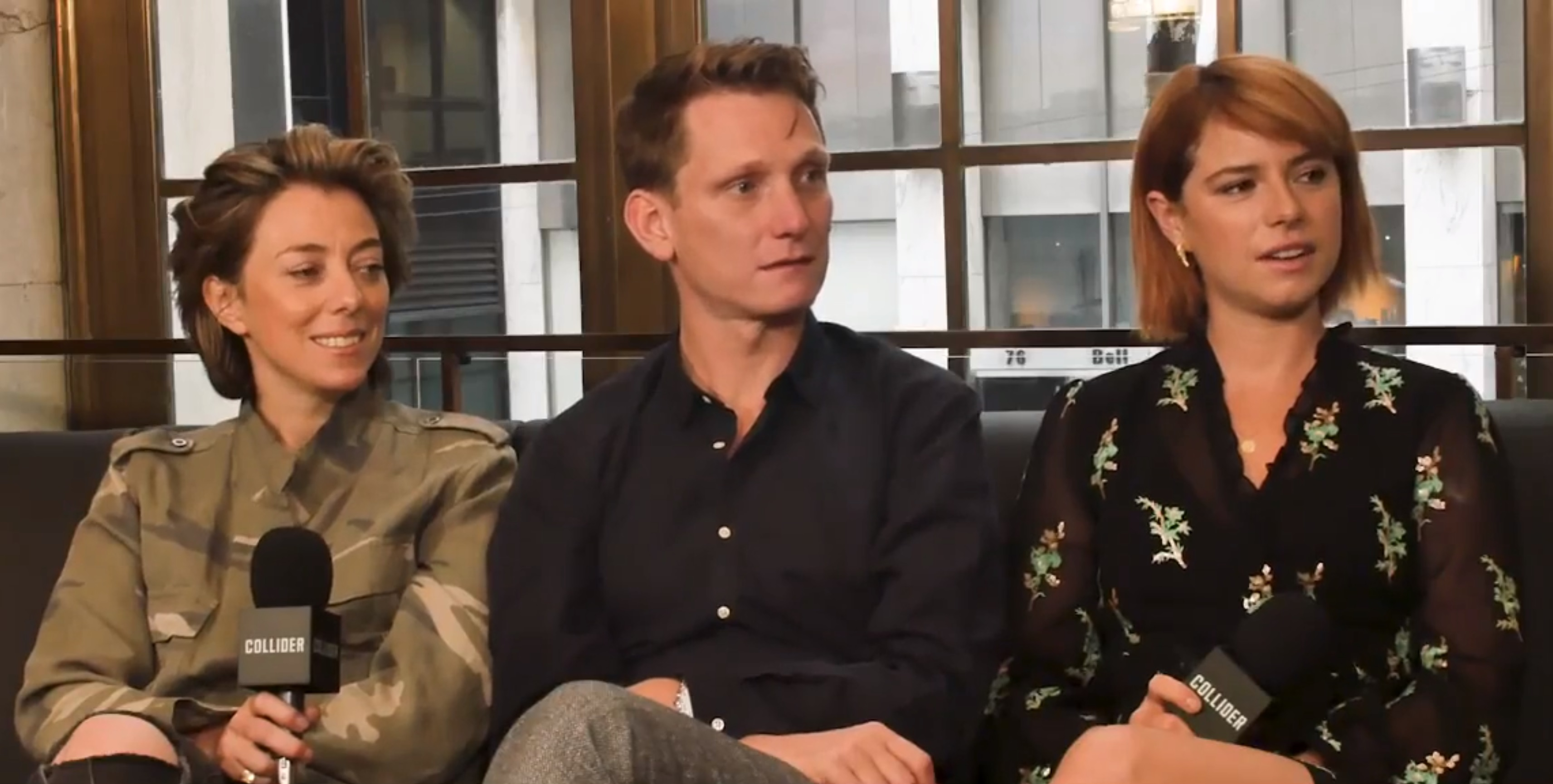
(L-R) Nicole Taylor, Tom Harper, and Jessie Buckley discuss the film in 2018

The film had its world premiere at the Toronto International Film Festival on 8 September 2018. Shortly after, Neon acquired U.S. distribution rights to the film. It screened at the BFI London Film Festival on 15 October 2018 and at South by Southwest in March 2019. It was released in the United Kingdom on 12 April 2019, by Entertainment One and in the United States on 21 June 2019 by Neon.

== Reception ==
Wild Rose received positive reviews from film critics. It has a 92% approval from 194 critic reviews on Rotten Tomatoes, with an average of 7.8/10. The site's consensus reads: "There's no shortage of star-is-born stories, but Wild Rose proves they can still be thoroughly entertaining -- and marks its own transcendent moment for lead Jessie Buckley." Metacritic reports a score of 80/100, based on 32 critics, indicating "Generally favorable reviews".

=== Accolades ===
Year	Award	Category	Nominated work	Result
2020	British Academy Film Awards	Best Actress in a Leading Role	Jessie Buckley	Nominated
2020	Critics' Choice Awards	Best Original Song	"Glasgow (No Place Like Home)"	Won (Note: Tied with (I'm Gonna) Love Me Again for Rocketman.)
2020	British Academy Scotland Awards	Best Feature Film	Wild Rose	Won
2020	British Academy Scotland Awards	Best Actress - Film	Jessie Buckley	Won
2020	British Independent Film Awards	Best British Independent Film	Wild Rose	Nominated
2020	British Independent Film Awards	Best Actress	Jessie Buckley	Nominated
2020	British Independent Film Awards	Best Supporting Actress	Julie Walters	Nominated
2020	British Independent Film Awards	Best Music	Jack Arnold	Won
2020	British Independent Film Awards	Best Screenplay	Nicole Taylor	Nominated
2020	British Independent Film Awards	Best Debut Screenwriter	Nicole Taylor	Nominated
2020	British Independent Film Awards	Best Casting	Kahleen Crawford	Nominated
2020	British Independent Film Awards	Best Costume Design	Anna Robbins	Nominated
2020	British Independent Film Awards	Best Make Up & Hair Design	Jody Williams	Nominated
2020	British Independent Film Awards	Best Sound	Lee Walpole, Colin Nicolson & Stuart Hilliker	Nominated
2020	National Board of Review	Top Ten Independent Films	Wild Rose	Won
2020	Gold Derby Awards	Best Original Song	"Glasgow (No Place Like Home)"	Nominated
2020	Hollywood Critics Association	Best Original Song	"Glasgow (No Place Like Home)"	Won
2020	Hollywood Critics Association	Breakthrough Performance - Actress	Jessie Buckley	Won
2020	London Film Critics Circle Awards	British/Irish Film of the Year	Wild Rose	Nominated
2020	London Film Critics Circle Awards	British/Irish Actress of the Year	Jessie Buckley	Nominated
2020	London Film Critics Circle Awards	Breakthrough British/Irish Filmmaker of the Year	Nicole Taylor	Nominated
2020	Houston Film Critics Society Awards	Best Original Song	"Glasgow (No Place Like Home)"	Won
2020	Irish Film & Television Awards	Actress in a leading role	Jessie Buckley	Won
