= Jessie Buckley =

Irish actress and singer (born 1989)

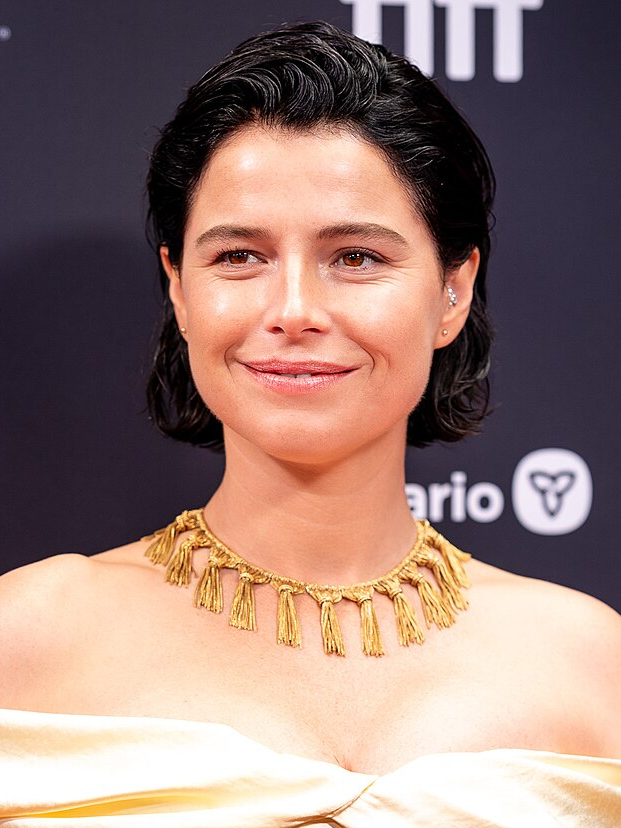
- Buckley in 2025
- Born: 28 December 1989 (age 36); Killarney, County Kerry, Ireland
- Education: Royal Academy of Dramatic Art (BA)
- Occupations: Actress; singer
- Years active: 2008–present
- Spouse: Freddie Sorensen (m. 2023)
- Children: 1
- Relatives: Madge Clifford (great-grandmother)
- Awards: Full list

Jessie Buckley (born 28 December 1989) is an Irish actress and singer. Her accolades include an Academy Award, two BAFTAs, an Actor Award, a Golden Globe Award, a Critics' Choice Award and a Laurence Olivier Award.

Buckley began her acting career in 2008 as a contestant on the BBC talent show I'd Do Anything, in which she came second. A Royal Academy of Dramatic Art graduate, she made her early onscreen appearances in BBC television series such as War & Peace (2016) and Taboo (2017). Buckley made her film debut with the lead role in Beast (2017), followed by her breakthrough role as an aspiring country music singer in the musical film Wild Rose (2018); the latter earned her a nomination for the BAFTA Award for Best Actress in a Leading Role.

Buckley's career progressed with starring roles in films such as I'm Thinking of Ending Things (2020), Men (2022), Women Talking (2022) and Wicked Little Letters (2023). For her performance as a troubled mother in the psychological drama The Lost Daughter (2021), she received nominations for the BAFTA Award for Best Actress in a Supporting Role and for the Academy Award for Best Supporting Actress. She gained further recognition for her portrayal of Agnes Shakespeare in the period drama Hamnet (2025), receiving the Golden Globe, BAFTA Award, Actor Award and Academy Award for Best Actress.

On television, Buckley has starred in the HBO miniseries Chernobyl (2019) and season four of Fargo (2020). On stage, Buckley's portrayal of Sally Bowles in a 2021 West End theatre revival of the musical Cabaret won her the Laurence Olivier Award for Best Actress in a Musical. In 2022, she released the collaborative album For All Our Days That Tear the Heart with Bernard Butler, which was shortlisted for the 2022 Mercury Prize.

== Early life and education ==
Jessie Buckley was born on 28 December 1989 in Killarney, County Kerry, to Marina (née Cassidy) and Tim Buckley. She has a younger brother and three younger sisters. She is the great-granddaughter of Madge Clifford, an Irish republican.

She attended Ursuline Secondary School, an all-girls convent school in Thurles, County Tipperary, where her mother works as a vocal coach and where she performed in school productions. She played a number of male roles at school, including the male lead role of Tony in the musical West Side Story and Freddie Trumper in Chess. She reached grade eight in piano, clarinet and harp at the Royal Irish Academy of Music and was a member of the Tipperary Millennium Orchestra. She attended summer workshops with the Association of Irish Musical Societies (AIMS) to improve her singing and acting. It was there that she was recognised as a talented actress and encouraged to apply for drama school in London. Just before she auditioned for I'd Do Anything, she was turned down by two drama schools, including one the day before her first audition for the show.

Buckley attended the Royal Academy of Dramatic Art (RADA) in London, graduating in January 2013.

== Career ==
=== 2008–2015: I'd Do Anything and work in theatre ===
Buckley began her career as a contestant on I'd Do Anything, a talent show centred on the search for a new, unknown lead to play Nancy in the 2009 West End revival of the British musical Oliver!. She reached the final on 31 May 2008, finishing in second place behind Jodie Prenger. In 2026, Buckley stated she felt "brutalised" and "objectified" during the show due to comments she received from the show's judges, who subjected her to body shaming by making unpleasant jokes about her appearance in front of the cameras and even sending the then 17-year-old to "femininity school" in one of the episodes. In an interview with British Vogue, Buckley said: "I really hope that a 15, 17, whatever-age woman never has to be brutalised quite like what happened on that show. But I didn't recognise it fully at the time. I just felt it, which was difficult."

On 26 August 2008, Buckley performed on Denny Street in Tralee, County Kerry, for RTÉ Radio 1. She followed this with a performance at a charity concert in County Tipperary. On 14 September 2008, Buckley performed at an outdoor concert in celebration of Andrew Lloyd Webber's birthday in Hyde Park, London. She gave a solo rendition of "I Don't Know How To Love Him" from Jesus Christ Superstar and sang "Light at the End of the Tunnel" from Starlight Express with fellow I'd Do Anything finalists Keisha Amponsa-Banson, Niamh Perry and Rachel Tucker, as well as Any Dream Will Do finalists Daniel Boys, Lewis Bradley, Ben James-Ellis and Keith Jack. On 18 September 2008, she and Aoife Mulholland performed with the RTÉ Concert Orchestra at another event held by Lloyd Webber at the National Concert Hall, Dublin.

Buckley was offered the opportunity to understudy for the role of Nancy, but turned it down in favour of another production. On 10 October 2008, it was announced that Buckley would make her Off-West End debut in a revival of the Stephen Sondheim musical A Little Night Music, in the role of Anne Egerman, at the Menier Chocolate Factory, a fringe Studio Theatre, in London from 22 November 2008 to 8 March 2009. She appeared alongside Maureen Lipman and Hannah Waddingham in the production, which was directed by Trevor Nunn. She appeared in a Christmas concert alongside Maria Friedman, Cantabile and Tim Rice in 2009, and in February 2010 she appeared alongside Daniel Boys (and Night Music co-star Kelly Price) in a series of Valentine musical concerts.

After graduating from RADA in January 2013, she worked for Shakespeare's Globe in its 2013 summer season, playing Miranda in The Tempest and singer Arabella Hunt and Kate in Samuel Adamson's Gabriel. In September 2013, Buckley appeared opposite Jude Law in Michael Grandage's West End production of Henry V at the Noël Coward Theatre. She played Perdita in Kenneth Branagh's theatre company production of The Winter's Tale, staged at London's Garrick Theatre in November 2015, which was streamed live to cinemas worldwide on 4 December 2015.

=== 2016–2019: Breakthrough on screen ===
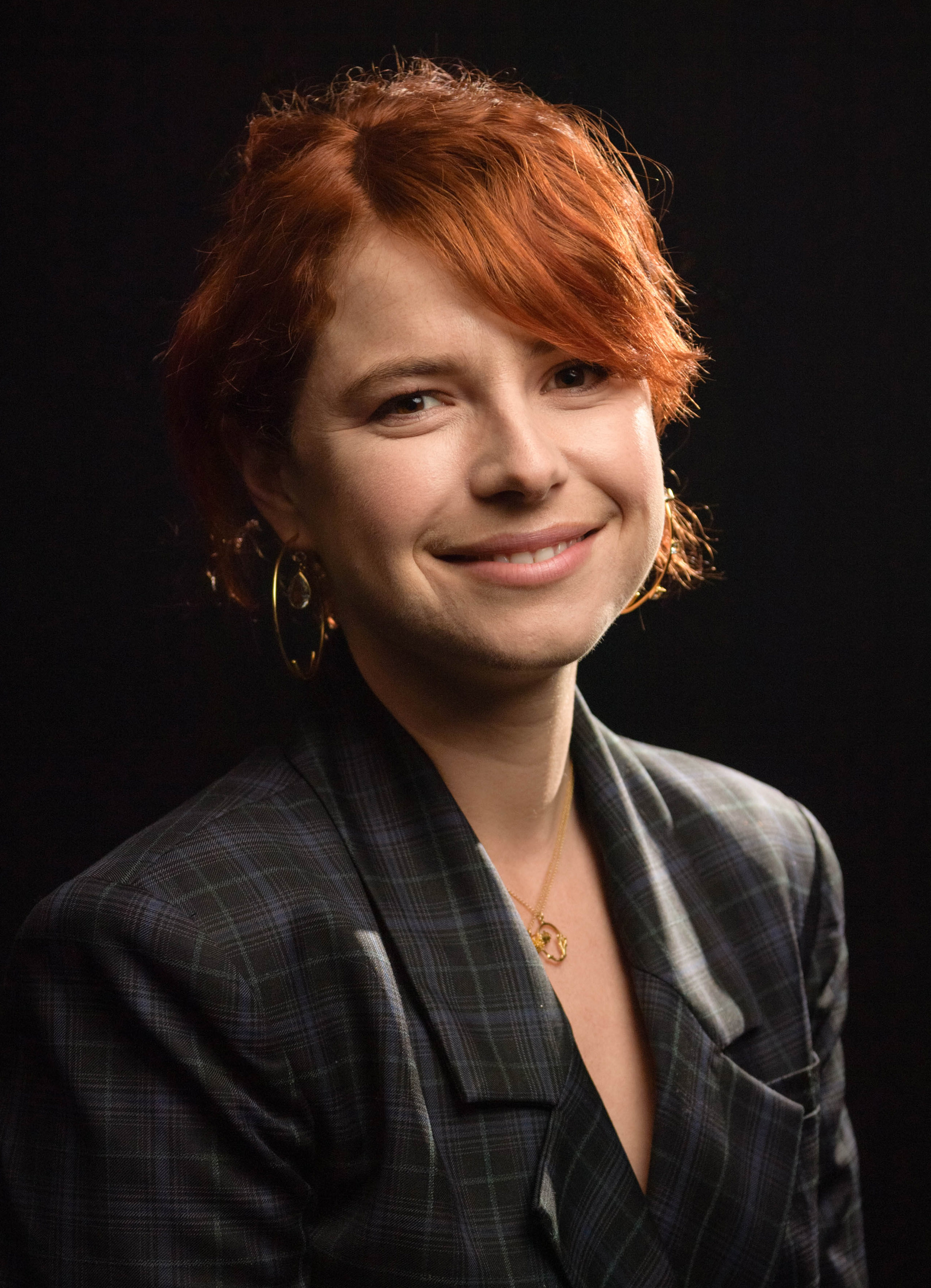
Buckley in January 2019

After an episodic appearance in the detective drama series Endeavour, Buckley portrayed Marya Bolkonskaya in BBC's new dramatisation of War and Peace (2016). She received acclaim for her performance, with Viv Groskop of The Guardian citing her performance as a highlight of episode two, writing that she plays this supposedly plain and pious character "beautifully". Buckley continued her television career with a main role in the drama series Taboo (2017), starring Tom Hardy. She also starred as Honor Martin in BBC One's drama The Last Post (2017), and as Marian Halcombe in the five-part television adaptation of Wilkie Collins' novel The Woman in White (2018).

Buckley made her film debut as Moll Huntford in the psychological thriller Beast (2017). She then starred in the country music drama Wild Rose (2018), which earned Buckley the opportunity to perform music from the film at the Glastonbury Festival. The official soundtrack from the film reached number one on the UK Country Albums Chart. The film received positive reviews and she received a nomination for Best Actress in a Leading Role at the 73rd British Academy Film Awards for her performance.

In 2019, Buckley appeared as Lyudmila Ignatenko in the HBO and Sky UK historical drama mini-series Chernobyl, which revolved around the Chernobyl disaster of 1986 and the clean-up efforts that followed. The five-part series was critically acclaimed, receiving 19 nominations at the 71st Primetime Emmy Awards. Buckley then appeared in the biographical drama Judy, based on the life of American actress Judy Garland.

=== 2020–present: Rise to prominence ===
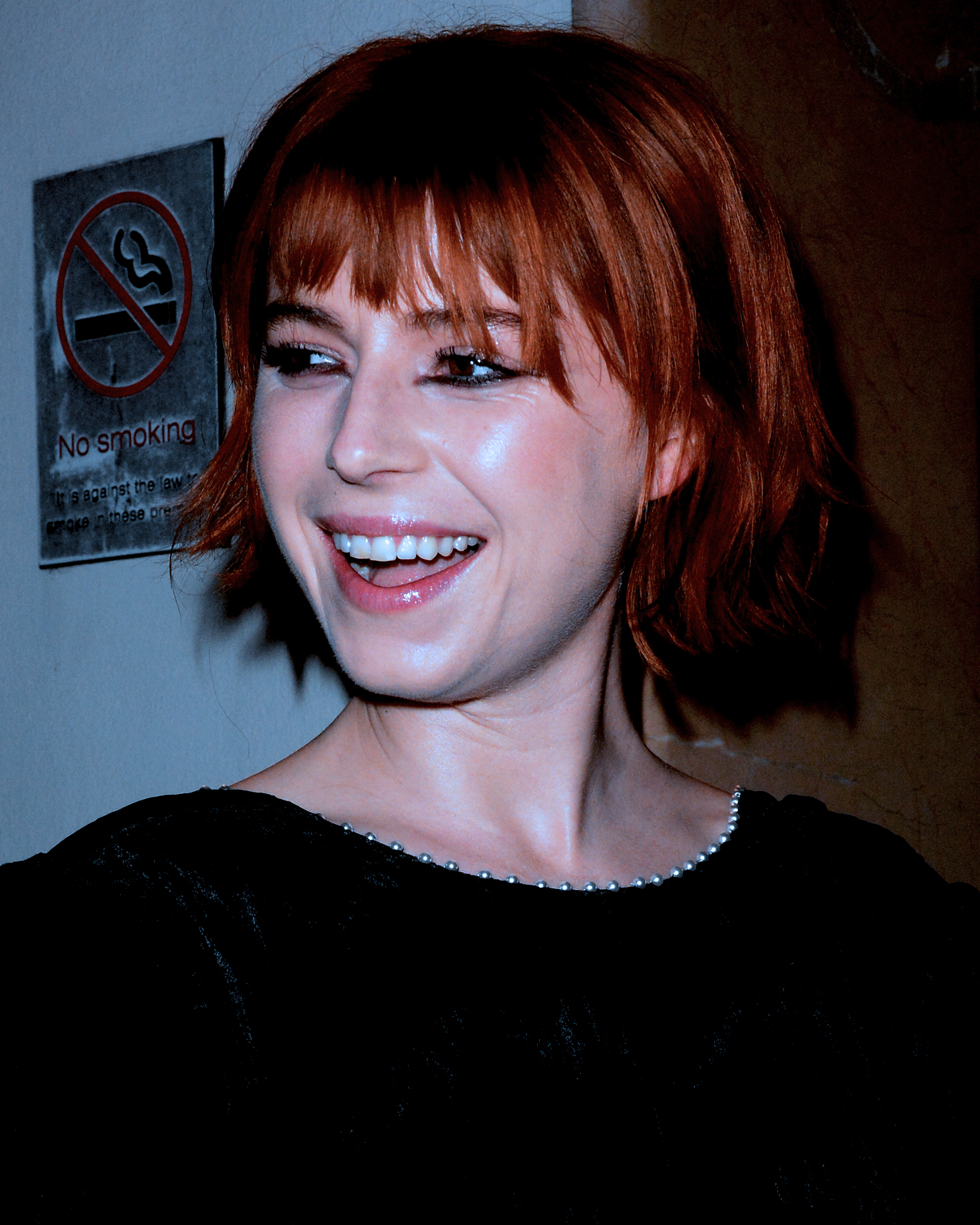
Buckley in January 2020

In 2020, she had four releases: Dolittle, directed by Stephen Gaghan, The Courier, directed by Dominic Cooke, Misbehaviour, directed by Philippa Lowthorpe, and the surrealist psychological thriller I'm Thinking of Ending Things, directed by Charlie Kaufman for Netflix. Her performance in the latter was lauded by critics and earned her a nomination for Best Actress at the 30th Annual Gotham Independent Film Awards. The same year, Buckley had a lead role in the fourth season of the FX black comedy crime drama Fargo, where she played nurse Oraetta Mayflower.

In 2021, Buckley starred as the younger version of Leda Caruso in Maggie Gyllenhaal's feature directorial debut The Lost Daughter, with Olivia Colman portraying the character's older counterpart. The film began a theatrical limited release in the United States on 17 December 2021, prior to streaming on Netflix at the end of the month. It received acclaim from critics. Critic Ty Burr believed that Buckley was a "revelation" in the film. For her performance, Buckley won a Gotham Independent Film Award for Outstanding Supporting Performance, and was nominated for a BAFTA Award for Best Actress in a Supporting Role. She also received her first Academy Award nomination for Best Supporting Actress at the 94th Academy Awards.

Buckley was approached by Eddie Redmayne to star alongside him, as Sally Bowles, in a revival of the musical Cabaret. She embraced the gruelling nature of the role and maintained strict silence during the day to protect her voice for eight shows a week. The production opened to rave reviews in the West End in November 2021, winning Best Musical Revival and Buckley's own as Best Actress at the 2022 Olivier Awards. David Benedict, writing for Variety wrote that Buckley played Bowles "with astonishing fierceness". Nick Curtis, theatre critic for the Evening Standard, described Buckley as "a powerhouse of emotion".

On 15 April 2022, Buckley and former Suede guitarist Bernard Butler released "The Eagle & The Dove", the lead single from their collaborative album. For All Our Days That Tear the Heart was released on 17 June 2022. It debuted at No. 23 on the UK Albums Chart. The album was shortlisted for the 2022 Mercury Prize.

In 2022, Buckley starred as a widowed woman who travels on holiday to a countryside village in Alex Garland's folk horror film Men, alongside Rory Kinnear. The film was screened at the Cannes Film Festival in the Directors' Fortnight section in May 2022, before being released in the United States on 20 May 2022 by A24. In June 2021, Buckley joined Frances McDormand, Rooney Mara, Claire Foy and Ben Whishaw in Sarah Polley's feature adaptation of Miriam Toews' bestselling novel Women Talking, with MGM's Orion Pictures and Plan B Entertainment producing the film. The film began its limited theatrical release in the United States and Canada on 23 December 2022. In July 2022, Buckley joined Colman, Luke Evans, Jonathan Pryce and Johnny Flynn in Scrooge: A Christmas Carol, an animated rendition of the Charles Dickens' classic, which was released on Netflix in December 2022.

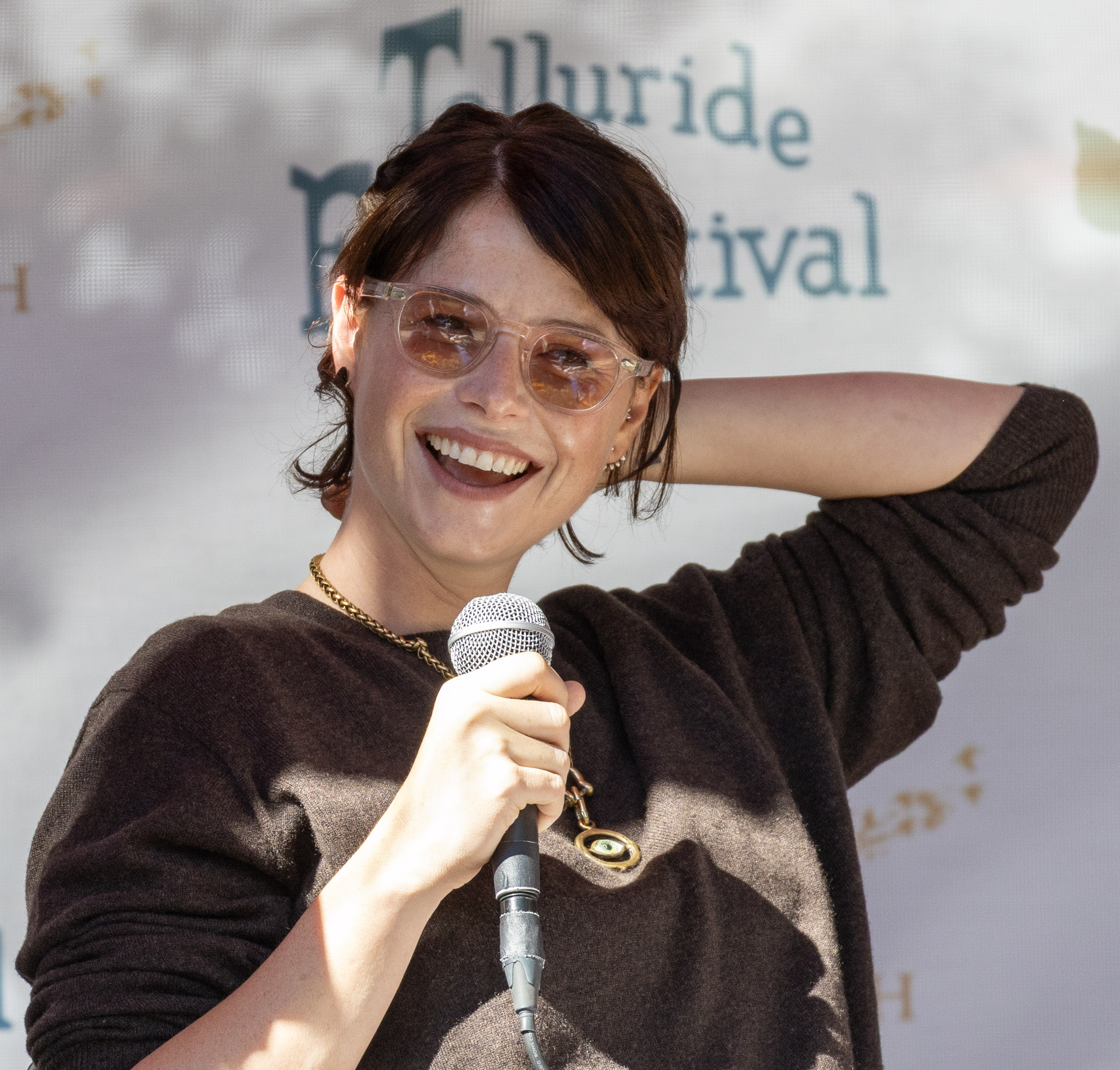
Buckley at the 2025 Telluride Film Festival

She reunited with Olivia Colman in Wicked Little Letters, a comedy directed by Thea Sharrock. Principal photography for the project occurred in autumn 2022 in the United Kingdom. That same year, it was announced that Buckley would replace Carey Mulligan as the lead in Christos Nikou's English-language feature film debut Fingernails. The film, co-starring Riz Ahmed and Jeremy Allen White, was shot in Toronto in late 2022. Both films premiered at the 2023 Toronto International Film Festival.

In May 2023, it was announced that Buckley would star alongside Paul Mescal in Chloé Zhao's historical drama Hamnet, based on the novel of the same name. Listed among the top ten films of 2025 by the American Film Institute, Hamnet received highly positive reviews from critics, with Buckley's performance garnering widespread acclaim. David Fear of Rolling Stone opined that people "will be talking about Jessie Buckley's performance for years" while Johnny Oleksinski at New York Post wrote that "it's Buckley who's giving one of those rare turns that simply beggars belief. She swings back and forth from cast iron to porcelain. The actress is thunderous, playful, grounded and ethereal." Buckley won the award for Best Actress in a Drama at the Golden Globes for the role. Buckley additionally won the Critics' Choice Movie Award for Best Actress, the Actor Award for Outstanding Performance by a Female Actor in a Leading Role, and the BAFTA Award for Best Actress in a Leading Role, becoming the first Irish actress to win for Leading Actress at all four ceremonies. Buckley also received the Academy Award for Best Actress, the first Irish winner of that award.

She next appeared opposite Tim Crouch in a performance of An Oak Tree at the Young Vic in London on 6 May 2025. In February 2026, it was announced that Buckley would star in the upcoming adaptation of Audrey Niffenegger's novel "Three Incestuous Sisters". She will play one of the three title sisters alongside Dakota Johnson and Saoirse Ronan, with Josh O'Connor also attached. Italian director Alice Rohrwacher will helm the project from a screenplay she co-wrote with Ottessa Moshfegh; filming is scheduled to begin in April 2026.

In March 2026, it was announced that Buckley will feature on the tribute album 20th Century Paddy – The Songs of Shane MacGowan, paying homage to The Pogues frontman Shane MacGowan. She contributes a duet with Hozier. The album is scheduled for release on 13 November 2026 via Rubyworks.

In May 2026, Buckley was announced to star opposite her Hamnet co-star Paul Mescal in Benh Zeitlin's upcoming drama Hold On to Your Angels.

== Public image ==
Buckley is an ambassador for The Matt Talbot Community Trust, which provides support for individuals in recovery from addiction.

External videos
- Jessie Buckley sings "Boulder to Birmingham"

She is a frequent television guest, sometimes showcasing her singing. In 2019 she appeared on The Late Late Show and sang the Emmylou Harris song "Boulder to Birmingham", a song featured on the soundtrack of Wild Rose.

In the wake of her historic Academy Award win, which was the first for an Irish woman in the Best Actress category, President of Ireland Catherine Connolly described it as "an historic moment" and extended her "warmest congratulations" to Buckley, praising her contributions to film and theatre.

== Personal life ==
Buckley lived in Norfolk, England, as of 2022. She married Freddie Sorensen, a mental health worker and former TV producer, in mid-2023. In 2025, she gave birth to their daughter.

In a March 2026 appearance on BBC Radio 4's Desert Island Discs, Buckley revealed that she struggled with an eating disorder and depression as a teenager, crediting her passion for acting and music with helping her overcome these challenges.

== Acting credits ==
=== Film ===
Year	Title	Role	Notes
2013	Jack and the Cuckoo-Clock Heart	Luna	Voice; English dub
2017	Beast	Moll Huntford	
2018	Wild Rose	Rose-Lynn Harlan	
2019	Judy	Rosalyn Wilder	
2020	Dolittle	Queen Victoria	
2020	The Courier	Sheila Wynne	
2020	Misbehaviour	Jo Robinson	
2020	I'm Thinking of Ending Things	Young Woman	
2021	The Lost Daughter	Young Leda Caruso	
2022	Men	Harper Marlowe	
2022	Women Talking	Mariche Loewen	
2022	Scrooge: A Christmas Carol	Isabel Fezziwig	Voice
2023	Fingernails	Anna	
2023	Wicked Little Letters	Rose Gooding	
2025	Hamnet	Agnes Shakespeare	Academy Award for Best Actress
2026	The Bride!	Ida / Penelope Rogers / The Bride / Mary Shelley's Ghost	
TBA	The Three Incestuous Sisters †		Post Production
TBA	Hold On to Your Angels		Filming

=== Television ===
Year	Title	Role	Notes
2008	I'd Do Anything	Herself (contestant)	Runner-up
2010–2011	Shades of Love	Emily Strong	3 episodes
2014	Endeavour	Kitty Batten	Episode: "Trove"
2016	War & Peace	Marya Bolkonskaya	6 episodes
2017	Taboo	Lorna Bow	7 episodes
2017	The Last Post	Honor Martin	6 episodes
2018	The Woman in White	Marian Halcombe	5 episodes
2019	Chernobyl	Lyudmila Ignatenko	5 episodes
2020	Fargo	Oraetta Mayflower	Season 4 (10 episodes)
2021	Romeo & Juliet	Juliet	Royal National Theatre play for Sky Arts
2025	The Scarecrows' Wedding	Betty O'Barley (voice)	Television film

=== Video games ===
Year	Title	Role	Notes
2022	The Dark Pictures Anthology: The Devil in Me	Kate Wilder	Voice, motion capture, and likeness

=== Theatre ===
Year	Title	Role	Venue
2008–2009	A Little Night Music	Anne Egerman	Menier Chocolate Factory; Garrick Theatre
2013	The Tempest	Miranda	Shakespeare's Globe
2013	Gabriel	Kate	Shakespeare's Globe
2013	Henry V	Katherine	Noël Coward Theatre
2014	Amadeus	Constanze Mozart	Chichester Festival Theatre
2015	The Winter's Tale	Perdita	Garrick Theatre
2021–2022	Cabaret	Sally Bowles	Playhouse Theatre
2028	Afterbirth	Annie	Royal Court Theatre

== Discography ==
Collaborative albums

- For All Our Days That Tear the Heart (with Bernard Butler) (2022)

Soundtrack albums

- Wild Rose (2019)

== Awards and nominations ==
In 2026, Buckley was awarded the Golden Globe for Best Performance by a Female Actor in a Motion Picture—Drama and the Academy Award for Best Actress for her role as Agnes Shakespeare in Hamnet. She was the first Irish actress to win this Academy Award.

== See also ==
- List of Academy Award winners and nominees from Ireland
- List of actors with Academy Award nominations
- List of Golden Globe winners
- List of Irish actors
