= List of accolades received by Netflix =

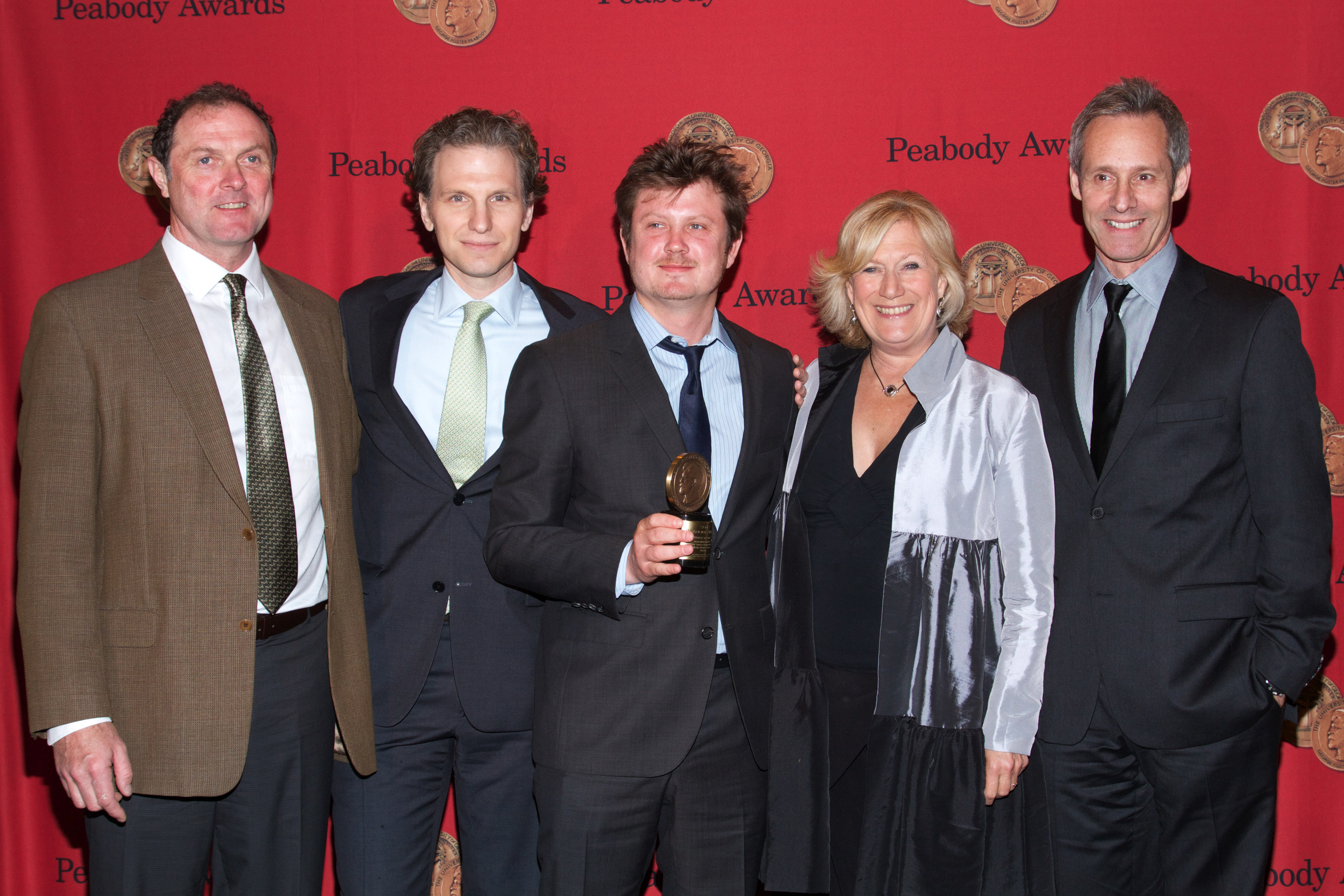
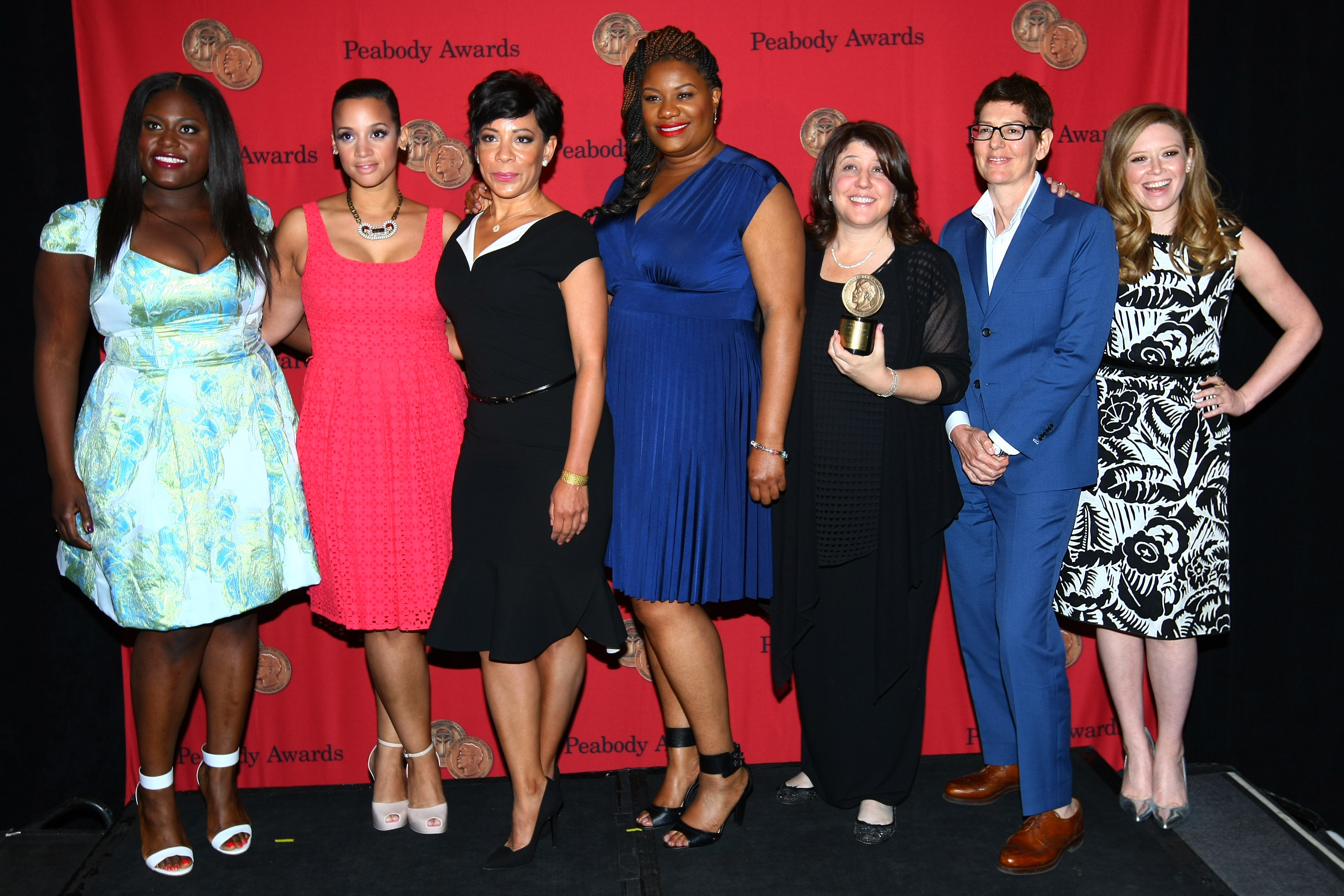
- Cast and crew from House of Cards (left) and Orange Is the New Black (right) with the Peabody Award
Awards and nominations
Award	Wins	Nominations
Academy Awards	26	168
BAFTA Film Awards	1	2
BAFTA Television Awards	3	21
Critics' Choice Television Awards	7	28
Daytime Emmy Awards	60	91
Golden Globe Awards	35	207
Grammy Awards	4	14
Peabody Awards	8	8
Primetime Emmy Awards	154	762
Screen Actors Guild Awards	11	34
TCA Awards	2	22

Totals (Note: Certain award groups do not simply award one winner. They acknowledge several different recipients, have runners-up, and have third place. Since this is a specific recognition and is different from losing an award, runner-up mentions are considered wins in this award tally. For simplification and to avoid errors, each award in this list has been presumed to have had a prior nomination.)
- Wins: 281
- Nominations: 514

Netflix is an American on-demand internet streaming media provider. The company was founded by Reed Hastings and Marc Randolph on August 29, 1997, in Scotts Valley, California. It specializes in and provides streaming media and video-on-demand online and DVD by mail. In 2013, Netflix expanded into original film and television production, as well as online distribution.

Due to entering into production and not only releasing original content and its reception, films and TV programs produced and distributed by Netflix were eligible for major awards. On July 18, 2013, Netflix became the first streaming platform to produce a TV program specifically for streaming and to earn major nominations and eventually win a Primetime Emmy Award. Also House of Cards became the first online-only web television program to be nominated and its pilot episode, "Chapter 1", was the first webisode of a television series to win an Emmy.

On January 12, 2014, Robin Wright (House of Cards) was the first actress to be nominated for a web television program produced by a streaming platform and to win an award at the Golden Globe Awards. Netflix was also the first high-profile streaming service whose film production company produced a film that earned an Academy Award nomination. In addition, Netflix has earned accolades with different peer groups and associations, including: Television Critics Association Awards, BAFTA Awards, Critics' Choice Television Awards, Screen Actors Guild Awards and others.

== History and achievements ==
In 2013, originals like House of Cards and Orange Is the New Black received critical acclaim from critics and viewers. As a result, programs produced or streamed by Netflix earned fourteen Primetime Emmy nominations for original online-only web television programs. House of Cards' pilot episode "Chapter 1" was awarded the Primetime Emmy Award for Outstanding Directing for a Drama Series, becoming the first webisode of a television series to win an Emmy. Other nominations included Outstanding Drama Series, Outstanding Lead Actor in a Drama Series (Kevin Spacey) and Outstanding Lead Actress in a Drama Series (Robin Wright). On December 11, 2013, Kevin Spacey (House of Cards) and Jason Bateman (Arrested Development) were the leading actors nominated at the Screen Actors Guild Awards. Spacey for Outstanding Performance by a Female Actor in a Drama Series and Bateman for Outstanding Performance by a Male Actor in a Comedy Series The day after, House of cards and Orange is the new black both earned six Golden Globe Award nominations, including Best Television Series – Drama. On January 12, 2014, Robin Wright (House of Cards) won the Golden Globe Award for Best Actress – Television Series Drama for her portrayal of Claire Underwood. With the accolade, Wright became the first actress to win a Golden Globe for an online-only web television series. It was also the first award in an acting category for a Netflix's production. Programs streamed and produced by the company also received nominations for the Writers Guild of America Awards, Directors Guild of America Awards and Grammy Awards.

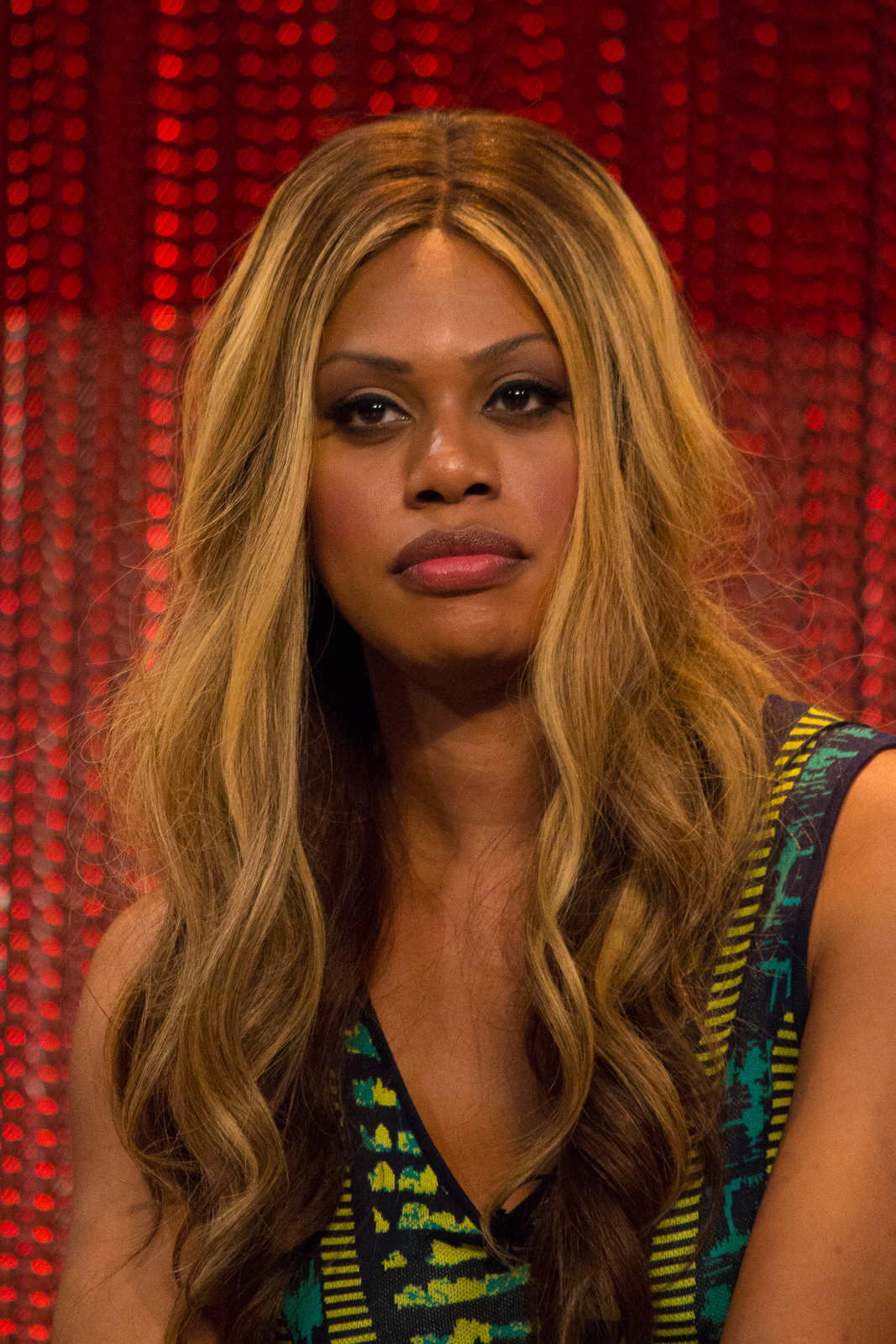
Laverne Cox (Orange Is the New Black) was the first ever transgender person to be nominated for a Primetime Emmy Award.

On January 12, 2014, The Square was nominated for an Academy Award. Netflix became the first high-profile streaming service to stream a new film that went on to be nominated for an Academy Award. On February, Orange Is the New Black dominated the Satellite Awards winning Best Television Series – Musical or Comedy, Best Actress – Television Series Musical or Comedy (Taylor Schilling), Best Supporting Actress – Series, Miniseries or Television Film (Laura Prepon) and Best Cast – Television Series. On the drama side, Robin Wright won Best Actress – Television Series Drama. Later that year, House of Cards earned a British Academy Television Award nomination for Best International Programme and a Critics' Choice Television Award nomination for Best Actress in a Drama Series (Robin Wright). On July 10, 2014, nominations for the 66th Primetime Emmy Awards were announced, with programs produced or streamed by Netflix scoring a total of thirty-one. Orange Is the New Black earned a total of twelve nominations, including Outstanding Comedy Series, Outstanding Lead Actress in a Comedy Series (Taylor Schilling), Outstanding Supporting Actress in a Comedy Series (Kate Mulgrew), Outstanding Directing for a Comedy Series (Jodie Foster) and Outstanding Writing for a Comedy Series (Liz Friedman and Jenji Kohan). Nominated for Outstanding Guest Actress in a Comedy Series were Uzo Aduba, Laverne Cox and Natasha Lyonne. Uzo Aduba won the Emmy, becoming the first actress from a Netflix original to win the award. In addition, Laverne Cox made history by becoming the first transgender person ever nominated for a Primetime Emmy Award. Meanwhile, Orange Is the New Black debuted strong, House of Cards increased the number of nominations from nine to thirteen. The political drama held Outstanding Drama Series and both leads in acting. It debuted entries in categories like Outstanding Writing for a Drama Series (Beau Willimon), Outstanding Guest Actor in a Drama Series (Reg E. Cathey) and Outstanding Guest Actress in a Drama Series (Kate Mara).

At the 72nd Golden Globe Awards, Kevin Spacey won in the category Best Actor – Television Series Drama and became the first actor to win the award for a program produced by Netflix. On January 15, 2015, Virunga got an Academy Award nomination in the Documentary Feature category, being the second time Netflix streamed a film nominated for an Academy Award. Days later, Kevin Spacey and Uzo Aduba won at the 21st Screen Actors Guild Awards, for Outstanding Performance by a Male Actor in a Drama Series and Outstanding Performance by a Female Actor in a Comedy Series, respectively. Also Orange Is the New Black won the Screen Actors Guild Award for Outstanding Performance by an Ensemble in a Comedy Series. At the Producers Guild Awards, Orange Is the New Black won for Best Episodic Comedy and House of Cards was nominated for the second time. For the 2015 Primetime Emmy Awards, the company received thirty-four nominations, with House of Cards and Unbreakable Kimmy Schmidt leading. Despite the critical acclaim of Season 2, Orange Is the New Black decreased in nominations, from twelve to four, as a result of switching from comedy to drama categories. Tina Fey's Unbreakable Kimmy Schmidt debuted with seven entries, Bloodline with two and Grace and Frankie with one. Uzo Aduba won her second consecutive Emmy, this time in the Outstanding Supporting Actress in a Drama Series category for the episode: "Hugs Can Be Deceiving".

On January 10, 2016, Narcos was nominated for two Golden Globe Awards, including Best Television Series – Drama and Best Actor – Television Series Drama for Wagner Moura. Days later, Master of None made its debut winning the Critics' Choice Television Award for Best Comedy Series. Uzo Aduba and the cast of Orange Is the New Black won a Screen Actors Guild for Outstanding Performance by a Female Actor in a Comedy Series and Outstanding Performance by an Ensemble in a Comedy Series, for a second consecutive time. Kevin Spacey repeated as the winner of the SAG Award for Outstanding Performance by a Male Actor in a Drama Series. For the 88th Academy Awards, Winter on Fire: Ukraine's Fight for Freedom and What Happened, Miss Simone? were nominated. What Happened, Miss Simone? was nominated for a Grammy Award for Best Music Film. For the third season of Orange Is the New Black, Taylor Schilling won for the second time the Satellite Award for Best Actress – Television Series Musical or Comedy. For the 2016 Primetime Emmys, programs streamed by Netflix reached the third place in number of nominations with fifty-four. Nominations led by House of Cards, Making a Murderer, What Happened, Miss Simone? and Master of None. Making a Murderer won Outstanding Documentary or Nonfiction Series, Outstanding Directing for Nonfiction Programming and Outstanding Writing for Nonfiction Programming. Aziz Ansari and Alan Yang, from Master of None won the Emmy for writing the episode "Parents".

At the 7th Critics' Choice Television Awards, John Lithgow (The Crown Season 1) won Best Supporting Actor in a Drama Series and Jane Krakowski (Unbreakable Kimmy Schmidt Season 2) won Best Supporting Actress in a Comedy Series. On January 8, 2017, at the 74th Golden Globe Awards, The Crown won two awards: Best Television Series – Drama and Best Actress – Television Series Drama for Claire Foy. Later that month, at the 28th Producers Guild of America Awards, Stranger Things Season 1 won for Best Episodic Drama while Making a Murderer won for Best Non-Fiction Television. Moreover, Netflix saw further success at the 23rd Screen Actors Guild Awards with four major wins, with The Crown Season 1 winning Outstanding Performance by a Male Actor in a Drama Series (John Lithgow) and Outstanding Performance by a Female Actor in a Drama Series (Claire Foy), while Stranger Things Season 1 won Outstanding Performance by an Ensemble in a Drama Series and Orange Is the New Black Season 4 won Outstanding Performance by an Ensemble in a Comedy Series. Later that year, at the 69th Primetime Emmy Awards, programs produced or streamed by Netflix scored a total of twenty-seven nominations and four wins, Black Mirror: San Junipero winning Outstanding Television Movie and Outstanding Writing for a Limited or Anthology Series or Movie for Charlie Brooker. John Lithgow (The Crown Season 1) won Outstanding Supporting Actor in a Drama Series, while Master of None secured its second consecutive win for Outstanding Writing for a Comedy Series, with Aziz Ansari and Lena Waithe, for writing the episode "Thanksgiving".

== Major awards ==
=== Academy Awards for films streamed, distributed or produced by Netflix ===
The Academy Awards, also known as the Oscars, is a set of twenty-three awards for artistic and technical merit in the American film industry, given annually by the Academy of Motion Picture Arts and Sciences (AMPAS), to recognize excellence in cinematic achievements as assessed by the Academy's voting membership. In twelve ceremonies, films streamed and distributed, but also produced by Netflix won 33 awards in fourteen categories from 168 nominations in twenty-four categories.

Category	Winners and nominees
Best Picture	2019: Roma – Gabriela Rodríguez and Alfonso Cuarón; 2020: The Irishman – Martin Scorsese, Robert De Niro, Jane Rosenthal, and Emma Tillinger Koskoff; 2020: Marriage Story – Noah Baumbach and David Heyman; 2021: Mank – Ceán Chaffin, Eric Roth, and Douglas Urbanski; 2021: The Trial of the Chicago 7 – Marc Platt and Stuart Besser; 2022: Don't Look Up – Adam McKay and Kevin Messick; 2022: The Power of the Dog – Jane Campion, Tanya Seghatchian, Emile Sherman, Iain Canning, and Roger Frappier; 2023: All Quiet on the Western Front – Malte Grunert; 2024: Maestro – Bradley Cooper, Steven Spielberg, Fred Berner, Amy Durning and Kristie Macosko Krieger; 2025: Emilia Pérez – Pascal Caucheteux and Jacques Audiard; 2026: Frankenstein – Guillermo del Toro, J. Miles Dale and Scott Stuber; 2026: Train Dreams – Marissa McMahon, Teddy Schwarzman, Will Janowitz, Ashley Schlaifer and Michael Heimler
Best Director	2019: Alfonso Cuarón (Winner) – Roma; 2020: Martin Scorsese – The Irishman; 2021: David Fincher – Mank; 2022: Jane Campion (Winner) – The Power of the Dog; 2025: Jacques Audiard – Emilia Pérez
Best Actor	2020: Adam Driver – Marriage Story; 2020: Jonathan Pryce – The Two Popes; 2021: Chadwick Boseman – Ma Rainey's Black Bottom; 2021: Gary Oldman – Mank; 2022: Benedict Cumberbatch – The Power of the Dog; 2022: Andrew Garfield – tick, tick... BOOM!; 2024: Bradley Cooper – Maestro; 2024: Colman Domingo – Rustin
Best Actress	2019: Yalitza Aparicio – Roma; 2020: Scarlett Johansson – Marriage Story; 2021: Viola Davis – Ma Rainey's Black Bottom; 2021: Vanessa Kirby – Pieces of a Woman; 2022: Olivia Colman – The Lost Daughter; 2023: Ana de Armas – Blonde; 2024: Annette Bening – Nyad; 2024: Carey Mulligan – Maestro; 2025: Karla Sofía Gascón – Emilia Pérez
Best Supporting Actor	2020: Anthony Hopkins – The Two Popes; 2020: Al Pacino – The Irishman; 2020: Joe Pesci – The Irishman; 2021: Sacha Baron Cohen – The Trial of the Chicago 7; 2022: Jesse Plemons – The Power of the Dog; 2022: Kodi Smit-McPhee – The Power of the Dog; 2026: Jacob Elordi – Frankenstein
Best Supporting Actress	2018: Mary J. Blige – Mudbound; 2019: Marina de Tavira – Roma; 2020: Laura Dern (Winner) – Marriage Story; 2021: Glenn Close – Hillbilly Elegy; 2021: Amanda Seyfried – Mank; 2022: Jessie Buckley – The Lost Daughter; 2022: Kirsten Dunst – The Power of the Dog; 2024: Jodie Foster – Nyad; 2025: Zoe Saldaña (Winner) – Emilia Pérez
Best Original Screenplay	2019: Roma – Alfonso Cuarón; 2020: Marriage Story – Noah Baumbach; 2021: The Trial of the Chicago 7 – Aaron Sorkin; 2022: Don't Look Up – Adam McKay and David Sirota; 2024: Maestro – Bradley Cooper and Josh Singer; 2024: May December – Samy Burch and Alex Mechanik
Best Adapted Screenplay	2018: Mudbound – Virgil Williams and Dee Rees; 2019: The Ballad of Buster Scruggs – Joel Coen and Ethan Coen; 2020: The Irishman – Steven Zaillian; 2020: The Two Popes – Anthony McCarten; 2021: The White Tiger – Ramin Bahrani; 2022: The Lost Daughter – Maggie Gyllenhaal; 2022: The Power of the Dog – Jane Campion; 2023: All Quiet on the Western Front – Edward Berger, Lesley Paterson, and Ian Stokell; 2023: Glass Onion: A Knives Out Mystery – Rian Johnson; 2025: Emilia Pérez – Jacques Audiard, Thomas Bidegain, Léa Mysius, and Nicolas Livecchi; 2026: Frankenstein – Guillermo del Toro; 2026: Train Dreams – Clint Bentley and Greg Kwedar
Best Foreign Language Film	2018: On Body and Soul – Ildikó Enyedi (Hungary); 2019: Roma (Winner) – Alfonso Cuarón (Mexico); 2022: The Hand of God – Paolo Sorrentino (Italy); 2023: All Quiet on the Western Front (Winner) – Edward Berger (Germany); 2024: Society of the Snow – J.A. Bayona (Spain); 2025: Emilia Pérez – Jacques Audiard (France)
Best Animated Feature Film	2020: I Lost My Body – Jeremy Clapin and Marc du Pontavice; 2020: Klaus – Sergio Pablos, Jinko Gotoh, and Marisa Román; 2021: Over the Moon – Glen Keane, Gennie Rin, and Peilin Chou; 2022: The Mitchells vs. the Machines – Mike Rianda, Phil Lord, Christopher Miller, and Kurt Albrecht; 2023: Guillermo del Toro's Pinocchio (Winner) – Guillermo del Toro, Mark Gustafson, Gary Ungar, and Alex Bulkley; 2023: The Sea Beast – Chris Williams and Jed Schlanger; 2024: Nimona – Nick Bruno, Troy Quane, Karen Ryan and Julie Zackary; 2025: Wallace & Gromit: Vengeance Most Fowl – Nick Park, Merlin Crossingham, and Richard Beek; 2026: KPop Demon Hunters (Winner) – Maggie Kang, Chris Appelhans and Michelle L.M. Wong
Best Animated Short Film	2021: If Anything Happens I Love You (Winner) – Will McCormack and Michael Govier; 2022: Robin Robin – Dan Ojari and Mikey Please
Best Documentary Feature	2014: The Square – Jehane Noujaim and Karim Amer; 2015: Virunga – Orlando von Einsiedel and Joanna Natasegara; 2016: What Happened, Miss Simone? – Liz Garbus, Amy Hobby, and Justin Wilkes; 2016: Winter on Fire: Ukraine's Fight for Freedom – Evgeny Afineevsky and Den Tolmor; 2017: 13th – Ava DuVernay, Spencer Averick, and Howard Barish; 2018: Icarus (Winner) – Bryan Fogel and Dan Cogan; 2018: Strong Island – Yance Ford and Joslyn Barnes; 2020: American Factory (Winner) – Steven Bognar, Julia Reichert, and Jeff Reichert; 2020: The Edge of Democracy – Petra Costa, Joanna Natasegara, Shane Boris, and Tiago Pavan; 2021: Crip Camp – Nicole Newnham, Jim LeBrecht, and Sara Bolder; 2021: My Octopus Teacher (Winner) – Pippa Ehrlich, James Reed, and Craig Foster; 2026: The Perfect Neighbor – Geeta Gandbhir, Alisa Payne, Nikon Kwantu and Sam Bisbee
Best Documentary Short Subject	2017: Extremis – Dan Krauss; 2017: The White Helmets (Winner) – Orlando von Einsiedel and Joanna Natasegara; 2018: Heroin(e) – Elaine McMillion Sheldon and Kerrin Sheldon; 2019: End Game – Rob Epstein and Jeffrey Friedman; 2019: Period. End of Sentence. (Winner) – Rayka Zehtabchi and Melissa Berton; 2020: Life Overtakes Me – John Haptas and Kristine Samuelson; 2021: A Love Song for Latasha – Sophia Nahali Allison and Janice Duncan; 2022: Audible – Matthew Ogens and Geoff McLean; 2022: Lead Me Home – Pedro Kos and Jon Shenk; 2022: Three Songs for Benazir– Elizabeth Mirzaei and Gulistan Mirzaei; 2023: The Elephant Whisperers (Winner) – Kartiki Gonsalves and Guneet Monga; 2023: The Martha Mitchell Effect – Anne Alvergue and Beth Levison; 2025: The Only Girl in the Orchestra (Winner) – Molly O'Brien and Lisa Remington; 2026: All the Empty Rooms (Winner) – Joshua Seftel and Conall Jones
Best Original Score	2020: Marriage Story – Randy Newman; 2021: Da 5 Bloods – Terence Blanchard; 2021: Mank – Trent Reznor and Atticus Ross; 2022: Don't Look Up – Nicholas Britell; 2022: The Power of the Dog – Jonny Greenwood; 2023: All Quiet on the Western Front (Winner) – Volker Bertelmann; 2025: Emilia Pérez – Clément Ducol and Camille; 2026: Frankenstein – Alexandre Desplat
Best Original Song	2018: "Mighty River" from Mudbound – Mary J. Blige, Raphael Saadiq, and Taura Stinson; 2019: "When a Cowboy Trades His Spurs for Wings" from The Ballad of Buster Scruggs – David Rawlings and Gillian Welch; 2021: "Hear My Voice" from The Trial of the Chicago 7 – Daniel Pemberton and Celeste Waite; 2021: "Husavik" from Eurovision Song Contest: The Story of Fire Saga – Savan Kotecha, Fat Max Gsus, and Rickard Göransson; 2021: "Io sì (Seen)" from The Life Ahead – Diane Warren and Laura Pausini; 2024: "It Never Went Away" from American Symphony - Jon Batiste and Dan Wilson; 2025: "El Mal" from Emilia Pérez (Winner) – Clément Ducol, Camille and Jacques Audiard; 2025: "The Journey" from The Six Triple Eight – Diane Warren; 2025: "Mi Camino" from Emilia Pérez – Clément Ducol and Camille; 2026: "Golden" from KPop Demon Hunters (Winner) – EJAE, Mark Sonnenblick, Joong Gyu Kwak, Yu Han Lee, Hee Dong Nam, Jeong Hoon Seon and Teddy Park; 2026: "Train Dreams" from Train Dreams – Nick Cave and Bryce Dessner
Best Sound / Best Sound Editing	2019: Roma – Sergio Díaz and Skip Lievsay (Best Sound Editing); 2019: Roma – Skip Lievsay, Craig Henighan, and José Antonio García; 2021: Mank – Ren Klyce, Jeremy Molod, David Parker, Nathan Nance, and Drew Kunin; 2022: The Power of the Dog – Richard Flynn, Robert Mackenzie, and Tara Webb; 2023: All Quiet on the Western Front – Viktor Prášil, Frank Kruse, Markus Stemler, Lars Ginzel, and Stefan Korte; 2024: Maestro - Steven A. Morrow, Richard King, Jason Ruder, Tom Ozanich and Dean Zupancic; 2025: Emilia Pérez – Erwan Kerzanet, Aymeric Devoldère, Maxence Dussère, Cyril Holtz and Niels Barletta; 2026: Frankenstein – Greg Chapman, Nathan Robitaille, Nelson Ferreira, Christian Cooke and Brad Zoern
Best Production Design	2019: Roma – Eugenio Caballero and Bárbara Enríquez; 2020: The Irishman – Bob Shaw and Regina Graves; 2021: Ma Rainey's Black Bottom – Mark Ricker, Karen O'Hara, and Diana Stoughton; 2021: Mank (Winner) – Donald Graham Burt and Jan Pascale; 2022: The Power of the Dog – Grant Major and Amber Richards; 2023: All Quiet on the Western Front (Winner) – Christian M. Goldbeck and Ernestine Hipper; 2026: Frankenstein (Winner) – Tamara Deverell and Shane Vieau
Best Cinematography	2018: Mudbound – Rachel Morrison; 2019: Roma (Winner) – Alfonso Cuarón; 2020: The Irishman – Rodrigo Prieto; 2021: Mank (Winner) – Erik Messerschmidt; 2021: The Trial of the Chicago 7 – Phedon Papamichael; 2022: The Power of the Dog – Ari Wegner; 2023: All Quiet on the Western Front (Winner) – James Friend; 2023: Bardo, False Chronicle of a Handful of Truths – Darius Khondji; 2024: El Conde - Edward Lachman; 2024: Maestro - Matthew Libatique; 2025: Emilia Pérez - Paul Guilhaume; 2025: Maria - Edward Lachman; 2026: Frankenstein – Dan Laustsen; 2026: Train Dreams – Adolpho Veloso
Best Costume Design	2019: The Ballad of Buster Scruggs – Mary Zophres; 2020: The Irishman – Sandy Powell and Christopher Peterson; 2021: Ma Rainey's Black Bottom (Winner) – Ann Roth; 2021: Mank – Trish Summerville; 2026: Frankenstein (Winner) – Kate Hawley
Best Makeup and Hairstyling	2021: Hillbilly Elegy – Eryn Krueger Mekash, Matthew Mungle, and Patricia Dehaney; 2021: Ma Rainey's Black Bottom (Winner) – Sergio Lopez-Rivera, Mia Neal, and Jamika Wilson; 2021: Mank – Gigi Williams, Kimberley Spiteri, and Colleen LaBaff; 2023: All Quiet on the Western Front – Heike Merker and Linda Eisenhamerová; 2024: Maestro - Kazu Hiro, Kay Georgiou and Lori McCoy-Bell; 2024: Society of the Snow - Ana López-Puigcerver, David Martí and Montse Ribé; 2025: Emilia Pérez – Julia Floch Carbonel, Emmanuel Janvier, and Jean-Christophe Spadaccini; 2026: Frankenstein (Winner) – Mike Hill, Jordan Samuel and Cliona Furey
Best Film Editing	2020: The Irishman – Thelma Schoonmaker; 2021: The Trial of the Chicago 7 – Alan Baumgarten; 2022: Don't Look Up – Hank Corwin; 2022: The Power of the Dog – Peter Sciberras; 2022: tick, tick... BOOM! – Myron Kerstein and Andrew Weisblum; 2025: Emilia Pérez – Juliette Welfling
Best Visual Effects	2020: The Irishman – Pablo Helman, Leandro Estebecorena, Nelson Sepulveda-Fauser, and Stephane Grabli; 2021: The Midnight Sky – Matt Kasmir, Christopher Lawrence, Max Solomon, and David Watkins; 2023: All Quiet on the Western Front – Frank Petzold, Viktor Müller, Markus Frank, and Kamil Jafar
Best Short Live Action	2021: Two Distant Strangers (Winner) – Travon Free and Martin Desmond Roe; 2024: The After – Misan Harriman and Nicky Bentham; 2024: The Wonderful Story of Henry Sugar (Winner) - Wes Anderson and Steven Rales; 2025: Anuja – Adam J. Graves and Suchitra Mattai; 2026: The Singers (Winner) – Sam A. Davis and Jack Piatt

=== Emmy Awards ===
An Emmy Award, or simply Emmy, is an American award that recognizes excellence in the television industry, and corresponds to the Oscar (for film), the Tony Award (for theatre), and the Grammy Award (for music). programs streamed and/or produced by Netflix won 265 from 619 nominations. Below is a list of selected categories won by original programming.

Category	Winners
Documentary or Nonfiction Special	2016: What Happened, Miss Simone?; 2017: 13th
Documentary or Nonfiction Series	2016: Making a Murderer – Laura Ricciardi and Moira Demos; 2018: Wild Wild Country – Chapman Way and Maclain Way; 2019: Our Planet – Alastair Fothergill and Keith Scholey; 2024: Beckham – David Gardner and Gary Neville
Television Movie	2017: Black Mirror: San Junipero; 2018: Black Mirror: USS Callister; 2019: Black Mirror: Bandersnatch; 2021: Dolly Parton's Christmas on the Square; 2025: Rebel Ridge; 2026: Remarkably Bright Creatures
Structured Reality Program	2018, 2019, 2020, 2021, 2022, 2023, 2025: Queer Eye
Unstructured Reality Program	2020: Cheer; 2022, 2025, 2026: Love on the Spectrum
Variety Special (Pre-Recorded)	2018: Dave Chappelle: Equanimity; 2020: Dave Chappelle: Sticks & Stones; 2025: Conan O'Brien: The Kennedy Center Mark Twain Prize for American Humor
Drama Series	2021: The Crown
Lead Actor in a Drama Series	2021: Josh O'Connor – The Crown; 2022: Lee Jung-jae – Squid Game
Lead Actress in a Drama Series	2018: Claire Foy – The Crown; 2021: Olivia Colman – The Crown
Supporting Actor in a Drama Series	2016: Ben Mendelsohn – Bloodline; 2017: John Lithgow – The Crown; 2021: Tobias Menzies – The Crown
Supporting Actress in a Drama Series	2015: Uzo Aduba – Orange Is the New Black; 2019: Julia Garner – Ozark; 2020: Julia Garner – Ozark; 2021: Gillian Anderson – The Crown; 2022: Julia Garner – Ozark; 2024: Elizabeth Debicki – The Crown; 2026: Allison Janney – The Diplomat
Limited or Anthology Series	2021: The Queen's Gambit; 2023: Beef; 2024: Baby Reindeer; 2025: Adolescence
Lead Actor in a Limited Series or Movie	2019: Jharrel Jerome – When They See Us; 2021: Ewan McGregor – Halston; 2023: Steven Yeun – Beef; 2024: Richard Gadd – Baby Reindeer; 2025: Stephen Graham – Adolescence
Lead Actress in a Limited Series or Movie	2018: Regina King – Seven Seconds; 2023: Ali Wong – Beef; 2026: Sally Field – BRemarkably Bright Creatures
Supporting Actor in a Limited Series or Movie	2018: Jeff Daniels – Godless; 2025: Owen Cooper – Adolescence
Supporting Actress in a Limited Series or Movie	2018: Merritt Wever – Godless; 2023: Niecy Nash-Betts – Dahmer – Monster: The Jeffrey Dahmer Story; 2024: Jessica Gunning – Baby Reindeer; 2025: Erin Doherty – Adolescence
Guest Actor in a Drama Series	2015: Reg E. Cathey – House of Cards
Guest Actress in a Drama Series	2021: Claire Foy – The Crown; 2022: Lee Yoo-mi – Squid Game
Guest Actress in a Comedy Series	2014: Uzo Aduba – Orange Is the New Black
Cinematography for a Single-Camera Series (One Hour)	2013: House of Cards – Eigil Bryld; 2018, 2021: The Crown – Adriano Goldman
Directing for a Drama Series	2013: House of Cards – David Fincher; 2018: The Crown – Stephen Daldry; 2019: Ozark – Jason Bateman; 2021: The Crown – Jessica Hobbs; 2022: Hwang Dong-hyuk – Squid Game
Directing for a Variety Special	2019: Springsteen on Broadway – Thom Zimny; 2020: Dave Chappelle: Sticks & Stones – Stan Lathan; 2021: Bo Burnham: Inside – Bo Burnham
Directing for a Limited Series, Movie, or Dramatic Special	2020: Unorthodox – Maria Schrader; 2021: The Queen's Gambit – Scott Frank; 2023: Beef – Lee Sung Jin; 2024: Ripley – Steven Zaillian; 2025: Adolescence – Philip Barantini
Single-Camera Picture Editing for a Drama Series	2017: Stranger Things – Dean Zimmerman; 2021: The Crown – Yan Miles
Writing for a Drama Series	2021: The Crown – Peter Morgan
Writing for a Comedy Series	2016: Master of None – Aziz Ansari and Alan Yang; 2017: Master of None – Aziz Ansari and Lena Waithe
Writing for a Variety Special	2016: Patton Oswalt: Talking for Clapping – Patton Oswalt; 2018: John Mulaney: Kid Gorgeous at Radio City – John Mulaney; 2019: Hannah Gadsby: Nanette – Hannah Gadsby; 2020: Dave Chappelle: Sticks & Stones – Dave Chappelle; 2021: Bo Burnham: Inside – Bo Burnham
Writing for a Limited Series, Movie, or Dramatic Special	2017: Black Mirror: San Junipero – Charlie Brooker; 2018: Black Mirror: USS Callister – William Bridges and Charlie Brooker; 2023: Beef – Lee Sung Jin; 2024: Baby Reindeer – Richard Gadd; 2025: Adolescence – Jack Thorne and Stephen Graham

=== Grammy Awards ===
A Grammy Award (originally called Gramophone Award), or Grammy, is an honor awarded by The Recording Academy to recognize outstanding achievement in the mainly English-language music industry.

Category	Winners and Nominees
Song Written for Visual Media	2014: Orange Is the New Black – "You've Got Time" by Regina Spektor; 2020: Dumplin' – "Girl in the Movies" by Dolly Parton and Linda Perry; 2022: Bo Burnham: Inside (Winner) – "All Eyes On Me" by Bo Burnham; 2025: American Symphony (Winner) – "It Never Went Away" by Jon Batiste and Dan Wilson; 2026: KPop Demon Hunters (Winner) – "Golden" by Huntrix (Ejae, Audrey Nuna, Rei Ami)
Music Film	2016: What Happened, Miss Simone? – Liz Garbus, Amy Hobby, Jayson Jackson, and Justin Wilkes; 2019: Quincy (Winner) – Alan Hicks and Rashida Jones; 2020: Anima – Paul Thomas Anderson; 2020: Homecoming: A Film By Beyoncé (Winner) – Beyoncé and Ed Burke; 2022: Bo Burnham: Inside – Bo Burnham and Josh Senior; 2025: American Symphony (Winner) – Matthew Heineman; 2025: The Greatest Night in Pop – Bao Nguyen; 2026: Devo – Chris Smith
Score Soundtrack for Visual Media	2017: Stranger Things, Vol. 1 – Kyle Dixon and Michael Stein; 2017: Stranger Things, Vol. 2 – Kyle Dixon and Michael Stein; 2021: Becoming – Kamasi Washington; 2022: Bridgerton – Kris Bowers; 2022: The Queen's Gambit (Winner) – Carlos Rafael Rivera; 2023: The Power of the Dog – Jonny Greenwood

=== Golden Globe Awards ===
Golden Globe Awards are accolades bestowed by the ninety-three members of the Hollywood Foreign Press Association, recognizing excellence in film and television, both domestic and foreign. Films or programs streamed or produced by Netflix received 42 Golden Globe Awards from 278 nominations.

Category	Winners
Film
Motion Picture – Drama	2022: The Power of the Dog
Motion Picture – Musical or Comedy	2025: Emilia Pérez
Director	2019: Alfonso Cuarón – Roma; 2022: Jane Campion – The Power of the Dog
Screenplay	2021: Aaron Sorkin – The Trial of the Chicago 7
Actor – Drama	2021: Chadwick Boseman – Ma Rainey's Black Bottom
Actor – Comedy or Musical	2022: Andrew Garfield – tick, tick... Boom!
Actress – Comedy or Musical	2021: Rosamund Pike – I Care a Lot
Supporting Actor	2022: Kodi Smit-McPhee – The Power of the Dog
Supporting Actress	2020: Laura Dern – Marriage Story; 2025: Zoe Saldaña – Emilia Pérez
Foreign Language Film	2019: Roma; 2025: Emilia Pérez
Animated Feature Film	2023: Guillermo del Toro's Pinocchio; 2026: KPop Demon Hunters
Original Song	2021: “Io sì (Seen)" from The Life Ahead – Diane Warren and Laura Pausini; 2025: "El Mal" from Emilia Pérez – Clément Ducol, Camille, and Jacques Audiard; 2026: "Golden" from KPop Demon Hunters – Ejae, Mark Sonnenblick, Ido, 24, and Teddy
Television
Television Series – Drama	2017: The Crown; 2021: The Crown
Television Series – Musical or Comedy	2019: The Kominsky Method
Miniseries or Television Film	2021: The Queen's Gambit; 2024: Beef; 2025: Baby Reindeer; 2026: Adolescence
Actor – Television Series Drama	2015: Kevin Spacey – House of Cards; 2019: Richard Madden – Bodyguard; 2021: Josh O'Connor – The Crown
Actress – Television Series Drama	2014: Robin Wright – House of Cards; 2017: Claire Foy – The Crown; 2020: Olivia Colman – The Crown; 2021: Emma Corrin – The Crown
Actor – Television Series Musical or Comedy	2018: Aziz Ansari – Master of None; 2019: Michael Douglas – The Kominsky Method
Actor – Miniseries or Television Film	2023: Evan Peters – Monster: The Jeffrey Dahmer Story; 2024: Steven Yeun – Beef; 2026: Stephen Graham – Adolescence
Actress – Miniseries or Television Film	2021: Anya Taylor-Joy – The Queen's Gambit; 2024: Ali Wong – Beef
Supporting Actor	2022: O Yeong-su – Squid Game; 2026: Owen Cooper – Adolescence
Supporting Actress	2021: Gillian Anderson – The Crown; 2023: Julia Garner – Ozark; 2024: Elizabeth Debicki – The Crown; 2025: Jessica Gunning – Baby Reindeer; 2026: Erin Doherty – Adolescence

== Other awards ==
Screen Actors Guild Awards

The Screen Actors Guild Award (also known as the SAG Award) is an accolade given by the Screen Actors Guild‐American Federation of Television and Radio Artists (SAG-AFTRA) to recognize outstanding performances in film and television. The statuette is given, a nude male figure holding both a mask of comedy and a mask of tragedy, is called "The Actor".

British Academy of Film and Television Awards

The British Academy Film Awards and British Academy Television Awards are presented in an annual award show hosted by the British Academy of Film and Television Arts (BAFTA) to honour the best British and international contributions to film and Television.

America Film Institute Awards

The American Film Institute (AFI) is an organization that educates and honors the heritage of the motion picture arts in the United States. The organization is supported by private funding and public membership.

2013
- House of Cards
- Orange Is the New Black

2014
- Orange Is the New Black

2015
- Master of None

2016
- The Crown
- Stranger Things

2017
- The Crown
- Master of None
- Stranger Things

2018
- The Kominsky Method

2019

Films:

- The Irishman
- Marriage Story

Television Programs:

- The Crown
- Unbelievable
- When They See Us

2020

Films:

- Da 5 Bloods
- Ma Rainey's Black Bottom
- Mank
- The Trial of the Chicago 7

Television Programs:

- Bridgerton
- The Crown
- The Queens' Gambit
- Unorthodox

2021

Films:

- Don't Look Up
- The Power of the Dog
- tick, tick... Boom!

Television Programs:

- Squid Game (AFI Special Award)
- Maid

2022
- Mo

2023

Films:

- May December

Television Programs:

- Beef

2024

Films:

- Emilia Pérez

Television Programs:

- Baby Reindeer (AFI Special Award)
- A Man on the Inside
- Nobody Wants This

2025

Films:

- Frankenstein
- Jay Kelly
- Train Dreams

Television Programs:

- Adolescence
- Death by Lightning
- The Diplomat

Peabody Awards

The George Foster Peabody Awards (or simply Peabody Awards), named after George Peabody, honors stories in television, radio, and online media.

2013
- House of Cards
- Orange Is the New Black

2014
- Virunga

2015
- Jessica Jones
- Beasts of No Nation
- Master of None
- What Happened, Miss Simone?

2016
- 13th
- Audrie & Daisy
- Happy Valley
- Hip-Hop Evolution

2017
- American Vandal
- Chasing Coral
- Hasan Minhaj: Homecoming King
- A Series of Unfortunate Events

2018
- Nanette
- Patriot Act with Hasan Minhaj
- The End of the F***ing World

2019
- The Edge of Democracy
- Unbelievable
- When They See Us

2020
- Cops and Robbers
- Crip Camp
- Immigration Nation
- Unorthodox

2021
- Bo Burnham: Inside
- City of Ghosts
- High on the Hog: How African American Cuisine Transformed America

2022
- Mo

2024
- Baby Reindeer
- Daughters
- Mountain Queen: The Summits of Lhakpa Sherpa
- The Remarkable Life of Ibelin
- Ripley
- Will & Harper

Streamy Awards

The Streamy Awards are awards presented annually in recognition of excellence in streaming media. In 2020, Netflix won Brand of the Year at the 10th Streamy Awards.

== Critical reception ==
=== Critics' top ten lists ===
Year	Magazine / Newspaper					
Year	Los Angeles Times	The Boston Globe	Entertainment Weekly	The Huffington Post	Indiewire	Time
2013	Mary McNamara: 2. Orange is the New Black	Matthew Gilbert: 2. Orange is the New Black	Jeff Jensen: 6. Orange is the New Black; 8. House of Cards; 10. Arrested Development; Melissa Maerz: 4. Orange is the New Black; 9. House of Cards	Maureen Ryan – Orange is the New Black	Alison Willmore: 2. Orange is the New Black	James Poniewozik: 3. Orange is the New Black
2014	—	—	—	Maureen Ryan – Happy Valley – Orange is the New Black	Miller and Travers: 3. Orange is the New Black; 9. House of Cards; 10. BoJack Horseman	James Poniewozik: 4. Orange is the New Black
2015	Robert Lloyd: 9. Master of None (tie); 9. Unbreakable Kimmy Schmidt; Mary McNamara: 7. Jessica Jones	Matthew Gilbert: 2. Master of None	Jeff Jensen: 3. Unbreakable Kimmy Schmidt; 4. Master of None; Melissa Maerz: 3. BoJack Horseman; 8. Master of None	—	Kate Erbland: 1. Unbreakable Kimmy Schmidt; 2. Jessica Jones; Liz Shannon Miller: 7. Sense8	Daniel D’Addario: 6. Master of None
2016	Robert Lloyd – Easy – Lady Dynamite – Stranger Things	Matthew Gilbert: 3. The Crown; 4. Black Mirror	Jeff Jensen: 2. Unbreakable Kimmy Schmidt	Staff – The Crown – Lady Dynamite – Luke Cage – The OA – Stranger Things	Staff: 1. BoJack Horseman	Daniel D’Addario: 10. Love
2017	Lorraine Ali –The Keepers –Master of None –Stranger Things Robert Lloyd –GLOW –One Day at a Time –A Series of Unfortunate Events	Matthew Gilbert: 6. Alias Grace; 7. Master of None	—	—	Staff: 5. BoJack Horseman; 6. Dear White People; 9. Master of None; 10. American Vandal	Daniel D’Addario: 10. American Vandal
2018	Lorraine Ali: 4. The End of the F***ing World	—	Darren Franich: 8. Dear White People	—	Staff: 3. BoJack Horseman; 5. Dear White People	Judy Berman: 6. Terrace House: Opening New Doors
2019	Robert Lloyd –Russian Doll Lorraine Ali – Stranger Things	Matthew Gilbert: 3. Russian Doll; 6. Unbelievable; 7. Sex Education; 8. When They See Us	Krista Baldwin: 9. After Life; Darren Franich: 7. BoJack Horseman	—	Ben Travers: 4. Tuca & Bertie; 5. Russian Doll	Judy Berman: 6. When They See Us
2020	Robert Lloyd –Gentefied -The Midnight Gospel –The Queen's Gambit Lorraine Ali – Dead to Me – Never Have I Ever	Matthew Gilbert: 1. The Queen's Gambit; 3. Unorthodox; 7. The Crown	Krista Baldwin: 9. Never Have I Ever; Darren Franich: 2. The Midnight Gospel	—	Ben Travers: 5. BoJack Horseman; 9. The Baby Sitters Club	Judy Berman: 3. Immigration Nation 5. The Queen's Gambit

=== Rotten Tomatoes ===
Rotten Tomatoes is an American review aggregator website for film and television. Below are listed shows with multiple seasons with aggregate scores.

Year	Program	Season							Ref.
Year	Program	1	2	3	4	5	6	7	Ref.
2013	House of Cards	85%	88%	77%	87%	71%	67%	—N/a	
2013	Hemlock Grove	27%	50%	—N/a	—N/a	—N/a	—N/a	—N/a	
2013	Arrested Development	—N/a	—N/a	—N/a	27%	56%	—N/a	—N/a	
2013	Orange Is the New Black	95%	98%	96%	94%	71%	84%	97%	
2014	BoJack Horseman	67%	100%	100%	97%	98%	97%	—N/a	
2015	Unbreakable Kimmy Schmidt	95%	100%	97%	94%	—N/a	—N/a	—N/a	
2015	Daredevil	99%	81%	97%	—N/a	—N/a	—N/a	—N/a	
2015	Grace and Frankie	55%	91%	100%	100%	100%	100%	—N/a	
2015	Bloodline	80%	50%	29%	—N/a	—N/a	—N/a	—N/a	
2015	Sense8	67%	86%	—N/a	—N/a	—N/a	—N/a	—N/a	
2015	Narcos	78%	91%	100%	—N/a	—N/a	—N/a	—N/a	
2015	Master of None	100%	100%	80%	—N/a	—N/a	—N/a	—N/a	
2015	Jessica Jones	94%	82%	74%	—N/a	—N/a	—N/a	—N/a	
2016	Love	88%	95%	—N/a	—N/a	—N/a	—N/a	—N/a	
2016	Fuller House	35%	50%	—N/a	—N/a	—N/a	—N/a	—N/a	
2016	The Ranch	60%	67%	—N/a	—N/a	—N/a	—N/a	—N/a	
2016	Stranger Things	97%	94%	89%	—N/a	—N/a	—N/a	—N/a	
2016	Luke Cage	90%	85%	—N/a	—N/a	—N/a	—N/a	—N/a	
2016	Black Mirror	—N/a	—N/a	86%	86%	68%	—N/a	—N/a	
2016	The Crown	88%	89%	90%	96%	—N/a	—N/a	—N/a	
2017	A Series of Unfortunate Events	94%	94%	100%	—N/a	—N/a	—N/a	—N/a	
2017	One Day at a Time	94%	100%	100%	—N/a	—N/a	—N/a	—N/a	
2017	Santa Clarita Diet	78%	89%	100%	—N/a	—N/a	—N/a	—N/a	
2017	13 Reasons Why	79%	25%	12%	10%	—N/a	—N/a	—N/a	
2017	Dear White People	98%	100%	90%	50%	—N/a	—N/a	—N/a	
2017	GLOW	94%	98%	87%	—N/a	—N/a	—N/a	—N/a	
2017	Ozark	70%	76%	97%	—N/a	—N/a	—N/a	—N/a	
2017	Atypical	73%	88%	100%	100%	—N/a	—N/a	—N/a	
2017	Big Mouth	100%	100%	97%	100%	—N/a	—N/a	—N/a	
2017	Mindhunter	97%	98%	—N/a	—N/a	—N/a	—N/a	—N/a	
2018	Queer Eye	97%	86%	91%	91%	—N/a	—N/a	—N/a	
2018	Nailed It!	93%	—N/a	—N/a	—N/a	—N/a	—N/a	—N/a	
2018	On My Block	95%	100%	89%	—N/a	—N/a	—N/a	—N/a	
2018	Sugar Rush	100%	—N/a	—N/a	—N/a	—N/a	—N/a	—N/a	
2018	Insatiable	13%	—N/a	—N/a	—N/a	—N/a	—N/a	—N/a	
2018	The Kominsky Method	79%	100%	80%	—N/a	—N/a	—N/a	—N/a	
2018	Chilling Adventures of Sabrina	86%	79%	—N/a	—N/a	—N/a	—N/a	—N/a	
2019	Sex Education	91%	98%	100%	—N/a	—N/a	—N/a	—N/a	
2019	Russian Doll	97%	—N/a	—N/a	—N/a	—N/a	—N/a	—N/a	
2019	The Umbrella Academy	75%	90%	—N/a	—N/a	—N/a	—N/a	—N/a	
2019	After Life	73%	77%	—N/a	—N/a	—N/a	—N/a	—N/a	
2019	Special	96%	100%	—N/a	—N/a	—N/a	—N/a	—N/a	
2019	Dead to Me	86%	93%	—N/a	—N/a	—N/a	—N/a	—N/a	
2019	When They See Us	96%	—N/a	—N/a	—N/a	—N/a	—N/a	—N/a	
2019	Unbelievable	98%	—N/a	—N/a	—N/a	—N/a	—N/a	—N/a	
2019	The Politician	57%	40%	—N/a	—N/a	—N/a	—N/a	—N/a	
2019	The Witcher	67%	—N/a	—N/a	—N/a	—N/a	—N/a	—N/a	
2019	You	93%	88%	—N/a	—N/a	—N/a	—N/a	—N/a	
2020	The Circle US	80%	—N/a	—N/a	—N/a	—N/a	—N/a	—N/a	
2020	AJ and the Queen	52%	—N/a	—N/a	—N/a	—N/a	—N/a	—N/a	
2020	Locke & Key	66%	—N/a	—N/a	—N/a	—N/a	—N/a	—N/a	
2020	Self Made	77%	—N/a	—N/a	—N/a	—N/a	—N/a	—N/a	
2020	The English Game	53%	—N/a	—N/a	—N/a	—N/a	—N/a	—N/a	
2020	Unorthodox	96%	—N/a	—N/a	—N/a	—N/a	—N/a	—N/a	
2020	#blackAF	41%	—N/a	—N/a	—N/a	—N/a	—N/a	—N/a	
2020	Never Have I Ever	97%	93%	—N/a	—N/a	—N/a	—N/a	—N/a	
2020	Hollywood	57%	—N/a	—N/a	—N/a	—N/a	—N/a	—N/a	
2020	Space Force	38%	—N/a	—N/a	—N/a	—N/a	—N/a	—N/a	
2020	The Baby Sitters Club	100%	100%	—N/a	—N/a	—N/a	—N/a	—N/a	
2020	Julie and the Phantoms	93%	—N/a	—N/a	—N/a	—N/a	—N/a	—N/a	
2020	Ratched	61%	—N/a	—N/a	—N/a	—N/a	—N/a	—N/a	
2020	Emily in Paris	63%	—N/a	—N/a	—N/a	—N/a	—N/a	—N/a	
2020	The Queen's Gambit	97%	—N/a	—N/a	—N/a	—N/a	—N/a	—N/a	
2020	Dash & Lily	100%	—N/a	—N/a	—N/a	—N/a	—N/a	—N/a	
2020	Selena: The Series	33%	—N/a	—N/a	—N/a	—N/a	—N/a	—N/a	
2020	Bridgerton	89%	—N/a	—N/a	—N/a	—N/a	—N/a	—N/a	
2021	Firefly Lane	48%	—N/a	—N/a	—N/a	—N/a	—N/a	—N/a	
2021	Ginny & Georgia	68%	—N/a	—N/a	—N/a	—N/a	—N/a	—N/a	
2021	The Crew	38%	—N/a	—N/a	—N/a	—N/a	—N/a	—N/a	
2021	Country Comfort	60%	—N/a	—N/a	—N/a	—N/a	—N/a	—N/a	
2021	Halston	65%	—N/a	—N/a	—N/a	—N/a	—N/a	—N/a	
2021	Midnight Mass	91%	—N/a	—N/a	—N/a	—N/a	—N/a	—N/a	
2021	Squid Game	90%	—N/a	—N/a	—N/a	—N/a	—N/a	—N/a	
2021	Maid	96%	—N/a	—N/a	—N/a	—N/a	—N/a	—N/a	

=== Metacritic ===
Metacritic is a website that aggregates reviews of film, television and other media. The scores from each review are averaged (a weighted average). Below are listed shows with multiple seasons with aggregate scores.

Year	Program	Season						
Year	Program	1	2	3	4	5	6	7
2013	House of Cards	76	80	76	76	60	62	—N/a
2013	Hemlock Grove	45	37	—N/a	—N/a	—N/a	—N/a	—N/a
2013	Arrested Development	—N/a	—N/a	—N/a	67	60	—N/a	—N/a
2013	Orange Is the New Black	79	89	83	86	67	69	81
2014	Bojack Horseman	59	90	89	87	92	92	—N/a
2015	Unbreakable Kimmy Schmidt	78	82	78	85	—N/a	—N/a	—N/a
2015	Daredevil	75	68	71	—N/a	—N/a	—N/a	—N/a
2015	Grace and Frankie	58	62	—N/a	—N/a	—N/a	—N/a	—N/a
2015	Bloodline	75	60	—N/a	—N/a	—N/a	—N/a	—N/a
2015	Sense8	64	73	—N/a	—N/a	—N/a	—N/a	—N/a
2015	Narcos	77	76	78	—N/a	—N/a	—N/a	—N/a
2015	Master of None	91	91	—N/a	—N/a	—N/a	—N/a	—N/a
2015	Jessica Jones	81	70	65	—N/a	—N/a	—N/a	—N/a
2015	Making a Murderer	84	67	—N/a	—N/a	—N/a	—N/a	—N/a
2016	Love	72	80	77	—N/a	—N/a	—N/a	—N/a
2016	Fuller House	35	—N/a	—N/a	—N/a	—N/a	—N/a	—N/a
2016	The Ranch	56	—N/a	—N/a	—N/a	—N/a	—N/a	—N/a
2016	Stranger Things	76	78	72	—N/a	—N/a	—N/a	—N/a
2016	Black Mirror	—N/a	—N/a	82	76	66	—N/a	—N/a
2016	The Crown	81	87	84	85	—N/a	—N/a	—N/a
2017	One Day at a Time	79	88	82	—N/a	—N/a	—N/a	—N/a
2017	American Vandal	75	76	—N/a	—N/a	—N/a	—N/a	—N/a
2017	The Punisher	55	58	—N/a	—N/a	—N/a	—N/a	—N/a
2017	13 Reasons Why	76	49	23	—N/a	—N/a	—N/a	—N/a
2017	Dear White People	85	89	78	—N/a	—N/a	—N/a	—N/a
2017	GLOW	81	85	80	—N/a	—N/a	—N/a	—N/a
2017	Ozark	66	59	77	—N/a	—N/a	—N/a	—N/a
2017	Atypical	66	—N/a	—N/a	—N/a	—N/a	—N/a	—N/a
2017	Big Mouth	80	90	84	88	—N/a	—N/a	—N/a
2017	Mindhunter	79	85	—N/a	—N/a	—N/a	—N/a	—N/a
2018	Queer Eye	73	79	—N/a	—N/a	—N/a	—N/a	—N/a
2018	On My Block	69	—N/a	—N/a	—N/a	—N/a	—N/a	—N/a
2018	Insatiable	25	—N/a	—N/a	—N/a	—N/a	—N/a	—N/a
2018	The Kominsky Method	68	—N/a	—N/a	—N/a	—N/a	—N/a	—N/a
2018	Chilling Adventures of Sabrina	74	—N/a	—N/a	—N/a	—N/a	—N/a	—N/a
2019	Sex Education	79	83	—N/a	—N/a	—N/a	—N/a	—N/a
2019	Russian Doll	88	—N/a	—N/a	—N/a	—N/a	—N/a	—N/a
2019	The Umbrella Academy	61	67	—N/a	—N/a	—N/a	—N/a	—N/a
2019	After Life	59	62	—N/a	—N/a	—N/a	—N/a	—N/a
2019	Special	67	—N/a	—N/a	—N/a	—N/a	—N/a	—N/a
2019	Dead to Me	67	—N/a	—N/a	—N/a	—N/a	—N/a	—N/a
2019	When They See Us	86	—N/a	—N/a	—N/a	—N/a	—N/a	—N/a
2019	Unbelievable	83	—N/a	—N/a	—N/a	—N/a	—N/a	—N/a
2019	The Politician	67	72	—N/a	—N/a	—N/a	—N/a	—N/a
2019	The Witcher	53	—N/a	—N/a	—N/a	—N/a	—N/a	—N/a
2019	You	74	74	—N/a	—N/a	—N/a	—N/a	—N/a
2020	AJ and the Queen	46	—N/a	—N/a	—N/a	—N/a	—N/a	—N/a
2020	Locke & Key	61	—N/a	—N/a	—N/a	—N/a	—N/a	—N/a
2020	Self Made	64	—N/a	—N/a	—N/a	—N/a	—N/a	—N/a
2020	The English Game	62	—N/a	—N/a	—N/a	—N/a	—N/a	—N/a
2020	Unorthodox	85	—N/a	—N/a	—N/a	—N/a	—N/a	—N/a
2020	#blackAF	61	—N/a	—N/a	—N/a	—N/a	—N/a	—N/a
2020	Never Have I Ever	80	—N/a	—N/a	—N/a	—N/a	—N/a	—N/a
2020	Hollywood	59	—N/a	—N/a	—N/a	—N/a	—N/a	—N/a
2020	Space Force	49	—N/a	—N/a	—N/a	—N/a	—N/a	—N/a
2020	The Baby-Sitters Club	87	—N/a	—N/a	—N/a	—N/a	—N/a	—N/a
2020	Ratched	50	—N/a	—N/a	—N/a	—N/a	—N/a	—N/a
2020	Emily in Paris	58	—N/a	—N/a	—N/a	—N/a	—N/a	—N/a
2020	The Queen's Gambit	79	—N/a	—N/a	—N/a	—N/a	—N/a	—N/a
2020	Dash & Lily	80	—N/a	—N/a	—N/a	—N/a	—N/a	—N/a
2020	Selena: The Series	48	—N/a	—N/a	—N/a	—N/a	—N/a	—N/a
2020	Bridgerton	74	—N/a	—N/a	—N/a	—N/a	—N/a	—N/a
2021	Firefly Lane	57	—N/a	—N/a	—N/a	—N/a	—N/a	—N/a
2021	Ginny & Georgia	62	—N/a	—N/a	—N/a	—N/a	—N/a	—N/a
2021	The Crew	44	—N/a	—N/a	—N/a	—N/a	—N/a	—N/a

== Statistics ==
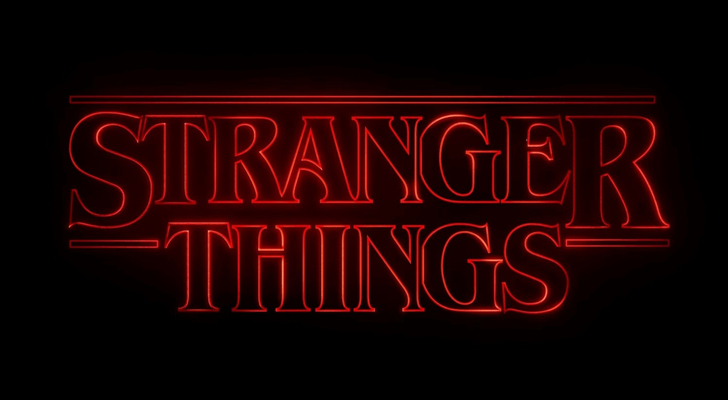
The Crown and Stranger Things are the shows with most awards won.

=== Series with most awards ===
Rank	Program	Seasons	Won	Nom
1	The Crown	6 Seasons	135	475
2	Stranger Things	5 Seasons	81	256
3	Orange Is the New Black	7 Seasons	46	165
4	House of Cards	6 Seasons	31	254

=== Person with most awards ===
Rank	Person	Role	Program	Won	Nom	Selected awards
1	Uzo Aduba	Actress	Orange Is the New Black	9	18	Primetime Emmy Award for Outstanding Guest Actress in a Comedy Series; Primetime Emmy Award for Outstanding Supporting Actress in a Drama Series; Screen Actors Guild Award for Outstanding Performance by a Female Actor in a Comedy Series; Screen Actors Guild Award for Outstanding Performance by an Ensemble in a Comedy Series; Nominated—Golden Globe Award for Best Supporting Actress – Series, Miniseries or Television Film
2	Taylor Schilling	Actress	Orange Is the New Black	7	14	Satellite Award for Best Actress – Television Series Musical or Comedy; Satellite Award for Best Cast – Television Series; Screen Actors Guild Award for Outstanding Performance by an Ensemble in a Comedy Series; Nominated—Primetime Emmy Award for Outstanding Lead Actress in a Comedy Series; Nominated—Golden Globe Award for Best Actress – Television Series Musical or Comedy
5	Tituss Burgess	Actor	Unbreakable Kimmy Schmidt	5	16	Webby Award for Best Actor; Nominated—Primetime Emmy Award for Outstanding Supporting Actor in a Comedy Series; Nominated—Critics' Choice Television Award for Best Supporting Actor in a Comedy Series; Nominated—Screen Actors Guild Award for Outstanding Performance by a Male Actor in a Comedy Series; Nominated–NCAAP Award for Outstanding Supporting Actor in a Comedy Series
4	Kevin Spacey	Actor; Producer	House of Cards	4	41	Golden Globe Award for Best Actor – Television Series Drama; Screen Actors Guild Award for Outstanding Performance by a Male Actor in a Drama Series; Nominated—Screen Actors Guild Award for Outstanding Performance by an Ensemble in a Drama Series; Nominated—Primetime Emmy Award for Outstanding Drama Series; Nominated—Primetime Emmy Award for Outstanding Lead Actor in a Drama Series
5	Robin Wright	Actress; Producer; Director	House of Cards	4	37	Golden Globe Award for Best Actress – Television Series Drama; Satellite Award for Best Actress – Television Series Drama; Nominated—Primetime Emmy Award for Outstanding Drama Series; Nominated—Primetime Emmy Award for Outstanding Lead Actress in a Drama Series; Nominated—Screen Actors Guild Award for Outstanding Performance by a Female Actor in a Drama Series

== Awards by programming ==
Drama series

- List of awards received by Bloodline
- List of awards received by The Crown
- List of awards received by Daredevil
- List of awards received by The Get Down
- List of awards received by House of Cards
- List of awards received by Jessica Jones
- List of awards received by Luke Cage
- List of awards received by Marco Polo
- List of awards received by Narcos
- List of awards received by The OA
- List of awards received by Orange Is the New Black
- List of awards received by Sense8
- List of awards received by A Series of Unfortunate Events
- List of awards received by Stranger Things

Docuseries

- List of awards received by Chef's Table
- List of awards received by Five Came Back
- List of awards received by Making a Murderer

Comedy series

- List of awards received by Arrested Development (season 4)
- List of awards received by Fuller House
- List of awards received by Grace and Frankie
- List of awards received by Lady Dynamite
- List of awards received by Love
- List of awards received by Master of None
- List of awards received by One Day at a Time
- List of awards received by The Ranch
- List of awards received by Unbreakable Kimmy Schmidt

Long Form

- List of awards received by Black Mirror
- List of awards received by Gilmore Girls: A Year in the Life

Animated series

- List of awards received by BoJack Horseman
- List of awards received by F Is for Family

== See also ==
- List of TCA Awards received by Netflix
- List of Critics' Choice Awards received by Netflix
