= List of awards and nominations received by Unbreakable Kimmy Schmidt =

Unbreakable Kimmy Schmidt awards and nominations
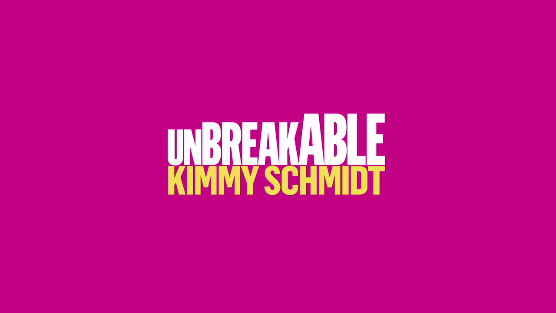
Awards and nominations
Award	Wins	Nominations
Artios Awards	0	2
Black Reel Awards	1	1
Critics' Choice Television Awards	1	8
Dorian Awards	0	2
Gotham Awards	0	1
Gracie Allen Awards	2	2
NAACP Image Awards	0	2
People's Choice Awards	0	5
Primetime Emmy Awards	0	20
Satellite Awards	0	4
Screen Actors Guild Awards	0	3
TCA Awards	0	1
Webby Awards	2	2
Writers Guild of America Awards	1	6

Totals (Note: Certain award groups do not simply award one winner. They acknowledge several different recipients, have runners-up, and have third place. Since this is a specific recognition and is different from losing an award, runner-up mentions are considered wins in this award tally. For simplification and to avoid errors, each award in this list has been presumed to have had a prior nomination.)
- Wins: 7
- Nominations: 59

Unbreakable Kimmy Schmidt is an American web television sitcom created by Tina Fey and Robert Carlock, starring Ellie Kemper in the title role, that has streamed on Netflix since March 6, 2015. Originally set for a 13-episode first season on NBC for spring 2015, the show was sold to Netflix and given a two-season order. It ran for four seasons, ending on January 25, 2019. An interactive special premiered on May 12, 2020.

Throughout its run, the series received critical acclaim, with critic Scott Meslow calling it "the first great sitcom of the streaming era". The series received a total of 20 Primetime Emmy Award nominations, including four nominations for Outstanding Comedy Series.

== Awards and nominations ==
Awards and nominations received by Unbreakable Kimmy Schmidt
Award	Year	Category	Nominee(s)	Result	Ref.
Artios Awards	2016	Outstanding Achievement in Casting – Television Pilot Comedy	Jennifer Euston and Emer O'Callaghan	Nominated	
Artios Awards	2017	Outstanding Achievement in Casting – Television Series Comedy	Cindy Tolan and Anne Davison	Nominated	
Black Reel Awards	2017	Outstanding Supporting Actor, Comedy Series	Tituss Burgess	Won	
Critics' Choice Television Awards	2015	Best Supporting Actor in a Comedy Series	Tituss Burgess	Nominated	
Critics' Choice Television Awards	2016	Best Comedy Series	Unbreakable Kimmy Schmidt	Nominated	
Critics' Choice Television Awards	2016	Best Actress in a Comedy Series	Ellie Kemper	Nominated	
Critics' Choice Television Awards	2016	Best Supporting Actor in a Comedy Series	Tituss Burgess	Nominated	
Critics' Choice Television Awards	2016	Best Supporting Actress in a Comedy Series	Jane Krakowski	Won	
Critics' Choice Television Awards	2016	Best Guest Performer in a Comedy Series	Lisa Kudrow	Nominated	
Critics' Choice Television Awards	2017	Best Actress in a Comedy Series	Ellie Kemper	Nominated	
Critics' Choice Television Awards	2017	Best Supporting Actor in a Comedy Series	Tituss Burgess	Nominated	
Dorian Awards	2015	TV Comedy of the Year	Unbreakable Kimmy Schmidt	Nominated	
Dorian Awards	2015	TV Performance of the Year - Actor	Tituss Burgess	Nominated	
Gotham Awards	2015	Breakthrough Series – Long Form	Unbreakable Kimmy Schmidt	Nominated	
Gracie Allen Awards	2016	Outstanding Female Actor in a Leading Role in a Comedy or Musical	Ellie Kemper	Won	
Gracie Allen Awards	2016	Outstanding Female Actor in a Featured/Guest Role	Tina Fey	Won	
NAACP Image Awards	2017	Outstanding Supporting Actor in a Comedy Series	Tituss Burgess	Nominated	
NAACP Image Awards	2018	Outstanding Supporting Actor in a Comedy Series	Tituss Burgess	Nominated	
People's Choice Awards	2016	Favorite Streaming Series	Unbreakable Kimmy Schmidt	Nominated	
People's Choice Awards	2017	Favorite Premium Comedy Series	Unbreakable Kimmy Schmidt	Nominated	
People's Choice Awards	2018	The Comedy Show of 2018	Unbreakable Kimmy Schmidt	Shortlisted	
People's Choice Awards	2018	The Comedy TV Star of 2018	Ellie Kemper	Shortlisted	
People's Choice Awards	2018	The Bingeworthy Show of 2018	Unbreakable Kimmy Schmidt	Shortlisted	
Primetime Emmy Awards	2015	Outstanding Comedy Series	Unbreakable Kimmy Schmidt	Nominated	
Primetime Emmy Awards	2015	Outstanding Supporting Actor in a Comedy Series	Tituss Burgess	Nominated	
Primetime Emmy Awards	2015	Outstanding Supporting Actress in a Comedy Series	Jane Krakowski	Nominated	
Primetime Emmy Awards	2016	Outstanding Comedy Series	Unbreakable Kimmy Schmidt	Nominated	
Primetime Emmy Awards	2016	Outstanding Lead Actress in a Comedy Series	Ellie Kemper	Nominated	
Primetime Emmy Awards	2016	Outstanding Supporting Actor in a Comedy Series	Tituss Burgess	Nominated	
Primetime Emmy Awards	2017	Outstanding Comedy Series	Unbreakable Kimmy Schmidt	Nominated	
Primetime Emmy Awards	2017	Outstanding Lead Actress in a Comedy Series	Ellie Kemper	Nominated	
Primetime Emmy Awards	2017	Outstanding Supporting Actor in a Comedy Series	Tituss Burgess	Nominated	
Primetime Emmy Awards	2018	Outstanding Comedy Series	Unbreakable Kimmy Schmidt	Nominated	
Primetime Emmy Awards	2018	Outstanding Supporting Actor in a Comedy Series	Tituss Burgess	Nominated	
Primetime Emmy Awards	2020	Outstanding Television Movie	Kimmy vs. The Reverend	Nominated	
Primetime Emmy Awards	2020	Outstanding Supporting Actor in a Limited Series or Movie	Tituss Burgess	Nominated	
Primetime Creative Arts Emmy Awards	2015	Outstanding Guest Actress in a Comedy Series	Tina Fey (for "Kimmy Goes to Court!")	Nominated	
Primetime Creative Arts Emmy Awards	2015	Outstanding Guest Actor in a Comedy Series	Jon Hamm (for "Kimmy Makes Waffles!")	Nominated	
Primetime Creative Arts Emmy Awards	2015	Outstanding Casting for a Comedy Series	Jennifer Euston	Nominated	
Primetime Creative Arts Emmy Awards	2015	Outstanding Stunt Coordination for a Comedy Series or Variety Program	Jill Brown	Nominated	
Primetime Creative Arts Emmy Awards	2016	Outstanding Casting for a Comedy Series	Cindy Tolan	Nominated	
Primetime Creative Arts Emmy Awards	2017	Outstanding Stunt Coordination for a Comedy Series or Variety Program		Nominated	
Primetime Creative Arts Emmy Awards	2017	Outstanding Original Music and Lyrics	Jeff Richmond, Tina Fey, and Sam Means (for "Kimmy's Roommate Lemonades!")	Nominated	
Satellite Awards	2016	Best Television Series – Musical or Comedy	Unbreakable Kimmy Schmidt	Nominated	
Satellite Awards	2017	Best Television Series – Musical or Comedy	Unbreakable Kimmy Schmidt	Nominated	
Satellite Awards	2017	Best Actress – Television Series Musical or Comedy	Ellie Kemper	Nominated	
Satellite Awards	2018	Best Actress – Television Series Musical or Comedy	Ellie Kemper	Nominated	
Screen Actors Guild Awards	2016	Outstanding Performance by a Female Actor in a Comedy Series	Ellie Kemper	Nominated	
Screen Actors Guild Awards	2017	Outstanding Performance by a Male Actor in a Comedy Series	Tituss Burgess	Nominated	
Screen Actors Guild Awards	2017	Outstanding Performance by a Female Actor in a Comedy Series	Ellie Kemper	Nominated	
Television Critics Association Awards	2015	Outstanding Achievement in Comedy	Unbreakable Kimmy Schmidt	Nominated	
Webby Awards	2015	Best Actress	Ellie Kemper	Won	
Webby Awards	2015	Best Actor	Tituss Burgess	Won	
Writers Guild of America Awards	2015	Television: Comedy Series	Unbreakable Kimmy Schmidt	Nominated	
Writers Guild of America Awards	2015	Television: New Series	Unbreakable Kimmy Schmidt	Nominated	
Writers Guild of America Awards	2016	Television: Comedy Series	Unbreakable Kimmy Schmidt	Nominated	
Writers Guild of America Awards	2016	Television: Episodic Comedy	Robert Carlock (for "Kimmy Goes on a Playdate!")	Won	
Writers Guild of America Awards	2016	Television: Episodic Comedy	Tina Fey and Sam Means (for "Kimmy Finds Her Mom!")	Nominated	
Writers Guild of America Awards	2018	Television: Episodic Comedy	Robert Carlock (for "Kimmy and the Beest!")	Nominated	
