= List of awards and nominations received by Orange Is the New Black =

List of Orange Is the New Black awards
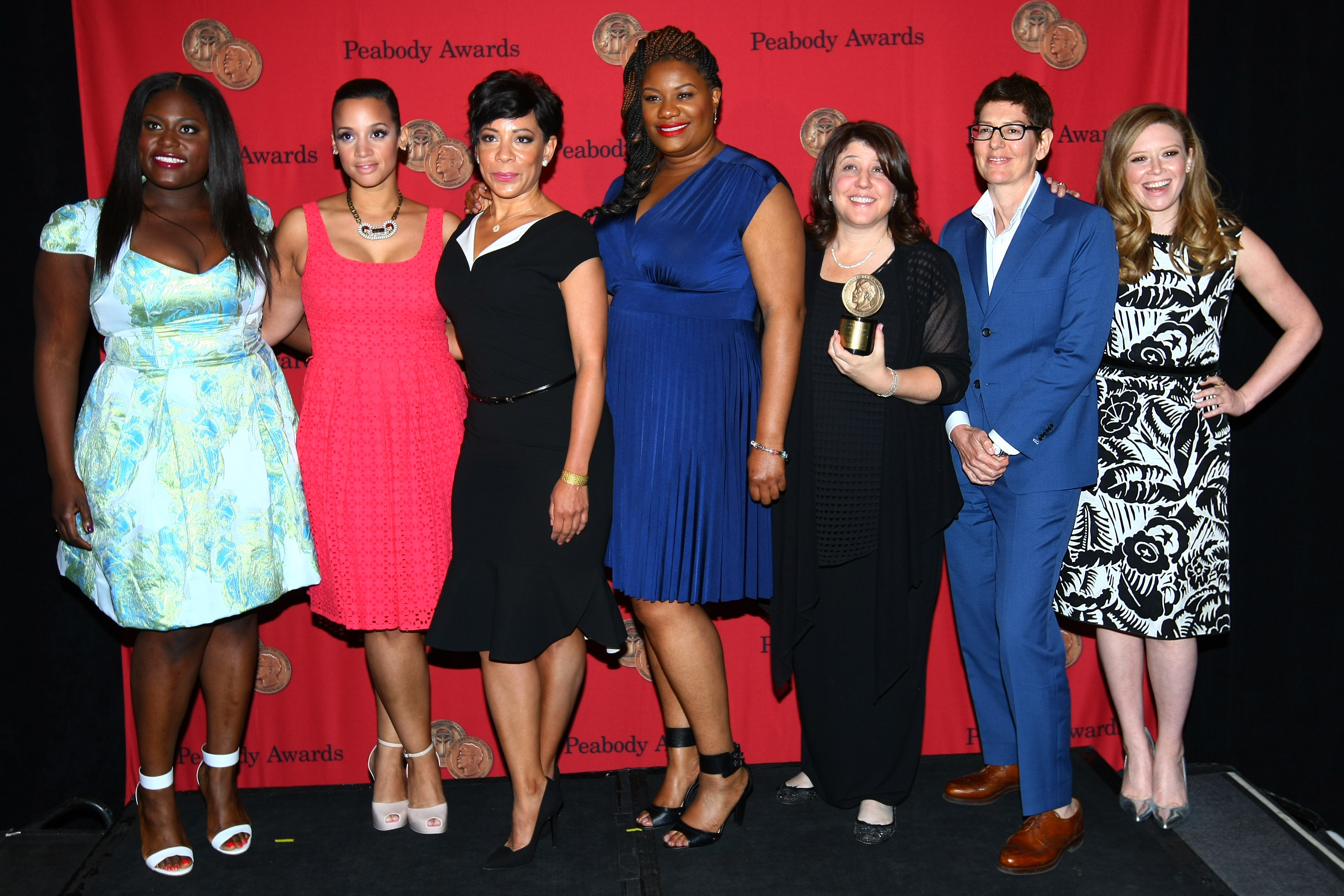
- Cast and crew at the Peabody Awards
Awards and nominations
| Award | Wins | Nominations |
| ALMA Awards | 2 | 2 |
| American Cinema Editors Awards | 0 | 1 |
| American Film Institute Awards | 2 | 2 |
| ASCAP Music Awards | 1 | 1 |
| Artios Awards | 2 | 5 |
| Black Reel Awards | 0 | 1 |
| British Academy Film Awards | 0 | 1 |
| Crime Thriller Awards | 0 | 1 |
| Critics' Choice Television Awards | 4 | 7 |
| Directors Guild of America Awards | 0 | 1 |
| Dorian Awards | 3 | 9 |
| Emmy Awards | 4 | 19 |
| GLAAD Media Awards | 1 | 3 |
| Golden Globe Awards | 0 | 6 |
| Gracie Allen Awards | 1 | 1 |
| Grammy Awards | 0 | 1 |
| Guild of Music Supervisors Awards | 0 | 1 |
| IGN Awards | 0 | 1 |
| Makeup Artist and Hair Stylist Guild Awards | 0 | 2 |
| NAACP Image Awards | 1 | 13 |
| NewNowNext Awards | 1 | 1 |
| Peabody Awards | 1 | 1 |
| People's Choice Awards | 4 | 5 |
| Producers Guild of America Awards | 1 | 1 |
| Satellite Awards | 6 | 10 |
| Screen Actors Guild Awards | 5 | 6 |
| Screenwriters Choice Awards | 0 | 2 |
| TCA Awards | 1 | 2 |
| Writers Guild of America Awards | 0 | 6 |

Totals (Note: Certain award groups do not simply award one winner. They acknowledge several different recipients, have runners-up, and have third place. Since this is a specific recognition and is different from losing an award, runner-up mentions are considered wins in this award tally. For simplification and to avoid errors, each award in this list has been presumed to have had a prior nomination.)
- Wins: 46
- Nominations: 165

Orange Is the New Black is an American comedy-drama series created by Jenji Kohan. It is based on Piper Kerman's memoir, Orange Is the New Black: My Year in a Women's Prison (2010), about her experiences at FCI Danbury, a minimum-security federal women's prison. The series' first season premiered on July 11, 2013, on the streaming service Netflix. Orange Is the New Black has been a significant success for Netflix, becoming its most-watched original series. The series has received critical acclaim since its debut, and many awards and nominations in both comedy and drama categories.

Orange Is the New Black has received 16 Emmy Award nominations and four wins. For its first season, the series received 12 Emmy Award nominations, including Outstanding Comedy Series, Outstanding Writing for a Comedy Series, and Outstanding Directing for a Comedy Series, winning three. After an Emmy rule change in 2015 classifying half-hour shows as comedies and hour-long shows as dramas, the series received four Emmy nominations in drama for its second season, including Outstanding Drama Series, and Uzo Aduba won for Outstanding Supporting Actress in a Drama Series. Orange Is the New Black became the first series to receive Emmy nominations in both comedy and drama categories. Aduba's win made her the first actress, and second actor ever, to win drama and comedy Emmy awards for the same role, following her win for Outstanding Guest Actress in a Comedy Series the previous year.

The series has also received six Golden Globe Award nominations, six Writers Guild of America Award nominations, a British Academy Television Award nomination, as well as four Screen Actors Guild Awards (including two for Outstanding Performance by an Ensemble in a Comedy Series), four Critics' Choice Television Awards, two GLAAD Media Awards, a Television Critics Association Award, a Producers Guild of America Award, and a Peabody Award.

== Total nominations and awards for the cast ==
| Actor | Character | Tenure | Awards | |
| Actor | Character | Tenure | Won | Nom |
|---|---|---|---|---|
| Uzo Aduba | Suzanne "Crazy Eyes" Warren | Season 1–7 | 10 | 28 |
| Taylor Schilling | Piper Chapman | Season 1–7 | 8 | 20 |
| Kate Mulgrew | Galina "Red" Reznikova | Season 1–7 | 7 | 14 |
| Laura Prepon | Alex Vause | Season 1–7 | 6 | 12 |
| Natasha Lyonne | Nicky Nichols | Season 1–7 | 4 | 13 |
| Laverne Cox | Sophia Burset | Season 1–7 | 2 | 12 |

== Awards and nominations ==
List of awards and nominations for Orange Is the New Black
| Award | Year | Category | Nominee(s) | Result | Ref. |
|---|---|---|---|---|---|
| ALMA Awards | 2014 | Special Achievement in Television | Selenis Leyva | Won | |
| ALMA Awards | 2014 | Special Achievement in Television | Dascha Polanco | Won | |
| American Cinema Editors Awards | 2016 | Best Edited Mini-Series or Motion Picture for Television | Jeffrey M. Werner (for "Trust No Bitch") | Nominated | |
| American Film Institute Awards | 2013 | Top 10 Television Programs | Orange Is the New Black | Won | |
| American Film Institute Awards | 2014 | Top 10 Television Programs | Orange Is the New Black | Won | |
| ASCAP Music Awards | 2015 | Top Television Series | Scott Doherty and Brandon Jay | Won | |
| Artios Awards | 2014 | Outstanding Achievement in Casting – Television Series Comedy | Jennifer Euston and Emer O'Callaghan | Won | |
| Artios Awards | 2014 | Outstanding Achievement in Casting – Television Pilot Comedy | Jennifer Euston | Won | |
| Artios Awards | 2015 | Outstanding Achievement in Casting – Television Series Comedy | Jennifer Euston and Emer O'Callaghan | Nominated | |
| Artios Awards | 2016 | Outstanding Achievement in Casting – Television Series Comedy | Jennifer Euston and Emer O'Callaghan | Nominated | |
| Artios Awards | 2017 | Outstanding Achievement in Casting – Television Series Drama | Jennifer Euston and Emer O'Callaghan | Nominated | |
| Black Reel Awards | 2017 | Outstanding Supporting Actress, Drama Series | Uzo Aduba | Nominated | |
| British Academy Television Awards | 2015 | Best International Programme | Producers: Jenji Kohan Lisa I.Vinnecour Sara Hess Sian Heder | Nominated | |
| Crime Thriller Awards | 2014 | Best International TV Drama | Orange Is the New Black | Nominated | |
| Critics' Choice Television Awards | 2014 | Best Comedy Series | Orange Is the New Black | Won | |
| Critics' Choice Television Awards | 2014 | Best Supporting Actress in a Comedy Series | Laverne Cox | Nominated | |
| Critics' Choice Television Awards | 2014 | Best Supporting Actress in a Comedy Series | Kate Mulgrew | Won | |
| Critics' Choice Television Awards | 2014 | Best Guest Performer in a Comedy Series | Uzo Aduba | Won | |
| Critics' Choice Television Awards | 2015 | Best Drama Series | Orange Is the New Black | Nominated | |
| Critics' Choice Television Awards | 2015 | Best Supporting Actress in a Drama Series | Lorraine Toussaint | Won | |
| Critics' Choice Television Awards | 2015 | Most Bingeworthy Show | Orange Is the New Black | Nominated | |
| Directors Guild of America Awards | 2014 | Outstanding Directing – Comedy Series | Jodie Foster (for "Thirsty Bird") | Nominated | |
| Dorian Awards | 2013 | TV Drama of the Year | Orange Is the New Black | Won | |
| Dorian Awards | 2013 | LGBTQ TV Show of the Year | Orange Is the New Black | Won | |
| Dorian Awards | 2013 | TV Performance of the Year – Actress | Taylor Schilling | Nominated | |
| Dorian Awards | 2014 | TV Drama of the Year | Orange Is the New Black | Nominated | |
| Dorian Awards | 2014 | LGBTQ TV Show of the Year | Orange Is the New Black | Nominated | |
| Dorian Awards | 2014 | TV Director of the Year | Jodie Foster | Nominated | |
| Dorian Awards | 2015 | TV Drama of the Year | Orange Is the New Black | Won | |
| Dorian Awards | 2015 | LGBTQ TV Show of the Year | Orange Is the New Black | Nominated | |
| Dorian Awards | 2016 | LGBTQ TV Show of the Year | Orange Is the New Black | Nominated | |
| Gracie Awards | 2015 | Outstanding Comedy | Orange Is the New Black | Won | |
| GLAAD Media Awards | 2014 | Outstanding Comedy Series | Orange Is the New Black | Won | |
| GLAAD Media Awards | 2015 | Outstanding Comedy Series | Orange Is the New Black | Nominated | |
| GLAAD Media Awards | 2016 | Outstanding Comedy Series | Orange Is the New Black | Nominated | |
| Guild of Music Supervisors Awards | 2015 | Best Music Supervision in a Television Musical or Comedy | Bruce Gilbert | Nominated | |
| Golden Globe Awards | 2014 | Best Actress – Television Series Drama | Taylor Schilling | Nominated | |
| Golden Globe Awards | 2015 | Best Television Series – Musical or Comedy | Orange Is the New Black | Nominated | |
| Golden Globe Awards | 2015 | Best Actress – Television Series Musical or Comedy | Taylor Schilling | Nominated | |
| Golden Globe Awards | 2015 | Best Supporting Actress – Series, Miniseries or Television Film | Uzo Aduba | Nominated | |
| Golden Globe Awards | 2016 | Best Television Series – Musical or Comedy | Orange Is the New Black | Nominated | |
| Golden Globe Awards | 2016 | Best Supporting Actress – Series, Miniseries or Television Film | Uzo Aduba | Nominated | |
| Grammy Awards | 2014 | Best Song Written for Visual Media | Regina Spektor (for "You've Got Time") | Nominated | |
| Hollywood Music in Media Awards | 2016 | Best Outstanding Music Supervision – Television | Bruce Gilbert | Nominated | |
| IGN Awards | 2016 | Best Streaming Exclusive | Orange Is the New Black | Nominated | |
| Make-Up Artists & Hair Stylists Guild Awards | 2015 | Best Contemporary Makeup – Television and New Media Series | Michal Bigger and Karen Reuter Fabbo | Nominated | |
| Make-Up Artists & Hair Stylists Guild Awards | 2015 | Best Contemporary Hair Styling – Television and New Media Series | Angel De Angelis and Valerie Velez | Nominated | |
| NAACP Image Awards | 2014 | Outstanding Writing in a Dramatic Series | Sara Hess (for "Blood Donut") | Nominated | |
| NAACP Image Awards | 2015 | Outstanding Comedy Series | Orange Is the New Black | Nominated | |
| NAACP Image Awards | 2015 | Outstanding Actress in a Comedy Series | Uzo Aduba | Nominated | |
| NAACP Image Awards | 2015 | Outstanding Supporting Actress in a Comedy Series | Laverne Cox | Nominated | |
| NAACP Image Awards | 2015 | Outstanding Supporting Actress in a Comedy Series | Adrienne C. Moore | Nominated | |
| NAACP Image Awards | 2015 | Outstanding Supporting Actress in a Comedy Series | Lorraine Toussaint | Nominated | |
| NAACP Image Awards | 2015 | Outstanding Writing in a Comedy Series | Sara Hess (for "It Was the Change") | Won | |
| NAACP Image Awards | 2016 | Outstanding Comedy Series | Orange Is the New Black | Nominated | |
| NAACP Image Awards | 2016 | Outstanding Actress in a Comedy Series | Uzo Aduba | Nominated | |
| NAACP Image Awards | 2016 | Outstanding Supporting Actress in a Comedy Series | Danielle Brooks | Nominated | |
| NAACP Image Awards | 2016 | Outstanding Supporting Actress in a Comedy Series | Laverne Cox | Nominated | |
| NAACP Image Awards | 2017 | Outstanding Actress in a Comedy Series | Uzo Aduba | Nominated | |
| NAACP Image Awards | 2017 | Outstanding Supporting Actress in a Comedy Series | Laverne Cox | Nominated | |
| NAACP Image Awards | 2018 | Outstanding Supporting Actress in a Comedy Series | Uzo Aduba | Nominated | |
| NewNowNext Awards | 2014 | Best New Television Actress | Lorraine Toussaint | Won | |
| Peabody Awards | 2013 | Honoree | Orange Is the New Black | Won | |
| People's Choice Awards | 2014 | Favorite Streaming Series | Orange Is the New Black | Won | |
| People's Choice Awards | 2015 | Favorite TV Dramedy | Orange Is the New Black | Won | |
| People's Choice Awards | 2016 | Favorite Streaming Series | Orange Is the New Black | Won | |
| People's Choice Awards | 2017 | Favorite Premium Drama Series | Orange Is the New Black | Won | |
| People's Choice Awards | 2017 | Favorite Premium Series Actress | Taylor Schilling | Nominated | |
| Primetime Emmy Awards | 2014 | Outstanding Comedy Series | Orange Is the New Black | Nominated | |
| Primetime Emmy Awards | 2014 | Outstanding Lead Actress in a Comedy Series | Taylor Schilling | Nominated | |
| Primetime Emmy Awards | 2014 | Outstanding Supporting Actress in a Comedy Series | Kate Mulgrew | Nominated | |
| Primetime Emmy Awards | 2014 | Outstanding Directing for a Comedy Series | Jodie Foster (for "Lesbian Request Denied") | Nominated | |
| Primetime Emmy Awards | 2014 | Outstanding Writing for a Comedy Series | Liz Friedman and Jenji Kohan (for "I Wasn't Ready") | Nominated | |
| Primetime Emmy Awards | 2015 | Outstanding Drama Series | Orange Is the New Black | Nominated | |
| Primetime Emmy Awards | 2015 | Outstanding Supporting Actress in a Drama Series | Uzo Aduba | Won | |
| Primetime Emmy Awards | 2017 | Outstanding Supporting Actress in a Drama Series | Uzo Aduba | Nominated | |
| Primetime Creative Arts Emmy Awards | 2014 | Outstanding Guest Actress in a Comedy Series | Uzo Aduba (for "Lesbian Request Denied") | Won | |
| Primetime Creative Arts Emmy Awards | 2014 | Outstanding Guest Actress in a Comedy Series | Laverne Cox (for "Lesbian Request Denied") | Nominated | |
| Primetime Creative Arts Emmy Awards | 2014 | Outstanding Guest Actress in a Comedy Series | Natasha Lyonne (for "WAC Pack") | Nominated | |
| Primetime Creative Arts Emmy Awards | 2014 | Outstanding Casting for a Comedy Series | Jennifer Euston | Won | |
| Primetime Creative Arts Emmy Awards | 2014 | Outstanding Single-Camera Picture Editing for a Comedy Series | William Turro (for "Tit Punch") | Won | |
| Primetime Creative Arts Emmy Awards | 2014 | Outstanding Single-Camera Picture Editing for a Comedy Series | Shannon Mitchell (for "Tall Men With Feelings") | Nominated | |
| Primetime Creative Arts Emmy Awards | 2014 | Outstanding Single-Camera Picture Editing for a Comedy Series | Michael S. Stern (for "Can't Fix Crazy") | Nominated | |
| Primetime Creative Arts Emmy Awards | 2015 | Outstanding Guest Actor in a Drama Series | Pablo Schreiber (for "40 Oz. of Furlough") | Nominated | |
| Primetime Creative Arts Emmy Awards | 2015 | Outstanding Casting for a Drama Series | Jennifer Euston | Nominated | |
| Primetime Creative Arts Emmy Awards | 2016 | Outstanding Casting for a Drama Series | Jennifer Euston | Nominated | |
| Primetime Creative Arts Emmy Awards | 2017 | Outstanding Guest Actress in a Drama Series | Laverne Cox (for "Doctor Psycho") | Nominated | |
| Primetime Creative Arts Emmy Awards | 2019 | Outstanding Guest Actress in a Drama Series | Laverne Cox (for "Well This Took a Dark Turn") | Nominated | |
| Primetime Creative Arts Emmy Awards | 2020 | Outstanding Guest Actress in a Drama Series | Laverne Cox (for "God Bless America") | Nominated | |
| Producers Guild of America Awards | 2015 | Best Episodic Comedy | Producers: Mark A. Burley, Sara Hess, Jenji Kohan, Gary Lennon, Neri Tannenbaum, Michael Trim, Lisa I. Vinnecour | Won | |
| Satellite Awards | 2013 | Best Television Series – Musical or Comedy | Orange Is the New Black | Won | |
| Satellite Awards | 2013 | Best Actress – Television Series Musical or Comedy | Taylor Schilling | Won | |
| Satellite Awards | 2013 | Best Supporting Actress – Series, Miniseries or Television Film | Uzo Aduba | Nominated | |
| Satellite Awards | 2013 | Best Supporting Actress – Series, Miniseries or Television Film | Laura Prepon | Won | |
| Satellite Awards | 2013 | Best Cast – Television Series | Cast: Taylor Schilling, Laura Prepon, Michael J. Harney, Michelle Hurst, Kate Mulgrew, and Jason Biggs | Won | |
| Satellite Awards | 2014 | Best Television Series – Musical or Comedy | Orange Is the New Black | Nominated | |
| Satellite Awards | 2014 | Best Actress – Television Series Musical or Comedy | Taylor Schilling | Nominated | |
| Satellite Awards | 2015 | Best Actress – Television Series Musical or Comedy | Taylor Schilling | Won | |
| Satellite Awards | 2016 | Best Television Series – Musical or Comedy | Orange Is the New Black | Nominated | |
| Satellite Awards | 2016 | Best Actress – Television Series Musical or Comedy | Taylor Schilling | Won | |
| Satellite Awards | 2017 | Best Television Series – Musical or Comedy | Orange Is the New Black | Nominated | |
| Satellite Awards | 2017 | Best Supporting Actress in a Series, Miniseries or TV Film | Danielle Brooks | Nominated | |
| Screen Actors Guild Awards | 2015 | Outstanding Performance by an Ensemble in a Comedy Series | Ensemble: Uzo Aduba Jason Biggs Danielle Brooks Laverne Cox Jackie Cruz Catherine Curtin Lea DeLaria Beth Fowler Yvette Freeman Germar Terrell Gardner Kimiko Glenn Annie Golden Diane Guerrero Michael J. Harney Vicky Jeudy Julie Lake Lauren Lapkus Selenis Leyva Natasha Lyonne Taryn Manning Joel Marsh Garland Matt McGorry Adrienne C. Moore Kate Mulgrew Emma Myles Jessica Pimentel Dascha Polanco Alysia Reiner Judith Roberts Elizabeth Rodriguez Barbara Rosenblat Nick Sandow Abigail Savage Taylor Schilling Constance Shulman Dale Soules Yael Stone Lorraine Toussaint Lin Tucci Samira Wiley | Won | |
| Screen Actors Guild Awards | 2015 | Outstanding Performance by a Female Actor in a Comedy Series | Uzo Aduba | Won | |
| Screen Actors Guild Awards | 2016 | Outstanding Performance by an Ensemble in a Comedy Series | Ensemble: Uzo Aduba Mike Birbiglia Marsha Stephanie Blake Danielle Brooks Laverne Cox Jackie Cruz Catherine Curtin Lea DeLaria Beth Fowler Joel Marsh Garland Kimiko Glenn Annie Golden Diane Guerrero Michael J. Harney Vicky Jeudy Selenis Leyva Taryn Manning Adrienne C. Moore Kate Mulgrew Emma Myles Matt Peters Lori Petty Jessica Pimentel Dascha Polanco Laura Prepon Elizabeth Rodriguez Ruby Rose Nick Sandow Abigail Savage Taylor Schilling Constance Shulman Dale Soules Yael Stone Samira Wiley | Won | |
| Screen Actors Guild Awards | 2016 | Outstanding Performance by a Female Actor in a Comedy Series | Uzo Aduba | Won | |
| Screen Actors Guild Awards | 2017 | Outstanding Performance by an Ensemble in a Comedy Series | Ensemble: Uzo Aduba Alan Aisenberg Danielle Brooks Blair Brown Jackie Cruz Lea DeLaria Beth Dover Kimiko Glenn Annie Golden Laura Gómez Diane Guerrero Michael J. Harney Brad William Henke Vicky Jeudy Julie Lake Selenis Leyva Natasha Lyonne Taryn Manning James McMenamin Adrienne C. Moore Kate Mulgrew Emma Myles Matt Peters Lori Petty Jessica Pimentel Dascha Polanco Laura Prepon Jolene Purdy Elizabeth Rodriguez Nick Sandow Abigail Savage Taylor Schilling Constance Shulman Dale Soules Yael Stone Lin Tucci Samira Wiley | Won | |
| Screen Actors Guild Awards | 2017 | Outstanding Performance by a Female Actor in a Comedy Series | Uzo Aduba | Nominated | |
| Screen Actors Guild Awards | 2018 | Outstanding Performance by an Ensemble in a Comedy Series | Ensemble: Uzo Aduba Emily Althaus Danielle Brooks Rosal Colon Jackie Cruz Francesca Curran Daniella De Jesus Lea DeLaria Nick Dillenburg Asia Kate Dillon Beth Dover Kimiko Glenn Annie Golden Laura Gómez Diane Guerrero Evan Arthur Hall Michael J. Harney Brad William Henke Mike Houston Vicky Jeudy Kelly Karbacz Julie Lake Selenis Leyva Natasha Lyonne Taryn Manning Adrienne C. Moore Miriam Morales Kate Mulgrew Emma Myles John Palladino Matt Peters Jessica Pimentel Dascha Polanco Laura Prepon Jolene Purdy Elizabeth Rodriguez Nick Sandow Abigail Savage Taylor Schilling Constance Shulman Dale Soules Yael Stone Emily Tarver Michael Torpey Lin Tucci | Nominated | |
| Screen Actors Guild Awards | 2018 | Outstanding Performance by a Female Actor in a Comedy Series | Uzo Aduba | Nominated | |
| Screenwriters Choice Awards | 2014 | Best Television Comedy | Jenji Kohan | Nominated | |
| Screenwriters Choice Awards | 2015 | Best Television Comedy | Jenji Kohan | Nominated | |
| TCA Awards | 2014 | Program of the Year | Orange Is the New Black | Nominated | |
| TCA Awards | 2014 | Outstanding New Program | Orange Is the New Black | Won | |
| Writers Guild of America Awards | 2013 | Television: Comedy Series | Writers: Liz Friedman, Sian Heder, Tara Herrmann, Sara Hess, Nick Jones, Jenji Kohan, Gary Lennon, Lauren Morelli, Marco Ramirez | Nominated | |
| Writers Guild of America Awards | 2013 | Television: New Series | Writers: Liz Friedman, Sian Heder, Tara Herrmann, Sara Hess, Nick Jones, Jenji Kohan, Gary Lennon, Lauren Morelli, Marco Ramirez | Nominated | |
| Writers Guild of America Awards | 2013 | Television: Episodic Comedy | Liz Friedman and Jenji Kohan (for "I Wasn't Ready") | Nominated | |
| Writers Guild of America Awards | 2013 | Television: Episodic Comedy | Sian Heder (for "Lesbian Request Denied") | Nominated | |
| Writers Guild of America Awards | 2014 | Television: Comedy Series | Writers: Stephen Falk, Sian Heder, Tara Herrmann, Sara Hess, Nick Jones, Jenji Kohan, Lauren Morelli, Alex Regnery, Hartley Voss | Nominated | |
| Writers Guild of America Awards | 2014 | Television: Episodic Comedy | Nick Jones (for "Low Self Esteem City") | Nominated | |
| Writers Guild of America Awards | 2019 | Television: Episodic Comedy | Jenji Kohan (for "Here's Where We Get Off") | Nominated | |

== Critics' top ten lists ==
2013
- 1st – Boob Tube Dude
- 1st – The Daily Beast
- 2nd – Boston Globe
- 2nd – Film School Rejects
- 2nd – HitFix
- 2nd – Indiewire
- 2nd – Los Angeles Times
- 2nd – San Francisco Chronicle
- 2nd – Washington Post
- 3rd – PopMatters
- 3rd – Slate
- 3rd – Time
- 4th – Complex
- 4th – Entertainment Weekly (Melissa Maerz)
- 4th – Paste
- 5th – Grantland
- 5th – Lincoln Journal Star
- 6th – Entertainment Weekly (Jeff Jensen)
- 6th – New York Vulture
- 6th – Philadelphia Daily News
- 6th – Pittsburgh Post-Gazette
- 8th – Austin Chronicle
- 8th – Filmmaker Magazine
- 8th – Houston Chronicle
- 8th – The Oregonian
- 9th – NPR
- 10th – NPR Fresh Air
- – Huffington Post
- – IGN
- – RedEye Chicago

2014
- 2nd – The Star-Ledger
- 3rd – Akron Beacon Journal
- 3rd – HitFix (Dan Fienberg)
- 3rd – Indiewire'
- 3rd – Las Vegas Weekly
- 3rd – Pittsburgh Post-Gazette
- 3rd – Tampa Bay Times
- 3rd – Village Voice
- 4th – Paste
- 4th – PopMatters
- 4th – Time
- 4th – Us Weekly
- 5th – Denver Post
- 5th – Uncle Barky
- 6th – The Daily Beast
- 6th – HitFix (Alan Sepinwall)
- 6th – NPR
- 6th – Sioux City Journal
- 7th – The Hollywood Reporter
- 7th – San Jose Mercury News
- 7th – Vox
- 8th – Slate
- 8th – Thompson on Hollywood!
- 9th – Digital Spy
- 10th – Washington Post
- – Huffington Post
- – Philadelphia Daily News
- – ScreenCrush

2015
- 8th – Philadelphia Daily News
- 8th – Village Voice
- – The Atlantic
- – The Week
