= List of awards and nominations received by House of Cards =

List of awards won by House of Cards
Award	Won	Nom
Primetime Emmy	7	56
Golden Globes	2	8
Screen Actors Guild	2	11
Satellite	1	8
Critics' Choice	0	8
Total number of wins and nominations
6 seasons	27	223

House of Cards is an American political drama web television series created by Beau Willimon. It is an adaptation of the BBC's mini-series of the same name and is based on the novel by Michael Dobbs. All seasons have premiered on the streaming service Netflix.

In 2013, House of Cards became the first original online-only web television series to receive major nominations at the Primetime Emmy Awards. The first episode, "Chapter 1", received four nominations becoming the first webisode (online-only episode) of a television series to receive a major Primetime Emmy Award nomination. Eigil Bryld won the Primetime Emmy Award for Outstanding Cinematography for a Single-Camera Series and David Fincher won for Outstanding Directing for a Drama Series for the episode "Chapter 1", making it the first Emmy-awarded webisode. The series was nominated for the Primetime Emmy Award for Outstanding Drama Series five times. The first two seasons of House of Cards were nominated for the Golden Globe Award for Best Television Series – Drama.

For her work in House of Cards, Robin Wright won a Golden Globe and Satellite Award. She was Netflix's first awarded person in major acting categories. Wright's Golden Globe Award for Best Actress – Television Series Drama for her portrayal of Claire Underwood made her the first actress to win a Golden Globe Award for an online-only web television series. She also earned an Outstanding Lead Actress in a Drama Series nomination at the 65th, 66th, 67th, 68th, 69th, and 71st Primetime Emmy Awards. In the role of Frank Underwood and as producer of House of Cards, Kevin Spacey was nominated for Golden Globes at the 2014 and 2015 ceremonies. In 2015, Spacey won the Golden Globe Award for Best Actor – Television Series Drama. He was nominated for a Primetime Emmy Award for Outstanding Lead Actor in a Drama Series five times. Later that year, Spacey won the Screen Actors Guild Award for Outstanding Performance by a Male Actor in a Drama Series.

== Honorary awards ==
Year	Award	Category	Result	Ref.
2013	Peabody Award	Area of Excellence	Won	
2013	American Film Institute	Top 10 Television Programs	Won	

== Major associations ==
=== British Academy Television Awards ===
British Academy Television Awards
Year	Category	Recipients	Result	Ref.
2014	Best International Programme	Producers: Beau Willimon David Fincher Joshua Donen Kevin Spacey	Nominated	
2015	Best International Programme	Producers: Beau Willimon David Fincher Joshua Donen Kevin Spacey	Nominated	

=== Golden Globe Awards ===
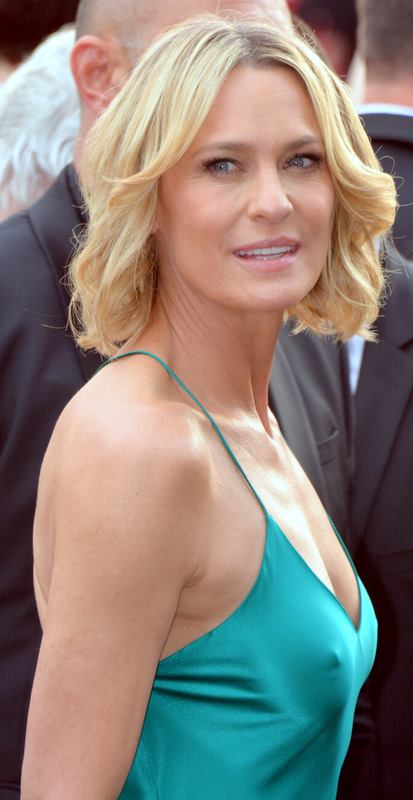
Robin Wright.

Golden Globe Awards
Year	Category	Recipients	Result	Ref.
2014	Best Television Series – Drama		Nominated	
2014	Best Actor – Television Series Drama	Kevin Spacey	Nominated	
2014	Best Actress – Television Series Drama	Robin Wright	Won	
2014	Best Supporting Actor – Series, Miniseries or Television Film	Corey Stoll	Nominated	
2015	Best Television Series – Drama		Nominated	
2015	Best Actor – Television Series Drama	Kevin Spacey	Won	
2015	Best Actress – Television Series Drama	Robin Wright	Nominated	
2016	Best Actress – Television Series Drama	Robin Wright	Nominated	

=== Irish Film & Television Academy Awards ===
Irish Film & Television Academy Awards
Year	Category	Recipients	Result	Ref.
2017	Best Actress in a Supporting Role in Drama	Dominique McElligott	Nominated	

=== Primetime Emmy Awards ===
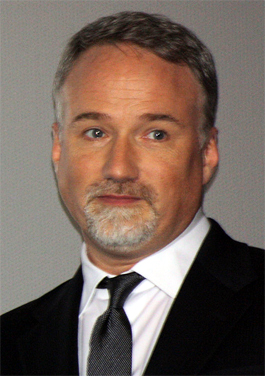
David Fincher.

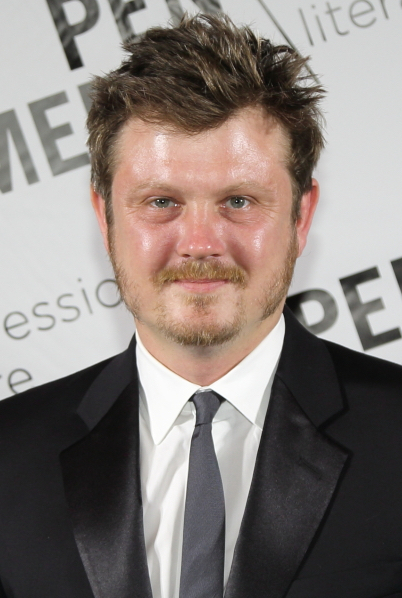
Beau Willimon.

Primetime Emmy Awards
Year	Category	Recipients	Episode	Result	Ref.
2013	Outstanding Drama Series	Producers: David Fincher; Joshua Donen; Eric Roth; Beau Willimon; John Melfi; Kevin Spacey; Dana Brunetti; Michael Dobbs; Andrew Davies; Sarah Treem; Keith Huff; Karyn McCarthy		Nominated	
2013	Outstanding Lead Actor in a Drama Series	Kevin Spacey	"Chapter 1"	Nominated	
2013	Outstanding Lead Actress in a Drama Series	Robin Wright	"Chapter 10"	Nominated	
2013	Outstanding Directing for a Drama Series	David Fincher	"Chapter 1"	Won	
2014	Outstanding Drama Series	Producers: Beau Willimon; Joshua Donen; Eric Roth; David Fincher; Kevin Spacey; Dana Brunetti; Andrew Davies; Michael Dobbs; David Manson; John Mankiewicz; Robert Zotnowski; Iain Paterson		Nominated	
2014	Outstanding Lead Actor in a Drama Series	Kevin Spacey	"Chapter 26"	Nominated	
2014	Outstanding Lead Actress in a Drama Series	Robin Wright	"Chapter 26"	Nominated	
2014	Outstanding Directing for a Drama Series	Carl Franklin	"Chapter 14"	Nominated	
2014	Outstanding Writing for a Drama Series	Beau Willimon	"Chapter 14"	Nominated	
2015	Outstanding Drama Series	Producers: Beau Willimon; Joshua Donen; Eric Roth; David Fincher; Kevin Spacey; Dana Brunetti; Andrew Davies; Michael Dobbs; John David Coles; John Mankiewicz; Robert Zotnowski; Jay Carson; Karen Moore		Nominated	
2015	Outstanding Lead Actor in a Drama Series	Kevin Spacey	"Chapter 32"	Nominated	
2015	Outstanding Lead Actress in a Drama Series	Robin Wright	"Chapter 32"	Nominated	
2015	Outstanding Supporting Actor for a Drama Series	Michael Kelly	"Chapter 27"	Nominated	
2016	Outstanding Drama Series	Producers: Beau Willimon; Andrew Davies; Michael Dobbs; Robin Wright, Kevin Spacey; Dana Brunetti; Josh Donen; Eric Roth; David Fincher; John Mankiewicz; Robert Zotnowski; Jay Carson; Frank Pugliese; Hameed Shaukat; Boris Malden		Nominated	
2016	Outstanding Lead Actor in a Drama Series	Kevin Spacey	"Chapter 52"	Nominated	
2016	Outstanding Lead Actress in a Drama Series	Robin Wright	"Chapter 49"	Nominated	
2016	Outstanding Supporting Actor for a Drama Series	Michael Kelly	"Chapter 44"	Nominated	
2017	Outstanding Drama Series	Producers: Melissa James Gibson; Frank Pugliese Andrew Davies; Michael Dobbs; Robin Wright; Kevin Spacey; Dana Brunetti; Josh Donen; Eric Roth; David Fincher; Daniel Minahan; John Mankiewicz; Robert Zotnowski; Kenneth Lin; Hameed Shaukat; Laura Eason; Bill Kennedy; Boris Malden		Nominated	
2017	Outstanding Lead Actor in a Drama Series	Kevin Spacey	"Chapter 53"	Nominated	
2017	Outstanding Lead Actress in a Drama Series	Robin Wright	"Chapter 65"	Nominated	
2017	Outstanding Supporting Actor for a Drama Series	Michael Kelly	"Chapter 64"	Nominated	
2019
2019	Outstanding Lead Actress in a Drama Series	Robin Wright		Nominated	
2019	Outstanding Supporting Actor for a Drama Series	Michael Kelly		Nominated	

==== Primetime Creative Arts Emmy Awards ====
Primetime Creative Arts Emmy Awards
Year	Category	Recipients	Episode	Result	Ref.
2013	Outstanding Casting for a Drama Series	Laray Mayfield and Julie Schubert		Won	
2013	Outstanding Cinematography for a Single-Camera Series	Eigil Bryld	"Chapter 1"	Won	
2013	Outstanding Single-Camera Picture Editing for a Drama Series	Kirk Baxter	"Chapter 1"	Nominated	
2013	Outstanding Music Composition for a Series	Jeff Beal	"Chapter 1"	Nominated	
2013	Outstanding Original Main Title Theme Music	Jeff Beal		Nominated	
2014	Outstanding Guest Actor in a Drama Series	Reg E. Cathey	"Chapter 22"	Nominated	
2014	Outstanding Guest Actress in a Drama Series	Kate Mara	"Chapter 14"	Nominated	
2014	Outstanding Casting for a Drama Series	Mayfield, Schubert		Nominated	
2014	Outstanding Cinematography for a Single-Camera Series	Igor Martinovic	"Chapter 18"	Nominated	
2014	Outstanding Single-Camera Picture Editing for a Drama Series	Byron Smith	"Chapter 14"	Nominated	
2014	Outstanding Music Composition for a Series	Jeff Beal	"Chapter 26"	Nominated	
2014	Outstanding Sound Mixing for a Comedy or Drama Series	Millan, Nance, Lewis	"Chapter 14"	Won	
2014	Outstanding Production Design for a Contemporary or Fantasy Program	Arnold, Gebarowicz, Zappulla	"Chapter 18, 24"	Nominated	
2015	Outstanding Guest Actor in a Drama Series	Reg E. Cathey	"Chapter 34"	Won	
2015	Outstanding Guest Actress in a Drama Series	Rachel Brosnahan	"Chapter 39"	Nominated	
2015	Outstanding Casting for a Drama Series	Mayfield, Schubert		Nominated	
2015	Outstanding Cinematography for a Single-Camera Series	Martin Ahlgren	"Chapter 29"	Nominated	
2015	Outstanding Music Composition for a Series	Jeff Beal	"Chapter 32"	Won	
2015	Outstanding Sound Mixing for a Comedy or Drama Series	Millan, Nance, Lewis	"Chapter 27"	Nominated	
2015	Outstanding Production Design for a Contemporary or Fantasy Program	Arnold, Gebarowicz, Zappulla	"Chapter 29, 36"	Nominated	
2016	Outstanding Guest Actor in a Drama Series	Mahershala Ali	"Chapter 44"	Nominated	
2016	Outstanding Guest Actor in a Drama Series	Reg E. Cathey	"Chapter 50"	Nominated	
2016	Outstanding Guest Actor in a Drama Series	Paul Sparks	"Chapter 49"	Nominated	
2016	Outstanding Guest Actress in a Drama Series	Ellen Burstyn	"Chapter 41"	Nominated	
2016	Outstanding Guest Actress in a Drama Series	Molly Parker	"Chapter 45"	Nominated	
2016	Outstanding Casting for a Drama Series	Mayfield, Schubert		Nominated	
2016	Outstanding Cinematography for a Single-Camera Series	David M. Dunlap	"Chapter 45"	Nominated	
2016	Outstanding Sound Mixing for a Comedy or Drama Series	Millan, Nance, Lewis	"Chapter 52"	Nominated	
2016	Outstanding Production Design for a Contemporary or Fantasy Program	Arnold, Gebarowicz, Zappulla	"Chapter 41, 47, 48"	Nominated	
2017	Outstanding Music Composition for a Series	Jeff Beal	"Chapter 63"	Won	
2017	Outstanding Sound Mixing for a Comedy or Drama Series	Millan, Nance, Lewis	"Chapter 53"	Nominated	
2017	Outstanding Costumes for a Contemporary Series, Limited Series, or Movie	Argan, Harris, Wenger, Bernstein-Pratt	"Chapter 61"	Nominated	
2019	Outstanding Music Composition for a Series	Jeff Beal	"Chapter 73"	Nominated	

== Guilds ==
=== Art Directors Guild Awards ===
Art Directors Guild Awards
Year	Category	Recipients	Episode	Result	Ref.
2014	One-Hour Contemporary Single-Camera Series	Steve Arnold	"Chapter 18	Nominated	
2015	One-Hour Contemporary Single-Camera Series	Steve Arnold	"Chapter 29, 36"	Won	
2016	One-Hour Contemporary Single-Camera Series	Steve Arnold	"Chapter 41, 47, 48"	Nominated	

=== Directors Guild of America Awards ===
Directors Guild of America Awards
Year	Category	Recipients	Episode	Result	Ref.
2013	Outstanding Directing – Drama Series	David Fincher	"Chapter 1"	Nominated	
2014	Outstanding Directing – Drama Series	Jodie Foster	"Chapter 22"	Nominated	

=== Location Managers Guild Awards ===
Location Managers Guild Awards
Year	Category	Recipients	Result	Ref.
2014	Outstanding Achievement in Television	Christian Diaz de Bedoya	Nominated	
2014	Outstanding Locations in Television		Nominated	

=== Make-Up Artists and Hair Stylists Guild Awards ===
Make-Up Artists and Hair Stylists Guild Awards
Year	Category	Recipients	Result	Ref.
2015	Best Contemporary Makeup - Television and New Media Series	Tricia Sawyer, Vasilios Tanis	Nominated	
2015	Best Contemporary Hair Styling - Television and New Media Series	Sean Flanigan, Shunika Terry	Nominated	
2016	Best Contemporary Makeup - Television and New Media Series	Tricia Sawyer, Vasilios Tanis	Nominated	
2016	Best Contemporary Hair Styling - Television and New Media Series	Sean Flanigan, Michael Ward	Nominated	

=== Producers Guild of America Awards ===
Producers Guild of America Awards
Year	Category	Recipients	Result	Ref.
2013	Best Episodic Drama	Producers: Joshua Donen, David Fincher, Karyn McCarthy, John Melfi, Eric Roth, Kevin Spacey, Beau Willimon	Nominated	
2014	Best Episodic Drama	Producers: Dana Brunetti, Joshua Donen, David Fincher, David Manson, Iain Paterson, Eric Roth, Kevin Spacey, Beau Willimon	Nominated	
2015	Best Episodic Drama	Producers: Beau Willimon, Dana Brunetti, John David Coles, Josh Donen, David Fincher, Eric Roth, Kevin Spacey, Robert Zotnowski, Karen Moore	Nominated	
2016	Best Episodic Drama	Producers: Beau Willimon, Dana Brunetti, Michael Dobbs, Josh Donen, David Fincher, Eric Roth, Kevin Spacey, Robin Wright, John Mankiewicz, Robert Zotnowski, Jay Carson, Frank Pugliese, Boris Malden	Nominated	

=== Screen Actors Guild Awards ===
Screen Actors Guild Awards
Year	Category	Recipients	Result	Ref.
2014	Outstanding Performance by a Male Actor in a Drama Series	Kevin Spacey	Nominated	
2015	Outstanding Performance by a Male Actor in a Drama Series	Kevin Spacey	Won	
2015	Outstanding Performance by a Female Actor in a Drama Series	Robin Wright	Nominated	
2015	Outstanding Performance by an Ensemble in a Drama Series		Nominated	
2016	Outstanding Performance by a Male Actor in a Drama Series	Kevin Spacey	Won	
2016	Outstanding Performance by a Female Actor in a Drama Series	Robin Wright	Nominated	
2016	Outstanding Performance by an Ensemble in a Drama Series		Nominated	
2017	Outstanding Performance by a Male Actor in a Drama Series	Kevin Spacey	Nominated	
2017	Outstanding Performance by a Female Actor in a Drama Series	Robin Wright	Nominated	
2018	Outstanding Performance by a Female Actor in a Drama Series	Robin Wright	Nominated	
2019	Outstanding Performance by a Female Actor in a Drama Series	Robin Wright	Nominated	

=== Writers Guild of America Awards ===
Writers Guild of America Awards
Year	Category	Recipients	Episode	Result	Ref.
2013	Television: Dramatic Series	Writers: Kate Barnow, Rick Cleveland, Sam R. Forman, Gina Gionfriddo, Keith Huff, Sarah Treemm, Beau Willimon		Nominated	
2013	Television: New Series	Writers: Kate Barnow, Rick Cleveland, Sam R. Forman, Gina Gionfriddo, Keith Huff, Sarah Treemm, Beau Willimon		Won	
2013	Television: Episodic Drama	Beau Willimon	"Chapter 1"	Nominated	
2014	Television: Dramatic Series	Writers: Kate Barnow, Rick Cleveland, Sam R. Forman, Gina Gionfriddo, Keith Huff, Sarah Treemm, Beau Willimon		Nominated	

== Popular awards ==
=== EWwy Awards ===
EWwy Awards
Year	Category	Recipients	Result	Ref.
2013	Best Supporting Actor, Drama	Corey Stoll	Nominated	

=== IGN Awards ===
IGN Awards
Year	Category	Recipients	Result	Ref.
2013	Best TV Actor	Kevin Spacey	Nominated	
2013	Best TV Actress	Robin Wright	Nominated	
2013	People's Choice: Best TV Actress	Robin Wright	Won	
2014	Best TV Actress	Robin Wright	Nominated	

=== NewNowNext Awards ===
NewNowNext Awards
Year	Category	Recipients	Result	Ref.
2013	TV You Betta Watch		Nominated	
2013	Cause You're Hot	Mahershala Ali	Nominated	
2013	Best New Do	Robin Wright	Nominated	
2014	Best New Television Actress	Molly Parker	Nominated	

=== Online Film and Television Association Awards ===
Online Film and Television Association Awards
Year	Category	Recipients	Result	Ref.
2013	Best Actor in a Drama Series	Kevin Spacey	Nominated	
2013	Best Actress in a Drama Series	Robin Wright	Nominated	
2013	Best Ensemble Drama Series		Nominated	
2013	Best Direction in a Drama Series		Nominated	
2013	Best Editing in a Series	Baxter, Smith	Nominated	
2013	Best New Theme Song in a Series	Jeff Beal	Nominated	
2013	Best New Titles Sequence		Nominated	
2014	Best Drama Series		Nominated	
2014	Best Actress in a Drama Series	Robin Wright	Nominated	
2014	Best Guest Actress in a Drama Series	Kate Mara	Nominated	
2014	Best Ensamble Drama Series		Nominated	
2014	Best Writing in a Drama Series		Nominated	
2014	Best Music in a Series	Jeff Beal	Nominated	
2014	Best Cinematography in a Series	Martinovic, Dunlap	Nominated	
2014	Best Editing in a Series	Baxter, Smith	Nominated	
2015	Best Drama Series		Nominated	
2015	Best Actor in a Drama Series	Kevin Spacey	Nominated	
2015	Best Actress in a Drama Series	Robin Wright	Nominated	
2015	Best Guest Actress in a Drama Series	Rachel Brosnahan	Nominated	
2015	Best Ensemble Drama Series		Nominated	
2015	Best Writing in a Drama Series		Nominated	
2015	Best Music in a Series	Jeff Beal	Nominated	
2015	Best Editing in a Series	Baxter, Smith	Nominated	
2016	Best Drama Series		Nominated	
2016	Best Actor in a Drama Series	Kevin Spacey	Nominated	
2016	Best Actress in a Drama Series	Robin Wright	Nominated	
2016	Best Supporting Actor in a Drama Series	Michael Kelly	Nominated	
2016	Best Guest Actor in a Drama Series	Reg E. Cathey	Nominated	
2016	Best Guest Actor in a Drama Series	Mahershala Ali	Nominated	
2016	Best Guest Actress in a Drama Series	Molly Parker	Nominated	
2016	Best Guest Actress in a Drama Series	Ellen Burstyn	Won	
2016	Best Ensemble Drama Series		Nominated	
2016	Best Direction in a Drama Series		Nominated	
2016	Best Writing in a Drama Series		Nominated	
2016	Best Music in a Series	Jeff Beal	Nominated	
2016	Best Cinematography in a Series	Martinovic, Dunlap	Nominated	
2016	Best Editing in a Series	Baxter, Smith	Nominated	
2017	Best Actress in a Drama Series	Robin Wright	Nominated	

=== People's Choice Awards ===
People's Choice Awards
Year	Category	Recipients	Result	Ref.
2014	Favorite Streaming Series		Nominated	
2016	Favorite Streaming Series		Nominated	
2017	Favorite Premium Drama Series		Nominated	
2017	Favorite Premium Series Actor	Kevin Spacey	Nominated	

== Other associations ==
=== American Cinema Editors Awards ===
American Cinema Editors
Year	Category	Recipients	Episode	Result	Ref.
2014	Best Edited One Hour Series for Non-Commercial Television	Kirk Baxter	"Chapter 1"	Nominated	
2015	Best Edited One Hour Series for Non-Commercial Television	Byron Smith	"Chapter 14"	Nominated	
2016	Best Edited One Hour Series for Non-Commercial Television	Lisa Bromwell	"Chapter 39"	Won	

=== American Society of Cinematographers Awards ===
American Society of Cinematographers Awards
Year	Category	Recipients	Episode	Result	Ref.
2017	Cinematography in Regular Series for Non-Commercial Television	David M. Dunlap	"Chapter 45"	Nominated	

=== Artios Awards ===
Artios Awards
Year	Category	Recipients	Result	Ref.
2014	Achievement in Casting – Television Series Drama	Laray Mayfield, Julie Schubert	Nominated	
2014	Achievement in Casting – Television Pilot Drama	Laray Mayfield	Won	
2015	Achievement in Casting – Television Series Drama	Laray Mayfield, Julie Schubert	Nominated	
2016	Achievement in Casting – Television Series Drama	Laray Mayfield, Julie Schubert	Nominated	
2017	Achievement in Casting – Television Series Drama	Laray Mayfield, Julie Schubert	Nominated	

=== Cinema Audio Society Awards ===
Cinema Audio Society Awards
Year	Category	Recipients	Season	Result	Ref.
2016	Outstanding Achievement in Sound Mixing – Television Series	Nominees: Lorenzo Millan Nathan Nance Scott R. Lewis Corey Tyler	"Chapter 27"	Nominated	

=== Critics' Choice Television Awards ===
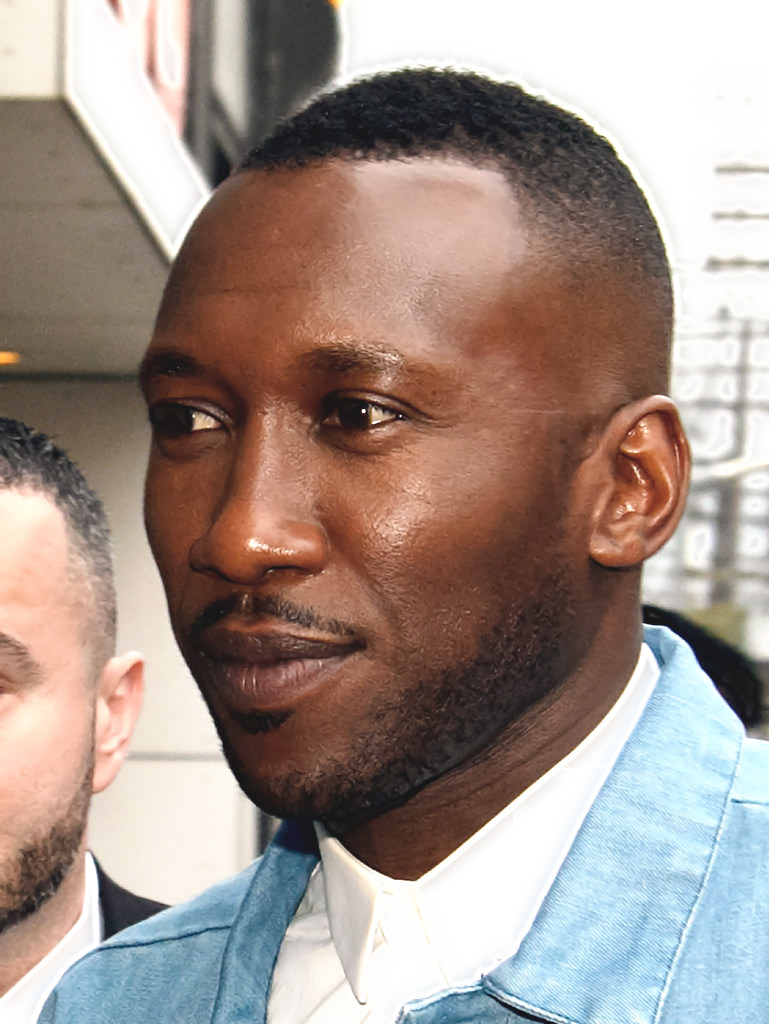
Mahershala Ali.

Critics' Choice Television Awards
Year	Category	Recipients	Result	Ref.
2013	Best Actor in a Drama Series	Kevin Spacey	Nominated	
2013	Best Supporting Actor in a Drama Series	Corey Stoll	Nominated	
2014	Best Actress in a Drama Series	Robin Wright	Nominated	
2016	Best Actor in a Drama Series	Kevin Spacey	Nominated	
2016	Best Actress in a Drama Series	Robin Wright	Nominated	
2016	Best Guest Performer in a Drama Series	Mahershala Ali	Nominated	
2016	Best Guest Performer in a Drama Series	Ellen Burstyn	Nominated	
2018	Best Actress in a Drama Series	Robin Wright	Nominated	

=== Costume Designers Guild Awards ===
Costume Designers Guild Awards
Year	Category	Recipients	Result	Ref.
2013	Excellence in Costume Design for a Contemporary Television Series	Tom Broecker	Won	
2014	Excellence in Costume Design for a Contemporary Television Series	Johanna Argan	Nominated	
2015	Excellence in Costume Design for a Contemporary Television Series	Johanna Argan, Kemal Harris	Nominated	
2016	Excellence in Costume Design for a Contemporary Television Series	Johanna Argan, Kemal Harris	Nominated	

=== Golden Reel Awards ===
Motion Picture Sound Editors
Year	Category	Recipients	Episode	Result	Ref.
2015	Best TV Short Form Music Score	Nominees: Jonathon Stevens Marie Ebbing	"Chapter 14"	Nominated	
2016	Best Sound Editing Television — Short Form	Jonathon Stevens	"Chapter 33"	Won	

=== Golden Camera Awards ===
Motion Picture Sound Editors
Year	Category	Recipients	Result	Ref.
2015	Best International Actor	Kevin Spacey	Won	

=== Hollywood Music in Media Awards ===
Hollywood Music in Media Awards
Year	Category	Recipients	Result	Ref.
2015	Original Score – TV Show/Digital Series	Jeff Beal	Won	

=== Hollywood Post Alliance Awards ===
Hollywood Post Alliance Awards
Year	Category	Recipients	Episode	Result	Ref.
2014	Outstanding Visual Effects - Television	Nominees: James Pastorius Andy Witkowski Rusty Ippolito Andrew Roberts	"Chapter 19"	Nominated	
2014	Outstanding Editing - Television	Cindy Mollo	"Chapter 26"	Nominated	
2014	Outstanding Editing - Television	Byron Smith	"Chapter 14"	Nominated	
2014	Outstanding Sound - Television	Nominees: Jeremy Molod Ren Klyce Nathan Nance Scott R. Lewis Jonathon Stevens	"Chapter 14"	Nominated	
2015	Outstanding Editing - Television	Cindy Mollo	"Chapter 32"	Nominated	
2016	Outstanding Sound - Television	Nominees: Jeremy Molod Ren Klyce Nathan Nance Scott R. Lewis Jonathon Stevens	"Chapter 45"	Nominated	

=== NAACP Image Awards ===
NAACP Image Awards
Year	Category	Recipients	Episode	Result	Ref.
2014	Outstanding Directing in a Drama Series	Carl Franklin	"Chapter 11"	Nominated	
2015	Outstanding Drama Series			Nominated	
2015	Outstanding Directing in a Drama Series	Carl Franklin	"Chapter 14"	Won	

=== Satellite Awards ===
Satellite Awards
Year	Category	Recipients	Result	Ref.
2014	Best Television Series – Drama		Nominated	
2014	Best Actor – Television Series Drama	Kevin Spacey	Nominated	
2014	Best Actress – Television Series Drama	Robin Wright	Won	
2014	Best Supporting Actor – Series, Miniseries or Television Film	Corey Stoll	Nominated	
2015	Best Television Series – Drama		Nominated	
2015	Best Actress – Television Series Drama	Robin Wright	Nominated	
2016	Best Actress – Television Series Drama	Robin Wright	Nominated	
2017	Best Supporting Actor – Series, Miniseries or Television Film	Michael Kelly	Nominated	

=== Screenwriters Choice Awards ===
Screenwriters Choice Awards
Year	Category	Recipients	Result	Ref.
2013	Best Television Drama	Beau Willimon	Nominated	
2014	Best Television Drama	Beau Willimon	Nominated	

=== Television Critics Association Awards ===
TCA Awards
Year	Category	Recipients	Result	Ref.
2013	Program of the Year		Nominated	
2013	Outstanding New Program		Nominated	
2014	Outstanding Achievement in Drama		Nominated	

== Awards and nominations for the cast ==
Primetime Emmy Awards
Actor	Character	Category	Seasons				
Actor	Character	Category	1	2	3	4	5
Kevin Spacey	Frank Underwood	Lead Actor	Nominated	Nominated	Nominated	Nominated	Nominated
Robin Wright	Claire Underwood	Lead Actress	Nominated	Nominated	Nominated	Nominated	Nominated
Reg E. Cathey	Freddy Hayes	Guest Actor		Nominated	Won	Nominated	
Kate Mara	Zoe Barnes	Guest Actress		Nominated			
Michael Kelly	Douglas Stamper	Supporting Actor			Nominated	Nominated	Nominated
Rachel Brosnahan	Rachel Posner	Guest Actress			Nominated		
Mahershala Ali	Remy Danton	Guest Actor				Nominated	
Paul Sparks	Thomas Yates	Guest Actor				Nominated	
Ellen Burstyn	Elizabeth Hale	Guest Actress				Nominated	
Molly Parker	Jacqueline Sharp	Guest Actress				Nominated	

Golden Globe Awards
Actor	Character	Category	Seasons				
Actor	Character	Category	1	2	3	4	5
Kevin Spacey	Frank Underwood	Best Actor	Nominated	Won			
Robin Wright	Claire Underwood	Best Actress	Won	Nominated	Nominated		
Corey Stoll	Peter Russo	Supporting Actor	Nominated				

Critics' Choice Television Awards
Actor	Character	Category	Seasons				
Actor	Character	Category	1	2	3	4	5
Kevin Spacey	Frank Underwood	Best Actor	Nominated			Nominated	
Corey Stoll	Peter Russo	Supporting Actor	Nominated				
Robin Wright	Claire Underwood	Best Actress		Nominated		Nominated	Nominated
Mahershala Ali	Remy Danton	Guest Performer				Nominated	
Ellen Burstyn	Elizabeth Hale	Guest Performer				Nominated	
