= Satellite Award for Best Television Series – Musical or Comedy =

Annual television award

- Awarded for: Best Television Series – Musical or Comedy
- Country: United States
- Presented by: International Press Academy
- First award: 1996
- Currently held by: Platonic (2025)

The Satellite Award for Best Television Series – Musical or Comedy is an annual award given by the International Press Academy as one of its Satellite Awards.

== Winners and nominees ==
=== 1990s ===
Year	Winners and nominees	Network
1996	The Larry Sanders Show	HBO
1996	3rd Rock from the Sun	NBC
1996	Cybill	CBS
1996	Seinfeld	NBC
1996	Spin City	ABC
1997	Frasier	NBC
1997	The Drew Carey Show	ABC
1997	The Larry Sanders Show	HBO
1997	Mad About You	NBC
1997	Spin City	ABC
1998	Ellen	ABC
1998	3rd Rock from the Sun	NBC
1998	Frasier	NBC
1998	Mad About You	NBC
1998	Suddenly Susan	NBC
1999	Action	Fox
1999	Becker	CBS
1999	Dharma & Greg	ABC
1999	Frasier	NBC
1999	Sex and the City	HBO

=== 2000s ===
Year	Winners and nominees	Network
2000	Sex and the City	HBO
2000	Frasier	NBC
2000	Friends	NBC
2000	Just Shoot Me!	NBC
2000	The Simpsons	Fox
2001	Sex and the City	HBO
2001	Dharma & Greg	ABC
2001	Everybody Loves Raymond	CBS
2001	Frasier	NBC
2001	Friends	NBC
2002	The Bernie Mac Show	Fox
2002	Curb Your Enthusiasm	HBO
2002	Friends	NBC
2002	Gilmore Girls	The WB
2002	Scrubs	NBC
2003	Arrested Development	Fox
2003	The Bernie Mac Show	Fox
2003	Curb Your Enthusiasm	HBO
2003	Da Ali G Show	HBO
2003	Kid Notorious	Comedy Central
2003	Sex and the City	HBO
2004	Desperate Housewives	ABC
2004	Arrested Development	Fox
2004	The Bernie Mac Show	Fox
2004	Gilmore Girls	The WB
2004	Scrubs	NBC
2005	The Daily Show with Jon Stewart	Comedy Central
2005	Boston Legal	ABC
2005	The Colbert Report	Comedy Central
2005	Entourage	HBO
2005	My Name Is Earl	NBC
2006	Ugly Betty	ABC
2006	The Colbert Report	Comedy Central
2006	Entourage	HBO
2006	Everybody Hates Chris	The CW
2006	The Office	NBC
2007	Pushing Daisies	ABC
2007	Chuck	NBC
2007	Extras	HBO
2007	Flight of the Conchords	HBO
2007	Ugly Betty	ABC
2007	Weeds	Showtime
2008	Tracey Ullman's State of the Union	Showtime
2008	30 Rock	NBC
2008	The Colbert Report	Comedy Central
2008	It's Always Sunny in Philadelphia	FX
2008	Pushing Daisies	ABC
2008	Skins	E4
2009	Glee	Fox
2009	30 Rock	NBC
2009	The Big Bang Theory	CBS
2009	Flight of the Conchords	HBO
2009	How I Met Your Mother	CBS
2009	Weeds	Showtime

=== 2010s ===
Year	Winners and nominees	Network(s)
2010	The Big C	Showtime
2010	30 Rock	NBC
2010	Glee	Fox
2010	Modern Family	ABC
2010	Nurse Jackie	Showtime
2010	Raising Hope	Fox
2010	United States of Tara	Showtime
2011	It's Always Sunny in Philadelphia	FX
2011	The Big C	Showtime
2011	Community	NBC
2011	Episodes	BBC Two / Showtime
2011	Louie	FX
2011	Modern Family	ABC
2012	The Big Bang Theory	CBS
2012	Community	NBC
2012	Girls	HBO
2012	Happy Endings	ABC
2012	Modern Family	ABC
2012	The Office	NBC
2012	Parks and Recreation	NBC
2012	Up All Night	NBC
2013	Orange Is the New Black	Netflix
2013	Alpha House	Amazon Prime Video
2013	The Big Bang Theory	CBS
2013	Brooklyn Nine-Nine	Fox
2013	Enlightened	HBO
2013	Modern Family	ABC
2013	The Wrong Mans	BBC Two / Hulu
2013	A Young Doctor's Notebook	Sky Arts
2014	Transparent	Amazon Prime Video
2014	Alpha House	Amazon Prime Video
2014	The Big Bang Theory	CBS
2014	Brooklyn Nine-Nine	Fox
2014	Louie	FX
2014	Orange Is the New Black	Netflix
2014	Silicon Valley	HBO
2014	Veep	HBO
2015	Silicon Valley	HBO
2015	Brooklyn Nine-Nine	Fox
2015	Jane the Virgin	The CW
2015	Sex & Drugs & Rock & Roll	FX
2015	The Spoils Before Dying	IFC
2015	Unbreakable Kimmy Schmidt	Netflix
2015	Veep	HBO
2016	Silicon Valley	HBO
2016	Brooklyn Nine-Nine	Fox
2016	Lady Dynamite	Netflix
2016	Love	Netflix
2016	Orange Is the New Black	Netflix
2016	Unbreakable Kimmy Schmidt	Netflix
2016	Veep	HBO
2017	GLOW	Netflix
2017	Atypical	Netflix
2017	Baskets	FX
2017	Claws	TNT
2017	Orange Is the New Black	Netflix
2017	Veep	HBO
2018	Lodge 49	AMC
2018	Arrested Development	Netflix
2018	Atlanta	FX
2018	Barry	HBO
2018	Black-ish	ABC
2018	The Good Place	NBC
2018	Insecure	HBO
2019	Fleabag	Amazon Prime Video
2019	Barry	HBO
2019	The Good Place	NBC
2019	The Kominsky Method	Netflix
2019	The Marvelous Mrs. Maisel	Amazon Prime Video
2019	The Righteous Gemstones	HBO
2019	Russian Doll	Netflix

=== 2020s ===
Year	Winners and nominees	Network
2020	Schitt's Creek	Pop TV
2020	The Boys	Amazon Prime Video
2020	Dead to Me	Netflix
2020	Insecure	HBO
2020	Ramy	Hulu
2020	What We Do in the Shadows	FX
2021	Ted Lasso	Apple TV+
2021	A Black Lady Sketch Show	HBO
2021	The Chair	Netflix
2021	Hacks	HBO
2021	Help	Channel 4
2021	The Kominsky Method	Netflix
2021	Only Murders in the Building	Hulu
2021	What We Do in the Shadows	FX
2022	Barry	HBO
2022	Atlanta	FX
2022	Hacks	HBO Max
2022	Minx	HBO Max
2022	Only Murders in the Building	Hulu
2022	Pivoting	Fox
2023	Only Murders in the Building	Hulu
2023	Abbott Elementary	ABC
2023	Barry	HBO
2023	The Bear	FX on Hulu
2023	Reservation Dogs	FX on Hulu
2023	Ted Lasso	Apple TV+
2024	Hacks	HBO Max
2024	Abbott Elementary	ABC
2024	The Curse	Paramount+
2024	English Teacher	FX/Hulu
2024	Only Murders in the Building	Hulu
2024	Platonic	Apple TV+
2025	Platonic	Apple TV
2025	Abbott Elementary	ABC
2025	The Bear	FX/Hulu
2025	English Teacher	FX/Hulu
2025	Hacks	HBO Max
2025	Only Murders in the Building	Hulu
