= List of awards and nominations received by Veep =

List of awards and nominations for Veep
Awards and nominations
Award	Wins	Nominations
ACE Eddie Awards	2	5
ADG Excellence in Production Design Awards	1	5
AFI Awards	3	3
American Comedy Awards	0	3
Artios Awards	1	4
Cinema Audio Society Awards	0	5
Critics' Choice Awards	2	14
Directors Guild of America Awards	3	5
Dorian Awards	0	5
Golden Globe Awards	0	7
Gracie Awards	3	3
HPA Awards	1	1
Humanitas Prize	1	1
Peabody Awards	1	2
People's Choice Awards	0	6
Primetime Emmy Awards	17	68
Producers Guild of America Awards	0	6
Satellite Awards	0	9
Screen Actors Guild Awards	4	10
TCA Awards	2	12
TV Guide Awards	0	2
Women's Image Awards	1	1
Writers Guild of America Awards	3	10
Writers Guild of Great Britain Awards	1	1

Totals (Note: Certain award groups do not simply award one winner. They acknowledge several different recipients, have runners-up, and have third place. Since this is a specific recognition and is different from losing an award, runner-up mentions are considered wins in this award tally. For simplification and to avoid errors, each award in this list has been presumed to have had a prior nomination.)
- Wins: 46
- Nominations: 188

Veep is an American political satire comedy television series, that premiered on HBO on April 22, 2012. The series was created by Armando Iannucci as an adaptation of the British sitcom The Thick of It.

Veep is set in the office of Selina Meyer (Julia Louis-Dreyfus), a fictional Vice President, and subsequent President, of the United States.

Veep has received critical acclaim and won several major awards, including seventeen Primetime Emmy Awards, two Critics' Choice Awards, four Screen Actors Guild Awards, two TCA Awards, three Writers Guild of America Awards, one Peabody Award, and has been nominated for seven Golden Globe Awards.

== Awards and nominations ==
Awards and nominations received by Veep
Award	Year (Note: The listed year refers to the date of the ceremony, not necessarily the year in which the corresponding season or episode aired)	Category	Nominee(s)	Result	Ref.
ACE Eddie Awards	2015	Best Edited Half-Hour Series for Television	Anthony Boys (for "Special Relationship")	Won	
ACE Eddie Awards	2016	Best Edited Half-Hour Series for Television	Gary Dollner (for "Election Night")	Nominated	
ACE Eddie Awards	2017	Best Edited Half-Hour Series for Television	Steven Rasch (for "Morning After")	Won	
ACE Eddie Awards	2017	Best Edited Half-Hour Series for Television	Shawn Paper (for "Mother")	Nominated	
ACE Eddie Awards	2018	Best Edited Comedy Series for Non-Commercial Television	Roger Nygard, Gennady Fridman (for "Chicklet")	Nominated	
ADG Excellence in Production Design Awards	2014	Excellence in Production Design for a Half Hour Single-Camera Television Series	Jim Gloster, E. David Cosier, Kenneth Roman, Beth Kuhn, Tiffany Zappulla (for "Helsinki")	Won	
ADG Excellence in Production Design Awards	2015	Excellence in Production Design for a Half Hour Single-Camera Television Series	Jim Gloster, Sharon Davis, E. David Cosier, Rosy Thomas, Kenneth Roman, April Freeman, Jennifer Engel (for "Clovis," "Special Relationship," and "Debate")	Nominated	
ADG Excellence in Production Design Awards	2016	Excellence in Production Design for a Half Hour Single-Camera Television Series	Jim Gloster, E. David Cosier, Kuo Pao Lian, Kenneth Roman, Jennifer Engel (for "Joint Session" and "Election Night")	Nominated	
ADG Excellence in Production Design Awards	2017	Excellence in Production Design for a Half Hour Single-Camera Television Series	Jim Gloster, Karen Steward, Andrew Leitch, Robert Bernard, Richard Ewan, Shelley A. Wallace, Kimberly Wannop (for "Kissing Your Sister")	Nominated	
ADG Excellence in Production Design Awards	2018	Excellence in Production Design for a Half Hour Single-Camera Television Series	Jim Gloster, Andrew Leitch, Arthur Chadwick, Alan Farkas, Graham Ratliff, Kimberly Wannop (for "Omaha")	Nominated	
AFI Awards	2013	Program of the Year	Veep	Won	
AFI Awards	2016	Program of the Year	Veep	Won	
AFI Awards	2019	Program of the Year	Veep	Won	
American Comedy Awards	2014	Comedy Series	Veep	Nominated	
American Comedy Awards	2014	Comedy Actress – TV	Julia Louis-Dreyfus	Nominated	
American Comedy Awards	2014	Comedy Supporting Actor – TV	Tony Hale	Nominated	
Artios Awards	2015	Outstanding Achievement in Casting – Television Series – Comedy	Pat Moran	Nominated	
Artios Awards	2016	Outstanding Achievement in Casting – Television Series – Comedy	Pat Moran	Nominated	
Artios Awards	2018	Outstanding Achievement in Casting – Television Series – Comedy	Dorian Frankel, Sibby Kirchgessner, Marlise Gunzenhauser	Won	
Artios Awards	2020	Outstanding Achievement in Casting – Television Series – Comedy	Dorian Frankel, Sibby Kirchgessner, Marlise Gunzenhauser	Nominated	
Cinema Audio Society Awards	2015	Outstanding Achievement in Sound Mixing for Television Series – Half Hour	William F. MacPherson, Richard Davey (for "Detroit")	Nominated	
Cinema Audio Society Awards	2016	Outstanding Achievement in Sound Mixing for Television Series – Half Hour	William F. MacPherson, Richard Davey (for "Mommy Meyer")	Nominated	
Cinema Audio Society Awards	2017	Outstanding Achievement in Sound Mixing for Television Series – Half Hour	William F. MacPherson, John W. Cook II, William Freesh (for "Congressional Ball")	Nominated	
Cinema Audio Society Awards	2018	Outstanding Achievement in Sound Mixing for Television Series – Half Hour	William F. MacPherson, John W. Cook II, William Freesh (for "Omaha")	Nominated	
Cinema Audio Society Awards	2020	Outstanding Achievement in Sound Mixing for Television Series – Half Hour	William F. MacPherson, John W. Cook II, William Freesh, Scott Sheppard, Jesse Dodd, Mike Marino (for "Veep")	Nominated	
Critics' Choice Awards	2012	Best Actress in a Comedy Series	Julia Louis-Dreyfus	Nominated	
Critics' Choice Awards	2013	Best Comedy Series	Veep	Nominated	
Critics' Choice Awards	2013	Best Actress in a Comedy Series	Julia Louis-Dreyfus	Won	
Critics' Choice Awards	2014	Best Comedy Series	Veep	Nominated	
Critics' Choice Awards	2014	Best Actress in a Comedy Series	Julia Louis-Dreyfus	Won	
Critics' Choice Awards	2014	Best Supporting Actor in a Comedy Series	Tony Hale	Nominated	
Critics' Choice Awards	2015	Best Comedy Series	Veep	Nominated	
Critics' Choice Awards	2015	Best Actress in a Comedy Series	Julia Louis-Dreyfus	Nominated	
Critics' Choice Awards	2015	Best Supporting Actor in a Comedy Series	Tony Hale	Nominated	
Critics' Choice Awards	2016	Best Comedy Series	Veep	Nominated	
Critics' Choice Awards	2016	Best Actress in a Comedy Series	Julia Louis-Dreyfus	Nominated	
Critics' Choice Awards	2016	Best Supporting Actor in a Comedy Series	Tony Hale	Nominated	
Critics' Choice Awards	2016	Best Supporting Actress in a Comedy Series	Anna Chlumsky	Nominated	
Critics' Choice Awards	2020	Best Actress in a Comedy Series	Julia Louis-Dreyfus	Nominated	
Directors Guild of America Awards	2016	Outstanding Directorial Achievement in Comedy Series	Chris Addison (Note: Additional nominees: Bill Hill (unit production manager), Dale Stern (first assistant director), Michelle Gritzer (second assistant director), Miles Perman (second second assistant director)) (for "Election Night")	Won	
Directors Guild of America Awards	2017	Outstanding Directorial Achievement in Comedy Series	Dale Stern (Note: Additional nominees: David Hyman (unit production manager), Michelle Gritzer (first assistant director), Jeff Rosenberg (second assistant director), Chris Riddle (second second assistant director), Cecilia Sweatman (additional second assistant director)) (for "Mother")	Nominated	
Directors Guild of America Awards	2017	Outstanding Directorial Achievement in Comedy Series	Becky Martin (Note: Additional nominees: David Hyman (unit production manager), Dale Stern (first assistant director), Michelle Gritzer (second assistant director), Chris Riddle (second second assistant director), Gary Cotti (additional second assistant director)) (for "Inauguration")	Won	
Directors Guild of America Awards	2018	Outstanding Directorial Achievement in Comedy Series	Beth McCarthy-Miller (Note: Additional nominees: David Hyman (unit production manager), Dale Stern (first assistant director), Jeff Rosenberg (second assistant director), Yarden Levo (second second assistant director), Chalis Romero (additional second assistant director)) (for "Chicklet")	Won	
Directors Guild of America Awards	2020	Outstanding Directorial Achievement in Comedy Series	David Mandel (Note: Additional nominees: David Hyman (unit production manager), Jeff Rosenberg (first assistant director), Emily Hogan (second assistant director), Ismael Jimenez (second second assistant director), Chalis Romero (second second assistant director), Phil Banks (additional second assistant director), Zach Davenport (additional second assistant director), Alexis Dvorak (additional second assistant director), Phil Goodrich (additional second assistant director), Christina Lee (additional second assistant director), Emily Neumann (additional second assistant director)) (for "Veep")	Nominated	
Dorian Awards	2014	TV Comedy of the Year	Veep	Nominated	
Dorian Awards	2015	TV Comedy of the Year	Veep	Nominated	
Dorian Awards	2016	TV Comedy of the Year	Veep	Nominated	
Dorian Awards	2017	TV Comedy of the Year	Veep	Nominated	
Dorian Awards	2017	TV Performance of the Year – Actress	Julia Louis-Dreyfus	Nominated	
Golden Globe Awards	2013	Best Performance by an Actress in a Television Series – Musical or Comedy	Julia Louis-Dreyfus	Nominated	
Golden Globe Awards	2014	Best Performance by an Actress in a Television Series – Musical or Comedy	Julia Louis-Dreyfus	Nominated	
Golden Globe Awards	2015	Best Performance by an Actress in a Television Series – Musical or Comedy	Julia Louis-Dreyfus	Nominated	
Golden Globe Awards	2016	Best Television Series – Musical or Comedy	Veep	Nominated	
Golden Globe Awards	2016	Best Performance by an Actress in a Television Series – Musical or Comedy	Julia Louis-Dreyfus	Nominated	
Golden Globe Awards	2017	Best Television Series – Musical or Comedy	Veep	Nominated	
Golden Globe Awards	2017	Best Performance by an Actress in a Television Series – Musical or Comedy	Julia Louis-Dreyfus	Nominated	
Gracie Awards	2014	Outstanding Comedy	Veep	Won	
Gracie Awards	2015	Outstanding Female Actor in a Supporting Role in a Musical or Comedy	Anna Chlumsky	Won	
Gracie Awards	2018	Outstanding Female Actor in a Leading Role in a Musical or Comedy	Julia Louis-Dreyfus	Won	
HPA Awards	2019	Outstanding Editing – Television (30 Minutes and Under)	Roger Nygard (for "Pledge")	Won	
Humanitas Prize	2020	Comedy Teleplay	Alex Gregory, Peter Huyck (for "South Carolina")	Won	
Peabody Awards	2015	Entertainment	HBO Entertainment in association with Dundee Productions	Nominated	
Peabody Awards	2016	Entertainment	HBO Entertainment	Honored	
People's Choice Awards	2016	Favorite Premium Cable TV Show	Veep	Nominated	
People's Choice Awards	2016	Favorite Premium Cable TV Actress	Julia Louis-Dreyfus	Nominated	
People's Choice Awards	2017	Favorite Premium Cable TV Show	Veep	Nominated	
People's Choice Awards	2017	Favorite Premium Cable TV Actress	Julia Louis-Dreyfus	Nominated	
People's Choice Awards	2019	The Comedy Show of 2019	Veep	Nominated	
People's Choice Awards	2019	The Comedy TV Star of 2019	Julia Louis-Dreyfus	Nominated	
Primetime Emmy Awards	2012	Outstanding Comedy Series	Veep (Note: Nominees: Armando Iannucci, Christopher Godsick, Frank Rich, Simon Blackwell, Tony Roche, Julia Louis-Dreyfus, Stephanie Laing)	Nominated	
Primetime Emmy Awards	2012	Outstanding Lead Actress in a Comedy Series	Julia Louis-Dreyfus (for "Tears")	Won	
Primetime Emmy Awards	2013	Outstanding Comedy Series	Veep	Nominated	
Primetime Emmy Awards	2013	Outstanding Lead Actress in a Comedy Series	Julia Louis-Dreyfus (for "Running")	Won	
Primetime Emmy Awards	2013	Outstanding Supporting Actor in a Comedy Series	Tony Hale (for "Running")	Won	
Primetime Emmy Awards	2013	Outstanding Supporting Actress in a Comedy Series	Anna Chlumsky (for "First Response")	Nominated	
Primetime Emmy Awards	2014	Outstanding Comedy Series	Veep (Note: Nominees: Armando Iannucci, Christopher Godsick, Frank Rich, Simon Blackwell, Tony Roche, Chris Addison, Roger Drew, Sean Gray, Ian Martin, Will Smith, Julia Louis-Dreyfus, Stephanie Laing)	Nominated	
Primetime Emmy Awards	2014	Outstanding Lead Actress in a Comedy Series	Julia Louis-Dreyfus (for "Crate")	Won	
Primetime Emmy Awards	2014	Outstanding Supporting Actor in a Comedy Series	Tony Hale (for "Crate")	Nominated	
Primetime Emmy Awards	2014	Outstanding Supporting Actress in a Comedy Series	Anna Chlumsky (for "Detroit")	Nominated	
Primetime Emmy Awards	2014	Outstanding Writing for a Comedy Series	Simon Blackwell, Armando Iannucci, Tony Roche (for "Special Relationship")	Nominated	
Primetime Emmy Awards	2015	Outstanding Comedy Series	Veep (Note: Nominees: Armando Iannucci, Christopher Godsick, Frank Rich, Chris Addison, Simon Blackwell, Tony Roche, Julia Louis-Dreyfus, Stephanie Laing, Kevin Cecil, Roger Drew, Sean Gray, Ian Martin, Georgia Pritchett, David Quantick, Andy Riley, Will Smith, Bill Hill)	Won	
Primetime Emmy Awards	2015	Outstanding Lead Actress in a Comedy Series	Julia Louis-Dreyfus (for "Election Night")	Won	
Primetime Emmy Awards	2015	Outstanding Supporting Actor in a Comedy Series	Tony Hale (for "East Wing")	Won	
Primetime Emmy Awards	2015	Outstanding Supporting Actress in a Comedy Series	Anna Chlumsky (for "Convention")	Nominated	
Primetime Emmy Awards	2015	Outstanding Directing for a Comedy Series	Armando Iannucci (for "Testimony")	Nominated	
Primetime Emmy Awards	2015	Outstanding Writing for a Comedy Series	Simon Blackwell, Armando Iannucci, Tony Roche (for "Election Night")	Won	
Primetime Emmy Awards	2016	Outstanding Comedy Series	Veep (Note: Nominees: David Mandel, Frank Rich, Julia Louis-Dreyfus, Lew Morton, Christopher Godsick, Morgan Sackett, Sean Gray, Peter Huyck, Alex Gregory, Jim Margolis, Georgia Pritchett, Will Smith, Chris Addison, Rachel Axler, David Hyman, Erik Kenward, Billy Kimball, Steve Koren)	Won	
Primetime Emmy Awards	2016	Outstanding Lead Actress in a Comedy Series	Julia Louis-Dreyfus (for "Mother")	Won	
Primetime Emmy Awards	2016	Outstanding Supporting Actor in a Comedy Series	Tony Hale (for "Inauguration")	Nominated	
Primetime Emmy Awards	2016	Outstanding Supporting Actor in a Comedy Series	Matt Walsh (for "Kissing Your Sister")	Nominated	
Primetime Emmy Awards	2016	Outstanding Supporting Actress in a Comedy Series	Anna Chlumsky (for "C**tgate")	Nominated	
Primetime Emmy Awards	2016	Outstanding Directing for a Comedy Series	Chris Addison (for "Morning After")	Nominated	
Primetime Emmy Awards	2016	Outstanding Directing for a Comedy Series	Dale Stern (for "Mother")	Nominated	
Primetime Emmy Awards	2016	Outstanding Directing for a Comedy Series	David Mandel (for "Kissing Your Sister")	Nominated	
Primetime Emmy Awards	2016	Outstanding Writing for a Comedy Series	David Mandel (for "Morning After")	Nominated	
Primetime Emmy Awards	2016	Outstanding Writing for a Comedy Series	Alex Gregory, Peter Huyck (for "Mother")	Nominated	
Primetime Emmy Awards	2017	Outstanding Comedy Series	Veep (Note: Nominees: David Mandel, Frank Rich, Julia Louis-Dreyfus, Lew Morton, Morgan Sackett, Peter Huyck, Alex Gregory, Georgia Pritchett, Jennifer Crittenden, Gabrielle Allan, Ian Maxtone-Graham, Steve Hely, Ted Cohen, David Hyman, Rachel Axler, Billy Kimball, Dale Stern, Erik Kenward, Dan Mintz)	Won	
Primetime Emmy Awards	2017	Outstanding Lead Actress in a Comedy Series	Julia Louis-Dreyfus (for "Groundbreaking")	Won	
Primetime Emmy Awards	2017	Outstanding Supporting Actor in a Comedy Series	Tony Hale (for "Judge")	Nominated	
Primetime Emmy Awards	2017	Outstanding Supporting Actor in a Comedy Series	Matt Walsh (For "Chicklet")	Nominated	
Primetime Emmy Awards	2017	Outstanding Supporting Actress in a Comedy Series	Anna Chlumsky (for "Groundbreaking")	Nominated	
Primetime Emmy Awards	2017	Outstanding Directing for a Comedy Series	Dale Stern (for "Justice")	Nominated	
Primetime Emmy Awards	2017	Outstanding Directing for a Comedy Series	Morgan Sackett (for "Blurb")	Nominated	
Primetime Emmy Awards	2017	Outstanding Directing for a Comedy Series	David Mandel (for "Groundbreaking")	Nominated	
Primetime Emmy Awards	2017	Outstanding Writing for a Comedy Series	Billy Kimball (for "Georgia")	Nominated	
Primetime Emmy Awards	2017	Outstanding Writing for a Comedy Series	David Mandel (for "Groundbreaking")	Nominated	
Primetime Emmy Awards	2019	Outstanding Comedy Series	Veep (Note: Nominees: David Mandel, Frank Rich, Julia Louis-Dreyfus, Lew Morton, Morgan Sackett, Peter Huyck, Alex Gregory, Jennifer Crittenden, Gabrielle Allan, Billy Kimball, Rachel Axler, Ted Cohen, Ian Maxtone-Graham, Dan O'Keefe, Steve Hely, David Hyman, Georgia Pritchett, Doug Smith, Erik Kenward, Dan Mintz)	Nominated	
Primetime Emmy Awards	2019	Outstanding Lead Actress in a Comedy Series	Julia Louis-Dreyfus (for "Veep")	Nominated	
Primetime Emmy Awards	2019	Outstanding Supporting Actor in a Comedy Series	Tony Hale (for "Veep")	Nominated	
Primetime Emmy Awards	2019	Outstanding Supporting Actress in a Comedy Series	Anna Chlumsky (for "Pledge")	Nominated	
Primetime Emmy Awards	2019	Outstanding Writing for a Comedy Series	David Mandel (for "Veep")	Nominated	
Primetime Creative Arts Emmy Awards	2012	Outstanding Casting for a Comedy Series	Allison Jones, Pat Moran, Jennifer Euston	Nominated	
Primetime Creative Arts Emmy Awards	2013	Outstanding Casting for a Comedy Series	Allison Jones, Pat Moran, Meredith Tucker	Nominated	
Primetime Creative Arts Emmy Awards	2014	Outstanding Guest Actor in a Comedy Series	Gary Cole (for "Crate")	Nominated	
Primetime Creative Arts Emmy Awards	2014	Outstanding Casting for a Comedy Series	Allison Jones, Pat Moran, Meredith Tucker	Nominated	
Primetime Creative Arts Emmy Awards	2014	Outstanding Production Design for a Narrative Program (Half-Hour or Less)	Jim Gloster, Sharon Davis, Jennifer Engel (for "Clovis")	Nominated	
Primetime Creative Arts Emmy Awards	2014	Outstanding Sound Mixing for a Comedy or Drama Series (Half-Hour) and Animation	William F. MacPherson, Richard Davey (for "Detroit")	Nominated	
Primetime Creative Arts Emmy Awards	2015	Outstanding Casting for a Comedy Series	Allison Jones, Meredith Tucker, Pat Moran	Won	
Primetime Creative Arts Emmy Awards	2015	Outstanding Production Design for a Narrative Program (Half-Hour or Less)	Jim Gloster, E. David Cosier, Jennifer Engel (for "Joint Session")	Nominated	
Primetime Creative Arts Emmy Awards	2015	Outstanding Sound Mixing for a Comedy or Drama Series (Half-Hour) and Animation	William F. MacPherson, Richard Davey (for "Mommy Meyer")	Nominated	
Primetime Creative Arts Emmy Awards	2016	Outstanding Guest Actor in a Comedy Series	Martin Mull (for "The Eagle")	Nominated	
Primetime Creative Arts Emmy Awards	2016	Outstanding Casting for a Comedy Series	Allison Jones, Ben Harris	Won	
Primetime Creative Arts Emmy Awards	2016	Outstanding Production Design for a Narrative Program (Half-Hour or Less)	Jim Gloster, Karen Steward, Kimberly Wannop (for "The Eagle" and "C**tgate")	Nominated	
Primetime Creative Arts Emmy Awards	2016	Outstanding Single-Camera Picture Editing for a Comedy Series	Shawn Paper (for "Mother")	Nominated	
Primetime Creative Arts Emmy Awards	2016	Outstanding Single-Camera Picture Editing for a Comedy Series	Steven Rasch (for "Inauguration")	Nominated	
Primetime Creative Arts Emmy Awards	2016	Outstanding Sound Mixing for a Comedy or Drama Series (Half-Hour) and Animation	John W. Cook II, William Freesh, William F. MacPherson (for "Congressional Ball")	Nominated	
Primetime Creative Arts Emmy Awards	2017	Outstanding Guest Actor in a Comedy Series	Hugh Laurie (for "Blurb")	Nominated	
Primetime Creative Arts Emmy Awards	2017	Outstanding Casting for a Comedy Series	Dorian Frankel, Sibby Kirchgessner	Won	
Primetime Creative Arts Emmy Awards	2017	Outstanding Cinematography for a Single-Camera Series (Half-Hour)	David Miller (for "Qatar")	Won	
Primetime Creative Arts Emmy Awards	2017	Outstanding Production Design for a Narrative Program (Half-Hour or Less)	Jim Gloster, Andrew Leitch, Kimberly Wannop (for "Omaha")	Won	
Primetime Creative Arts Emmy Awards	2017	Outstanding Single-Camera Picture Editing for a Comedy Series	Roger Nygard, Gennady Fridman (for "Chicklet")	Nominated	
Primetime Creative Arts Emmy Awards	2017	Outstanding Single-Camera Picture Editing for a Comedy Series	Eric Kissack (for "Groundbreaking")	Nominated	
Primetime Creative Arts Emmy Awards	2017	Outstanding Sound Mixing for a Comedy or Drama Series (Half-Hour) and Animation	John W. Cook II, William Freesh, William F. MacPherson (for "Omaha")	Nominated	
Primetime Creative Arts Emmy Awards	2019	Outstanding Guest Actor in a Comedy Series	Peter MacNicol (for "Oslo")	Nominated	
Primetime Creative Arts Emmy Awards	2019	Outstanding Casting for a Comedy Series	Dorian Frankel, Sibby Kirchgessner	Nominated	
Primetime Creative Arts Emmy Awards	2019	Outstanding Production Design for a Narrative Program (Half-Hour or Less)	Jim Gloster, Andrew Leitch, Kimberly Wannop, David Smith (for "Veep")	Nominated	
Primetime Creative Arts Emmy Awards	2019	Outstanding Sound Mixing for a Comedy or Drama Series (Half-Hour) and Animation	John W. Cook II, William Freesh, William F. MacPherson (for "Veep")	Nominated	
Producers Guild of America Awards	2014	Outstanding Producer of Episodic Television, Comedy	Armando Iannucci, Christopher Godsick, Frank Rich, Simon Blackwell, Tony Roche, Julia Louis-Dreyfus, Stephanie Laing	Nominated	
Producers Guild of America Awards	2015	Outstanding Producer of Episodic Television, Comedy	Armando Iannucci, Christopher Godsick, Frank Rich, Simon Blackwell, Tony Roche, Chris Addison, Julia Louis-Dreyfus, Stephanie Laing	Nominated	
Producers Guild of America Awards	2016	Outstanding Producer of Episodic Television, Comedy	Armando Iannucci, Christopher Godsick, Frank Rich, Chris Addison, Simon Blackwell, Tony Roche, Julia Louis-Dreyfus, Stephanie Laing, Kevin Cecil, Roger Drew, Sean Gray, Ian Martin, Georgia Pritchett, David Quantick, Andy Riley, Will Smith, Bill Hill	Nominated	
Producers Guild of America Awards	2017	Outstanding Producer of Episodic Television, Comedy	David Mandel, Frank Rich, Julia Louis-Dreyfus, Lew Morton, Christopher Godsick, Morgan Sackett, Sean Gray, Peter Huyck, Alex Gregory, Jim Margolis, Georgia Pritchett, Will Smith, Chris Addison, Rachel Axler, David Hyman, Erik Kenward, Billy Kimball, Steve Koren	Nominated	
Producers Guild of America Awards	2018	Outstanding Producer of Episodic Television, Comedy	David Mandel, Frank Rich, Julia Louis-Dreyfus, Lew Morton, Morgan Sackett, Peter Huyck, Alex Gregory, Georgia Pritchett, Jennifer Crittenden, Gabrielle Allan, Ian Maxtone-Graham, Steve Hely, Ted Cohen, David Hyman, Rachel Axler, Billy Kimball, Dale Stern, Erik Kenward, Dan Mintz	Nominated	
Producers Guild of America Awards	2020	Outstanding Producer of Episodic Television, Comedy	David Mandel, Frank Rich, Julia Louis-Dreyfus, Lew Morton, Morgan Sackett, Peter Huyck, Alex Gregory, Jennifer Crittenden, Gabrielle Allan, Billy Kimball, Rachel Axler, Ted Cohen, Ian Maxtone-Graham, Dan O'Keefe, Steve Hely, David Hyman, Georgia Pritchett, Doug Smith, Erik Kenward, Dan Mintz	Nominated	
Satellite Awards	2012	Best Actress in a Series, Musical or Comedy	Julia Louis-Dreyfus	Nominated	
Satellite Awards	2013	Best Television Series, Musical or Comedy	Veep	Nominated	
Satellite Awards	2013	Best Actress in a Series, Musical or Comedy	Julia Louis-Dreyfus	Nominated	
Satellite Awards	2014	Best Television Series, Musical or Comedy	Veep	Nominated	
Satellite Awards	2014	Best Actress in a Series, Musical or Comedy	Julia Louis-Dreyfus	Nominated	
Satellite Awards	2015	Best Television Series, Musical or Comedy	Veep	Nominated	
Satellite Awards	2015	Best Actress in a Series, Musical or Comedy	Julia Louis-Dreyfus	Nominated	
Satellite Awards	2016	Best Television Series, Musical or Comedy	Veep	Nominated	
Satellite Awards	2017	Best Television Series, Musical or Comedy	Veep	Nominated	
Satellite Awards	2017	Best Actress in a Series, Musical or Comedy	Julia Louis-Dreyfus	Nominated	
Screen Actors Guild Awards	2013	Outstanding Performance by a Female Actor in a Comedy Series	Julia Louis-Dreyfus	Won	
Screen Actors Guild Awards	2013	Outstanding Performance by an Ensemble in a Comedy Series	Sufe Bradshaw, Anna Chlumsky, Gary Cole, Kevin Dunn, Tony Hale, Julia Louis-Dreyfus, Reid Scott, Timothy Simons, Matt Walsh	Nominated	
Screen Actors Guild Awards	2014	Outstanding Performance by a Female Actor in a Comedy Series	Julia Louis-Dreyfus	Nominated	
Screen Actors Guild Awards	2014	Outstanding Performance by an Ensemble in a Comedy Series	Sufe Bradshaw, Anna Chlumsky, Gary Cole, Kevin Dunn, Tony Hale, Julia Louis-Dreyfus, Reid Scott, Timothy Simons, Matt Walsh	Nominated	
Screen Actors Guild Awards	2015	Outstanding Performance by a Female Actor in a Comedy Series	Julia Louis-Dreyfus	Nominated	
Screen Actors Guild Awards	2015	Outstanding Performance by an Ensemble in a Comedy Series	Diedrich Bader, Sufe Bradshaw, Anna Chlumsky, Gary Cole, Kevin Dunn, Tony Hale, Hugh Laurie, Julia Louis-Dreyfus, Phil Reeves, Sam Richardson, Reid Scott, Timothy Simons, Sarah Sutherland, Matt Walsh	Nominated	
Screen Actors Guild Awards	2016	Outstanding Performance by a Female Actor in a Comedy Series	Julia Louis-Dreyfus	Won	
Screen Actors Guild Awards	2016	Outstanding Performance by an Ensemble in a Comedy Series	Dan Bakkedahl, Sufe Bradshaw, Anna Chlumsky, Gary Cole, Kevin Dunn, Clea DuVall, Nelson Franklin, Tony Hale, Hugh Laurie, Julia Louis-Dreyfus, Sam Richardson, Reid Scott, Timothy Simons, John Slattery, Sarah Sutherland, Matt Walsh, Wayne Wilderson	Nominated	
Screen Actors Guild Awards	2017	Outstanding Performance by a Female Actor in a Comedy Series	Julia Louis-Dreyfus	Won	
Screen Actors Guild Awards	2017	Outstanding Performance by an Ensemble in a Comedy Series	Dan Bakkedahl, Anna Chlumsky, Gary Cole, Margaret Colin, Kevin Dunn, Clea Duvall, Nelson Franklin, Tony Hale, Julia Louis-Dreyfus, Sam Richardson, Paul Scheer, Reid Scott, Timothy Simons, Sarah Sutherland, Matt Walsh	Won	
TCA Awards	2012	Individual Achievement in Comedy	Julia Louis-Dreyfus	Nominated	
TCA Awards	2013	Outstanding Achievement in Comedy	Veep	Nominated	
TCA Awards	2013	Individual Achievement in Comedy	Julia Louis-Dreyfus	Nominated	
TCA Awards	2014	Outstanding Achievement in Comedy	Veep	Won (Note: Tied with Louie)	
TCA Awards	2014	Individual Achievement in Comedy	Julia Louis-Dreyfus	Won	
TCA Awards	2015	Individual Achievement in Comedy	Julia Louis-Dreyfus	Nominated	
TCA Awards	2016	Outstanding Achievement in Comedy	Veep	Nominated	
TCA Awards	2016	Individual Achievement in Comedy	Julia Louis-Dreyfus	Nominated	
TCA Awards	2017	Outstanding Achievement in Comedy	Veep	Nominated	
TCA Awards	2017	Individual Achievement in Comedy	Julia Louis-Dreyfus	Nominated	
TCA Awards	2019	Outstanding Achievement in Comedy	Veep	Nominated	
TCA Awards	2019	Individual Achievement in Comedy	Julia Louis-Dreyfus	Nominated	
TV Guide Awards	2014	Favorite Comedy Series	Veep	Nominated	
TV Guide Awards	2014	Favorite Actress	Julia Louis-Dreyfus	Nominated	
Women's Image Awards	2014	Actress Comedy Series	Julia Louis-Dreyfus (for "Crate")	Won	
Writers Guild of America Awards	2013	Television: New Series	Jesse Armstrong, Simon Blackwell, Roger Drew, Sean Gray, Armando Iannucci, Ian Martin, Tony Roche, Will Smith	Nominated	
Writers Guild of America Awards	2014	Television: Comedy Series	Simon Blackwell, Roger Drew, Sean Gray, Armando Iannucci, Ian Martin, Georgia Pritchett, David Quantick, Tony Roche, Will Smith	Won	
Writers Guild of America Awards	2015	Television: Comedy Series	Simon Blackwell, Kevin Cecil, Roger Drew, Sean Gray, Armando Iannucci, Ian Martin, Georgia Pritchett, David Quantick, Andy Riley, Tony Roche, Will Smith	Nominated	
Writers Guild of America Awards	2016	Television: Comedy Series	Simon Blackwell, Jon Brown, Kevin Cecil, Roger Drew, Peter Fellows, Neil Gibbons, Rob Gibbons, Sean Gray, Callie Hersheway, Armando Iannucci, Sean Love, Ian Martin, Georgia Pritchett, David Quantick, Andy Riley, Tony Roche, Will Smith	Won	
Writers Guild of America Awards	2016	Television: Episodic Comedy	Armando Iannucci, Simon Blackwell, Georgia Pritchett (for "Joint Session")	Nominated	
Writers Guild of America Awards	2017	Television: Comedy Series	Rachel Axler, Sean Gray, Alex Gregory, Peter Huyck, Eric Kenward, Billy Kimball, Steve Koren, David Mandel, Jim Margolis, Lew Morton, Georgia Pritchett, Will Smith, Alexis Wilkinson	Nominated	
Writers Guild of America Awards	2018	Television: Comedy Series	Gabrielle Allan, Rachel Axler, Emilia Barrosse, Ted Cohen, Jennifer Crittenden, Alex Gregory, Steve Hely, Peter Huyck, Erik Kenward, Billy Kimball, David Mandel, Ian Maxtone-Graham, Dan Mintz, Lew Morton, Dan O'Keefe, Georgia Pritchett, Leila Strachan	Won	
Writers Guild of America Awards	2018	Television: Episodic Comedy	Ted Cohen (for "Judge")	Nominated	
Writers Guild of America Awards	2019	Television: Episodic Comedy	David Mandel (for "Veep")	Nominated	
Writers Guild of America Awards	2020	Television: Comedy Series	Rachel Axler, Sean Gray, Alex Gregory, Peter Huyck, Eric Kenward, Billy Kimball, Steve Koren, David Mandel, Jim Margolis, Lew Morton, Georgia Pritchett, Will Smith, Alexis Wilkinson	Nominated	
Writers Guild of Great Britain Awards	2016	Best TV Situation Comedy	Simon Blackwell, Jon Brown, Kevin Cecil, Roger Drew, Peter Fellows, Neil Gibbons, Rob Gibbons, Sean Gray, Callie Hersheway, Armando Iannucci, Sean Love, Ian Martin, Georgia Pritchett, David Quantick, Andy Riley, Tony Roche, Will Smith	Won	
