= Artios Award for Outstanding Achievement in Comedy Pilot Casting =

The Artios Award for Outstanding Achievement in Comedy Pilot Casting is an award handed out annually by the Casting Society of America. It was introduced at the Art Directors Guilds' twelfth annual honors, in 1996 (honoring work from the previous year, as well as early months of the ceremony's year), after first being grouped together with casting for dramatic pilot episodes for the category Outstanding Achievement in Pilot Casting, which was introduced at the seventh annual awards in 1991. It is an award that is given to casting directors for their work on television pilot episodes, or a series first episode.

== Winners and nominations ==
=== 1990s ===
Year	Program	Nominees	Network
1995-1996 (12th)
1995-1996 (12th)	3rd Rock from the Sun	Mark Hirschfeld, Michael A. Katcher, Meg Liberman	NBC
1995-1996 (12th)	Almost Perfect	Jeff Greenberg, Sheila Guthrie	CBS
1995-1996 (12th)	Caroline in the City	Gilda Stratton	NBC
1995-1996 (12th)	High Society	Leslie Litt	CBS
1995-1996 (12th)	Partners	Megan Branman	Fox
1996-1997 (13th)
1996-1997 (13th)	Spin City	Mark Hirschfeld, Michael A. Katcher, Meg Liberman	NBC
1996-1997 (13th)	Everybody Loves Raymond	Lisa Miller	CBS
1996-1997 (13th)	Just Shoot Me!	Deborah Barylski	NBC
1996-1997 (13th)	Suddenly Susan	Mark Saks, Anthony Sepulveda	NBC
1996-1997 (13th)	Townies	Andrea Cohen	ABC
1997-1998 (14th)
1997-1998 (14th)	Dharma & Greg	Nikki Valko	ABC
1997-1998 (14th)	For Your Love	Geraldine Leder, Barbara Miller	NBC
1997-1998 (14th)	The Gregory Hines Show	Eric Dawson, Carol Kritzer, Robert J. Ulrich	CBS
1997-1998 (14th)	Union Square	Gilda Stratton	NBC
1997-1998 (14th)	Veronica's Closet	Leslie Litt, Barbara Miller	NBC
1998-1999 (15th)
1998-1999 (15th)	Will & Grace	Tracy Lilienfield	NBC
1998-1999 (15th)	It's Like, You Know...	Marc Hirschfeld, Meg Liberman	ABC
1998-1999 (15th)	Maximum Bob	David Rubin, Debra Zane	ABC
1998-1999 (15th)	Sports Night	Paula Rosenberg, Bonnie Zane	ABC
1998-1999 (15th)	That '70s Show	Marc Hirschfeld, Meg Liberman	Fox
1999-2000 (16th)
1999-2000 (16th)	Malcolm in the Middle	Mary V. Buck, Susan Edelman	Fox
1999-2000 (16th)	Beggars and Choosers	Marc Hirschfeld, Meg Liberman, Joel Thurm	Showtime
1999-2000 (16th)	Popular	Eric Dawson, Carol Kritzer, Robert J. Ulrich	The WB
1999-2000 (16th)	Stark Raving Mad	Jeff Greenberg	NBC
1999-2000 (16th)	Titus	Sheila Guthrie	Fox

=== 2000s ===
Year	Program	Nominees	Network
2000-2001 (17th)
2000-2001 (17th)	Ed	Bonnie Zane	NBC
2000-2001 (17th)	Grosse Pointe	Greg Orson	The WB
2000-2001 (17th)	Grounded for Life	Meg Liberman, Cami Patton	Fox
2000-2001 (17th)	That's My Bush!	Cathy Henderson, Dori Zuckerman	Comedy Central
2000-2001 (17th)	What About Joan?	Mali Finn, Stuart Howard, Howard Meltzer, Amy Schecter, Claire Simon	ABC
2001-2002 (18th)
2001-2002 (18th)	Scrubs	Brett Benner, Debby Romano	NBC
2001-2002 (18th)	The Bernie Mac Show	Reuben Cannon	Fox
2001-2002 (18th)	The Ellen Show	Tammara Billik	CBS
2001-2002 (18th)	George Lopez	Mary V. Buck, Susan Edelman	ABC
2001-2002 (18th)	The Mind of the Married Man	Sharon Bialy	HBO
2002-2003 (19th)
2002-2003 (19th)	Oliver Beene	Geraldine Leder	Fox
2002-2003 (19th)	8 Simple Rules	Lori Openden	ABC
2002-2003 (19th)	Hidden Hills	Pamela Basker, Ted Hann	NBC
2002-2003 (19th)	In-Laws	Jeff Greenberg	NBC
2002-2003 (19th)	Life With Bonnie	Deborah Barylski	ABC
2003-2004 (20th)
2003-2004 (20th)	Arrested Development	Deborah Barylski	Fox
2003-2004 (20th)	Cracking Up	Geraldine Leder	Fox
2003-2004 (20th)	It’s All Relative	Richard Hicks	ABC
2003-2004 (20th)	Two and a Half Men	Nikki Valko & Ken Miller	CBS
2003-2004 (20th)	Wonderfalls	Mali Finn, John Buchan (Canadian casting)	Fox
2004-2005 (21st)
2004-2005 (21st)	Desperate Housewives	Scott Genkinger, Junie Lowry Johnson	ABC
2004-2005 (21st)	Committed	Brett Benner, Debby Romano	NBC
2004-2005 (21st)	Entourage	Sheila Jaffe, Georgianne Walken	HBO
2004-2005 (21st)	Stacked	Geraldine Leder	Fox
2004-2005 (21st)	Unscripted	Cathy Sandrich Gelfond, Amanda Mackey	HBO
2005-2006 (22nd)
2005-2006 (22nd)	My Name Is Earl	Dava Waite	NBC
2005-2006 (22nd)	How I Met Your Mother	Megan Branman	CBS
2005-2006 (22nd)	Out of Practice	David Rubin & Richard Hicks	CBS
2005-2006 (22nd)	The Comeback	Meg Liberman & Cami Patton	HBO
2005-2006 (22nd)	The New Adventures of Old Christine	Tracy Lilienfield	CBS
2006-2007 (23rd)
2006-2007 (23rd)	Ugly Betty	Junie Lowry Johnson, Bernard Telsey (location casting)	ABC
2006-2007 (23rd)	The Class	Bruce H. Newberg	CBS
2006-2007 (23rd)	Men in Trees	Lisa Beach & Sarah Katzman; Stuart Aikins & Sean Cossey (Canadian casting)	ABC
2006-2007 (23rd)	My Boys	Tracy Lilienfield	TBS
2006-2007 (23rd)	Psych	Liz Marx; Stuart Aikins & Sean Cossey (Canadian casting)	USA
2007-2008 (24th)
2007-2008 (24th)	Pushing Daisies	Meg Liberman, Cami Patton	ABC
2007-2008 (24th)	Californication	Felicia Fasano, Pat McCorkle (original NY casting)	Showtime
2007-2008 (24th)	Chuck	Patrick J. Rush	NBC
2007-2008 (24th)	Flight of the Conchords	Cindy Tolan	HBO
2007-2008 (24th)	Samantha Who?	Tammara Billik, Jason Wood	ABC
2008-2009 (25th)
2008-2009 (25th)	Glee	Eric Dawon, Carol Kritzer, Robert J. Ulrich; Jim Carnahan (NY casting)	Fox
2008-2009 (25th)	Eastbound & Down	Juel Bestrop, Seth Yanklewitz; Craig Fincannon & Lisa Mae Fincannon (location casting)	HBO
2008-2009 (25th)	Easy Money	Gayle Pillsbury, Bonnie Zane	The CW
2008-2009 (25th)	Kath & Kim	Collin Daniel, Brett Greenstein	NBC
2008-2009 (25th)	In the Motherhood	Collin Daniel, Brett Greenstein	ABC
2009-2010 (26th)
2009-2010 (26th)	Modern Family	Jeff Greenberg	ABC
2009-2010 (26th)	Bored to Death	Kim Miscia	HBO
2009-2010 (26th)	Community	Dava Waite	NBC
2009-2010 (26th)	Hung	Lisa Beach & Sarah Katzman	HBO
2009-2010 (26th)	Nurse Jackie	Julie Tucker & Ross Meyerson	Showtime

=== 2010s ===
Year	Program	Nominees	Network
2010-2011 (27th)
2010-2011 (27th)	Raising Hope	Dava Waite	Fox
2010-2011 (27th)	The Big C	Ross Meyerson, Julie Tucker	Showtime
2010-2011 (27th)	Hot in Cleveland	Collin Daniel, Brett Greenstein	TV Land
2010-2011 (27th)	Mike & Molly	Ken Miller, Nikki Valko	CBS
2010-2011 (27th)	Mr. Sunshine	Francine Maisler	ABC
2011-2012 (28th)
2011-2012 (28th)	Girls	Jennifer Euston	HBO
2011-2012 (28th)	Don't Trust the B— in Apartment 23	Lisa Miller Katz	ABC
2011-2012 (28th)	House of Lies	Felicia Fasano, Erica Silverman (Associate)	Showtime
2011-2012 (28th)	New Girl	Juel Bestrop, Seth Yanklewitz	Fox
2011-2012 (28th)	2 Broke Girls	Julie Ashton-Barson	CBS
2011-2012 (28th)	Up All Night	Shani Ginsberg, Jeff Greenberg; Allen Hooper (Associate)	NBC
2012-2013 (29th)
2012-2013 (29th)	The Mindy Project	Felicia Fasano	Fox
2012-2013 (29th)	Animal Practice	Lisa Miller Katz	NBC
2012-2013 (29th)	Guys with Kids	Juel Bestrop, Seth Yanklewitz	NBC
2012-2013 (29th)	How to Live with Your Parents (For the Rest of Your Life)	Susan Edelman, Jeff Greenberg	ABC
2012-2013 (29th)	Partners	Julie Ashton-Barson	CBS
2013-2014 (30th)
2013-2014 (30th)	Orange is the New Black	Jennifer Euston	Netflix
2013-2014 (30th)	The Goldbergs	Leslie Litt	ABC
2013-2014 (30th)	Looking	Carmen Cuba; Nina Henninger, Bernard Telsey (location casting); Abbie Brady-Dalton, Wittney Horton (associates)	HBO
2013-2014 (30th)	Mom	Ken Miller, Nikki Valko; Peter Pappas (associate)	CBS
2013-2014 (30th)	Silicon Valley	Nicole Abellera, Jeanne McCarthy	HBO
2014-2015 (31st)
2014-2015 (31st)	Transparent	Eyde Belasco	Amazon
2014-2015 (31st)	Black-ish	Alexis Frank Koczara, Christine Smith Shevchenko; Amanda Lenker Doyle (associate)	ABC
2014-2015 (31st)	Grace and Frankie	Tracy Lilienfield, Wittney Horton (associate)	Netflix
2014-2015 (31st)	Jane the Virgin	Jonathan Clay Harris, Alyson Silverberg	The CW
2014-2015 (31st)	Unbreakable Kimmy Schmidt	Jennifer Euston, Emer O’Callaghan (associate)	Netflix
2015-2016 (32nd)
2015-2016 (32nd)	Crazy Ex-Girlfriend	Felicia Fasano, Bernard Telsey, Tim Payne; Tara Nostramo, Conrad Woolfe, Abbie Brady-Dalton (associates)	The CW
2015-2016 (32nd)	Casual	John Papsidera, Deanna Brigidi	Hulu
2015-2016 (32nd)	Scream Queens	Richard Hicks; Meagan Lewis (location casting); Chris Redondo (associate)	Fox
2015-2016 (32nd)	Superstore	Susie Farris, Collin Daniel, Brett Greenstein; Sherie Hernandez, Melanie Crescenz (associates)	NBC
2015-2016 (32nd)	Wet Hot American Summer: First Day of Camp	Susie Farris, Melanie Crescenz	Netflix
2016-2017 (33rd)
2016-2017 (33rd)	Atlanta	Alexa L. Fogel; Tara Feldstein Bennett, Chase Paris (location casting); Kathryn Zamora-Benson (associate)	FX
2016-2017 (33rd)	Better Things	Felicia Fasano; Tara Nostramo (associate)	FX
2016-2017 (33rd)	Dear White People	Kim Coleman	Netflix
2016-2017 (33rd)	I Love Dick	Eyde Belasco	Amazon Prime Video
2016-2017 (33rd)	Insecure	Victoria Thomas	HBO
2017-2018 (34th)
2017-2018 (34th)	The Marvelous Mrs. Maisel	Jeanie Bacharach, Cindy Tolan; Anne Davison, Betsy Fippinger (associates)	Amazon Prime Video
2017-2018 (34th)	Atypical	Bernard Telsey, Tiffany Little Canfield, Josh Einsohn; Ryan Bernard Tymensky, Rachel Dill (associates)	Netflix
2017-2018 (34th)	Barry	Sherry Thomas, Sharon Bialy; Stacia Kimler (associate)	HBO
2017-2018 (34th)	GLOW	Jennifer Euston, Elizabeth Barnes; Seth Caskey (associate)	Netflix
2017-2018 (34th)	Young Sheldon	Nikki Valko, Ken Miller, Peter Pappas	CBS
2018-2019 (35th)
2018-2019 (35th)	Russian Doll	Christine Kromer; Andrew Femenella (associate)	Netflix
2018-2019 (35th)	Dead to Me	Sherry Thomas, Sharon Bialy, Russell Scott	Netflix
2018-2019 (35th)	The Kominsky Method	Nikki Valko, Ken Miller, Tara Treacy	Netflix
2018-2019 (35th)	PEN15	Melissa DeLizia	Hulu
2018-2019 (35th)	Shrill	Collin Daniel, Brett Greenstein	Hulu
2019-2020 (36th)
2019-2020 (36th)	The Great	Rose Wicksteed	Hulu
2019-2020 (36th)	Modern Love	Laura Rosenthal, Maribeth Fox, Jodi Angstreich	Amazon Prime Video
2019-2020 (36th)	Never Have I Ever	Brett Greenstein, Collin Daniel; Danny Dunitz (associate)	Netflix
2019-2020 (36th)	The Politician	Alexa L. Fogel; Kathryn Zamora-Benson, Alison Goodman (associates)	Netflix
2019-2020 (36th)	Zoey's Extraordinary Playlist	Robert J. Ulrich, Eric Dawson, Carol Kritzer, Alex Newman; Coreen Mayrs, Heike Brandstatter, Erinn Lally, Annalese Tilling (location casting)	NBC

=== 2020s ===
Year	Program	Nominees	Network
2020-2021 (37th)
2020-2021 (37th)	Ted Lasso	Theo Park; Olissa Rogers (associate)	Apple TV+
2020-2021 (37th)	The Flight Attendant	John Papsidera, Kim Miscia, Beth Bowling	HBO Max
2020-2021 (37th)	Girls5eva	Cindy Tolan, Anne Davison	Peacock
2020-2021 (37th)	Hacks	Jeanne McCarthy, Nicole Abellera Hallman, Anna Mayworm (associates)	HBO Max
2020-2021 (37th)	Love, Victor	Josh Einsohn, Tiffany Little Canfield, Conrad Woolfe (associates)	Hulu
2021-2022 (38th)
2021-2022 (38th)	Abbott Elementary	Wendy O'Brien	ABC
2021-2022 (38th)	Ghosts	Elizabeth Barnes, Tannis Vallely; Andrea Kenyon, Randi Wells (location casting)	CBS
2021-2022 (38th)	Julia	Sharon Bialy, Gohar Gazazyan; Lisa Lobel, Angela Peri (location casting); Stacia Kimler, Melissa Morris (associates)	HBO Max
2021-2022 (38th)	Only Murders in the Building	Bernard Telsey, Tiffany Little Canfield; Destiny Lilly (associate)	Hulu
2021-2022 (38th)	Reservation Dogs	Angelique Midthunder, Jennifer Schwalenberg; Chris Freihofer (location casting); Stacey Rice, Lisa Zambetti (associates)	FX
2021-2022 (38th)	The Sex Lives of College Girls	Elizabeth Barnes, Jennifer Euston	HBO Max
2022-2023 (39th)
2022-2023 (39th)	The Bear	Jeanie Bacharach, Mickie Paskal (Location Casting), Jennifer Rudnicke (Location Casting) AJ Links (Location Casting)	FX
2022-2023 (39th)	Jury Duty	Susie Farris, Walter Ware (Associate Casting Director)	Freevee
2022-2023 (39th)	A League of Their Own	Felicia Fasano, Donna Belajac (Location Casting), Katie Lantz (Associate Casting Director), Missy Finnell (Location Casting Director)	Prime Video
2022-2023 (39th)	Poker Face	Mary Vernieu, Bret Howe, Christine Kromer (Location Casting), Angelique Midthunder (Location Casting), Derek Hersey (Associate Casting Director)	Peacock
2022-2023 (39th)	Shrinking	Debby Romano, Brett Benner, Becca Burgess (Associate Casting Director)	Apple TV+
2023-2024 (40th)	Colin from Accounts	Kirsty McGregor	Paramount+
2023-2024 (40th)	Palm Royale	Kerry Barden, Paul Schnee; Roya Semnanian, Rachel Goldman (Associate Casting Directors)	Apple TV+
2023-2024 (40th)	Survival of the Thickest	Felicia Fasano; Katie Lantz (Associate Casting Director)	Netflix
2023-2024 (40th)	The Brothers Sun	Jenny Jue; Djinous Rowling, Tanya Giang (Associate Casting Directors)	Netflix
2023-2024 (40th)	The Gentlemen	Dan Hubbard	Netflix

== Networks with multiple nominations and awards ==
Network	Awards	Nominations
ABC	6	23
Amazon Prime Video	2	4
Apple TV+	1	1
CBS	0	16
Comedy Central	0	1
Fox	6	16
FX	1	3
HBO/HBO Max	1	17
Hulu	1	6
NBC	6	24
Netflix	2	12
Peacock	0	1
Showtime	0	5
TBS	0	1
The CW	1	3
The WB	0	2
TV Land	0	1
USA Network	0	1
