= 65th Primetime Creative Arts Emmy Awards =

2013 American television programming awards

- Date: September 15, 2013
- Location: Nokia Theatre; Los Angeles, California
- Presented by: Academy of Television Arts & Sciences
- Most awards: Behind the Candelabra (8)

Television/radio coverage
- Network: FXX

The 65th Annual Primetime Creative Arts Emmy Awards ceremony was held on September 15, 2013, at the Nokia Theatre in Downtown Los Angeles. The ceremony was held in conjunction with the annual Primetime Emmy Awards and is presented in recognition of technical and other similar achievements in American television programming, including guest acting roles. The ceremony was highlighted by eight Emmy wins for the HBO film Behind the Candelabra, as well as Bob Newhart's win for a guest appearance on The Big Bang Theory, his first Emmy win in a TV career spanning six decades. The ceremony was taped to air on Saturday, September 21, 2013, on FXX, one night before the live 65th Primetime Emmy Awards telecast on CBS.

== Winners and nominees ==
Winners are listed first and highlighted in bold:

=== Governor's Award ===
- **June Foray**

=== Programs ===
Programs
**Outstanding Reality Program**: **Undercover Boss (CBS)**; Antiques Roadshow (PBS); Deadliest Catch (Discovery Channel); Diners, Drive-Ins and Dives (Food Network); MythBusters (Discovery Channel); Shark Tank (ABC)	**Outstanding Variety, Music, or Comedy Special**: **The Kennedy Center Honors (CBS)**; 12-12-12: The Concert for Sandy Relief (Syndicated); Louis C.K.: Oh My God (HBO); Mel Brooks Strikes Back: With Mel Brooks and Alan Yentob (HBO); Saturday Night Live Weekend Update Thursday (Part One) (NBC)
**Outstanding Documentary or Nonfiction Series**: **American Masters (PBS)**; American Experience (Episode: "The Abolitionists") (PBS); The Men Who Built America (History); Through the Wormhole (Science); Vice (HBO)	**Outstanding Documentary or Nonfiction Special**: **Manhunt: The Search for Bin Laden (HBO)**; All the President's Men Revisited (Discovery Channel); American Experience (Episode: "Death and the Civil War") (PBS); Crossfire Hurricane (HBO); Ethel (HBO)
**Outstanding Animated Program**: **South Park (Episode: "Raising the Bar") (Comedy Central)**; Bob's Burgers (Episode: "O.T.: The Outside Toilet") (Fox); Kung Fu Panda: Legends of Awesomeness (Episode: "Enter the Dragon") (Nickelodeon); Regular Show (Episode: "The Christmas Special") (Cartoon Network); The Simpsons (Episode: "Treehouse of Horror XXIII") (Fox)	**Outstanding Short-Format Animated Program**: **Mickey Mouse (Episode: "Croissant de Triomphe") (Disney Channel)**; Adventure Time (Episode: "Simon & Marcy") (Cartoon Network); Clarence (Cartoon Network); Regular Show (Episode: "A Bunch of Full Grown Geese") (Cartoon Network); Robot Chicken (Episode: "Robot Chicken's ATM Christmas Special") (Cartoon Network)
**Outstanding Children's Program**: **Nick News with Linda Ellerbee: Forgotten But Not Gone: Kids, HIV & AIDS (Nickelodeon)**; Good Luck Charlie (Disney Channel); iCarly (Nickelodeon); The Weight of the Nation for Kids: Quiz Ed! (HBO); A YoungArts Masterclass (HBO)	**Outstanding Informational Series or Special**: **Anthony Bourdain: Parts Unknown (CNN)**; **Inside the Actors Studio (Bravo)**; Brain Games (Nat Geo); Oprah's Master Class (OWN); Stand Up to Cancer (Syndicated)
**Outstanding Special Class Program**: **66th Tony Awards (CBS)**; 70th Golden Globe Awards (NBC); 85th Academy Awards (ABC); 2012 Summer Olympics: Opening Ceremony (NBC); Rodgers & Hammerstein's Carousel (Live from Lincoln Center) (PBS)	**Outstanding Short-Format Live-Action Entertainment Program**: **Childrens Hospital (Cartoon Network)**; 30 Rock: The Webisodes (nbc.com); Between Two Ferns with Zach Galifianakis (Funny or Die); Burning Love (yahoo.com); The Daily Show Correspondents Explain (thedailyshow.com); Super Bowl XLVII Halftime Show starring Beyoncé (CBS)
**Outstanding Special Class – Short-Format Nonfiction Program**: **Remembering 9/11 (history.com)**; 30 Rock: The Final Season (nbc.com); Comedians in Cars Getting Coffee (Crackle); Jay Leno's Garage (jaylenosgarage.com); The Office: The Farewells (nbc.com); Top Chef: Last Chance Kitchen (bravotv.com)	**Outstanding Interactive Program**: **Night of Too Many Stars: America Comes Together for Autism Programs (comedycentral.com)**; Bravo's Top Chef Interactive Experience (bravotv.com); Game of Thrones: Season Three Enhanced Digital Experience (hbo.com); The Homeland SHO Sync Experience (sho.com); Killing Lincoln (natgeotv.com); The Team Coco Sync Multi-Screen Experience (teamcoco.com); The Walking Dead Story Sync (amctv.com)
**Exceptional Merit in Documentary Filmmaking**: **Mea Maxima Culpa: Silence in the House of God** (HBO)

=== Acting ===
Acting
**Outstanding Guest Actor in a Comedy Series**: **Bob Newhart as Arthur Jeffries / Professor Proton on The Big Bang Theory (Episode: "The Proton Resurgence") (CBS)**; Louis C.K. as Various Characters on Saturday Night Live (Episode: "Host: Louis C.K.") (NBC); Bobby Cannavale as Dr. Mike Cruz on Nurse Jackie (Episode: "Walk of Shame") (Showtime); Will Forte as Paul L'Astnamé on 30 Rock (Episode: "My Whole Life Is Thunder") (NBC); Nathan Lane as Pepper Saltzman on Modern Family (Episode: "A Slight at the Opera") (ABC); Justin Timberlake as Various Characters on Saturday Night Live (Episode: "Host: Justin Timberlake") (NBC)	**Outstanding Guest Actress in a Comedy Series**: **Melissa Leo as Laurie on Louie (Episode: "Telling Jokes/Set Up") (FX)**; Dot-Marie Jones as Shannon Beiste on Glee (Episode: "Shooting Star") (Fox); Melissa McCarthy as Various Characters on Saturday Night Live (Episode: "Host: Melissa McCarthy") (NBC); Molly Shannon as Eileen Foliente on Enlightened (Episode: "The Ghost Is Seen") (HBO); Elaine Stritch as Colleen Donaghy on 30 Rock (Episode: "My Whole Life Is Thunder") (NBC); Kristen Wiig as Various Characters on Saturday Night Live (Episode: "Host: Kristen Wiig") (NBC)
**Outstanding Guest Actor in a Drama Series**: **Dan Bucatinsky as James Novack on Scandal (Episode: "Nobody Likes Babies") (ABC)**; Michael J. Fox as Louis Canning on The Good Wife (Episode: "Boom De Ya Da") (CBS); Rupert Friend as Peter Quinn on Homeland (Episode: "Q&A") (Showtime); Harry Hamlin as Jim Cutler on Mad Men (Episode: "A Tale of Two Cities") (AMC); Nathan Lane as Clarke Hayden on The Good Wife (Episode: "I Fought the Law") (CBS); Robert Morse as Bert Cooper on Mad Men (Episode: "For Immediate Release") (AMC)	**Outstanding Guest Actress in a Drama Series**: **Carrie Preston as Elsbeth Tascioni on The Good Wife (Episode: "Je Nai Says What?") (CBS)**; Linda Cardellini as Sylvia Rosen on Mad Men (Episode: "Man With a Plan") (AMC); Joan Cusack as Sheila Jackson on Shameless (Episode: "A Long Way From Home") (Showtime); Jane Fonda as Leona Lansing on The Newsroom (Episode: "The 112th Congress") (HBO); Margo Martindale as Claudia on The Americans (Episode: "The Colonel") (FX); Diana Rigg as Lady Olenna Tyrell on Game of Thrones (Episode: "And Now His Watch Is Ended") (HBO)
**Outstanding Voice-Over Performance**: **Lily Tomlin as Narrator on An Apology to Elephants (HBO)**; Bob Bergen as Porky Pig on The Looney Tunes Show (Episode: "We're in Big Truffle") (Cartoon Network); Alex Borstein as Lois Griffin and Tricia Takanawa on Family Guy (Episode: "Lois Comes Out of Her Shell") (Fox); Sam Elliott as Narrator on Robot Chicken (Episode: "Hurled from a Helicopter into a Speeding Train") (Adult Swim); Seth Green as Various Characters on Robot Chicken DC Comics Special (Adult Swim); Seth MacFarlane as Peter Griffin, Stewie Griffin, and Brian Griffin on Family Guy (Episode: "Brian's Play") (Fox)

=== Art Direction ===
Art Direction
**Outstanding Art Direction for a Multi-Camera Series**: **Masterchef (Episode: "Episode 3-20") (Fox)**; 2 Broke Girls (Episodes: "And the Bear Truth"; "And Not So Sweet Charity"; "And the Silent Partner") (CBS); The Big Bang Theory (Episodes: "The Date Night Variable"; "The Bakersfield Expedition"; "The Love Spell Potential") (CBS); How I Met Your Mother (Episodes: "Farhampton"; "P.S. I Love You"; "The Final Page: Part Two") (CBS); Two and a Half Men (Episodes: "Avoid the Chinese Mustard"; "Grab a Feather and Get in Line"; "My Bodacious Vidalia") (CBS)	**Outstanding Art Direction for a Single-Camera Series**: **Boardwalk Empire (Episode: "Sunday Best", "Two Impostors" and Margate Sands") (HBO)**; The Borgias (Episode: "Siblings") (Showtime); Downton Abbey (Episode: "Episode Seven") (PBS); Game of Thrones (Episode: "Valar Dohaeris") (HBO); True Blood (Episode: 'Whatever I Am, You Made Me") (HBO)
**Outstanding Art Direction for a Miniseries or Movie**: **Behind the Candelabra (HBO)**; American Horror Story: Asylum (FX); Phil Spector (HBO); Seal Team Six: The Raid on Osama Bin Laden (NGC)	**Outstanding Art Direction for Variety or Nonfiction Programming**: **2012 Summer Olympics: Opening Ceremony (NBC)**; **Saturday Night Live (Episodes: "Host: Justin Timberlake", "Host: Martin Short" and "Host: Ben Affleck) (NBC)**; 85th Academy Awards (ABC); Dancing with the Stars (Episode: "Episode 1608A") (ABC); The Voice (Episodes: "Battle Rounds (Part 1)"; "The Live Shows"; "Semi-Finals, The Blind Auditions: Part 1") (NBC)

=== Casting ===
Casting
**Outstanding Casting for a Comedy Series**: **30 Rock - Jennifer McNamara-Shroff, Katja Blichfeld, and Jessica Daniels (NBC)**; Girls - Jennifer Euston (HBO); Modern Family - Jeff Greenberg(ABC); Nurse Jackie - Julie Tucker and Ross Meyerson (Showtime); Veep - Allison Jones, Pat Moran, and Meredith Tucker (HBO)	**Outstanding Casting for a Drama Series**: **House of Cards - Laray Mayfield and Julie Schubert (Netflix)**; Downton Abbey - Jill Trevellick (PBS); Game of Thrones - Nina Gold and Robert Sterne (HBO); The Good Wife - Mark Saks (CBS); Homeland - Judy Henderson, Craig Fincannon and Lisa Mae Fincannon (Showtime)
**Outstanding Casting for a Miniseries, Movie, or a Special**: **Behind the Candelabra - Carmen Cuba (HBO)**; American Horror Story: Asylum - Robert J. Ulrich and Eric Dawson (FX); The Hour - Jill Trevellick (BBC America); Political Animals - David Rubin and Diane Heery (USA); Top of the Lake - Kirsty McGregor and Tina Cleary (Sundance Channel)

=== Cinematography ===
Cinematography
**Outstanding Cinematography for a Multi-Camera Series**: **How I Met Your Mother (Episode: "The Final Page: Part Two") (CBS)**; 2 Broke Girls (Episode: "And the Psychic Shakedown") (CBS); The Exes (Episode: "Pirates of the Care of Eden") (TV Land); Mike & Molly (Episode: "Molly's Birthday") (CBS); Two and a Half Men (Episode: "Grab a Feather and Get in Line") (CBS)	**Outstanding Cinematography for a Single-Camera Series**: **House of Cards (Episode: "Chapter 1") (Netflix)**; Boardwalk Empire (Episode: "Margate Sands") (HBO); Breaking Bad (Episode: "Gliding Over All") (AMC); Game of Thrones (Episode: "Mhysa") (HBO); Homeland (Episode: "Beirut Is Back") (Showtime); Mad Men (Episode: "The Doorway") (AMC)
**Outstanding Cinematography for a Miniseries or Movie**: **Top of the Lake (Episode: "Part 1") (Sundance Channel)**; American Horror Story: Asylum (Episode: "I Am Anne Frank: Part 2") (FX); Behind the Candelabra (HBO); The Girl (HBO); Parade's End (Episode: "Part Five") (HBO)	**Outstanding Cinematography for Nonfiction Programming**: **Anthony Bourdain: Parts Unknown (Episode: "Myanmar") (CNN)**; Ethel (HBO); Manhunt: The Inside Story of the Hunt for Bin Laden (HBO); Mea Maxima Culpa: Silence in the House of God (HBO); The Men Who Built America (Episode: "A New War Begins") (History)
**Outstanding Cinematography for Reality Programming**: **Deadliest Catch (Episode: "Mutiny on the Bering Sea") (Discovery Channel)**; The Amazing Race (Episode: "Be Safe and Don't Hit a Cow") (CBS); Project Runway (Episode: "A Times Square Anniversary Party") (Lifetime); Survivor (Episode: "Create a Little Chaos") (CBS); Top Chef (Episode: "Glacial Gourmand") (Bravo)

=== Commercial ===
Commercial
**Outstanding Commercial**
- **"Inspired" (Canon)**
  - "The Chase" (Grey Poupon)
  - "Jess Time" (Google Chrome)
  - "Jogger" (Nike)

=== Costuming ===
Costuming
**Outstanding Costumes for a Series**: **The Borgias (Episode: "The Gunpowder Plot") (Showtime)**; Boardwalk Empire (Episode: "Resolution") (HBO); Downton Abbey (Episode: "Episode Four") (PBS); Game of Thrones (Episode: "Walk of Punishment") (HBO); Once Upon a Time (Episode: "Queen of Hearts") (ABC)	**Outstanding Costumes for a Miniseries, Movie, or Special**: **Behind the Candelabra (HBO)**; American Horror Story: Asylum (Episode: "Madness Ends") (FX); The Girl (HBO); Killing Lincoln (Nat Geo); Parade's End (Episode: "Part Three") (HBO); Phil Spector (HBO)

=== Directing ===
Directing
**Outstanding Directing for Nonfiction Programming**: **Robert Trachtenberg for American Masters (Episode: "Mel Brooks: Make a Noise") (PBS)**; Alex Gibney for Mea Maxima Culpa: Silence in the House of God (HBO); Rory Kennedy for Ethel (HBO); Michael Simon for Survivor (Episode: "Live Finale and Reunion (Philippines)") (CBS); Glenn Weiss for Survivor (Episode: "Live Finale and Reunion (Caramoan: Fans vs. Favorites)") (CBS)	**Outstanding Directing for a Variety Special**: **Louis J. Horvitz for The Kennedy Center Honors (CBS)**; Louis C.K. for Louis C.K.: Oh My God (HBO); Michael Dempsy for 12-12-12: The Concert for Sandy Relief (Syndicated); Bucky Gunts and Hamish Hamilton for 2012 Summer Olympics: Opening Ceremony (NBC); Don Mischer for 85th Academy Awards (ABC)

=== Hairstyling ===
Hairstyling
**Outstanding Hairstyling for a Single-Camera Series**: **Boardwalk Empire (Episode: "Resolution") (HBO)**; Downton Abbey (Episode: "Episode Four") (PBS); The Borgias (Episode: "The Wolf and the Lamb") (Showtime); Game of Thrones (Episode: "Second Sons") (HBO); Mad Men (Episode: "The Doorway") (AMC)	**Outstanding Hairstyling for a Multi-Camera Series or Special**: **Saturday Night Live (Episode: "Host: Jennifer Lawrence") (NBC)**; 85th Academy Awards (ABC); The Big Bang Theory (Episode: "The Bakersfield Expedition") (CBS); Dancing with the Stars (Episode: "Episode 1608") (ABC); The Voice (Episode: "The Live Shows: Part 1") (NBC)
**Outstanding Hairstyling for a Miniseries or Movie**: **Behind the Candelabra (HBO)**; American Horror Story: Asylum (FX); Liz & Dick (Lifetime); Phil Spector (HBO); Political Animals (USA); Ring of Fire (Lifetime)

=== Hosting ===
Hosting
**Outstanding Host for a Reality or Reality-Competition Program**
- **Heidi Klum and Tim Gunn for Project Runway (Lifetime)**
  - Tom Bergeron for Dancing with the Stars (ABC)
  - Anthony Bourdain for The Taste (ABC)
  - Cat Deeley for So You Think You Can Dance (Fox)
  - Ryan Seacrest for American Idol (Fox)
  - Betty White for Betty White's Off Their Rockers (NBC)

=== Lighting Design / Direction ===
Lighting Design / Direction
**Outstanding Lighting Design / Lighting Direction for a Variety Series**: **The Voice (Episode: "Live Final Performances") (NBC)**; American Idol (Episode: "Finale") (Fox); Dancing with the Stars (Episode: "Episode 1605") (ABC); Saturday Night Live (Episode: "Host: Martin Short") (NBC); So You Think You Can Dance (Episode: "Season 9 Finale") (Fox)	**Outstanding Lighting Design / Lighting Direction for a Variety Special**: **Super Bowl XLVII Halftime Show starring Beyoncé (CBS)**; 55th Grammy Awards (CBS); 85th Academy Awards (ABC); 2012 Summer Olympics: Opening Ceremony (NBC); 2013 Rock and Roll Hall of Fame: Induction Ceremony (HBO); Andrea Bocelli: Love in Portofino (Great Performances) (PBS)

=== Main Title Design ===
Main Title Design
**Outstanding Main Title Design**
- **Da Vinci's Demons (Starz)**
  - American Horror Story: Asylum (FX)
  - Elementary (CBS)
  - Halo 4: Forward Unto Dawn (machinima.com)
  - The Newsroom (HBO)
  - Vikings (History)

=== Make-up ===
Make-up
**Outstanding Make-up for a Single-Camera Series (Non-Prosthetic)**: **Game of Thrones (Episode: "Kissed by Fire") (HBO)**; Boardwalk Empire (Episode: "Resolution") (HBO); The Borgias (Episode: '"The Gunpowder Plot") (Showtime); Glee (Episode: "Guilty Pleasures") (Fox); Mad Men (Episode: "The Doorway") (AMC); Once Upon a Time (Episode: "The Evil Queen") (ABC)	**Outstanding Make-up for a Multi-Camera Series or Special (Non-Prosthetic)**: **Saturday Night Live (Episode: "Host: Justin Timberlake") (NBC)**; 85th Academy Awards (ABC); Dancing with the Stars (Episode: "Episode 1603") (ABC); How I Met Your Mother (Episode: "P.S. I Love You") (CBS); Key and Peele (Episode: "Episode 209") (Comedy Central)
**Outstanding Make-up for a Miniseries or Movie (Non-Prosthetic)**: **Behind the Candelabra (HBO)**; American Horror Story: Asylum (FX); Liz & Dick (Lifetime); Phil Spector (HBO); Ring of Fire (Lifetime)	**Outstanding Prosthetic Make-up for a Series, Miniseries, Movie, or Special**: **Behind the Candelabra (HBO)**; American Horror Story: Asylum (FX); Game of Thrones (Episode: "Valar Dohaeris") (HBO); Saturday Night Live (Episode: "Host: Jennifer Lawrence") (NBC); The Walking Dead (Episode: "This Sorrowful Life") (AMC)

=== Music ===
Music
**Outstanding Music Composition for a Series (Original Dramatic Score)**: **John Lunn for Downton Abbey (Episode: "Episode Six") (PBS)**; Jeff Beal for House of Cards (Episode: "Chapter 1") (Netflix); Robert Duncan for Last Resort (Episode: "Captain") (ABC); Charlie Mole for Mr Selfridge (Episode: "Episode 1") (PBS); Trevor Morris for The Borgias (Episode: "The Prince") (Showtime); David Schwartz for Arrested Development (Episode: "Flight of the Phoenix") (Netflix)	**Outstanding Music Composition for a Miniseries, Movie, or Special (Original Dramatic Score)**: **Mychael Danna for World Without End (Episode: "Medieval Life and Death") (ReelzChannel)**; Lorne Balfe for Restless (Episode: "Part Two") (Sundance Channel); Dirk Brossé for Parade's End (Episode: "Part Five") (HBO); Ivor Guest and Robert Logan for Mea Maxima Culpa: Silence in the House of God (HBO); Philip Miller for The Girl (HBO); Anton Sanko for Ring of Fire (Lifetime)
**Outstanding Music Direction**: **66th Tony Awards (CBS)**; 85th Academy Awards (ABC); Christmas in Washington (TNT); The Kennedy Center Honors (CBS); Rodgers & Hammerstein's Carousel (Live from Lincoln Center) (PBS)	**Outstanding Original Music and Lyrics**: **66th Tony Awards (Song: "If I Had Time") (CBS)**; 30 Rock (Episode: "Hogcock!" / "Last Lunch"; Song: "Rural Juror") (NBC); Nashville (Episode: "I'll Never Get Out of This World Alive"; Song: "Nothing in This World Will Ever Break My Heart Again") (ABC); The Neighbors (Episode: "Sing Like a Larry Bird"; Song: "More or Less the Kind of Thing You May or May Not Possibly See on Broadway") (ABC); Smash (Episode: "The Bells and Whistles"; Song: "I Hear Your Voice in a Dream") (NBC); Smash (Episode: "The Parents"; Song: "Hang the Moon") (NBC)
**Outstanding Original Main Title Theme Music**: **Bear McCreary for Da Vinci's Demons (Starz)**; Nathan Barr for The Americans (FX); Nathan Barr for Hemlock Grove (Netflix); Jeff Beal for House of Cards (Netflix); Sean Callery for Elementary (CBS); Brian Keane for Copper (BBC America)

=== Picture Editing ===
Picture Editing
**Outstanding Single-Camera Picture Editing for a Drama Series**: **Breaking Bad (Episode: "Gliding Over All") (AMC)**; Breaking Bad (Episode: "Dead Freight") (AMC); Game of Thrones (Episode: "The Rains of Castamere") (HBO); House of Cards (Episode: "Chapter 1") (Netflix); Mad Men (Episode: "Collaborators") (AMC)	**Outstanding Single-Camera Picture Editing for a Comedy Series**: **The Office (Episode: "Finale") (NBC)**; 30 Rock (Episode: "Hogcock!" / "Last Lunch") (NBC); Arrested Development (Episode: "Flight of the Phoenix") (Netflix); Louie (Episode: "Daddy's Girlfriend Part 2") (FX); Modern Family (Episode: "Party Crasher") (ABC)
**Outstanding Single-Camera Picture Editing for a Miniseries or Movie**: **Behind the Candelabra (HBO)**; American Horror Story: Asylum (Episode: "Nor'easter") (FX); Killing Lincoln (Nat Geo); Phil Spector (HBO); Top of the Lake (Episode: "Part 5") (Sundance Channel)	**Outstanding Multi-Camera Picture Editing for a Comedy Series**: **How I Met Your Mother (Episode: "P.S. I Love You") (CBS)**; The Big Bang Theory (Episode: "The Love Spell Potential") (CBS); The Colbert Report (Episode: "Episode 9082") (Comedy Central); Conan (Episode: "Occupy Conan") (TBS); Hot in Cleveland (Episode: "Magic Diet Candy") (TV Land)
**Outstanding Picture Editing for Short-Form Segments and Variety Specials**: **The Daily Show with Jon Stewart (Episode: "Episode 18092"; Segment: "Australia & Gun Control's Aftermath: Part III") (Comedy Central)**; 2012 Summer Olympics: Opening Ceremony (Segment: "Happy & Glorious") (NBC); The Colbert Report (Episode: "Episode 9083"; Segment: "CGI University") (Comedy Central); Louis C.K.: Oh My God (HBO); Saturday Night Live (Episode: "Host: Louis C.K."; Segment: "Lincoln") (NBC)	**Outstanding Picture Editing for Nonfiction Programming**: **Mea Maxima Culpa: Silence in the House of God (HBO)**; American Masters (Episode: "Mel Brooks: Make a Noise") (PBS); Crossfire Hurricane (HBO); Ethel (HBO); Richard Pryor: Omit the Logic (Showtime)
**Outstanding Picture Editing for Reality Programming**: **Deadliest Catch (Episode: "Mutiny on the Bering Sea") (Discovery Channel)**; The Amazing Race (Episode: "Be Safe and Don't Hit a Cow") (CBS); Project Runway (Episode: "Europe, Here We Come") (Lifetime); Project Runway (Episode: "A Times Square Anniversary Party") (Lifetime); Survivor (Episode: "Zipping Over the Cuckoo's Nest") (CBS)

=== Sound ===
Sound
**Outstanding Sound Editing for a Series**: **Boardwalk Empire (Episode: "The Milkmaid's Lot") (HBO)**; Breaking Bad (Episode: "Dead Freight") (AMC); Game of Thrones (Episode: "And Now His Watch Is Ended") (HBO); Nikita (Episode: "Aftermath") (The CW); Vikings (Episode: "Trial") (History)	**Outstanding Sound Editing for a Miniseries, Movie, or Special**: **American Horror Story: Asylum (Episode: "Welcome to Briarcliff") (FX)**; Battlestar Galactica: Blood & Chrome (Syfy); The Bible (Episode: "Beginnings") (History); Seal Team Six: The Raid on Osama Bin Laden (NGC); World Without End (Episode: "Medieval Life and Death") (ReelzChannel)
**Outstanding Sound Editing for Nonfiction Programming (Single or Multi-Camera)**: **The Men Who Built America (Episode: "Bloody Battles") (History)**; The Amazing Race (Episode: "Be Safe and Don't Hit a Cow") (CBS); Crossfire Hurricane (HBO); The Dust Bowl (Episode: "The Great Plow Up") (PBS); History of the Eagles (Showtime); Survivor (Episode: "Create a Little Chaos") (CBS)	**Outstanding Sound Mixing for a Comedy or Drama Series (One Hour)**: **Boardwalk Empire (Episode: "The Milkmaid's Lot") (HBO)**; Breaking Bad (Episode: "Dead Freight") (AMC); Game of Thrones (Episode: "And Now His Watch Is Ended") (HBO); Homeland (Episode: "Beirut Is Back") (Showtime); Mad Men (Episode: "The Flood") (AMC)
**Outstanding Sound Mixing for a Miniseries or Movie**: **Behind the Candelabra (HBO)**; American Horror Story: Asylum (Episode: "Welcome to Briarcliff") (FX); Battlestar Galactica: Blood & Chrome (Syfy); The Bible (Episode: "Beginnings") (History); Phil Spector (HBO)	**Outstanding Sound Mixing for a Comedy or Drama Series (Half-Hour) and Animation**: **Nurse Jackie (Episode: "Teachable Moments") (Showtime)**; 30 Rock (Episode: "Mazel Tov, Dummies!") (NBC); Modern Family (Episode: "My Hero") (ABC); The Office (Episode: "Finale") (NBC); Parks and Recreation (Episode: "Leslie and Ben") (NBC)
**Outstanding Sound Mixing for a Variety Series or Special**: **55th Grammy Awards (CBS)**; 85th Academy Awards (ABC); American Idol ("Finale") (Fox); The Colbert Report (Episode: "Episode 8137B") (Comedy Central); The Daily Show with Jon Stewart (Episode: "Episode 17153") (Comedy Central)	**Outstanding Sound Mixing for Nonfiction Programming**: **History of the Eagles (Showtime)**; The Amazing Race (Episode: "Be Safe and Don't Hit a Cow") (CBS); Anthony Bourdain: Parts Unknown (Episode: "Myanmar") (CNN); Crossfire Hurricane (HBO); Deadliest Catch (Episode: "Mutiny on the Bering Sea") (Discovery Channel); Survivor (Episode: "Create a Little Chaos") (CBS)

=== Special Visual Effects ===
Special Visual Effects
**Outstanding Special Visual Effects**: **Game of Thrones (Episode: "Valar Dohaeris") (HBO)**; Battlestar Galactica: Blood & Chrome (Syfy); Defiance (Episode: "Pilot") (Syfy); Falling Skies (Episode: "Worlds Apart") (TNT); Hemlock Grove (Episode: "Children of the Night") (Netflix); Last Resort (Episode: "Captain") (ABC)	**Outstanding Special Visual Effects in a Supporting Role**: **Banshee (Episode: "Pilot") (Cinemax)**; Boardwalk Empire (Episode: "The Pony") (HBO); The Borgias (Episode: "The Prince") (Showtime); Da Vinci's Demons (Episode: "The Lovers") (Starz); Revolution (Episode: "Pilot") (NBC); Vikings (Episode: "Dispossessed") (History)

=== Stunt Coordination ===
Stunt Coordination
**Outstanding Stunt Coordination for a Comedy Series or a Variety Program**: **Supah Ninjas (Nickelodeon)**; It's Always Sunny in Philadelphia (FX); Modern Family (ABC); Workaholics (Comedy Central)	**Outstanding Stunt Coordination for a Drama Series, Miniseries or Movie**: **Revolution (Episode: "Nobody's Fault But Mine") (NBC)**; Blue Bloods (Episode: "Secrets & Lies") (CBS); NCIS (Episode: "Revenge") (CBS); Southland (Episode: "Bleed Out") (TNT)

=== Technical Direction ===
Technical Direction
**Outstanding Technical Direction, Camerawork, Video Control for a Series**: **The Big Bang Theory (Episode: "The Higgs Boson Observation") (CBS)**; The Daily Show with Jon Stewart (Episode: "Episode 18020") (Comedy Central); Dancing with the Stars (Episode: "Episode 1610A") (ABC); Jimmy Kimmel Live! (Episode: "Episode 12-1776") (ABC); Saturday Night Live (Episode: "Host: Martin Short") (NBC); The Voice (Episode: "Live Final Performances") (NBC)	**Outstanding Technical Direction, Camerawork, Video Control for a Miniseries, Movie, or Special**: **66th Tony Awards (CBS)**; 85th Academy Awards (ABC); 2013 Rock and Roll Hall of Fame: Induction Ceremony (HBO); The Kennedy Center Honors (CBS); Super Bowl XLVII Halftime Show starring Beyoncé (CBS)

=== Writing ===
Writing
**Outstanding Writing for Nonfiction Programming**: **Mea Maxima Culpa: Silence in the House of God (HBO)**; Anthony Bourdain: Parts Unknown: Libya (CNN); The Dust Bowl: The Great Plow Up (PBS); Ethel (HBO); The Men Who Built America: A New War Begins (History)	**Outstanding Writing for a Variety Special**: **Louis C.K.: Oh My God (HBO)**; 70th Golden Globe Awards (NBC); Night of Too Many Stars: America Comes Together for Autism Programs (Comedy Central); Saturday Night Live Weekend Update Thursday (Part One) (NBC); 66th Tony Awards (CBS)

== Presenters ==
- Scott Bakula
- Mark Burnett
- Linda Cardellini
- Joelle Carter
- Mark Cuban
- Roma Downey
- Rupert Friend
- Pamela Fryman
- Gilbert Gottfried
- Nolan Gould
- Lori Greiner
- Tim Gunn
- Dan Harmon
- Neil Patrick Harris
- Robert Herjavec
- Jamie Hyneman
- Daymond John
- Heidi Klum
- Joel McHale
- Katharine McPhee
- Margo Martindale
- Rickey Minor
- Jon Murray
- Kevin O'Leary
- Chris Parnell
- Adam Savage
- Robert Smigel
- Yeardley Smith
- Cobie Smulders
- Triumph the Insult Comic Dog
- Matthew Weiner
- Jerry Weintraub
- McKenzie Westmore
- Graham Yost
