= Jennifer Rudnicke =

American casting director

- Education: Illinois State University
- Occupation: Casting director
- Years active: 1993–present

Jennifer Rudnicke is an American casting director. She won two Primetime Emmy Awards and was nominated for another one in the category Outstanding Casting for her work on the television program The Bear.
