= 33rd Artios Awards =

Annual US film and television award

- Date: January 18, 2018
- Location: Stage 48, New York City, United States; Beverly Hilton Hotel, Los Angeles, United States
- Country: United States
- Presented by: Casting Society of America
- Hosted by: Bridget Everett (New York City); Tig Notaro (Los Angeles)
- Website: www.castingsociety.com/awards/artios

The 33rd Artios Awards, presented by the Casting Society of America, honored the best originality, creativity and the contribution of casting to the overall quality of a film, television, theatre and short-form projects. The ceremony was held on January 18, 2018, in simultaneous ceremonies at the Beverly Hilton Hotel, Los Angeles and Stage 48 in New York City. The New York City ceremony was hosted by Bridget Everett, while Tig Notaro hosted the Los Angeles ceremony.

The television and theatre nominations were announced on September 28, 2017. The film nominations were announced on January 2, 2018.

== Winners and nominees ==
Winners are listed first and highlighted in boldface:

=== Film ===
**Big Budget – Comedy**: **The Greatest Showman – Bernard Telsey, Tiffany Little Canfield; Additional Casting: Rori Bergman; Associate: Patrick Goodwin**; Beauty and the Beast – Lucy Bevan, Bernard Telsey, Tiffany Little Canfield; Guardians of the Galaxy Vol. 2 – Sarah Halley Finn; Location Casting: Tara Feldstein Bennett, Chase Paris; Logan Lucky – Carmen Cuba; Location Casting: Tara Feldstein Bennett, Chase Paris; Associate: Charley Medigovich; Wonder – Deborah Aquila, Tricia Wood; Location Casting: Kara Eide, Kris Woz	**Big Budget – Drama**: **Dunkirk – John Papsidera**; Baby Driver – Francine Maisler; Location Casting: Meagan Lewis; Detroit – Victoria Thomas; New York Casting: Richard Hicks; Location Casting: Carolyn Pickman; Associate: Scotty Anderson; The Post – Ellen Lewis, Rori Bergman; Associate: Kate Sprance, Karlee Fomalont; Wonder Woman – Lora Kennedy, Kristy Carlson, Lucinda Syson; Associate: Jeanette Benzie
**Studio or Independent – Comedy**: **Lady Bird – Jordan Thaler, Heidi Griffiths**; Battle of the Sexes – Justine Arteta, Kim Davis-Wagner; The Disaster Artist – Rich Delia; Get Out – Terri Taylor; Location Casting: Elizabeth Coulon; Associate: Sarah Domeier; Girls Trip – Mary Vernieu, Michelle Wade Byrd; Location Casting: Elizabeth Coulon; I, Tonya – Mary Vernieu, Lindsay Graham; Location Casting: Tara Feldstein Bennett, Chase Paris	**Studio or Independent – Drama**: **Three Billboards Outside Ebbing, Missouri – Sarah Halley Finn; Location Casting: Meagan Lewis; Associate: Hannah Cooper**; Gifted – David Rubin; Location Casting: Jackie Burch; Associate: Melissa Pryor; The Florida Project – Carmen Cuba; Location Casting: Mark Mullen; The Shape of Water – Robin D. Cook; Associate: Jonathan Oliviera; Split – Douglas Aibel; Location Casting: Diane Heery, Jason Loftus; Associate: Henry Russell Bergstein
**Low Budget – Comedy or Drama**: **Beach Rats – Susan Shopmaker**; Crown Heights – Avy Kaufman; It Comes at Night – Avy Kaufman; My Cousin Rachel – Fiona Weir; To the Bone – Rich Delia	**Animation**: **Coco – Kevin Reher, Natalie Lyon, Carla Hool**; Cars 3 – Kevin Reher, Natalie Lyon; The Nut Job 2: Nutty by Nature – Linda Lamontagne; Rock Dog – Jen Rudin

=== Television ===
**Television Series – Comedy**: **Veep – Dorian Frankel, Sibby Kirchgessner; Associate: Marlise Gunzenhauser**; Black-ish – Alexis Frank Koczara, Christine Smith Shevchenko; Crazy Ex-Girlfriend – Felicia Fasano, Venus Kanani; Associate: Tara Nostramo; Girls – Jennifer Eustons; Silicon Valley – Jeanne McCarthy, Nicole Abellera Hallman, Leslie Woo; Transparent – Eyde Belasco	**Television Series – Drama**: **Black Mirror – Jina Jay; Location Casting: Henry Russell Bergstein**; The Affair – Ross Meyerson, Julie Tucker; The Americans – Rori Bergman; Bloodline – Debra Zane, Shayna Markowitz; Location Casting: Lori Wyman; Associate: Marie-Therese Verbruggen, Erin Fragetta; Homeland – Judy Henderson; Associate: Kimberly Graham
**Television Pilot and First Season – Comedy**: **Atlanta – Alexa L. Fogel; Location Casting: Tara Feldstein Bennett, Chase Paris; Associate: Kathryn Zamora-Benson**; Better Things – Felicia Fasano; Associate: Tara Nostramo; Dear White People – Kim Coleman; I Love Dick – Eyde Belasco; Insecure – Victoria Thomas	**Television Pilot and First Season – Drama**: **The Handmaid's Tale – Sharon Bialy, Sherry Thomas, Russell Scott; Location Casting: Robin D. Cook; Associate: Jonathan Oliveira**; 13 Reasons Why – Kerry Barden, Paul Schnee, Barbara Fiorentino; Location Casting: Nina Henninger; Associate: Joey Montenarello, Terese Classen; The Crown – Nina Gold, Robert Sterne; This Is Us – Bernard Telsey, Tiffany Little Canfield, Josh Einsohn; Associate: Ryan Bernard Tymensky; Stranger Things – Carmen Cuba; Location Casting: Tara Feldstein Bennett, Chase Paris; Associate: Wittney Horton; Westworld – John Papsidera; Associate: Deanna Brigidi
**Limited Series**: **Big Little Lies – David Rubin; Associate: Melissa Pryor**; Fargo – Rachel Tenner; Location Casting: Jackie Lind, Stephanie Gorin; Associate: Charlene Lee; Feud: Bette and Joan – Robert J. Ulrich, Eric Dawson, Carol Kritzer; Associate: Jennifer K.M. Treadwell; The Night Of – Avy Kaufman, Sabrina Hyman; Associate: Susanne Scheel; When We Rise – Sheila Jaffe, Gail Goldberg; Location Casting: Sean Cossey, JJ Ogilvy, Nina Henninger	**Film, Non-Theatrical Release**: **The Wizard of Lies – Ellen Chenoweth; Associate: Susanne Scheel**; Hairspray Live! – Bernard Telsey, Abbie Brady-Dalton; Associate: Cesar A. Rocha; The Immortal Life of Henrietta Lacks – Cindy Tolan; Location Casting: Meagan Lewis; Associate: Daniel Cabeza; Killing Reagan – Junie Lowry Johnson, Libby Goldstein; Location Casting: Mark Fincannon, Craig Fincannon, Lisa Mae Fincannon; Associate: Monica Kelly; The Rocky Horror Picture Show: Let's Do the Time Warp Again – Robert J. Ulrich, Eric Dawson, Carol Kritzer; Location Casting: Stephanie Gorin; Associate: Alex Newman
**Children's Pilot and Series (Live Action)**: **School of Rock – Suzanne Goddard-Smythe; Associate: Ty Harman**; Bunk'd – Howard Meltzer; Girl Meets World – Sally Stiner, Barbie Block; Julie's Greenroom – Bernard Telsey; Associate: Conrad Woolfe; Nicky, Ricky, Dicky & Dawn – Danielle Aufiero, Amber Horn; Associate: Steven Tylor O’Connor	**Television Animation**: **BoJack Horseman – Linda Lamontagne**; American Dad! – Linda Lamontagne; Bob's Burgers – Julie Ashton-Barson; Family Guy – Linda Lamontagne; Peanuts – Matthew Jon Beck
**Reality Series**: **Born This Way – Sasha Alpert**; Are You the One? – Damon Furberg, Heather Allyn; Project Runway – Sasha Alpert; Real World – Sasha Alpert; True Life: We Are Transitioning – Tony Miros

=== Short-Form Projects ===
**Short Film**: **Perfect Roast Potatoes – Rich Mento**; Crowbar Smile – Eyde Belasco; Plea – Marin Hope; Public Speaking – Adrienne Stern; The Sub – Amanda Lenker Doyle	**Short Form Series**: **Confess – Fern Champion, Sharon Lieblein; Associate: Troy Daniel Smith**; Now We're Talking – Alexis Frank Koczara; Party Girl – Nickole Doro, Shayna Sherwood; Single by 30 – Sherrie Henderson, Romy Stutman; Associate: Vanessa Knight; Tales of Titans – Amanda Lenker Doyle, Chrissy Fiorilli-Ellington; Tween Fest – Amanda Lenker Doyle

=== Theatre ===
**New York Broadway Theatre – Comedy or Drama**: **A Doll's House, Part 2 – David Caparelliotis, Lauren Port**; Heisenberg – Nancy Piccione; Indecent – Tara Rubin; Associate: Felicia Rudolph; Oslo – Daniel Swee; Sweat – Heidi Griffiths, Jordan Thaler	**New York Broadway Theatre – Musical**: **Come from Away – Rachel Hoffman**; Charlie and the Chocolate Factory – Rachel Hoffman; Groundhog Day – Jim Carnahan; Associate: Jillian Cimini; Natasha, Pierre & The Great Comet of 1812 – Duncan Stewart, Benton Whitley; Associate: Andrea Zee; War Paint – Craig Burns, Bernard Telsey
**New York Broadway Theatre – Revival, Comedy or Drama**: **Jitney – David Caparelliotis, Nancy Piccione**; The Front Page – David Caparelliotis, Lauren Port; The Glass Menagerie – David Caparelliotis, Lauren Port; The Little Foxes – David Caparelliotis, Kelly Gillespie; Six Degrees of Separation – Daniel Swee	**New York Broadway Theatre – Revival, Musical**: **Hello, Dolly! – Craig Burns, Bernard Tesley**; Falsettos – Tara Rubin, Eric Woodall; Associate: Kaitlin Shaw, Claire Burke; Miss Saigon – Tara Rubin, Merri Sugarman; Associate: Claire Burke; Sunday in the Park with George – Carrie Gardner, Stephen Kopel; Sunset Boulevard – Tara Rubin, Eric Woodall
**New York Theatre – Comedy or Musical**: **The Band's Visit – Tara Rubin**; A Funny Thing Happened on the Way to the Gynecologic Oncology Unit at Memorial Sloan-Kettering Cancer Center of New York City – William Cantler, Karyn Casl; How to Transcend a Happy Marriage – Daniel Swee; Sweeney Todd – Cesar A. Rocha; Sweet Charity – Judy Henderson, Ally Beans	**New York Theatre – Drama**: **Dead Poets Society – William Cantler, Karyn Casl**; The Hairy Ape – Tiffany Little Canfield; Associate: Cesar A. Rocha; Small Mouth Sounds – Henry Russell Bergstein, Lauren Port; The Wolves – William Cantler, Karyn Casl; Yen – William Cantler, Bernard Telsey, Karyn Casl, Adam Caldwell
**Regional Theatre East**: **The SpongeBob Musical – Patrick Goodwin, James Calleri, Paul Davis**; A Sign of the Times – Tara Rubin; Associate: Felicia Rudolph; American Son (MA production) – Pat McCorkle, Katja Zarolinski; American Son (NJ production) – Pat McCorkle, Katja Zarolinski; An American Daughter – William Cantler, Karyn Casl; Assassins – Tara Rubin	**Regional Theatre West**: **Zoot Suit – Pauline O'con**; A View from the Bridge – Karyn Casl, Patrick Goodwin; Actually – Phyllis Schuringa; An Octoroon – James Calleri, Erica Jensen, Amy Potozkin; Barbecue – Phyllis Schuringa; Merrily We Roll Along – Beth Lipari
**Los Angeles Theatre**: **The 24th Annual Young Playwrights Festival – Erica S. Bream, Cara Chute Rosenbaum (tie)**; **Waiting for Godot – Amanda Lenker Doyle, Chrissy Fiorilli-Ellington (tie)**; The House in Scarsdale: A Memoir for the Stage – Nicole Arbusto; The Tragedy of JFK (as Told by William Shakespeare) – Erica S. Bream, Cara Chute Rosenbaum; When Jazz Had the Blues – Michael Donovan; Associate: Richie Ferris	**Special Theatrical Performance**: **A Chorus Line – Margery Simkin, Michael Donovan; Associate: Richie Ferris**; Aida – Rachel Hoffman; Big River – Jay Binder; Crazy for You – Tara Rubin, Kaitlin Shaw; Associate: Felicia Rudolph; Wonderful Town – Jim Carnahan
**Theatre Tours**: **Hamilton (Chicago Company) – Bethany Knox; Associate: Rebecca Scholl**; The Curious Incident of the Dog in the Night-Time – Daniel Swee, Cindy Tolan; Fun Home – Jim Carnahan, Jillian Cimini; Hamilton (West Coast National Tour) – Bethany Knox; Associate: Rebecca Scholl; Hedwig and the Angry Inch – James Calleri, Paul Davis

=== Lynn Stalmaster Award ===
- **Kevin Huvane**

=== Marion Dougherty New York Apple Award ===
- **Barry Levinson**

=== Hoyt Bowers Award ===
- **Victoria Thomas**
