= Tammara Billik =

American casting director (born 1962)

- Born: June 21, 1962 (age 64); Palo Alto, California, U.S.
- Education: University of California, Los Angeles (BA); Loyola Marymount University (JD)
- Occupation: Casting director

Tammara M. "Tammy" Billik (born June 21, 1962 in Palo Alto, California) is an American Hollywood casting director who has cast hundreds of roles in television. Her best-known casting decision is when she and veteran casting director Marc Hirschfeld cast Ed O'Neill as Al Bundy for Fox Broadcasting's cult hit, Married... with Children.

In 1997, she also cast "The Puppy Episode" of the ABC series Ellen which saw Laura Dern, Emma Thompson, Sean Penn and many others as part of Ellen DeGeneres' history-making, coming-out experience.

== Career ==
Billik began her casting career working on movies including Raiders of the Lost Ark and E.T. As a casting assistant, she worked with top Casting Directors including Mike Fenton, Elisabeth Leustig, Mary Colquhoun and Judith Holstra/Marcia Ross. In 1987 she became the Casting Director of the Fox television series Married... with Children, and cast over 150 episodes of the series.

Billik received an Artios Award from the Casting Society of America in 1997 for her work on the Emmy winning series Ellen . Billik's casting of that series included bringing on series regulars Jeremy Piven and notable guest stars including, Emma Thompson, Jennifer Aniston, ZZ Top, Linda Ellerbee, Laura Dern. The "coming out" episode of Ellen The Puppy Episode was viewed by 27 million on ABC when it aired on April 30, 1997.

Billik has also cast the long-running series, Unhappily Ever After, for the now-defunct WB, which starred, Kevin Connolly, Nikki Cox, Geoff Pierson, Stephanie Hodge, Kristanna Loken and Ant (comedian). She then went on to cast the pilot and first season of the ABC series Samantha Who which reunited her with Married... with Children star Christina Applegate. In 1997, Billik won the prestigious Artios award for excellence in casting. She has been nominated on three additional occasions (twice for Ellen, and once for Samantha Who).

Billik is an executive producer on the short feature Boutonniere which is an official selection for the 2009 Sundance Film Festival, and as associate producer on the Sony Digital-produced webseries "Star-ving" starring David Faustino. In 2008, she launched AreUaStar for aspiring actors to connect with Casting Directors.

== Education ==
Billik is a 1983 graduate of the University of California, Los Angeles with a degree in theater arts. She received her Juris Doctor from Loyola Law School in Los Angeles before she was admitted to the State Bar of California in 1992.

== Activism ==
Billik has served on the board of directors of the largest national gay & lesbian organization, the Human Rights Campaign from 1998 to 2004. She has also been a longstanding member of the board of directors of the Los Angeles Gay & Lesbian Center, which is the largest LGBT social services organization in the world. Billik has also served as a board member for the Casting Society of America.

Billik was honored with the Guardian of Justice award by Temple Kol Ami in 2000 and with an honorary Artios award from the Casting Society of America for her leadership in organizing Casting Directors into a collective bargaining unit – Teamsters Local 399.
