= Primetime Emmy Award for Outstanding Casting for a Comedy Series =

Television award category

- Awarded for: Outstanding Casting for a Comedy Series
- Country: United States
- Presented by: Academy of Television Arts & Sciences
- Currently held by: Widow's Bay (2026)
- Website: emmys.com

This is a list of the winners and nominations for the Primetime Emmy Award for Outstanding Casting for a Comedy Series.

== Winners and nominations ==
=== 2000s ===
Year	Program	Casting	Network
2000 (52nd)
2000 (52nd)	Freaks and Geeks (Season 1: Part 1)	Allison Jones – casting executive; Coreen Mayrs and Jill Greenberg Sands – casting executives (location)	NBC
2000 (52nd)	Malcolm in the Middle (Season 1)	Mary V. Buck, Susan Edelman, Ken Miller, and Nikki Valko – casting executives	Fox
2000 (52nd)	Sex and the City (Season 2)	Kerry Barden, Billy Hopkins, Jennifer McNamara, and Suzanne Smith – casting executives	HBO
2000 (52nd)	Sports Night (Season 2)	Paula Rosenberg and Bonnie Zane – casting executives	ABC
2000 (52nd)	Will & Grace (Season 2)	Tracy Lilienfield – casting executive	NBC
2001 (53rd)
2001 (53rd)	Ally McBeal (Season 4)	Ken Miller and Nikki Valko – casting executives	Fox
2001 (53rd)	Ed (Season 1)	Brett Goldstein, Carol Kelsay, Jonathan Strauss, Todd Thaler, and Bonnie Zane – casting executives	NBC
2001 (53rd)	Frasier (Season 8)	Jeff Greenberg – casting executive	NBC
2001 (53rd)	Sex and the City (Season 3)	Jennifer McNamara – casting executive	HBO
2001 (53rd)	Will & Grace (Season 3)	Tracy Lilienfield – casting executive	NBC
2002 (54th)
2002 (54th)	Sex and the City (Season 4)	Jennifer McNamara – casting executive	HBO
2002 (54th)	Frasier (Season 9)	Jeff Greenberg – casting director	NBC
2002 (54th)	Friends (Season 8)	Leslie Litt and Barbara Miller – casting directors	NBC
2002 (54th)	Scrubs (Season 1)	Brett Benner and Debby Romano – casting directors	NBC
2002 (54th)	Will & Grace (Season 4)	Tracy Lilienfield – casting director	NBC
2003 (55th)
2003 (55th)	Sex and the City (Season 5)	Jennifer McNamara – casting director	HBO
2003 (55th)	Curb Your Enthusiasm (Season 3)	Marla Garlin, Richard Hicks and Ronnie Yeskel – casting directors	HBO
2003 (55th)	Friends (Season 9)	Leslie Litt and Barbara Miller – casting directors	NBC
2003 (55th)	Scrubs (Season 2)	Brett Benner and Debby Romano – casting directors	NBC
2003 (55th)	Will & Grace (Season 5)	Tracy Lilienfield – casting director	NBC
2004 (56th)
2004 (56th)	Arrested Development (Season 1)	Deborah Barylski and Geraldine Leder – casting directors	Fox
2004 (56th)	Curb Your Enthusiasm (Season 4)	Allison Jones – casting director	HBO
2004 (56th)	Frasier (Season 11)	Jeff Greenberg – casting director	NBC
2004 (56th)	Monk (Season 2)	Anya Colloff, Lonnie Hamerman, Meg Liberman, Sandi Logan, Amy McIntyre Britt, and Cami Patton – casting directors	USA
2004 (56th)	Sex and the City (Season 6)	Jennifer McNamara – casting director	HBO
2005 (57th)
2005 (57th)	Desperate Housewives (Season 1)	Scott Genkinger and Junie Lowry-Johnson – casting directors	ABC
2005 (57th)	Arrested Development (Season 2)	Allison Jones – casting director	Fox
2005 (57th)	Entourage (Season 1)	Sheila Jaffe, Meredith Tucker, and Georgianne Walken – casting directors	HBO
2005 (57th)	Scrubs (Season 4)	Brett Benner and Debby Romano – casting directors	NBC
2005 (57th)	Will & Grace (Season 7)	Tracy Lilienfield – casting director	NBC
2006 (58th)
2006 (58th)	My Name Is Earl (Season 1)	Dava Waite Peaslee – casting director	NBC
2006 (58th)	The Comeback (Season 1)	Elizabeth Barnes, Meg Liberman, and Cami Patton – casting directors	HBO
2006 (58th)	Curb Your Enthusiasm (Season 5)	Allison Jones – casting director	HBO
2006 (58th)	Desperate Housewives (Season 2)	Scott Genkinger and Junie Lowry-Johnson – casting directors	ABC
2006 (58th)	Entourage (Season 2)	Sheila Jaffe, Meredith Tucker, and Georgianne Walken – casting directors	HBO
2006 (58th)	Weeds (Season 1)	Amy McIntyre Britt and Anya Colloff – casting directors	Showtime
2007 (59th)
2007 (59th)	Ugly Betty (Season 1)	Libby Goldstein and Junie Lowry-Johnson – casting directors	ABC
2007 (59th)	Desperate Housewives (Season 3)	Junie Lowry-Johnson and Scott Genkinger – casting directors	ABC
2007 (59th)	Entourage (Season 3)	Sheila Jaffe and Georgianne Walken – casting directors	HBO
2007 (59th)	30 Rock (Season 1)	Jennifer McNamara – casting director	NBC
2007 (59th)	Weeds (Season 2)	Amy McIntyre Britt and Anya Colloff – casting directors	Showtime
2008 (60th)
2008 (60th)	30 Rock (Season 2)	Jennifer McNamara Shroff – casting director	NBC
2008 (60th)	Californication (Season 1)	Felicia Fasano – casting directors; Pat McCorkle – original New York casting director	Showtime
2008 (60th)	Curb Your Enthusiasm (Season 6)	Allison Jones – casting director	HBO
2008 (60th)	Pushing Daisies (Season 1)	Camille Patton, Meg Liberman, and Jennifer Lare – casting directors	ABC
2008 (60th)	Ugly Betty (Season 2)	Jeff Greenberg and Mark Scott – casting directors	ABC
2009 (61st)
2009 (61st)	30 Rock (Season 3)	Jennifer McNamara-Shroff – casting director	NBC
2009 (61st)	Californication (Season 2)	Felicia Fasano – casting director	Showtime
2009 (61st)	The Office (Season 5)	Allison Jones – casting director	NBC
2009 (61st)	United States of Tara (Season 1)	Allison Jones – original casting director; Cami Patton and Elizabeth Barnes – casting directors	Showtime
2009 (61st)	Weeds (Season 4)	Dava Waite Peaslee – casting director	Showtime

=== 2010s ===
Year	Program	Casting	Network
2010 (62nd)
2010 (62nd)	Modern Family (Season 1)	Jeff Greenberg – casting director	ABC
2010 (62nd)	Glee (Season 1)	Robert J. Ulrich and Eric Dawson – casting directors; Jim Carnahan – New York casting director	Fox
2010 (62nd)	Nurse Jackie (Seasons 1-2)	Julie Tucker and Ross Meyerson – casting directors	Showtime
2010 (62nd)	30 Rock (Season 4)	Jennifer McNamara-Shroff – casting director	NBC
2010 (62nd)	United States of Tara (Season 2)	Cami Patton and Jennifer Lare – casting directors	Showtime
2011 (63rd)
2011 (63rd)	Glee (Season 2)	Robert J. Ulrich and Eric Dawson – casting directors	Fox
2011 (63rd)	The Big C (Season 1)	Julie Tucker and Ross Meyerson – casting directors	Showtime
2011 (63rd)	Modern Family (Season 2)	Jeff Greenberg – casting director	ABC
2011 (63rd)	Nurse Jackie (Season 3)	Julie Tucker and Ross Meyerson – casting directors	Showtime
2011 (63rd)	30 Rock (Season 5)	Jennifer McNamara Shroff and Katja Blichfeld – casting directors	NBC
2012 (64th)
2012 (64th)	Girls (Season 1)	Jennifer Euston – casting director	HBO
2012 (64th)	The Big C (Season 2)	Bernard Telsey – casting director	Showtime
2012 (64th)	Modern Family (Season 3)	Jeff Greenberg – casting director	ABC
2012 (64th)	New Girl (Season 1)	Seth Yanklewitz, Juel Bestrop, Anya Colloff, and Michael Nicolo – casting directors	Fox
2012 (64th)	Nurse Jackie (Season 4)	Julie Tucker and Ross Meyerson – casting directors	Showtime
2012 (64th)	Veep (Season 1)	Allison Jones, Pat Moran, and Jennifer Euston – casting directors	HBO
2013 (65th)
2013 (65th)	30 Rock (Season 7)	Jennifer McNamara-Shroff, Katja Blichfeld, and Jessica Daniels – casting directors	NBC
2013 (65th)	Girls (Season 2)	Jennifer Euston – casting director	HBO
2013 (65th)	Modern Family (Season 4)	Jeff Greenberg – casting director	ABC
2013 (65th)	Nurse Jackie (Season 5)	Julie Tucker and Ross Meyerson – casting director	Showtime
2013 (65th)	Veep (Season 2)	Allison Jones, Pat Moran, and Meredith Tucker – casting directors	HBO
2014 (66th)
2014 (66th)	Orange Is the New Black (Season 1)	Jennifer Euston – casting director	Netflix
2014 (66th)	Louie (Season 4)	Gayle Keller – casting director	FX
2014 (66th)	Modern Family (Season 5)	Jeff Greenberg – casting director	ABC
2014 (66th)	Nurse Jackie (Season 6)	Julie Tucker and Ross Meyerson – casting director	Showtime
2014 (66th)	Veep (Season 3)	Allison Jones, Pat Moran, and Meredith Tucker – casting directors	HBO
2015 (67th)
2015 (67th)	Veep (Season 4)	Allison Jones, Meredith Tucker, and Pat Moran – casting directors	HBO
2015 (67th)	Louie (Season 5)	Gayle Keller – casting director	FX
2015 (67th)	Modern Family (Season 6)	Jeff Greenberg – casting director	ABC
2015 (67th)	Transparent (Season 1)	Eyde Belasco – casting director	Amazon
2015 (67th)	Unbreakable Kimmy Schmidt (Season 1)	Jennifer Euston and Meredith Tucker – casting directors	Netflix
2016 (68th)
2016 (68th)	Veep (Season 5)	Allison Jones and Beth Harris – casting directors	HBO
2016 (68th)	Modern Family (Season 7)	Jeff Greenberg – casting director	ABC
2016 (68th)	Silicon Valley (Season 3)	Jeanne McCarthy, Nicole Abellera Hallman, and Leslie Woo – casting directors	HBO
2016 (68th)	Transparent (Season 2)	Eyde Belasco – casting director	Amazon
2016 (68th)	Unbreakable Kimmy Schmidt (Season 2)	Cindy Tolan – casting director	Netflix
2017 (69th)
2017 (69th)	Veep (Season 6)	Dorian Frankel and Sibby Kirchgessner – casting directors	HBO
2017 (69th)	Atlanta (Season 1)	Alexa L. Fogel – casting director; Tara Feldstein Bennett and Chase Paris – location casting	FX
2017 (69th)	Master of None (Season 2)	Cody Beke – casting director; Teresa Razzauti – location casting	Netflix
2017 (69th)	Silicon Valley (Season 4)	Jeanne McCarthy, Nicole Abellera Hallman, and Leslie Woo – casting directors	HBO
2017 (69th)	Transparent (Season 3)	Eyde Belasco – casting director	Amazon
2018 (70th)
2018 (70th)	The Marvelous Mrs. Maisel (Season 1)	Meredith Tucker and Jeanie Bacharach – original casting directors; Cindy Tolan – casting director	Amazon
2018 (70th)	Atlanta (Season 2)	Alexa L. Fogel – casting director; Tara Feldstein Bennett and Chase Paris – Atlanta casting	FX
2018 (70th)	Barry (Season 1)	Sharon Bialy and Sherry Thomas – casting directors	HBO
2018 (70th)	GLOW (Season 1)	Jennifer Euston and Elizabeth Barnes – casting directors	Netflix
2018 (70th)	Silicon Valley (Season 5)	Jeanne McCarthy, Nicole Abellera Hallman and Leslie Woo – casting directors	HBO
2019 (71st)
2019 (71st)	Fleabag (Season 2)	Olivia Scott-Webb – casting director	Amazon
2019 (71st)	Barry (Season 2)	Sharon Bialy and Sherry Thomas – casting directors	HBO
2019 (71st)	The Marvelous Mrs. Maisel (Season 2)	Cindy Tolan – casting director	Amazon
2019 (71st)	Russian Doll (Season 1)	Christine Kromer – casting director	Netflix
2019 (71st)	Veep (Season 7)	Dorian Frankel and Sibby Kirchgessner – casting directors	HBO

=== 2020s ===
Year	Program	Casting	Network
2020 (72nd)
2020 (72nd)	Schitt's Creek (Season 6)	Lisa Parasyn and Jon Comerford – casting directors	Pop
2020 (72nd)	Curb Your Enthusiasm (Season 10)	Allison Jones and Ben Harris – casting directors	HBO
2020 (72nd)	Dead to Me (Season 2)	Sharon Bialy, Russell Scott and Sherry Thomas – casting directors	Netflix
2020 (72nd)	Insecure (Season 4)	Victoria Thomas and Matthew Maisto – casting directors	HBO
2020 (72nd)	The Marvelous Mrs. Maisel (Season 3)	Cindy Tolan – casting director	Prime Video
2020 (72nd)	What We Do in the Shadows (Season 2)	Gayle Keller– casting director; Jenny Lewis and Sara Kay – Canadian casting directors	FX
2021 (73rd)
2021 (73rd)	Ted Lasso (Season 1)	Theo Park – casting director	Apple TV+
2021 (73rd)	The Flight Attendant (Season 1)	Kim Miscia, Beth Bowling - casting directors; John Papsidera – original casting director	HBO Max
2021 (73rd)	Hacks (Season 1)	Jeanne McCarthy and Nicole Abellera Hallman – casting directors	HBO Max
2021 (73rd)	The Kominsky Method (Season 3)	Nikki Valko, Ken Miller and Tara Treacy – casting directors	Netflix
2021 (73rd)	PEN15 (Season 2, Part 1)	Melissa DeLizia – casting director	Hulu
2022 (74th)
2022 (74th)	Abbott Elementary (Season 1)	Wendy O'Brien – casting director	ABC
2022 (74th)	Barry (Season 3)	Sherry Thomas and Sharon Bialy – casting directors	HBO
2022 (74th)	Curb Your Enthusiasm (Season 11)	Allison Jones and Ben Harris – casting directors	HBO
2022 (74th)	Hacks (Season 2)	Jeanne McCarthy and Nicole Abellera Hallman – casting directors	HBO Max
2022 (74th)	Only Murders in the Building (Season 1)	Bernard Telsey and Tiffany Little Canfield – casting directors	Hulu
2022 (74th)	Ted Lasso (Season 2)	Theo Park – casting director	Apple TV+
2023 (75th)
2023 (75th)	The Bear (Season 1)	Jeanie Bacharach – casting director; Jennifer Rudnicke, Mickie Paskal and AJ Links - location casting directors	FX
2023 (75th)	Abbott Elementary (Season 2)	Wendy O'Brien and Chris Gehrt – casting directors	ABC
2023 (75th)	Jury Duty (Season 1)	Susie Farris – casting director	Amazon Freevee
2023 (75th)	Only Murders in the Building (Season 2)	Bernard Telsey, Tiffany Canfield and Destiny Lilly – casting directors	Hulu
2023 (75th)	Ted Lasso (Season 3)	Theo Park - casting director	Apple TV+
2024 (76th)
2024 (76th)	The Bear (Season 2)	Jeanie Bacharach and Maggie Bacharach – casting directors; Jennifer Rudnicke, Mickie Paskal and AJ Links - location casting directors	FX
2024 (76th)	Abbott Elementary (Season 3)	Wendy O'Brien and Chris Gehrt – casting directors	ABC
2024 (76th)	Curb Your Enthusiasm (Season 12)	Allison Jones - casting director	HBO
2024 (76th)	Hacks (Season 3)	Jeanne McCarthy and Nicole Abellera Hallman – casting directors	Max
2024 (76th)	Only Murders in the Building (Season 3)	Bernard Telsey, Tiffany Little Canfield and Destiny Lilly – casting directors	Hulu
2025 (77th)
2025 (77th)	The Studio (Season 1)	Melissa Kostenbauder and Francine Maisler – casting directors	Apple TV+
2025 (77th)	The Bear (Season 3)	Jeanie Bacharach and Maggie Bacharach – casting directors; Jennifer Rudnicke and Mickie Paskal – location casting directors	FX
2025 (77th)	Hacks (Season 4)	Linda Lowy and Morgan Smith – casting directors	HBO Max
2025 (77th)	Only Murders in the Building (Season 4)	Bernard Telsey, Tiffany Little Canfield and Destiny Lilly – casting directors	Hulu
2025 (77th)	Shrinking (Season 2)	Debby Romano and Brett Benner – casting directors	Apple TV+
2026 (78th)
2026 (78th)	Widow's Bay (Season 1)	Allison Jones and Emily Buntyn – casting directors; Lisa Lobel and Angela Peri – location casting directors	Apple TV
2026 (78th)	Abbott Elementary (Season 5)	Wendy O'Brien and Chris Gehrt – casting directors	ABC
2026 (78th)	Hacks (Season 5)	Linda Lowy and Morgan Smith – casting directors; Lily Trotter – associate casting director	HBO Max
2026 (78th)	Only Murders in the Building (Season 5)	Bernard Telsey, Tiffany Little Canfield and Destiny Lilly – casting directors	Hulu
2026 (78th)	Shrinking (Season 3)	Brett Benner and Debby Romano – casting directors; Daniel Schwab – associate casting director	Apple TV

== Multiple wins ==
5 wins

- Jennifer McNamara (2 consecutive, twice)

4 wins

- Allison Jones (2 consecutive)

3 wins

- Jeanie Bacharach (2 consecutive)

2 wins

- Jennifer Euston
- Junie Lowry-Johnson
- AJ Links (2 consecutive)
- Mickie Paskal (2 consecutive)
- Jennifer Rudnicke (2 consecutive)
- Meredith Tucker

== Programs with multiple wins ==
3 wins

- 30 Rock (2 consecutive)
- Veep (consecutive)

2 wins

- The Bear (consecutive)
- Sex and the City (consecutive)

== Casting directors with multiple nominations ==
16 nominations

- Allison Jones

14 nominations

- Jeff Greenberg

11 nominations

- Jennifer McNamara

7 nominations

- Meredith Tucker

6 nominations

- Nicole Abellera
- Jeanie Bacharach
- Jeanne McCarthy
- Ross Meyerson
- Bernard Telsey
- Julie Tucker

5 nominations

- Brett Benner
- Tiffany Little Canfield
- Jennifer Euston
- Meg Liberman
- Debby Romano

4 nominations

- Sharon Bialy
- Destiny Lilly
- Junie Lowry-Johnson
- Pat Moran
- Wendy O'Brien
- Cindy Tolan
- Sherry Thomas

3 nominations

- Elizabeth Barnes
- Chris Gehrt
- Scott Genkinger
- Ben Harris
- Sheila Jaffe
- Theo Park
- Georgianne Walken
- Mickie Paskal
- Jennifer Rudnicke
- Leslie Woo

2 nominations

- Maggie Bacharach
- Katja Blichfeld
- Marc Hirschfeld
- Sharon Jetton
- AJ Links
- Leslie Litt
- Linda Lowy
- Barbara Miller
- Brian Myers
- Morgan Smith

== Programs with multiple nominations ==
7 nominations

- Curb Your Enthusiasm
- Modern Family
- Veep

6 nominations

- 30 Rock
- Frasier

5 nominations

- Hacks
- Nurse Jackie
- Only Murders in the Building
- Sex and the City
- Will & Grace

4 nominations

- Abbott Elementary

3 nominations

- Ally McBeal
- Barry
- Desperate Housewives
- Entourage
- The Marvelous Mrs. Maisel
- Scrubs
- Silicon Valley
- Ted Lasso
- The Bear
- Transparent
- Weeds

2 nominations

- Arrested Development
- Atlanta
- The Big C
- Californication
- Friends
- Girls
- Glee
- Louie
- Shrinking
- Ugly Betty
- Unbreakable Kimmy Schmidt
- United States of Tara

== Total awards by network ==
- HBO - 6
- NBC - 5
- ABC - 4
- Apple TV+ / Fox – 3
- Amazon / FX - 2
- Netflix / Pop TV - 1
