= Robert J. Ulrich (casting director) =

American casting director

- Born: United States
- Occupations: Casting director, film producer
- Known for: Glee

Robert J. Ulrich is an American casting director and producer active since the 1980s and best known for casting television shows including Glee, The Boys, Zoey's Extraordinary Playlist, Supernatural, Battlestar Galactica, CSI, Diagnosis: Murder and Matlock. He has also cast most Ryan Murphy productions since Popular in 1999. He has been nominated for nine Emmy Awards, winning a Primetime Emmy Award for casting Glee. He has been nominated for the Artios Awards 22 times and won twice, for casting Glee and Nip/Tuck.

== Career ==
Robert J. Ulrich began his career as a stage actor, but realized he would not be successful. He moved into casting and says he learned more about acting his first time behind the table than in his previous career.

Known for casting musical television series, Ulrich told The Hollywood Reporter that "it's so much more fun when you're doing a musical, because people are singing and your day's suddenly better." He developed this musical casting process for the show Rhapsody, which did not get greenlit. Initially, he would have auditionees sing a cappella or with a backing track, but insisted on bringing a live pianist for the callbacks, saying in 2020 that "great singers are better with a piano and less trained singers are much better with a piano". He has also said that having live piano sets actors at ease. The pianist he found for the Rhapsody callbacks was Brad Ellis, whom he would use for subsequent musical auditions as well as integrating into shows like Glee. Ulrich's musical casting process has not changed since Rhapsody, and he encourages actors to showcase themselves. He has also opined that for television, he considers acting ability above singing and that actors from the stage "should bring it down for the screen." Sometimes for auditions later in a show a pianist will not be used.

Ulrich became involved with casting for Glee through his business partner Eric Dawson, who had worked with creator Ryan Murphy on multiple occasions; Dawson suggested Ulrich should be involved due to his musical background. While working on the show he helped develop the reality series The Glee Project, which he described as an extension of the comedy-musical's casting process. In 2021, The Hollywood Reporter wrote that Ulrich does not find musical casting challenging, as he has many connections with triple threat performers; for Zoey's Extraordinary Playlist he cast several actors he had seen for prior auditions, including Jane Levy, who had previously auditioned for him for The Rocky Horror Picture Show: Let's Do the Time Warp Again, and Michael Thomas Grant and Alex Newell who had been contestants on The Glee Project.

He is affiliated with professional guilds The Academy of Television Arts and Sciences, the Casting Society of America, the Producers Guild of America, and Teamsters Local 399.

He was also a producer of Billy Boy, a 2017 film written by and starring Glee performers Melissa Benoist and Blake Jenner.

== Personal life ==
He is married to actress Kim Johnston Ulrich. The couple judged the annual "Valley's Got Talent" in Ulrich's hometown of Modesto, California, together.

== Filmography ==
=== Film ===
| Year | Production | Role(s) | Notes | Refs. |
|---|---|---|---|---|
| 1988 | The Unholy | Casting | | |
| 1988 | Midnight Crossing | Casting | | |
| 1989 | Paint It Black | Casting | | |
| 1990 | Spies on Ice | Casting | | |
| 1990 | Downtown | Casting | | |
| 1992 | Spies, Inc. | Casting | | |
| 1993 | Airborne | Casting | | |
| 1993 | Monolith | Casting | | |
| 1999 | Cold Hearts | Casting | | |
| 2005 | Wheelmen | Casting, co-producer | | |
| 2016 | Holly's Girl | Casting, executive producer | Short film | |
| 2016 | This is How | Casting | Short film | |
| 2017 | Billy Boy | Casting, producer | | |
| 2018 | Mail Order Monster | Casting, producer | | |
| 2019 | Assimilate | Casting | | |
| 2019 | Softer | Casting, producer | Short film | |
| 2019 | Foster Boy | Casting, co-producer | | |
| 2020 | The Boys in the Band | Casting | | |

=== Television ===
All roles only casting unless noted.

| Year | Production | Notes | Refs. |
|---|---|---|---|
| 1988 | Family Man | | |
| 1989 | Father Dowling Mysteries | | |
| 1991 | Adventures in Wonderland | Pilot | |
| 1991 | This Gun for Hire | TV movie | |
| 1990–1992 | Jake and the Fatman | | |
| 1991–1992 | Eerie, Indiana | | |
| 1992 | The Hannigans | Pilot | |
| 1992 | The Round Table | | |
| 1992–1993 | Melrose Place | | |
| 1993 | Arly Hanks | Pilot | |
| 1993 | Ned Blessing: The True Story of My Life | TV movie | |
| 1991–1994 | Perry Mason | 10 episodes; TV film series | |
| 1994 | Weldon Pond | Pilot | |
| 1994 | Close to Home | Pilot | |
| 1994 | The Byrds of Paradise | | |
| 1994 | Green Dolphin Beat | TV movie | |
| 1994 | Heaven Help Us | | |
| 1988–1995 | Matlock | | |
| 1994–1995 | Ray Alexander | 2 episodes; TV film series | |
| 1995 | Hell | Pilot | |
| 1995 | Fast Company | Pilot | |
| 1995 | P.C.H. | | |
| 1995 | Extreme Blue | | |
| 1995 | Gramps | | |
| 1995 | Bringing up Jack | | |
| 1995 | Deadly Games | | |
| 1995 | The Adventures of Captain Zoom in Outer Space | | |
| 1995–1996 | Strange Luck | | |
| 1996 | The Gail O'Grady Project | | |
| 1996 | Dark Angel | | |
| 1996 | She Cried No | | |
| 1996 | Dark Skies | | |
| 1995–1997 | Diagnosis: Murder | | |
| 1996–1997 | Moloney | | |
| 1997 | Dogs | Pilot | |
| 1997 | Spy Game | | |
| 1997 | Timecop | | |
| 1997 | The Gregory Hines Show | | |
| 1997–1998 | Early Edition | | |
| 1997–1998 | Pensacola: Wings of Gold | | |
| 1998 | The Dave Chappelle Project | Pilot | |
| 1998 | Glory, Glory | Pilot | |
| 1998 | DayBreak | Pilot | |
| 1998 | Rag and Bone | | |
| 1998 | Rude Awakening | | |
| 1998 | To Have & to Hold | | |
| 1998 | The Wonderful World of Disney | Anthology series | |
| 1998 | Wind on Water | | |
| 1998–1999 | The Net | | |
| 1999 | Sagamore | Pilot | |
| 1999 | Partner | Pilot | |
| 1999 | Ladies Man | | |
| 1999 | Ryan Caulfield: Year One | | |
| 2000 | Brutally Normal | | |
| 1999–2001 | Popular | | |
| 2001 | Earth Angels | Pilot | |
| 2001 | Sam's Circus | Pilot | |
| 2001 | The Chronicle | | |
| 1998–2002 | Any Day Now | | |
| 1998–2002 | V.I.P. | | |
| 2000–2002 | Dark Angel | | |
| 2001–2002 | The Tick | | |
| 2001–2002 | Felicity | | |
| 2002 | CSI: Miami | Pilot | |
| 2002 | The American Embassy | | |
| 2002 | Push, Nevada | | |
| 2002 | MDs | | |
| 2001–2003 | The Agency | | |
| 2003 | Naked Hotel | Pilot | |
| 2003 | Crazy Love | Pilot | |
| 2003 | Hope & Faith | | |
| 2003 | The Lyon's Den | | |
| 2003 | Battlestar Galactica | Miniseries | |
| 2001–2004 | The Chris Isaak Show | | |
| 2002–2004 | Odyssey 5 | | |
| 2004 | Homeland Security | TV movie | |
| 2004–2005 | Jack & Bobby | | |
| 2005 | Cyber Seduction: His Secret Life | TV movie | |
| 2005 | Wildfire | | |
| 2002–2006 | The Dead Zone | | |
| 2003–2006 | Missing | | |
| 2004–2006 | Everwood | | |
| 2005–2006 | Killer Instinct | | |
| 2005–2006 | Just Legal | | |
| 2006 | Standoff | Pilot | |
| 2006 | Kyle XY | Pilot | |
| 2006 | Him and Us | Pilot | |
| 2006 | The Book of Daniel | | |
| 2006 | Not Like Everyone Else | | |
| 2006 | The Year Without a Santa Claus | TV movie | |
| 2006 | Monarch Cove | | |
| 2005–2007 | Eyes | | |
| 2006–2007 | Day Break | | |
| 2007 | Conspiracy | Pilot | |
| 2007 | Company Man | Pilot | |
| 2007 | Battlestar Galactica: Razor | TV movie | |
| 2007 | Bionic Woman | | |
| 2007 | Journeyman | | |
| 2008 | The Mentalist | Pilot | |
| 2008 | Pretty/Handsome | Pilot | |
| 2004–2009 | Battlestar Galactica | | |
| 2008–2009 | Eli Stone | | |
| 2008–2009 | Eureka | | |
| 2009 | Virtuality | Pilot | |
| 2009 | The Magic 7 | TV movie; animation | |
| 2003–2010 | Nip/Tuck | | |
| 2007–2010 | Saving Grace | | |
| 2009–2010 | Eastwick | | |
| 2010 | Tower Prep | Pilot | |
| 2010 | Scoundrels | | |
| 2010 | Lone Star | | |
| 2010 | Caprica | | |
| 2010–2011 | Rizzoli & Isles | | |
| 2011 | Spring/Fall | | |
| 2011 | Against the Wall | | |
| 2008–2012 | In Plain Sight | | |
| 2012 | The Frontier | | |
| 2012 | The Glee Project | Reality competition show; also co-creator and coach | |
| 2009–2013 | Drop Dead Diva | | |
| 2013–2014 | Witches of East End | | |
| 2014 | Crisis | | |
| 2000–2015 | CSI: Crime Scene Investigation | | |
| 2008–2015 | Glee | | |
| 2014–2015 | Helix | | |
| 2015 | Stanistan | Pilot | |
| 2015 | CSI: Cyber | Pilot | |
| 2015 | Quantico | Pilot | |
| 2016 | The Jury | Pilot | |
| 2016 | Marvel's Most Wanted | Pilot | |
| 2016 | Home | Pilot | |
| 2016 | Conviction | Pilot | |
| 2016 | The Family | | |
| 2016 | Underground | | |
| 2016 | Game of Silence | | |
| 2016 | The Rocky Horror Picture Show: Let's Do the Time Warp Again | TV movie | |
| 2016–2017 | The Exorcist | | |
| 2017 | The Haunted | Pilot | |
| 2017 | Doomsday | Pilot | |
| 2017 | Behind Enemy Lines | Pilot | |
| 2017 | Feud | | |
| 2017 | Daytime Divas | | |
| 2013–2018 | Major Crimes | | |
| 2014–2018 | Girlfriends' Guide to Divorce | | |
| 2016–2018 | Designated Survivor | | |
| 2016–2018 | Shooter | | |
| 2018 | Chiefs | | |
| 2019 | Thirtysomething(else) | Pilot | |
| 2019 | Prism | Pilot | |
| 2019 | L.A.'s Finest | Pilot | |
| 2005–2020 | Supernatural | | |
| 2018–2020 | The Good Doctor | | |
| 2019–2020 | Tell Me a Story | | |
| 2020 | Tiny Pretty Things | | |
| 2020–2021 | Zoey's Extraordinary Playlist | | |
| 2021 | Epic | Pilot | |
| 2021 | Untitled Goonies Re-enactment Project | Pilot | |
| 2021 | Generation | | |
| 2011–present | American Horror Story | Anthology series | |
| 2018–present | The Rookie | | |
| 2018–present | 9-1-1 | | |
| 2019–2026 | The Boys | | |
| 2019–2023 | All Rise | | |
| 2020-2023 | Big Sky | | |
| 2020-2024 | Station 19 | | |
| 2020–present | Grey's Anatomy | | |
| 2021–2024 | American Horror Stories | Anthology series | |
| TBC | Monarch | | |
| TBC | In From the Cold | | |
| 2022-2022 | Monster: The Jeffrey Dahmer Story | | |
| TBC | Untitled The Boys Spinoff | | |

=== Theatre ===
| Year | Production | Role(s) | Notes | Refs. |
|---|---|---|---|---|
| 2017 | The Civility of Albert Cashier | Casting, producer | | |

== Awards and nominations ==
In over 30 years in casting, Ulrich and his company Ulrich/Dawson/Kritzer Casting (UDK) have been nominated for over twenty Artios Awards and nine Emmy Awards.

| Year | Association | Category | Work | Result | Refs. |
|---|---|---|---|---|---|
| 1992 | Artios Awards | Outstanding Achievement in Daytime Casting | Adventures in Wonderland | Nominated | |
| 1998 | Artios Awards | Outstanding Achievement in Comedy Pilot Casting | The Gregory Hines Show | Nominated | |
| 2000 | Artios Awards | Outstanding Achievement in Comedy Pilot Casting | Popular | Nominated | |
| 2004 | Artios Awards | Dramatic Pilot Casting | Nip/Tuck | Nominated | |
| 2004 | Artios Awards | Dramatic Episodic Casting | Nip/Tuck | Nominated | |
| 2005 | Artios Awards | Outstanding Achievement in Dramatic Episodic Casting | Nip/Tuck | Won | |
| 2005 | Primetime Creative Arts Emmy Awards | Outstanding Casting for a Drama Series | Nip/Tuck | Nominated | |
| 2006 | Artios Awards | Children's Television Casting | Wildfire | Nominated | |
| 2007 | Artios Awards | Children's Television Casting | Kyle XY | Nominated | |
| 2008 | Artios Awards | Outstanding Achievement in Drama Pilot Casting | Saving Grace | Nominated | |
| 2009 | Artios Awards | Outstanding Achievement in Comedy Pilot Casting | Glee | Won | |
| 2010 | Artios Awards | Media Access Award | Glee | Won | |
| 2010 | Artios Awards | Television Series – Comedy Casting | Glee | Nominated | |
| 2010 | Primetime Creative Arts Emmy Awards | Outstanding Casting for a Comedy Series | Glee | Nominated | |
| 2011 | Primetime Creative Arts Emmy Awards | Outstanding Casting for a Comedy Series | Glee | Won | |
| 2011 | Artios Awards | Television Series – Comedy Casting | Glee | Nominated | |
| 2012 | Artios Awards | Mini-Series Casting | American Horror Story: Murder House | Nominated | |
| 2012 | Primetime Creative Arts Emmy Awards | Outstanding Casting for a Miniseries, Movie or a Special | American Horror Story: Murder House | Nominated | |
| 2013 | Artios Awards | Mini-Series Casting | American Horror Story: Asylum | Nominated | |
| 2013 | Primetime Creative Arts Emmy Awards | Outstanding Casting for a Miniseries, Movie or a Special | American Horror Story: Asylum | Nominated | |
| 2014 | Primetime Creative Arts Emmy Awards | Outstanding Casting for a Miniseries, Movie or a Special | American Horror Story: Coven | Nominated | |
| 2015 | Artios Awards | Mini-Series Casting | American Horror Story: Coven | Nominated | |
| 2015 | Primetime Creative Arts Emmy Awards | Outstanding Casting for a Limited Series, Movie, or Special | American Horror Story: Freak Show | Nominated | |
| 2016 | Artios Awards | Mini-Series Casting | American Horror Story: Freak Show | Nominated | |
| 2017 | Primetime Creative Arts Emmy Awards | Outstanding Casting for a Limited Series, Movie, or Special | Feud: Betty and Joan | Nominated | |
| 2018 | Artios Awards | Limited Series Casting | Feud: Betty and Joan | Nominated | |
| 2018 | Artios Awards | Film – Non-theatrical Release Casting | The Rocky Horror Picture Show: Let's Do the Time Warp Again | Nominated | |
| 2019 | Artios Awards | Hoyt Bowers Award | Contribution to casting | Won | |
| 2019 | Artios Awards | Micro-Budget Feature Casting – Comedy or Drama | Billy Boy | Nominated | |
| 2021 | Artios Awards | Television Pilot and First Season – Comedy Casting | Zoey's Extraordinary Playlist | Nominated | |
| 2021 | Artios Awards | Television Pilot and First Season – Drama Casting | The Boys | Nominated | |
| 2023 | Primetime Creative Arts Emmy Awards | Outstanding Casting for a Limited or Anthology Series or Movie | Dahmer - Monster: The Jeffrey Dahmer Story | Nominated | |
