= Allison Jones (casting director) =

American casting director

- Born: July 13, 1955 (age 71); Needham, Massachusetts, U.S.
- Education: Pomona College
- Occupation: Casting director
- Years active: 1985–present

Allison Jones (born 1955) is an American casting director who is credited for helping bring together realistic ensemble casts for popular television shows such as The Fresh Prince of Bel-Air (1990–1996), Freaks and Geeks (1999–2000), Curb Your Enthusiasm (2000–2024), Undeclared (2001–2002), Arrested Development (2003–2006), the American version of The Office (2005–2013), United States of Tara (2009–2011), Parks and Recreation (2009–2015), Veep (2012–2019), Brooklyn Nine-Nine (2013–2021), The Good Place (2016–2020), and What We Do in the Shadows (2019–2024).

== Early life and education ==
Jones grew up in Needham, Massachusetts. She was the second youngest child in a family with six children.

Jones graduated from Pomona College in 1977, with a degree in visual arts. During her time at Pomona, she cultivated an appreciation for what she called "pure geek existence" as her friends introduced her to Monty Python, The Firesign Theatre, and Saturday Night Live.

== Career ==
Jones has worked as a casting director in the entertainment business since 1982, with her first credited work for the television show being Family Ties and later in 1985, The Golden Girls. In 2015, her work as a casting director included the comedy film Get Hard; the Yahoo! Screen show Other Space, and the Netflix series Master of None.

Jones has cast popular television shows including Freaks and Geeks (for which she won an Emmy), Undeclared, The Fresh Prince of Bel-Air, Veep, What We Do in the Shadows, Our Flag Means Death, Parks and Recreation, Brooklyn Nine-Nine, The Good Place, Curb Your Enthusiasm, United States of Tara, Arrested Development (both of which she was also nominated for), and the US version of The Office.

She has also cast a number of successful films, including The 40-Year-Old Virgin (2005), Borat: Cultural Learnings of America for Make Benefit Glorious Nation of Kazakhstan (2006). Knocked Up (2007); The Dictator (2012), and Booksmart (2019). Jones also received casting credit for Talladega Nights: The Ballad of Ricky Bobby (2006), Hot Rod, Superbad (both 2007), Step Brothers (2008), Brüno (2009), Scott Pilgrim vs. the World (2010), Bridesmaids, Fright Night (both 2011), Ghostbusters, Kubo and the Two Strings, Sing (all 2016), Lady Bird (2017), and Eighth Grade (2018). In 2023, Jones and Lucy Bevan cast Barbie.

== Awards and nominations ==
Award	Year	Work	Category	Result	Ref.
Astra Film and Creative Awards	2024	Barbie	Best Casting Director	Won	
Alliance of Women Film Journalists	2024	Barbie	Best Ensemble Cast – Casting Director	Won	
Primetime Emmy Awards	2000	Freaks and Geeks	Outstanding Casting for a Comedy Series	Won	
Primetime Emmy Awards	2004	Curb Your Enthusiasm	Outstanding Casting for a Comedy Series	Nominated	
Primetime Emmy Awards	2004	Arrested Development	Outstanding Casting for a Comedy Series	Nominated	
Primetime Emmy Awards	2006	Curb Your Enthusiasm	Outstanding Casting for a Comedy Series	Nominated	
Primetime Emmy Awards	2008	Curb Your Enthusiasm	Outstanding Casting for a Comedy Series	Nominated	
Primetime Emmy Awards	2009	United States of Tara	Outstanding Casting for a Comedy Series	Nominated	
Primetime Emmy Awards	2009	The Office	Outstanding Casting for a Comedy Series	Nominated	
Primetime Emmy Awards	2012	Veep	Outstanding Casting for a Comedy Series	Nominated	
Primetime Emmy Awards	2013	Veep	Outstanding Casting for a Comedy Series	Nominated	
Primetime Emmy Awards	2014	Veep	Outstanding Casting for a Comedy Series	Nominated	
Primetime Emmy Awards	2015	Veep	Outstanding Casting for a Comedy Series	Won	
Primetime Emmy Awards	2016	Veep	Outstanding Casting for a Comedy Series	Won	
Primetime Emmy Awards	2020	Curb Your Enthusiasm	Outstanding Casting for a Comedy Series	Nominated	
Primetime Emmy Awards	2022	Curb Your Enthusiasm	Outstanding Casting for a Comedy Series	Nominated	
Primetime Emmy Awards	2024	Curb Your Enthusiasm	Outstanding Casting for a Comedy Series	Nominated	
Primetime Emmy Awards	2026	Widow's Bay	Outstanding Casting for a Comedy Series	Won	
