= Jennifer Euston =

American casting director

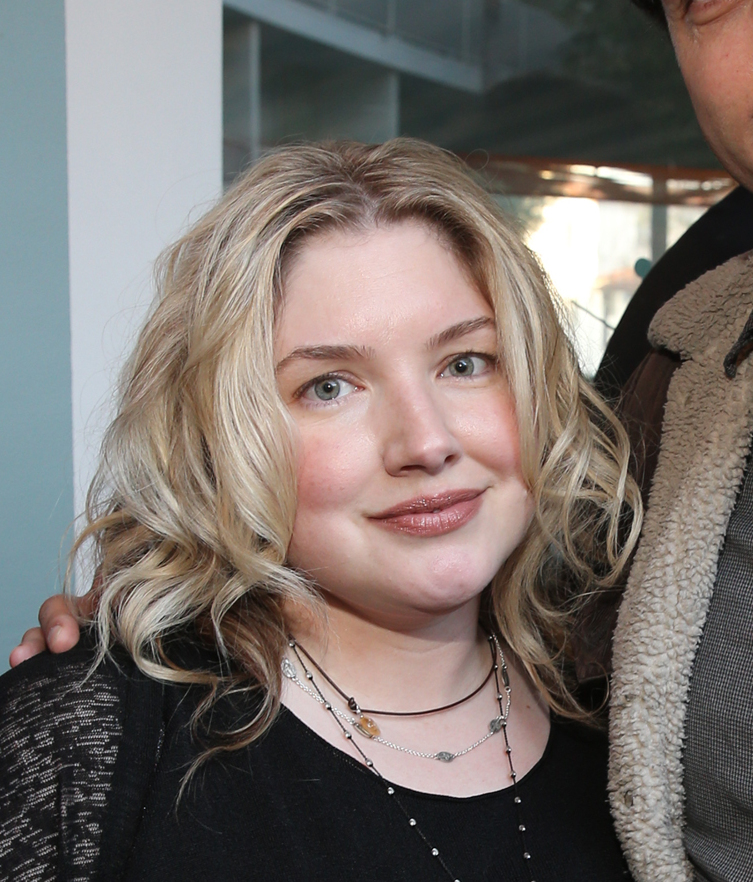
- Euston in 2017
- Born: West Caldwell, New Jersey, U.S.
- Occupation: Casting director
- Years active: 1990-present

Jennifer Euston is an American casting director. She won three Primetime Emmy Awards for Outstanding Casting for a Miniseries, Movie or a Special for The Pacific in 2010, Outstanding Casting for a Comedy Series for Girls in 2012 and Outstanding Casting for a Comedy Series for Orange Is the New Black in 2014.
