= Casting Society =

Professional association

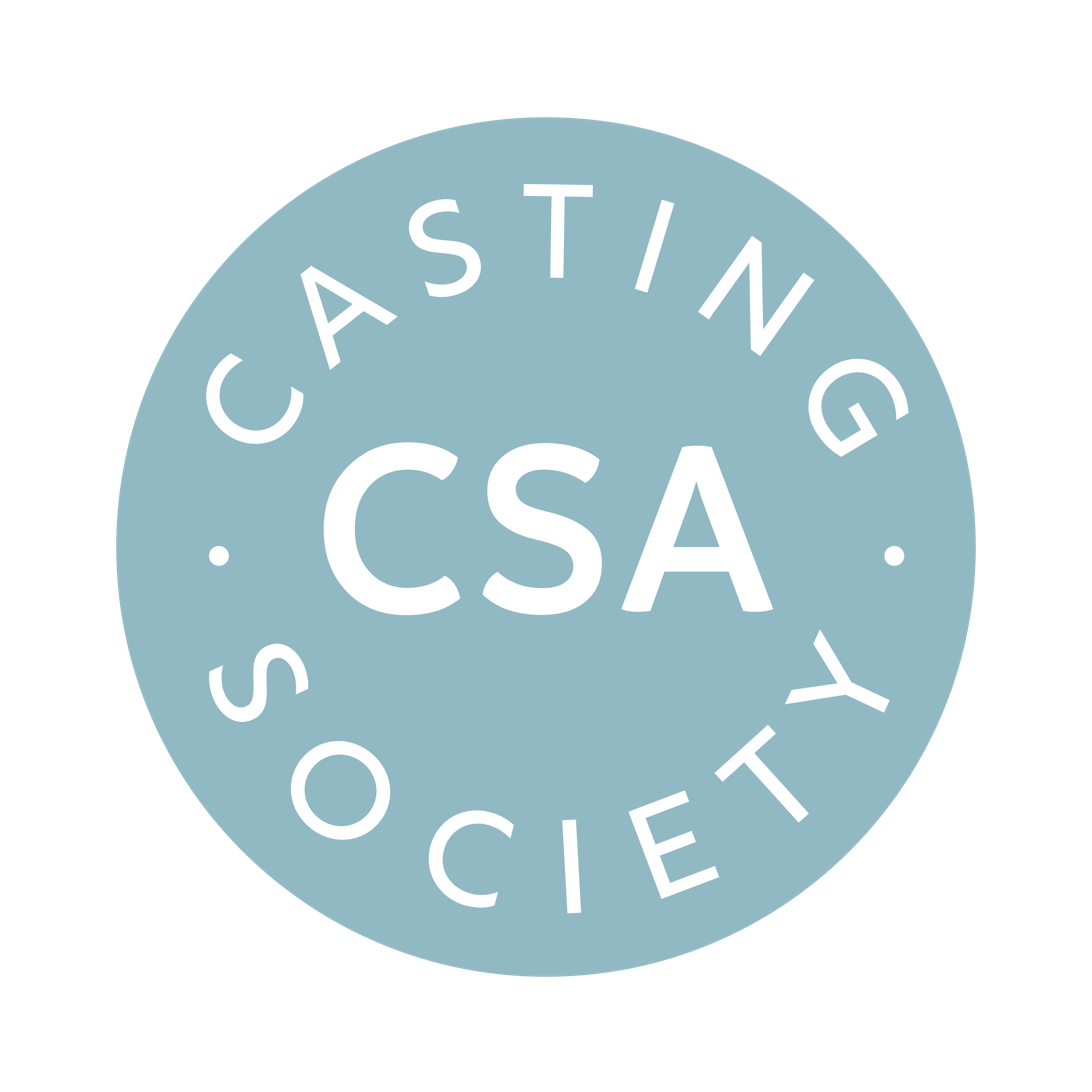
The logo of the Casting Society, reflecting its name change in 2022

The Casting Society, formerly known as the Casting Society of America (CSA), is a professional association of about 1,200 casting directors and associate casting directors for film, television, theatre, and commercials in Canada, Europe, Australia, Asia and Africa, and the United States. The nonprofit organization was founded in Los Angeles, California, in 1982, and announced its name change from the Casting Society of America to the Casting Society on February 10, 2022. The society is not to be confused with an industry union. The International Brotherhood of Teamsters represent most (though not all) of the major casting directors and associate casting directors in Hollywood. Members use the post-nominal letters "CSA" when credited for their work.

== Membership eligibility ==
The following requirements must be met to join the CSA:

- Sponsorship letters from at least two current members of the CSA.
- Two years of screen or stage credit as Primary Casting Director.

Casting directors who are also personal managers are not eligible for membership in the CSA.

== Artios Awards ==
Since October 1985, the Casting Society has presented the Artios Awards for excellence in casting. Members are honored in over 25 different casting categories in simultaneous events held in Beverly Hills, New York City and London.

=== List of ceremonies ===
- 2025 – 41st Artios Awards
- 2024 – 40th Artios Awards
- 2023 – 39th Artios Awards
- 2022 – 38th Artios Awards
- 2021 – 37th Artios Awards
- 2020 – 36th Artios Awards
- 2019 – 35th Artios Awards
- 2018 – 34th Artios Awards
- 2017 – 33rd Artios Awards
- 2016 – 32nd Artios Awards
- 2015 – 31st Artios Awards
- 2014 – 30th Artios Awards
- 2013 – no awards
- 2012 – 29th Artios Awards
- 2011 – 28th Artios Awards
- 2010 – 27th Artios Awards
- 2009 – 26th Artios Awards
- 2008 – 25th Artios Awards
- 2007 – 24th Artios Awards
- 2006 – 23rd Artios Awards
- 2005 – 22nd Artios Awards
- 2004 – 21st Artios Awards
- 2003 – 20th Artios Awards
- 2002 – 19th Artios Awards
- 2001 – 18th Artios Awards
- 2000 – 17th Artios Awards
- 1999 – 16th Artios Awards
- 1998 – 15th Artios Awards
- 1997 – 14th Artios Awards
- 1996 – 13th Artios Awards
- 1995 – 12th Artios Awards
- 1994 – 11th Artios Awards
- 1993 – 10th Artios Awards
- 1992 – 9th Artios Awards
- 1991 – 8th Artios Awards
- 1990 – 7th Artios Awards
- 1989 – 6th Artios Awards
- 1988 – 5th Artios Awards
- 1987 – 4th Artios Awards
- 1986 – 3rd Artios Awards
- 1985 – 2nd Artios Awards
- 1984 – 1st Artios Awards

=== Categories ===
==== Film ====
- Animated Voice-Over Casting (1993–present)
- Big Budget Feature Casting – Comedy (1985–present)
- Big Budget Feature Casting – Drama (1985–present)
- Studio or Independent – Comedy
- Studio or Independent – Drama
- Low Budget – Comedy Or Drama
- Micro Budget – Comedy or Drama

==== Television ====
- Comedy Episodic Casting (1985–present)
- Dramatic Episodic Casting (1985–present)
- Movie of the Week Casting (1985–present)
- Mini-Series Casting (1985–present)
- Daytime Casting (1986–1996)
- Soaps Casting (1989–present)
- Pilot Casting (1991–present)
- Animated Voice-Over Casting (1993–present)
- Nighttime Special Casting (1993–present)
- Comedy Pilot Casting (1996–present)
- Dramatic Pilot Casting (1996–present)
- Daytime Special Casting (1996–present)

==== Theatre ====
- Theatre Casting – Plays (1988–present)
- Theatre Casting – Musical (1988–present)

==== Miscellaneous ====
- Lifetime Achievement Award (1995–present)

== 1st Artios Awards ==
1985 Artios Awards for the calendar year 1984 – October 30, 1985.

Winners and nominees

| Category | Winner | Other Nominees |
|---|---|---|
| Feature Film Casting | Amadeus, Mary Goldberg | • Sixteen Candles, Jackie Burch • A Soldier's Story, Reuben Cannon • The Natural, Ellen Chenoweth • Adventures of Buckaroo Bonzai, Terry Liebling |
| Comedy Episodic Casting | Cheers, Steve Kolzak & Lori Openden | • Night Court, Eileen Knight • Kate & Allie, Lynn Kresel & Geoffrey Johnson • Newhart, Molly Lopata • Brothers, Helen Mossler & Marry Ann Barton |
| Dramatic Episodic Casting | (TIE); Cagney & Lacey, Diane Dimeo; Hill Street Blues, Lori Openden & Simon Ayer | • St. Elsewhere, Eugene Blythe • Call to Glory, Carol Dudley • Dynasty, Gary Shaffer & Mark Schwartz |
| Mini-Series or Movie of the Week Casting | Fatal Vision, Karen Hendel | • The First Olympics, Fran Bascom • Heartsounds, Eve Brandstein • The Burning Bed, Ross Brown & Marry West • Something About Amelia, Lynn Stalmaster & Toni Toward |

== 2nd Artios Awards ==
1986 Artios Awards for the calendar year 1985 – October 29, 1986, except for Episodic Television which was June 1, 1985, to May 31, 1986, and short order series aired between January 1, 1985, and May 31, 1985.

Winners and nominees

| Category | Winner | Other Nominees |
|---|---|---|
| Feature Film Casting – Comedy | Prizzi's Honor, Alixe Gordon | • Desperately Seeking Susan, Risa Bramon & Billy Hopkins • After Hours, Mary Colquhoun • Back to the Future, Mike Fenton, Jane Feinberg & Judy Taylor • The Purple Rose of Cairo, Juliet Taylor |
| Feature Film Casting – Drama | The Color Purple, Reuben Cannon | • Mask, Jackie Burch • Witness, Dianne Crittenden • Silverado, Wally Nicita •Cocoon, Penny Perry & Beverly McDermott |
| Daytime Casting | (TIE); All My Children, Joan D'Incecco; One Life to Live, Mary JoSlater | • Santa Barbara, Reuben Cannon, Ruth Conforte, Eileen Knight & Barbara Claman • General Hospital, Marvin Paige • The Young & the Restless, Tom Palmer |
| Comedy Episodic Casting | Night Court, Gilda Stratton | • The Cosby Show, Julie Hughes, Barry Moss, & Peter Golden • Kate & Allie, Lynn Kressel • Newhart, Molly Lopata • All is Forgiven, Lori Openden ("Pilot"), Randy Stone (series) • Cheers, Randy Stone |
| Dramatic Episodic Casting | St. Elsewhere, Eugene Blythe | • Moonlighting, Reuben Cannon ("Pilot"), Carol Dudley (series) • Cagney & Lacey, Diane Dimeo • The Equalizer, Lois Planco • Hill Street Blues, Sally Powers |
| Movie of the Week Casting | Love Is Never Silent, Mary Colquhoun | • Toughlove, Ross Brown & Mary West • Do You Remember Love, Nancy Foy • The Execution of Raymond Graham, Marsha Kleinman • Surviving, Marsha Kleinman & Kathleen Letterie |
| Mini-Series Casting | The Atlanta Child Murders, Marsha Kleinman & Kathleen Letterie | • Wallenberg: A Hero's Story, Eleanor Cooke • North & South, Book I, Phyliss Hufman & Jennifer Jackson Part • The Long Hot Summer, Marsha Kelinman & Kathleen Letterie • Space, Lynn Stalmaster & David Rubin |

== 3rd Artios Awards ==
1987 Artios Awards for the calendar year 1986 – October 30, 1987, except for Episodic Television which was June 1, 1986, to May 31, 1987, and short order series aired between January 1, 1986, and May 31, 1986.

Winners and nominees

| Category | Winner | Other Nominees |
|---|---|---|
| Feature Film Casting – Comedy | Hannah and Her Sisters, Juliet Taylor | • Something Wild, Risa Bramon, Billy Hopkins • Down and Out in Beverly Hills, Ellen Chenoweth • Ruthless People, Ellen Chenoweth • Little Shop of Horrors, Margery Simkin |
| Feature Film Casting – Drama | Platoon, Pat Golden & Bob Morones | • At Close Range, Risa Bramon, Billy Hopkins • Aliens, Mike Fenton, Jane Feinberg & Judy Taylor • Stand By Me, Jane Jenkins, Janet Hirshenson • Blue Velvet, Johanna Ray, Pat Golden |
| Daytime Casting | Babies Having Babies, Marc Hirschfeld | • Santa Barbara, Barbara Claman • All My Children, Joan D'Incecco • Have You Tried Talking to Patty?, Patricia Mock • Are You My Mother?, Barbara Remsen |
| Comedy Episodic Casting | The Days of Nights of Molly Dodd, Meg Liberman | • Designing Women, Fran Mascom • The Cavanaughs, Susan Bluestein & Renee Rousselot • Night Court, Harriet B. Helberg • Married... with Children, Marc Hirschfeld • Newhart, Molly Lopata |
| Dramatic Episodic Casting | L.A. Law, Nan Dutton ("Pilot") Robert W. Harbin (series) | • St. Elsewhere, Eugene Blythe • Cagney & Lacey, Diane Dimeo • The Equalizer, Lois Planco • Hill Street Blues, Sally Powers |
| Movie of the Week Casting | Nobody's Child, Mary Colquhoun | • Mrs. Delafield Wants to Marry, John Conwell • Unnatural Causes, Mike Fenton, Jane Feinberg & Judy Taylor • Promise, Marsha Kleinman • Resting Place, Marsha Kleinman • Alex: The Life of a Child, Meg Simon, Fran Kumin |
| Mini-Series Casting | A Year in the Life, Debra Rubinstein | • Blood & Orchids, Melinda Gartzman • The Deliberate Stranger, Melinda Gartzman • Anastasia, Lynn Kressel • Fresno, Molly Lopata |

== 4th Artios Awards ==
1988 Artios Awards for the calendar year 1987 – October 26, 1988

Winners and nominees

| Category | Winners | Other Nominees |
|---|---|---|
| Feature Film Casting – Comedy | Moonstruck, Howard Feuer | • Baby Boom, Pam Dixon • Broadcast News, Ellen Chenoweth • The Princess Bride, Jane Jenkins, Janet Hirshenson • Radio Days, Juliet Taylor |
| Feature Film Casting – Drama | The Last Emperor, Joanna Merlin | • Fatal Attraction, Risa Bramon, Billy Hopkins • Gaby – A True Story, Johanna Ray •The Big Easy, Lynn Stalmaster, David Rubin • Weeds, Cathy Henderson, Barbara Hanley |
| Daytime Casting | Just a Regular Kid: An AIDS Story, Barbara Remsen | • All My Children, Joan D'Incecco • As the World Turns, Phyllis Kasha, Vince Liebhart • Paul Reiser – Out On a Whim, Jeff Greenberg • Santa Barbara, Barbara Claman • Pee-wee's Playhouse, Diane Dimeo |
| Comedy Episodic Casting | The Wonder Years, Mary V. Buck, Susan Edelman | • Cheers, Jeff Greenberg • The Days and Nights of Molly Dodd, Meg Liberman, Marc Hirschfeld • Frank's Place, Deborah Barylski • The 'Slap' Maxwell Story, Meg Liberman, Marc Hirschfeld |
| Dramatic Episodic Casting | thirtysomething, Judith Holstra, Marcia Ross | • Beauty and the Beast, Vicki Rosenberg ("Pilot"), Joyce Robinson & Penny Ellers (series) • L.A. Law, Robert W. Harbin • St. Elsewhere, Eugene Blythe • Wiseguy, Victoria Burrows ("Pilot"), Vicki Huff (series) |
| Movie of the Week Casting | LBJ, Judith Holstra, Marcia Ross | • Baby Girl Scott, Mary V. Buck, Susan Edelman • The Betty Ford Story, Phyllis Huffman, Christopher Gorman • Daddy, Susan Bluestein • Sworn to Silence, Marc Schwartz, Vicki Huff |
| Mini-Series Casting | Nutcracker: Money, Madness, Murder, Kathleen Letterie, Christopher Gorman | • Amerika, Carol Dudley • Billionaire Boys Club, Mike Fenton, Judy Taylor • Echoes in the Darkness, Marc Schwartz • Murder Ordained, Barbara Claman |
| Theatre Casting – Plays | Fences, Meg Simon, Fran Kumin | • Breaking the Code, Julie Hughes, Barry Moss • Coastal Disturbances, Meg Simon, Fran Kumin • Elektra By Ezra Pound, Ellen Novack • The Boys Next Door, Pat McCorkle |
| Theatre Casting — Musical | Les Miserables, Geoffrey Johnson (Broadway), Vincent G. Liff & Andrew Zerman | • Anything Goes, Risa Bramon, Billy Hopkins • Dreamgirls, (Revival) Geoffrey Johnson, Vincent G. Liff • Les Miserables, (1st National Co.) Geoffrey Johnson, Vincent G. Liff & Andrew Zerman • Me and My Girl, Geoffrey Johnson, Vincent G. Liff & Andrew Zerman • Starlight Express, Geoffrey Johnson, Vincent G. Liff |

== 5th Artios Awards ==
1989 Artios Awards for the calendar year 1988 – October 25, 1989.

Winners and nominees

| Category | Winners | Other Nominees |
|---|---|---|
| Feature Film Casting – Comedy | Bagdad Cafe, Al Onorato, Jerold Franks | • Big, Juliet Taylor, Paula Herold • Crossing Delancey, Meg Simon, Fran Kumin • Married to the Mob, Howard Feuer • Working Girl, Juliet Taylor |
| Feature Film Casting – Drama | Mississippi Burning, Howard Feuer, Juliet Taylor | • Dominick & Eugene, Julie Hughes, Barry Moss • Field of Dreams, Margery Simkin • Mystic Pizza, Jane Jenkins, Janet Hirschenson • Tucker: The Man and His Dream, Jane Jenkins, Janet Hirshenson |
| Daytime Casting | Matter of Conscience, Julie Hughes, Barry Moss | • 15 and Getting Straight, Brabra Remsen • No Means No, Meg Liberman, Marc Hirschfeld • Pee wee's playhouse christmas special, Diane Dimeo • Torn Between Two Fathers, Barbara Remsen |
| Daytime Casting – Plays | M. Butterfly, Meg Simon, Fran Kumin | • The Birthday Party, Ellen Novack • The Cherry Orchard, Risa Bramon, Billy Hopkins • Eastern Standard, John Lyons, Donna Isaacson • Lend Me a Tenor, Geoffrey Johnson, Vincent Liff, Andrew Zerman & Tara Rubin |
| Soaps Casting | All My Children, Joan D'Incecco | • As the World Turns, Vince Liebhart • General Hospital, Marvin Paige • Santa Barbara, Barbara Claman • One Life to Live, Annamaire Kostura |
| Comedy Episodic Casting | Murphy Brown, Phyliss Huffman ("Pilot"), Andrea Cohen (series) | • Cheers, Jeff Greenberg • Designing Women, Fran F. Brascom • Roseanne, ("Pilot") Risa Bramon, Susan Edelman |
| Dramatic Episodic Casting | Wiseguy, Vicki Huff | • China Beach, Phyliss Huffman, John Levey • The Equalizer, Lois Planco • L.A. Law, Robert W. Harbin • Midnight Caller, Jacklynn Briskey |
| Movie of the Week Casting | Day One, Marsha Kleinman | • Bridge to Silence, Victoria Burrows • God Bless the Child, Wendy Kurtzman • Home Fires Burning, Marsha Kleinman • Unconquered, Renee Rousselot |
| Mini-Series Casting | Lonesome Dove, Lynn Kressel | • I Know My Name Is Steven, Alice Cassidy • The Murder of Mary Phagan, Howard Feuer • War and Remembrance, Fern Champion, Pamela Basker • The Women of Brewster Place, Eileen Knight |
| Theatre Casting – Musical | Into the Woods, (National Co.), Joanna Merlin | • Les Miserables, (National Co. III), Geoffrey Johnson, Vincent Liff, Andrew Zerman & Tara Rubin • Les Mierables, (LA Co.), Geoffrey Johnson, Vincent Liff, Andrew Zerman & Tara Rubin • The Phantom of the Opera, (NY Co.), Geoffrey Johnson, Vincent Liff, Andrew Zerman & Tara Rubin • The Phantom of the Opera, (LA Co.), Geoffrey Johnson, Vincent Liff, Andrew Zerman & Tara Rubin |

== 6th Artios Awards ==
1990 Artios Awards for the calendar year 1989 – October 31, 1990.

Winners and nominees

| Category | Winner | Other Nominees |
|---|---|---|
| Feature Film Casting – Comedy | Parenthood, Jane Jenkins, Jane HIrshenson | • House Party, Eileen Knight • The Little Mermaid, Mary V. Buck, Susan Edelman • The War of the Roses, David Rubin • When Harry Met Sally..., Jane Jenkins, Janet Hirshenson |
| Feature Film Casting – Drama | Dead Poets Society, Howard Feuer | • Born on the Fourth of July, Risa Bramon, Billy Hopkins • Enemies, A Love Story, Ellen Chenoweth • Glory, Mary Colquhoun • Longtime Companion, Jason LaPadura, Natalie Hart • sex, lies and videotape, Deborah Aquila |
| Daytime Casting | Pee Wee's Playhouse, Bob Harbin | • Divorce Court, Lori Cobe, Ruth Conforte • Over the Limit, Elissa Myers • Saved by the Bell, Shana landsburg ("Pilot"), Robin Lippin (series) |
| Soaps Casting | Santa Barbara, Pam Pilifroni | • All My Children, Joan D'Incecco • As the World Turns, Vince Liebhart • Guiding Light, Betty Rea • One Life to Live, Natalie Hart |
| Comedy Episodic Casting | Murphy Brown, Andrea Cohen | • Designing Women, Fran Bascom • The Famous Teddy Z, Deborah Barylski, Camille H. Patton • Grand, Risa Bramon • The Wonder Years, Andrea Cohen |
| Dramatic Episodic Casting | Twin Peaks, Johanna Ray | • China Beach, John Levey • Equal Justice, Nan Dutton (series) • L.A. Law, Bob Harbin, Beth Hymson • Shannon's Deal, Peg Halligan |
| Movie of the Week Casting | (TIE); Murder in Mississippi, Marcia S. Ross; No Place Like Home, Mary Colquhoun | • Andre's Mother, Shirley Rich • The Final Days, Susan Bluestein • Killing in a Small Town, Mary V. Buck, Susan Edelman & Rody Kent |
| Mini-Series Casting | The Kennedys of Massachusetts, Pam Dixon | • Common Ground, Melinda Gartzman, Meg Simon & Fran Kumin • Cross Fire, Molly Lopata • Family of Spies, Marsha Kleinman • People Like Us, Geri Windsor-Fischer |
| Theatre Casting – Plays | The Piano Lesson, Meg Simon, Fran Kumin | • A Few Good Men, Pat McCorkle • Lettice and Lovage, Geoffrey Johnson, Andrew Zerman & Tara Rubin • Orpheus Descending, Geoffrey Johnson, Vincent Liff, Andrew Zerman & Tara Rubin • Six Degrees of Separation, Risa Bramon, Billy Hopkins |
| Theatre Casting – Musical | City of Angels, Geoffrey Johnson, Vincent G. Liff, Andrew Zerman & Tara Rubin | • Aspects of Love, Geoffrey Johnson, Vincent Liff, Andrew Zerman & Tara Rubin • Grand Hotel, Julie Hughes, Barry Moss • Gypsy, Stuart Howard, Amy Schector • Privates on Parade, Pat McCorkle, Richard Cole |

== 7th Artios Awards ==
1991 Artios Awards for the calendar year 1990 – October 17, 1991.

Winners and nominees

| Category | Winners | Other Nominees |
|---|---|---|
| Feature Film Casting – Comedy | Home Alone, Janet Hirshenson, Jane Jenkins | • Alice, Juliet Taylor • Dick Tracy, Jackie Burch • The Freshman, Mike Fenton, Judy Taylor & Lynda Gordon • Postcards from the Edge, Juliet Taylor |
| Feature Film Casting – Drama | Dances with Wolves, Elisabeth Leustig | • Avalon, Ellen Chenoweth • The Grifters, Juliet Taylor • Miller's Crossing, Donna Isaacson, John Lyons • Reversal of Fortune, Howard Feuer • The Silence of the Lambs, Howard Feuer |
| Daytime Casting | It's Only Rock & Roll, Elissa Meyers | • But He Loves Me, Barbara Remsen • Pee Wee's Playhouse, Robert Harbin • Ralph S. Mouse, Barbara Remsen • Stories From Growing Up, Meg Liberman, Marc Hirschfeld |
| Soaps Casting | All My Children, Joan D'Incecco | • Another World, Geoffrey Johnson • As the World Turns, Vince Liebhart • Guiding Light, Betty Rea • Loving, Liz Woodman • Santa Barbara, Pam Polifroni |
| Comedy Episodic Casting | Seinfeld, Meg Liberman, Marc HIrschfeld | • Cheers, Jeff Greenberg • Evening Shade, Fran F. Bascom • Murphy Brown, Andrea Cohen • Roseanne, Karen Vice |
| Dramatic Episodic Casting | Law & Order, Lynn Kressel | • China Beach, John Levey • Equal Justice, Barbara Claman, Donna Anderson • L.A. Law, Ronnie Yeskel • Northern Exposure, Megan Branman, Patti Kalles |
| Movie of the Week Casting | The Josephine Baker Story, Carol Dudley | • Criminal Justice, Lynn Kressel • Decoration Day, Marsha Kleinman • Lucky Day, Wendy Kurtzman • Sarah, Plain and Tall, Marsha Kleinman |
| Mini-Series Casting | Separate But Equal, Alixe Gordon | • An Inconvenient Woman, Holly Powel • Love, Lies and Murder, Molly Lopata • Son of the Morning Star, Judith Holstra • Switched at Birth, Randy Stone |
| Pilot Casting | Northern Exposure, Megan Branman, Patti Kalles & Lynn Kressel | • Beverly Hills, 90210, Joanna Ray • Seinfeld, Meg Liberman, Marc Hirschfeld • Sister, Irene Mariano • W.I.O.U., Peter Golden |
| Theatre Casting – Play | Lost in Yonkers, Jay Binder | • Arturo Ui, Ellen Novak • The Good Times Are Killing Me, Meg Simon La Bete, Meg Simon • Stand Up Tragedy, Geoffrey Johnson, Vincent Liff, Andrew Zerman & Sharon Bialy • The Vortex, Stanley Soble |
| Theatre Casting – Musical | Miss Saigon, Geoffrey Johnson, Vincent Liff, Andrew Zerman & Tara Rubin | • Jelly's Last Jam, Stanley Soble • The Phantom of the Opera, (National Co.), Geoffrey Johnson, Vincent Liff, Andrew Zerman & Tara Rubin • You Never Know, Tracy Lilienfield • The Will Rogers Follies, Julie Hughes, Barry Moss |

== 8th Artios Awards ==
1992 Artios Awards for the calendar year 1991 – October 20, 1992.

Winners and nominees

| Category | Winner | Other Nominees |
|---|---|---|
| Feature Film Casting – Comedy | The Fisher King, Howard Feuer | • The Addams Family, David Rubin • City Slickers, Pam Dixon • Sister Act, Judy Taylor, Lynda Gordon, Geoffrey Johnson, Vincent Liff, Andrew Zerman • This Is My Life, Juliet Taylor |
| Feature Film Casting – Drama | Fried Green Tomatoes, David Rubin | • Barton Fink, Donna Isaacson, John Lyons • Bugsy, Ellen Chenoweth • JKF, Judy Taylor, Lynda Gordon, Geoffrey Johnson, Vincent Liff & Andrew Zerman • The Waterdance, Pam Dixon |
| Daytime Casting | Please God, I'm Only 17, Barbara Remsen | • Adventures in Wonderland, Robert J. Ulrich • Dedicated to the One I Love, Stanley W. Carr • In the Shadow of Love – A Teen Aids Story, Stuart Howard, Amy Schecter |
| Soaps Casting | (TIE); All My Children, Joan D'Incecco; One Life to Live, Ellen Novack | • General Hospital, Mark Tescher • Guiding Light, Betty Rea • Loving, Liz Woodman • Santa Barbara, Pam Polifroni |
| Comedy Episodic Casting | Seinfeld, Meg Liberman, Marc Hirschfeld | • Cheers, Jeff Greenberg • Dream On, Tracy Lilienfeld, Cheryl Bayer • Murphy Brown, Andrea Cohen • Roseanne, Karen Vice |
| Dramatic Episodic Casting | Northern Exposure, Megan Branman, Patti Kalles | • Homefront, Irene Mariano • I'll Fly Away, Jay Binder • Law & Order, Lynn Kressel |
| Movie of the Week Casting | O Pioneers!, Marsha Kleinman | • A Marriage: Georgia O'Keeffe and Alfred Steiglitz, Meg Simon • Afterburn, Molly Lopata • Guilty Until Proven Innocent, Molly Lopata • Taking Back My Life: The Nancy Ziegenmeyer Story, Marcia Ross • Wildflower, Wendy Kurtzman |
| Mini-Series Casting | Cruel Doubt, Francine Maisler | • Burden of Proof, Barbara Claman • In a Child's Name, Junie Lowry Johnson • Trial, Francine Maisler |
| Pilot Casting | I'll Fly Away, Melinda Gartzman, Jay Binder | • Civil Wars, Junie Lowry Johnson • Homefront, Irene Mariano • Home Improvement, Deborah Barylski • Tales From the Crypt, Robi Reed |
| Theatre Casting – Play | Two Trains Running, Meg Simon | • Dancing at Lughnasa, Julie Hughes, Barry Moss • Four Baboons Adoring the Sun, Daniel Swee • Marvin's Room, Daniel Swee • The Substance of Fire, Daniel Swee • Three Sisters, Elissa Myers |
| Theatre Casting – Musical | Guys & Dolls, (National Co.), Geoffrey Johnson, Vincent Liff, Andrew Zerman & Tara Rubin | • Crazy for You, Julie Hughes, Barry Moss • Five Guys Named Moe, Geoffrey Johnson, Vincent Liff, Andrew Zerman & Tara Rubin • Jelly's Last Jam, Julie Hughes, Barry Moss & Stanley Soble • Nick and Nora, Stuart Howard, Amy Schecter |

== 9th Artios Awards ==
1993 Artios Awards for the calendar year 1992 – October 19, 1993.

Winners and nominees

| Category | Winner | Other Nominees |
|---|---|---|
| Feature Film Casting – Comedy | A League of Their Own, Ellen Lewis, Amanda Mackey | • Honeymoon in Vegas, Mike Fenton • Husbands and Wives, Juliet Taylor • Mr. Saturday Night, Pam Dixon • Used People, Mary Colquhoun |
| Feature Film Casting – Drama | Malcolm X, Robi Reed | • A River Runs Through It, Elisabeth Leustig • Chaplin, Mike Fenton • Scent of a Woman, Ellen Lewis • School Ties, Pat McCorkle, Lisa Beach |
| Daytime Casting | Crosses On the Lawn, Lisa London | • Becky Bell, Public Law 106, Pat McCorkle • Big Boys Don't Cry, Barbara Remsen • The Parsley Garden, Jerold Franks |
| Soaps Casting | One Life to Live, Ellen Novack | • Another World, Geoffrey Johnson, Vincent Liff & Tara Rubin • As the World Turns, Vince Lieberhart • General Hospital, Mark Teschner • Guiding Light, Betty Rea |
| Comedy Episodic Casting | Seinfeld, Meg Leiberman, Marc Hirschfeld | • Cheers, Jeff Greenberg • Dream On, Tracy Lilienfeld • The Larry Sanders Show, Meg Lieberman, Marc Hirschfeld & Michael Katcher • Murphy Brown, Andrea Cohen |
| Dramatic Episodic Casting | Tribeca, Bonnie Finnegan | • I'll Fly Away, Theodore Hann, Jay Binder • Law & Order, Lynn Kressel, Suzanne Ryan • Northern Exposure, Megan Branman • Picket Fences, Sharon Bialy, Debi Manwiller & Rick Pagono |
| Movie of the Week Casting | Citizen Cohn, Mary Colquhoun | • Barbarians at the Gate, Marsha Kleinman • Blind Spot, Lynn Kressel • Crazy in Love, Anne Benson • Mastergate, Meg Liberman, Marc HIrschfeld • The Positively True Adventures of the Alleged Texas Cheerleader-Murdering Mom, Sharon Bialy, Debi Manwiller & Rick Pagano |
| Mini-Series Casting | Murder in the Heartland, Molly Lopata | • Family Pictures, Lynn Kressel • Queen, Susan Bluestein • Sinatra, Marcia Ross, Robert Litvak • Wild Palms, Sharon Bialy, Debi Manwiller & Rick Pagano |
| Pilot Casting | The Larry Sanders Show, Francine Maisler, Meg Leiberman & Marc Hirschfeld | • Middle Ages, Francine Maisler • Picket Fences, Debi Manwiller, Sharon Bialy & Rick Pagano • Sirens, Judith Hostra, Nikki Valko • The Untouchables, Mike Fenton, Jane Alderman |
| Nighttime Special Casting | Greatest Performances' 20th Anniversary Special, Elissa Myers | —N/a |
| Animated Voice-Over Casting | Bebe's Kids, Eileen Knight | —N/a |
| Theatre Casting – Play | Angels in America, Meg Simon, Stanley Soble | • Anna Christy, Pat McCorkle, Richard Cole • Jeffrey, Geoffrey Johnson, Vincent Liff, Andrew Zerman & Tara Rubin • One Shoe Off, Meg Simon • The Sisters Rosenweig, Daniel Swee |
| Theatre Casting – Musical | Kiss of the Spider Woman, Geoffrey Johnson, Vincent Liff, Andrew Zerman & Tara Rubin | • Falsettos, (Nat'l Tour), Stuart Howard, Amy Schecter • Guys & Dolls, (1st Nat'l Co.), Geoffrey Johnson, Vincent Liff, Andrew Zerman & Tara Rubin • My Favorite Year, Daniel Swee • The Who's Tommy, (La Jolla Playhouse Prod.), Geoffrey Johnson, Vincent Liff, Tara Rubin & Brian Chavanne |

== 10th Artios Awards ==
1994 Artios Awards for the calendar year 1993 – October 20, 1994.

Winners and nominees

| Category | Winners | Other Nominees |
|---|---|---|
| Feature Film Casting – Comedy | Sleepless in Seattle, Juliet Taylor | • Angie, Juliet Taylor • Cool Runnings, Chemin Sylvia Bernard • Mrs. Doubtfire, Janet Hirschenson, Jane Jenkins • The Hudsucker Proxy, Donna Isaacson, John Lyons • The Ref, Howard Feuer |
| Feature Film Casting – Drama | The Joy Luck Club, Heidi Levitt, Risa Bramon | • A Bronx Tale, Ellen Chenoweth • Philadelphia, Howard Feuer • Searching for Bobby Fischer, Avy Kaufman • What's Love Got To Do With It, Reuben Cannon |
| Daytime Casting | Other Mothers, Mary Buck, Susan Edelman | • Running in the Halls, Meg Liberman, Marc Hirschfeld & Michael Katcher |
| Soaps Casting | As the World Turns, Vince Liebhart | • All My Children, Judy Blye Wilson • Days of Our Lives, Fran Brascom • General Hospital, Mark Tescher • One Life to Live, Ellen Novack |
| Comedy Episodic Casting | Frasier, Jeff Greenberg | • Dream On, Tracy Lilienfield • Murphy Brown, Andrea Cohen • Seinfeld, Meg Liberman, Marc Hirschfeld • The Larry Sanders Show, Meg Liberman, Marc Hirschfeld |
| Dramatic Episodic Casting | NYPD Blue, Junie Lowry-Johnson, Alexa Fogel | • Birdland, Risa Bramon, Juel Bestrop • Law & Order, Lynn Kressel, Suzanne Ryan • Northern Exposure, Megan Branman • Picket Fences, Rick Pagano, Sharon Bialy & Debi Manwiller • The X-Files, Rick Millikan, Lynne Carrow |
| Movie of the Week Casting | And the Band Played On, Judith Holstra, Nikki Valko | • A Place for Annie, Phyllis Huffman • Against the Wall, Mary Buck, Susan Edelman • David's Mother, Reuben Cannon • Gypsy, David Rubin, Stuart Howard, Amy Schecter • To Dance with the White Dog, Judith Holstra, Nikki Valko |
| Mini-Series Casting | The Stand, Lynn Kressel | • In The Best of Families, Mary Buck, Susan Edelman • J.F.K.: Reckless Youth, Wendy Kurzman • Menendez: A Killing in Beverly Hills, Susan Bluestein, Donna Ekholdt • The Oldest Living Confederate Widow Tells All, Susan Bluestein, Donna Ekholdt |
| Pilot Casting | NYPD Blue, Junie Lowry-Johnson, Alexa Fogel | • Bakersfield, P.D., Meg Liberman, Marc Hirschfeld • Frasier, Jeff Greenberg • Lois & Clark: The Adventures of Superman, Ellie Kanner, Geraldine Leder • The Jon Larroquette Show, Francine Maisler |
| Nighttime Special Casting | Kids Killing Kids, Babara Remsen | • Basic Values: Sex, Shock & Censorship in the '90s, Meg Liberman, Marc Hirschfeld • Count on Me, Patrica Mock |
| Animated Voice-Over Casting | Eek the Cat, Alice Cassidy | • A Cool Like That Christmas, Anthony Sepulveda, Geraldine Leder |
| Theatre Casting – Play | Suburbia, Daniel Swee | • An Inspector Calls, Julie Hughes, Barry Moss & Jessica Gilburne • Broken Glass, Jay Binder • Laughter on the 23rd Floor, Stuart Howard, Amy Shecter & Jay Binder • Picnic, Pat McCorkle |
| Theatre Casting – Musical | Carousel, Daniel Swee | • Beauty and the Beast, Jay Binder • Damn Yankees, Jay Binder • Fiorello!, Jay Binder • Hello Again, Daniel Swee • She Loves Me, Pat McCorkle, Richard Cole • Sunset Boulevard, (LA Co.), Geoffrey Johnson, Vincent Liff, Andrew Zerman & Tara Rubin |

== 11th Artios Awards ==
1995 Artios Awards for the calendar year 1994 – October 11, 1995.

Winners and nominees

| Category | Winner | Other Nominees |
|---|---|---|
| Feature Film Casting – Comedy | Bullets over Broadway, Juliet Taylor | • Miami Rhapsody, Renee Rousselot • The Brady Bunch Movie, Debora Aquila, Jane Shannon • The Mask, Fern Champion, Mark Paladini • While You Were Sleeping, Amanda Mackey, Cathy Dandrich |
| Feature Film Casting – Drama | Pulp Fiction, Ronnie Yeskel, Gary Zuckerbrod | • Forrest Gump, Ellen Lewis • Little Women, Carrie Frazier, Shani Ginsberg • My Family/Mi Familia, Janet Hirshenson, Jane Jenkins & Roger Mussenden • The Shawshank Redemption, Deborah Aquila |
| Daytime Casting | Spring Awakening, Holly Powell | • A Promise Kept: The Oksana Baiul Story, Holly Powell, Lynn Kressel & Shari Rhodes • Boys Will Be Boys, Meg Liberman, Marc Hirschfeld • Storytime, Bob Morones • Trick of the Eye, Holly Powell |
| Soaps Casting | All My Children, Judy Blye Wilson | • Another World, Geoffrey Johnson, Vincent Liff & Tara Rubin • General Hospital, Mark Teschner • Guiding Light, Betty Rea • One Life to Live, Ellen Novack |
| Comedy Episodic Casting | Frasier, Jeff Greenberg | • Ellen, Tammara Billik, Justine Jacoby • Murphy Brown, Andrea Cohen • Seinfeld, Meg Liberman, Marc Hirschfeld • The Larry Sanders Show, Meg Liberman, Marc Hirschfeld |
| Dramatic Episodic Casting | ER, John Levey | • Chicago Hope, Steven Jacobs • My So-Called Life, Jeff Greenberg • Law & Order, Lynn Kressel, Suzanne Ryan • NYPD Blue, Junie Lowry Johnson, Alexa Fogel, Susan Bluestein & Donna Eckholdt |
| Movie of the week Casting | Serving in Silence: The Margarethe Cammermeyer Story, Valorie Massalas | • Kingfish, Mindy Marin, John Papsidera • My Antonia, Dan Shaner • The Burning Season, Junie Lowry Johnson • The Good Old Boys, Jason La Padura, Natalie Hart |
| Mini-Series Casting | Naomi & Wynonna: Love Can Build a Bridge, Molly Lopata | • 500 Nations, Elizabeth Leustig • A Woman of Independent Means, Wendy Kurtzman • Buffalo Girls, Francine Maisler • Liz: The Elizabeth Taylor Story, Holly Powell |
| Pilot Casting | ER, John Levey | • Friends, Ellie Kanner • Hope & Gloria, Anthony Sepulveda • NewsRadio, Meg Leiberman, Marc Hirschfeld • Party of Five, Mary Buck, Susan Edelman |
| Nighttime Special Casting | In Search of Dr. Seuss, Gary Oberst | • Cosmic Slop, Eileen Mack Knight • Dottie Gets Spanked, Steven Jacobs • Attack of the 5 Ft. 2 In. Women, Gary Oberst |
| Animated Voice-Over Casting | The Lion King, Brian Chavanne | • Eek the Cat, Alice Cassidy • Happily Ever After: Fairy Tales for Every Child, Eileen Mack Knight • The Swan Princess, Geoffrey Johnson, Vincent Liff & Tara Rubin |
| Theatre Casting – Play | The Heiress, Daniel Swee | • Arcadia, Daniel Swee • Hapgood, Daniel Swee • Indiscretions, Geoffrey Johnson, Vincent Liff & Tara Rubin • The Rose Tattoo, Stuart Howard, Amy Schecter |
| Theatre Casting – Musical | Showboat, (Broadway Co.), Arnold J. Mungioli | • Beauty and the Beast, (LA Co.), Jay Binder, Mark Simon • Chronicle of a Death Foretold, Daniel Swee • Sunset Boulevard, (Broadway Co.), Geoffrey Johnson, Vincent Liff & Tara Rubin |

Lifetime Achievement Award: Garry Marshall (recipient)

== 12th Artios Awards ==
1996 Artios Awards for the calendar year 1995 – October 15, 1996.

Winners and nominees

| Category | Winners | Other Nominees |
|---|---|---|
| Feature Film Casting – Comedy | Fargo, John Lyons | • Flirting With Disaster, Ellen Parks, Risa Bramon • Get Shorty, David Rubin, Debra Zane • Mighty Aphrodite, Juliet Taylor • The Birdcage, Juliet Taylor, Ellen Lewis • To Die For, Howard Feurer |
| Feature Film Casting – Drama | The Usual Suspects, Francine Maisler | • Apollo 13, Jane Jenkins, Janet Hirshenson • Mr. Holland's Opus, Sharon Bialy • Nixon, Heidi Levitt • Primal Fear, Deborah Aquila, Jane Shannon Smith |
| Soaps Casting | General Hospital, Mark Teschner | • All My Children, Judy Blye Wilson • Days of Our Lives, Fran Bascom • One Life to Live, Sonia Nikore • The City, Julie Madison |
| Comedy Pilot Casting | 3rd Rock from the Sun, Meg Liberman, Marc Hirschfeld & Michael Katcher | • Almost Perfect, Jeff Greenberg, Shelia Guthrie • Caroline in the City, Gilda Stratton • High Society, Leslie Litt • Partners, Megan Branman |
| Comedy Episodic Casting | Frasier, Jeff Greenberg | • Friends, Leslie Litt • Seinfeld, Meg Liberman, Marc Hirschfeld • The Larry Sanders Show, Meg Liberman, Marc Hirschfeld • 3rd Rock from the Sun, Meg Liberman, Marc Hirschfeld |
| Dramatic Pilot Casting | Murder One, Junie Lowry Johnson, Alexa Fogel | • American Gothic, Meg Liberman, Marc Mirschfeld & Michael Katcher • New York News, Junie Lowry Johnson, Alexa Fogel, Jay Binder, Jack Bowdan & Theodore Hann • Profit, Lucy Cavallo • The Client, Mark Saks, Jay Binder |
| Dramatic Episodic Casting | ER, John Levey | • Chicago Hope, Debi Manwiller • Law & Order, Lynn Kressel, Suzanne Ryan • Murder One, Junie Lowry Johnson, Alexa Fogel • NYPD Blue, Junie Lowry Johnson, Alexa Fogel |
| Movie of the week Casting | Truman, Mary Colquhoun | • A Street Car Named Desire, Marsha Kleinman • The Boys Next Door, Phyliss Huffman • The Heidi Chronicles, Juel Bestrop • The Late Shift, Nancy Foy |
| Mini-Series Casting | Andersonville, Marsha Kleinman | • Gulliver's Travels, Lynn Kressel • Ruby Ridge: An America Tragedy, Jason La Padura, Natalie Hart • Streets of Laredo, Lynn Kressel • The Buccaneers, Mary Colquhoun |
| Daytime Special Casting | Daddy's Girl, Elissa Meyers, Paul Fouquet | • Crosstown, Meg Liberman, Marc Hrischfeld • Educating Mom, Meg Liberman, Marc Hirschfeld • Fast Forward, Barbara Remsen |
| Nighttime Special Casting | Mr. Willowby's Christmas Tree, Mike Fenton, Allison Cowitt | • National Lampoon's Favorite Deadly Sins, Meg Liberman, Marc Hirschfeld & Patrick Rusk |
| Animated Voice-Over Casting | Pocahontas, Brian Chavanne, Ruth Lambert | • Eekstravaganza, Alice Cassidy |
| Theatre Casting – Play | A Delicate Balance, Daniel Swee | • 7 Guitars, Meg Simon • Bus Stop, Rosalie Joseph • Four Dogs and a Bone, Sharon Bialy • Holiday, Rosalie Joseph • Picasso at the Lapin Agile, Rosalie Joseph |
| Theatre Casting – Musical | The King & I, Jay Binder | • A Funny Thing Happened on the Way to the Forum, Geoffrey Johnson, Vincent Liff & Tara Rubin • Chicago, Jay Binder • Stomp, (2 touring companies), Vincent Liebhart • Victor/Victoria, Geoffrey Johnson, Vincent Liff & Tara Rubin |

Lifetime Achievement Award: David Gerber (recipient)

== 13th Artios Awards ==
1997 Artios Awards for the calendar year 1996 – November 12, 1997.

| Category | Winners | Other Nominees |
|---|---|---|
| Feature Film Casting – Drama | The People vs. Larry Flynt, Joe Doster | • Big Night, Ellen Lewis • The English Patient, David Rubin • Lone Star, Avy Kaurman, Francine Maisler • Williams Shakespeare's Romeo & Juliet, David Rubin |
| Feature Film Casting – Comedy | That Thing You Do, Howard Feuer | • Everyone Says I Love You, Juliet Taylor • The First Wives Club, Ilene Starger • Grosse Pointe Blank, Junie Lowry Johnson • Walking and Talking, Avy Kaufman |
| Animated Voice-Over Casting | The Hunchback of Notre Dame, Ruth Lambert | • Hey, Arnold!, Joey Paul |
| Mini-Series Casting | Truman Capote's in Cold Blood, Julie Selzer, Patrick Rush, Lynne Carrow | • Asteroid, Susan Edelman, Mary V. Buck • The Odyssey, Lynn Kressel • The Shining, Lynn Kressel • 20,000 Leagues Under the Sea, Victoria Huff |
| Movie of the Week Casting | Bastard Out of Carolina, Linda Lowy | • Gotti, Avy Kaufman • Grand Avenue, April Webster • The Man Who Captured Eichmann, Iris Grossman • Weapons of Mass Distraction, Gary M. Zuckerbrod |
| Dramatic Pilot Casting | EZ Streets, Nan Dutton, Jane Alderman | • Prince Street, Alice Cassidy |
| Dramatic Episodic Casting | ER, John Levey | • Chicago Hope, Debi Manwiller • Law & Order, Suzanne Ryan, Lynn Kressel • Murder One, Junie Lowry Johnson, Alexa L. Fogel • NYPD Blue, Junie Lowry Johnson, Alexa L. Fogel |
| Comedy Pilot Casting | Spin City, Bonnie Finnegan | • Everybody Loves Raymond, Lisa Miller • Just Shoot Me!, Deborah Barylski • Suddenly Susan, Anthony Sepulveda, Mark Saks • Townies, Andrea Cohen |
| Comedy Episodic Casting | Frasier, Jeff Greenberg | • Ellen, Tammara Billik • The Larry Sander Show, Meg Liberman, Marc Hirschfeld, Bonnie Zane • Seinfeld, Meg Liberman, Marc Hirschfeld • 3rd Rock from the Sun, Meg Liberman, Marc Hirschfeld |

Hoyt Bowers Award – Outstanding contribution to the Casting Profession: Juliet Taylor (recipient)

Lifetime Achievement Award: Roger Corman (recipient)
