= Gallery 400 =

- Established: 1983
- Location: 400 S Peoria, Chicago, Illinois 60607; United States
- Coordinates: 41.8765°N 87.6497°W
- Director: Lorelei Stewart
- Public transit access: UIC/Halsted Blue Line stop CTA
- Website: gallery400.aa.uic.edu

Gallery 400 is a not-for-profit arts exhibition space within the College of Architecture, Design, and the Arts at the University of Illinois at Chicago. It is located in Chicago's West Loop neighborhood.

== Concept ==
The Gallery's program of exhibitions, lectures, film and video screenings, and performances features interdisciplinary and experimental practices. Operating within the College of Architecture, Design and the Arts at the University of Illinois Chicago (UIC), Gallery 400 aims to make the arts and artists accessible to the general public.

== Exhibitions ==
Gallery 400 annually presents six to nine exhibitions in an exhibition space of 2,900 square feet (one large, main gallery and three project spaces). Gallery 400 has in recent years prioritized major solo exhibitions of women, artists of color, and mid-career artists in the Chicago region. Large commissions of new works focus on artists working across disciplines. Exhibitions in 2013 have included: It's the Political Economy, Stupid, The Program, Whisper Down the Lane, and I THINK WE'RE READY TO GO TO THE NEXT SEQUENCE: THE LEGACY OF HALFLIFERS.

Exhibitions from years past have included: Focus Pull: Onion City Off Screen, Frau Fiber: Knock Off Enterprises - the labor behind the label, Justin Cooper: Thread, Asma Kazmi: Relation-Chute, Carla Arocha: Orchid, Andy Roche: Black Iron Vatican, Leif Elggren and Carl Michael von Hausswolff: Inauguration of the Consulate General of the Kingdoms of Elgaland-Vargaland, An Atlas, I Am Eyebeam, Carol Jackson, Feel Tank Chicago: Pathogeographies (Or, Other People's Baggage), Amanda Browder and Stuart Keeler: Urban Warp / Weft sculptural research project, Captive Audience, John Arndt : Empire, Jeanne Dunning: Tomato Fight, Carter: Drawings and Polaroids.

In 2018 Gallery 400 exhibited the Chicago New Media 1973–1992. The exhibition focused on Chicago's important relationship with New Media looking at the history through time. The exhibition was curated by jonCates.

== Commissions ==
Throughout its history Gallery 400 has commissioned large-scale new works through residencies, comprising varied combinations of workshops for students, public lectures, the creation of large-scale new works, and collaborations between the artist, students, and partner community groups.
