= Jaan Patterson =

German composer and poet (born 20th century)

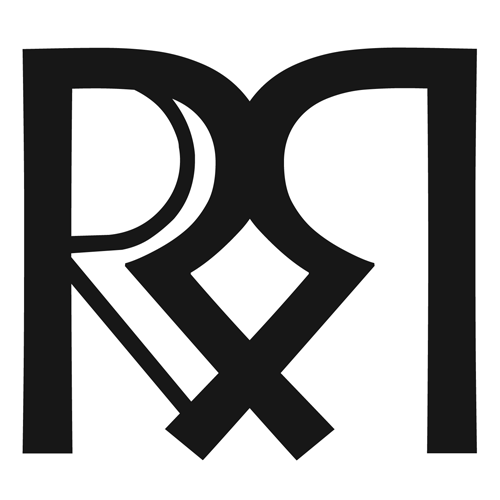
- by Jaan Patterson
- Born: Jaan Patterson; 20th century
- Known for: Computer music, video, spoken word, poetry, performance art
- Notable work: Tarentaliogy Defloration, Interiéur, Music for Shadows, Surrism Manifesto, The Dark Side of Chewing Gums
- Movement: Surrism
- Awards: Honorable Mention for WFMU and Free Music Archive's Masters Remastered

Jaan Patterson is a German composer and poet, and runs the Surrism-Phonoethics netlabel he founded in 2007.

He is known for his various Dada- and Surrealist-inspired experimental-music and spoken-word projects, including Undress Béton, André Pissoir, Crawl Max, Dusk Euphoria, and Reve Steich. Additionally, together with Goran Ivkovic, he works as Surrism on improvised music projects. Patterson's music has been played on numerous community radio stations and Internet radio stations, including Resonance FM, WFMU, Zoviet France, NTNS Radio by Mark Stolk and L'étranger, Radio Panik and In Memory of John Peel Radio.

Since 2010, Patterson, has a role as curator for WFMU's Free Music Archive. Later the same year, Patterson, started to curate, together with Anthony Donovan (Murmurists), the Classwar Karaoke netlabel, which releases quarterly compilations of experimental music and short-films by artists from around the world.

Some of his musical collaborations include Anthony Donovan & Classwar Karaoke, AG Davis,< Kommissar Hjuler & Mama Baer, Hopek Quirin, Alessandra Celletti, William Davison (Recordism), Jochen Arbeit (Einstürzende Neubauten) & Vania Rovisco, Jeremy Gluck (The Barracudas), John M. Bennett, Lee Kwo & PostVerbal, Bryan Lewis Saunders, Carmen Racovitza, J. Karl Bogartte, Leif Elggren, Dada AG, Yoshihiro Kikuchi, John Hyatt (The Three Johns), Kosta T, Bernard Dumaine, and Fake Cats Project.

== Discography ==
- Tarentaliogy Defloration (Surrism-Phonoethics 2008)
- Interiéur (Surrism-Phonoethics 2008)
- The 16,370 Character (Surrism-Phonoethics 2008)
- Postlude Presumption Architecture (Surrism-Phonoethics 2009)
- Handmade Temper (Surrism-Phonoethics 2009)
- Sat Du Pond (Surrism-Phonoethics 2010)
- Stuckhousing Quantum Gums (Surrism-Phonoethics 2010)
- Alessandra Celletti / Jaan Patterson - W.C. (Bubutz Records 2011)
- El Salmon Poseido (Surrism-Phonoethics 2013)
- Crystallization of the Quantum Availability (Surrism-Phonoethics 2014)
- Contemporary Teleportation (Surrism-Phonoethics 2014)
- Headless Poets & The Album That Composed Itself with AG Davis (Surrism-Phonoethics 2014)
- The Dark Side of Chewing Gums (Classwar Karaoke 2015)
- Music for Shadows (Surrism-Phonoethics 2015)

== Videography ==
- Surround the Gap (2008)
- Mary Exceeded Her Handkerchief (2009)
- Rejected Trust Leaves You Stained (2009)
- André Pissoir on Discussion (2010)
- EOS (2010)
- wwwArt in VIVO (2010)
- Centered Closets (2010)
- Leif Elggren & Jaan Patterson – 'Centered Envelope (Red)' (2011)
- Alessandra Celletti & Jaan Patterson – 'WC' (2011)
- Jaan Patterson and Zaro Ostrich Lunch – 'Niño Patata Erster Satz für 77 Stimmen'x'
- Jaan Patterson & Zaro Ostrich Lunch – 'Underwater Clown' (2014)

== Bibliography ==
- Surrism Manifesto (2007)
- Postverbal Manifesto (A collaboration between Lee Kwo & Jaan Patterson (2008)
- The Flourish Béton Pamphlet (2009)
- Chew Facts on Literature (2009)
- The Flourish Béton. Introduction "Jaan Patterson" (suRRism 2015)
- Geständnisse. Das Buch der Vorgeschichten "Jaan Patterson" (suRRism 2015)
- Peculiar Mormyrid. A Surrealist Journal "Peculiar Mormyrid 1.0 Spring 2015"
- Peculiar Mormyrid. A Surrealist Journal "Peculiar Mormyrid Issue 3 2016"

== See also ==
- List of German composers
- List of German poets
