= Bryan Lewis Saunders =

American artist

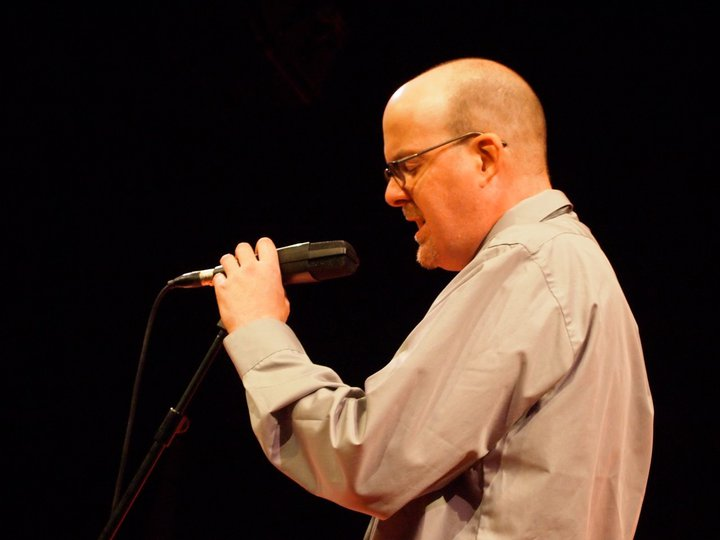
- Saunders in 2010
- Born: Bryan Lewis, Saunders; February 6, 1969 (age 57); Washington, D.C., U.S.
- Education: East Tennessee State University
- Known for: Performance Art, Stand-up tragedy, Stream of unconsciousness, Psychonautics, Sensory Deprivation, Endurance art, Drawing
- Notable work: Under the Influence, Sensations, Near Death Experience, Daku, Under the Influence of Torture, 30 Days Totally Blind, 100 Days Upside Down Vision
- Website: bryanlewissaunders.org

Bryan Lewis Saunders (born 1969 in Washington) is an endurance artist, a performance artist, videographer, performance poet, and self-portrait painter known for his disturbing spoken word rants, tragic art performances and stand-up tragedy.

== Career ==
=== Self-portraits ===
On March 30, 1995, Saunders began drawing at least one self-portrait every day for the rest of his life. For 11 days in 2001, Saunders conducted an experiment in which he ingested or inhaled a different intoxicant every day and created a self-portrait under the influence documenting the effects of his altered perception. A selection of the drug-induced self-portraits presented online would go on to become viral on social media sites including Tumblr. In an interview, he reported that his drug experimentation left him with mild brain damage involving psychomotor retardation and confusion.

On March 30, 2015, on Saunders' 20-year anniversary of drawing a self-portrait a day, the feature-length documentary Art of Darkness was released worldwide on various on-demand platforms. The film, by David Parker, is an intimate profile that includes candid interviews with Saunders and highlights of the artist's life; from troubled childhood through his various art experiments including his infamous "drug series" of self-portraits.

=== Other work ===
On May 16, 2010, Saunders performed in the Palau de la Virreina as part of the International Poetry Festival in Barcelona alongside Bibbe Hansen, Eugene S. Robinson and Lydia Lunch as "The Ugly Americans". In 2003, Saunders began sleeping with a cassette recorder and documenting both his dreams and somniloquy (sleep-talking) which led to a wealth of source material for both audio releases and books. The transcriptions of his lengthy somniloquy are an example of the stream of unconsciousness method of writing.

== Works ==
Discography (Incomplete)

- The Inner Demon Demos Vol. 1-3 (Stand-Up Tragedy Records 2006)
- Songs About Huffing (Teenage Whore Tapes 2008)
- Fur Die Hunde with Kommissar Hjuler und Frau (SHMF 2008)
- Daku: Bryan Lewis Saunders and Z'EV (Outfall Channel 2009)
- Craigslist (Anti Everything Noise 2009)
- A/Mei/Sen: Bryan Lewis Saunders mit Kommissar Hjuler und Frau (Scumbag Relations 2009)
- Der Muter Object Fur Die Hunde: Z'EV and Kommissar Hjuler und Mama Baer and Bryan Lewis Saunders (Blossoming Noise 2010)
- Near Death Experience (Erratum 2010)
- Bed Bugs 1-3 (Private Leisure Industries 2011)
- … from the world of burning red bugs with Kommissar Hjuler und Frau (Psych.KG 2017)

Sleep Works

- N1-N4 Variations: Vocal Documentation From All Four Sleep Stages (Stand-Up Tragedy Records 2008)
- Animus Chora: Spirit Receptacle (Belsona Strategic 2009)
- Torso (Colin Johnco Records 2009)
- 87 Dreams Of A Sociopath (Surrism-Phonoethics 2010)
- Le Bobcat: Bryan Lewis Saunders and Raymond Dijkstra (Fragment Factory 2010)
- Stream of Unconscious Vol. 1 with Hopi Torvald and Kommissar Hjuler und Frau (Stand-Up Tragedy Records 2011)
- Stream of Unconscious Vol. 2 with Razen and Classwar Karaoke Friends (Stand-Up Tragedy Records 2011)
- Stream of Unconscious Vol. 3 with Evil Moisture and Wehwalt (Stand-Up Tragedy Records 2011)
- Stream of Unconscious Vol. 4 with Love, Execution Style and Adam Bohman & Adrian Northover (Stand-Up Tragedy Records 2012)
- Stream of Unconscious Vol. 5 with Yoshihiro Kikuchi and Christopher Fleeger (Stand-Up Tragedy Records 2012)
- Stream of Unconscious Vol. 6 with Sinus Buds and Andy Ortmann (Stand-Up Tragedy Records 2013)
- Stream of Unconscious Vol. 7 with Joke Lanz and Dylan Nyoukis (Stand-Up Tragedy Records 2013)
- Stream of Unconscious Vol. 8 with Lee Gamble and Carl Michael von Hausswolff (Stand-Up Tragedy Records 2013)
- Stream of Unconscious Vol. 9 with Leif Elggren and John Moloney (Stand-Up Tragedy Records 2013)
- Stream of Unconscious Vol. 10 with Language of Light and Matt Reis (Stand-Up Tragedy Records 2013)
- Stream of Unconscious Vol. 11 with Offerings and Requiem (Stand-Up Tragedy Records 2013)
- Stream of Unconscious Vol. 12 with Hopek Quirin and Michael Esposito (Stand-Up Tragedy Records 2013)
- The Confessor (Stand-Up Tragedy Records 2013)

Videography

- I'm Not Dead-I'm Schizotypal (2000)
- Where's Mao Now When You Need Him? (2005)
- Sex, Drugs and Institutions (2007)
- Missing Child (2008)
- Sign It! (2008)
- Bed Bugs II (2008)
- Steve Mackay and the Radon Ensemble "Hidden Away" Live 2008 (2009)
- Slobberscope (2009)
- Near Death Experience (2010)
- Bryan Lewis Saunders & James Hollenbaugh (2012)

Bibliography

- Sex, Drugs and Institutionz (2008)
- 87 Dreams of a Sociopath (2010)
- The Reasons Why I Dream with Knives (2010)
- Channel Zero (2011)
- The Confessor (2012)
- Protective Geometry with drawings by Ed Pinsent (2012)
- Authentic Soup Kitchen Menus (2013)
- Autoportraits Sous Drogues (2013)
- Gregor Mendel Mutations (2013)
- We Don't Need Another Doctor, We Can Run Our Own Tests (2014)
- La Troisième Oreille et Autres Textes (2014)
