= Stream of unconsciousness =

Narrative device used in literature

In literary criticism, stream of unconsciousness is a narrative mode that portrays an individual's point of view by transcribing the author's unconscious dialogue or somniloquy during sleep, in connection to their actions within a dream.

Stream of unconsciousness is characterized by disjointed leaps in ideation and story line, bizarre new word creation, loss of self-censorship, one sided conversations and punctuation that can make the prose both disturbing and difficult to follow. Despite the name, the stream of unconsciousness occurs more in the form of waves than an actual continuous running stream of dialogue. The stream of unconsciousness is one of several forms of dramatic monologue, where the speaker is addressing an audience or a third person. Such monologues are commonly used in poetry and drama, but with the stream of unconsciousness, the audience or third persons are 'unknowingly' imaginary. It is primarily a fictional device and often takes the form of a tragedy. The term was introduced to the field of literary studies from that of the independent music industry, where it was defined by author and artist Bryan Lewis Saunders in 2005. For nearly a century the term has been both a misnomer and a malapropism for the stream of consciousness.

== History ==
The audio recordings of Dion McGregor (1922–1994) can be perceived as one of the precursors of the 'stream of unconsciousness' (narrative mode), although his monologues and somniloquy were never transcribed and presented as such. "Dreams" (1995) by contemporary American artist Jim Shaw is a collection of illustrations and extremely detailed dream descriptions. "Experiment with Dreams" by Leif Elggren and Thomas Liljenberg (Stockholm Feb. 1996) may also be attributed to the formation of this method.

== Notable works ==
Examples of notable works employing the stream of unconsciousness narrative mode are:

- "Le Bobcat" Bryan Lewis Saunders and Raymond Dijkstra. Short Story on Cassette (Fragment Factory 2010)
- "The Reasons Why I Dream With Knives" Bryan Lewis Saunders. Nonfiction Book (Stand-Up Tragedy 2010)
- "The Confessor" is a book on tape composed of 24 album chapters on 12 audio cassettes. With each album serving as a chapter, over 24 musicians and experimental sound artists created music for the unconscious epic poem by Bryan Lewis Saunders. "The Confessor" was created from app. 30 nights of somniloquy and dream descriptions. Poem and Book on Tape (Stand-Up Tragedy 2011)
- "Protective Geometry" Ed Pinsent and Bryan Lewis Saunders. Comic Book. (2012)
