= Dream diary =

Records of dream experiences

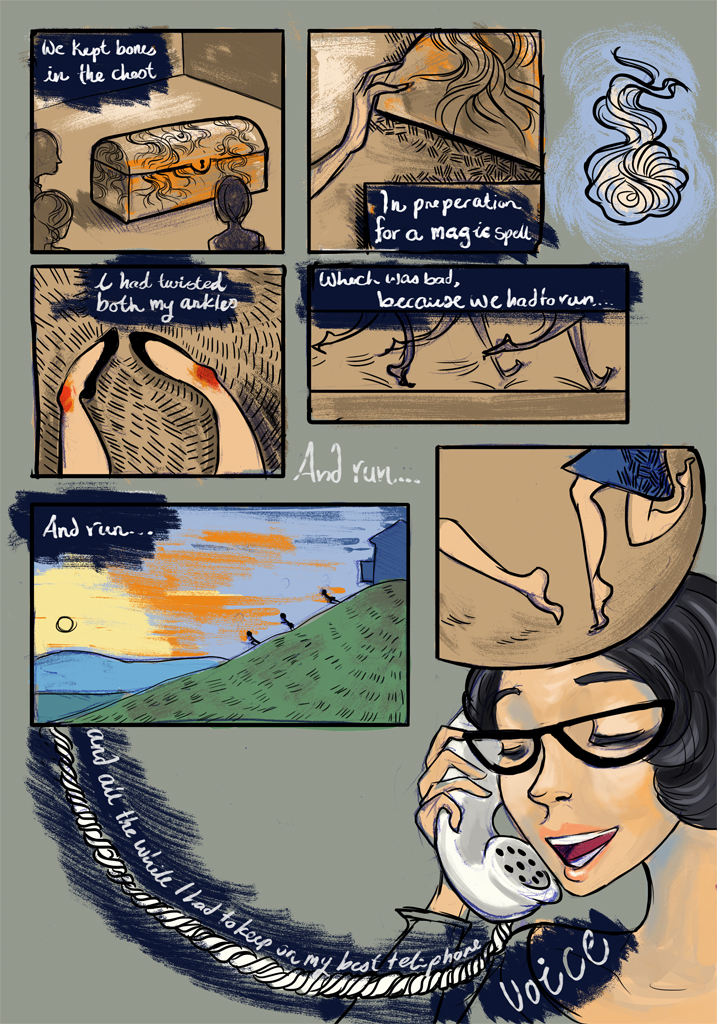
An artist's dream diary, written as a comic strip: "We kept bones in the chest, in preparation for a magic spell [...] and all the while I had to keep up my best telephone voice"

A dream diary or dream journal is a diary in which dream experiences are recorded. A dream diary might include a record of nightly dreams, personal reflections and waking dream experiences. It is often used in the study of dreams and psychology. Dream diaries are also used by some people as a way to help induce lucid dreams, and are regarded as a useful tool in improving dream recall. Keeping a dream diary conditions a person to view remembering dreams as important. Dreams can be recorded in a paper diary (as text, drawings, paintings, etc.), or via an audio recording device (as narrative, music or imitations of other auditory experiences from the dream). Many websites offer the ability to create a digital dream diary. The use of a dream diary was recommended by Ann Faraday in The Dream Game (1974) as an aid to memory and a way to preserve details, many of which are otherwise rapidly forgotten no matter how memorable the dream originally seemed.

== Lucid dreaming ==
Dream diaries are often kept by individuals striving to induce lucid dreams and improve their ability to recall them. Writing down dreams increases what is called dream recall, or the ability to remember dreams. When writing down dreams, the dreamer often searches for dream signs, or recurring themes that have been detected between dreams. Dream recall can vary from day to day, but keeping a diary tends to regulate waking dream memory.

It is important to record the dreams in the diary immediately after waking up, as individuals forget the details of their dreams very quickly. Writing the next day's date in the dream diary asserts a conscious thought to remember dreams, which communicates intention to the subconscious mind. The subconscious mind then responds (hopefully) by fulfilling that desire. This mental action causes the conscious and subconscious minds to work together toward the common goal of remembering the dream.

=== False awakenings ===
The discipline of waking up to record a dream in a diary sometimes leads to a false awakening where the dreamer records the previous dream while still in a dream. Some dream diarists report writing down the same dream one or two times in a dream before actually waking up, and recording it in a physical dream diary.

== Specific uses ==
Followers of Eckankar frequently keep dream diaries, since they view dreams as important teaching tools and as a gateway to "Soul Travel," or the shifting of one's consciousness to ever-higher states of being.

== See also ==
- Sleep diary
- False awakening
- List of dream diaries
- Stream of unconsciousness (narrative mode)
