= Elgaland-Vargaland =

Art project and micronation

KonungaRikerna Elgaland-Vargaland
- Micronation (unrecognized entity)
- Claimed by: Carl Michael von Hausswolff; Leif Elggren
- Dates claimed: May 27, 1992–present
- Website www.elgaland-vargaland.org

Elgaland-Vargaland is a conceptual art project and micronation conceived and developed by Swedish artists Carl Michael von Hausswolff and Leif Elggren in 1992. It is also known by its acronym "KREV" (KonungaRikena Elgaland-Vargaland).

== Origins ==
Von Hausswolff and Elggren formed the name out of their own names and define the country as being the borders of other countries. The decision to found the country and name themselves kings was in reaction to Sweden still having a monarchy. The country was announced in an advert in Dagens Nyheter newspaper. It was announced on May 27, 1992. Other Scandinavian artists have had micronations, such as Lars Vilks' Ladonia.

== Operations ==
"Elgaland-Vargaland is an extended series of objects and performances concerning territorial ownership, the right to rule and the rights of individuals."

— Gallery 400

Elgaland-Vargaland has a flag and national anthem, issues passports and stamps on request, and has had a number of "embassies" (art exhibitions). Elggren often invokes "the image of a street-corner lunatic with a paper crown who declares himself King".

In March 1994, they opened a "general consulate" at Thomas Nordanstad Gallery in New York and applied for membership of the United Nations. In 2002, on the tenth anniversary, a group of 10 travelled from Sweden to Estonia carrying only Elgaland-Vargaland passports - they were detained and their passports confiscated, and they were returned to Sweden the next day. They had planned to be turned away from each country in turn, indefinitely. The same year, they released a musical album titled "The kingdoms of Elgaland-Vargaland, 1992-2002", published by Ash International. In 2003, Elgaland-Vargaland attended a conference of micronations in Finland.

As of 2007, the country had around 850 citizens and by 2014 they claimed 980 citizens. In 2007 they had 20 ambassadors; the embassy in Reykjavik opened in 1994 at the Nýlistasafninu (Museum of Fine Arts) the embassy in Berlin was opened in 2006 at the Haus der Kulturen der Welt, and the Moroccan embassy opened in 2014 before the Marrakech Biennale. A "Consulate General" was held at Gallery 400 in Chicago for two months in 2007–8 as part of the city's Festival of Maps. They have a number of Ministers, mainly artists, including trumpeter Greg Kelley who is Minister of Fanfares.

The claims extend to other "interstitial territories" such as the transition from being asleep to wakefulness (the hypnogogic state), and limbo and they also regard all dead people as being citizens. In 2007, they declared at the Venice Biennale that they had annexed the Isola di San Michele, an island cemetery. This annexation project appeared at the Gallery Niklas Belenius in 2008.

== Reception ==
KREV has been described as Elggren's most well-known work. Swedish newspaper Expressen said that "their little kingdom more and more resembles a dictatorship" and noted what they perceived as flirtation by the artists with fascism.

Elgaland-Vargaland was also listed in Nick Middleton's book on Atlas of Countries That Don't Exist.
