= Alessandra Celletti =

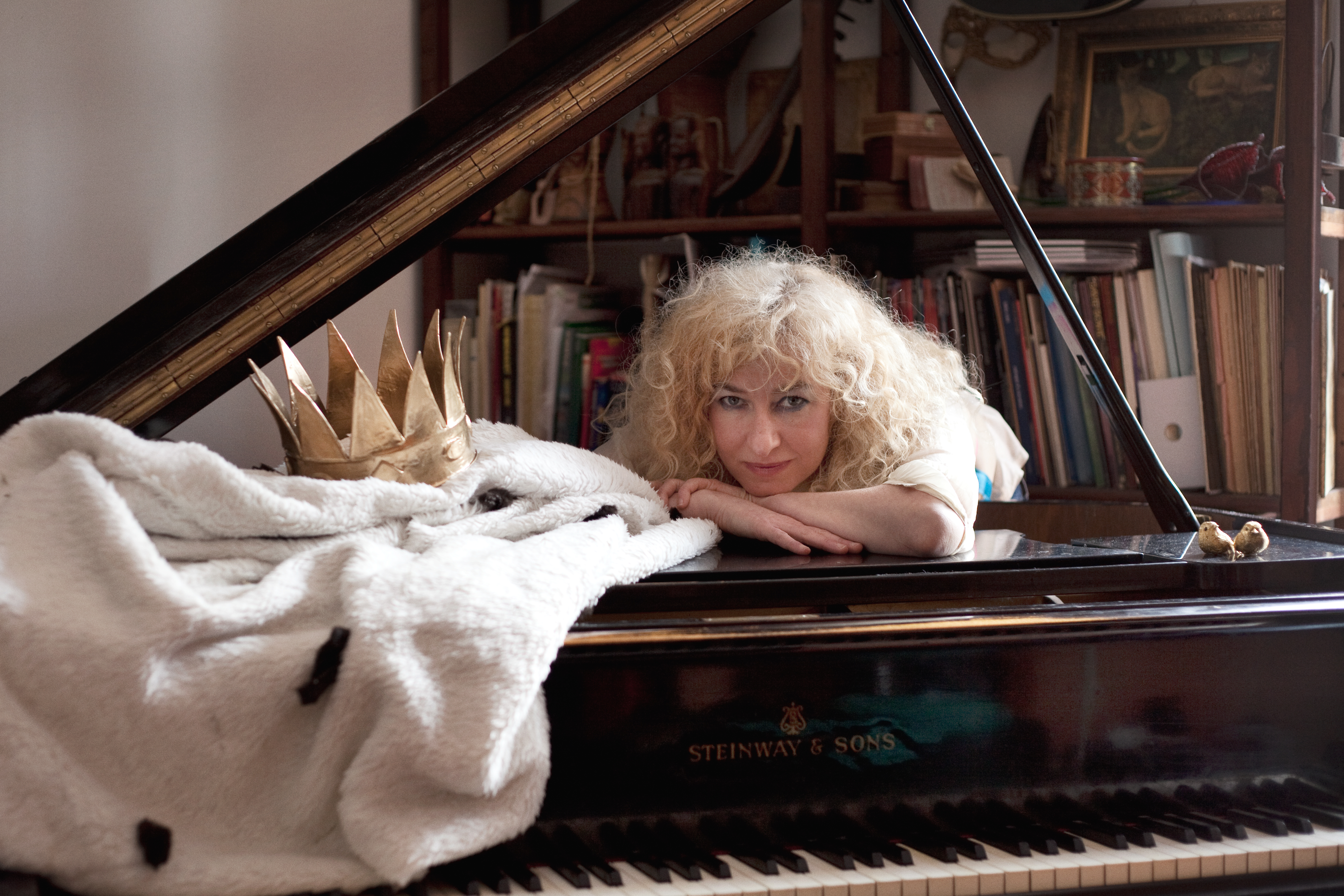
- Celletti in 2011

Background information
- Born: 6 June 1966 (age 60); Rome, Italy
- Genres: Classical, avantgarde
- Occupation: Musician
- Instruments: Piano, keyboards, vocals
- Years active: 1993–present
- Labels: LTM Records; Kha Records; Bleirot Records; Transparency Record
- Website: www.alessandracelletti.com

Alessandra Celletti (born 6 June 1966) is an Italian pianist, vocalist, songwriter and composer, best known as an interpreter of Erik Satie.

== Biography ==
Alessandra Celletti comes from a purely classical background, graduating at the Conservatory of Santa Cecilia in Rome and perfecting herself with Vera Gobbi Belcredi. She has played in Italy, France, England, Germany, Portugal, Denmark, Czech Republic, Austria, Spain, United States, Mozambique, Tunisia, India.

In 2006 she released the album "Chi mi darà le ali" (Who will give me wings); her repertoire as a performers includes, among others, compositions by Erik Satie, Claude Debussy, Maurice Ravel, Baldassarre Galuppi, Leoš Janáček, Gurdjieff / De Hartmann, Scott Joplin, John Cage and Philip Glass.

In 2007 she published "The Golden Fly" for the label Kha Records; in 2008 the album "Way Out" for the English label LTM Recordings in which the sounds of the piano blend with the rhythm of the drums and the voice.

Celletti has collaborated with the Swedish conceptual artist Paulina Wallenberg Olsson, the saxophonist Nicola Alesini, the percussionist Marcello Piccinini, the poet Beppe Costa, the multi-instrumentalist Luca Venitucci, the double bassist Daniele Ercoli, the violinist Her, the thereminist Maurizio Mansueti, the drummer Charles Hayward, the composer Lawrence Ball, the actor Flavio Bucci, the dancer Gloria Pomardi, the artist Giorgio Andreotta Calò, the artist Ray Caesar, the English composer Mark Tranmer (aka GNAC) with whom she published the album "The Red Pages" and the exponent of contemporary experimental electronic music, Hans Joachim Roedelius with whom, in 2009 for the North American label Transparency, she has composed and recorded the album "Sustanza di cose sperata".

The 2011 "Crazy Girl Blue", her thirteenth album, is published in parallel to a limited edition box set of 200 numbered copies of "Sketches of Sacagawea", a work dedicated to the Native American heroine Sacagawea.

With the German surrealist artist Jaan Patterson, in 2011 she composed the album-soundtrack that accompanies the release of the novel by George Bataille "W.C." for Transeuropa publisher.

In 2016 Alessandra Celletti released "Working on Satie", a project together with the figurative artist Onze. The work, thanks to a crowdfunding campaign, became a CD and DVD and the show was hosted for two dates, both sold out, at the Romaeuropa Festival 2016.

In 2020 Alessandra Celletti collaborates with the musician Alberto Tre and with the New York Times journalist Ian Urbina for the composition of Heroes part of "The Outlaw Ocean" project.

== The tour of "Piano piano on the road" ==
In the summer of 2013, Alessandra Celletti took her piano around Italy on board a truck with the project "piano piano on the road". The entire itinerary has become a documentary directed by Marco Carlucci produced by PrimaFilm, selected in competition at the Edmonton International Film Festival in Canada and at the Zagreb Dox Festival in Croatia. The trailer won the "Roma Videoclip Award – Cinema meets Music" XXI edition, while the documentary won the "DOC Travel" competition of the eleventh edition of the Florence Travel Festival. The French director Patrice Leconte supported this project by declaring: "I know well the compositions of Alessandra Celletti, this beautiful pianist who, when she sits at the piano she shines with a light that makes her even more beautiful." She told me about her project, a bit crazy, but exciting and original: to take the music far and wide and seduce people along the miles, and I imagine her, sitting at her piano, aboard a large truck, shrouded by the light of the sunset, while the stars up there start to draw the blue sea sky, she lets herself go to the sweetest melodies, like a dreamed image of a film by Fellini".

== Music and civil commitment ==
=== The protest against nuclear experiments ===
In 1996, following repeated nuclear experiments on Mururoa, Alessandra Celletti composed and published "Overground" a CD that represents a protest against the tests authorized by Chirac on the Pacific atoll. In the back cover of the cd the pianist declares: "What seemed absurd to me, apart from the absurdity of the atomic bomb itself, apart from Hiroshima and Nagasaki, apart from Chernobyl, aside from all that we are not allowed to know, was considering an island of the Pacific, thousands of kilometers away, a private property that can be safely abused".

=== In support of the Teatro Valle occupied ===
27 September 2011 Alessandra Celletti performed, in duo with the tereminist Maurizio ErMan Mansueti, in support of the Teatro Valle occupied. Artists from all over the world have come to elaborate proposals on new public theater management systems, rethinking different models of cultural policies in Italy from below.

=== Against the choice to halve the Regional funds for art and culture ===
Sunday, 4 March 2012, Alessandra Celletti joins with a "Half Concert" in Rieti, the Festival of half Museums. "I firmly adhere to a political protest finally made with poetry and creativity: the initiative of the Half Museums. It is a surreal and strong way to fight to draw attention to the painful consequences caused by the short-sighted choice of halving the funds allocated to the Museums, the Historical Archives and the Libraries of the Lazio Region. So I will sit down at the piano and introduce you to my latest work, "Crazy Girl Blue", playing only half of my compositions. The notes will begin to flow, then, without warning and without giving the time to understand, I will interrupt the sound and it could happen right on the most beautiful, particularly effective harmonic lap, by half tearing the melody. I will do it with infinite displeasure because I like to play a music from beginning to end, without abrupt interruptions, without unfair cuts ... But I will have to interrupt the tracks to be in solidarity with this brilliant protest of museums against the reduction of 50% of Regional funds, and to make it clear how cruel it is to halve art, whether it is poetry, color or music ...

=== Alessandra Celletti e TBContinued ===
On 24 March 2013, Alessandra Celletti took part in "To Be Continued ..." an initiative aimed at the union of people through music. The primary reason for the event is the fight against tuberculosis in all the nations of the world. Through the internet the participating musicians transmitted from their country of origin, performing a live performance lasting twenty minutes and, once the performance was finished, they passed the ideal witness to a fellow musician in another part of the Globe. Among others the musicians who have joined: Pauline Oliveros, Eyvind Kang, Yan Jun, Andrew Kireyev ... Many related nations: New Zealand, Russia, China, Australia, South Africa, Canada, Lebanon, Brazil, USA, Turkey, Venezuela, Italy ... Exactly 39 countries, their musicians have expressed a hope for a better humanity and a ready medical research, together with their respective governments, to help the populations of the whole Earth.

=== Occupied Place ===
In the summer of 2013 Alessandra Celletti joined the initiative of Maria Andaloro Occupied Place the campaign launched to keep alive the focus on violence against women. In every stage of the "Piano piano on the road" tour, an empty chair represented the victims of femicides.

=== Without life imprisonment. For a less vindictive society ===
In the "Due Palazzi" Prison in Padua, Friday 6 June 2014 Alessandra Celletti took part in the conference entitled "Without life imprisonment. For a less vindictive society "playing for the convicts. It was a day of study in order to open a debate, whose basic idea is that a milder justice and a more humane criminal system can make society more civilized. Among the speakers: Agnese Moro daughter of Aldo Moro, Massimo Pavarini, professor of criminal law, Andrea Pugiotto, professor of constitutional law, Ornella Favero, journalist of Ristretti Orizzonti, Carmelo Musumeci, lifer and writer.

=== In defense of animal rights ===
In 2015 Alessandra Celletti lent her image to the campaign promoted by LAV, Animal Equality and Thegreenplace in defense of animal rights, for an Easter without the usual slaughter of lambs. Slogan of the photographic campaign: "At Easter, make a sacrifice. Do not kill me". Among the other artists who have joined: Nora Lux, Daniela Poggi, Giovanni Baglioni, Christian Stelluti, Loredana Cannata.

In collaboration with the artist Paola Luciani in 202O comes out Love Animals, a box set with CD and DVD. Six love songs dedicated to six particularly important animals in Alessandra Celletti's life

=== Music to plant Trees ===
In 2017 Alessandra Celletti was the only Italian musician to participate in the project of the Aural Films record label "This music plants trees", a compilation of 25 musicians from different parts of the world, with the aim of encouraging the care of trees starting from the simple act of planting them. All the proceeds from the "Music Plants Trees" album, have been donated to the "Plant a Billion Trees" project. Among the artists who took part in the project: Amanda Chaudhary (USA), Annemarie Borg-Antara (United Kingdom), Bark Citrus Oakestra (USA), Candy L (USA), Cheryl Leonard (USA), Chuck Van Zyl (USA), Dawn Tuesday (USA), Djam Karet (USA), Fernwood (USA), Forrest Fang (USA), Gypsy Witch (United Kingdom), Jack Hertz (USA), John Wiggins (USA), Lomita (Germany), Meng Qi (China), metlay! (USA), Mika Pontecorvo (USA), PBK (USA), Robert Scott Thompson (USA), Salim Nair (India), Shane Morris (USA), Theothersideofwho (Germany), Thollem Electric (Earth), Tony Gerber (USA).

== Discography ==
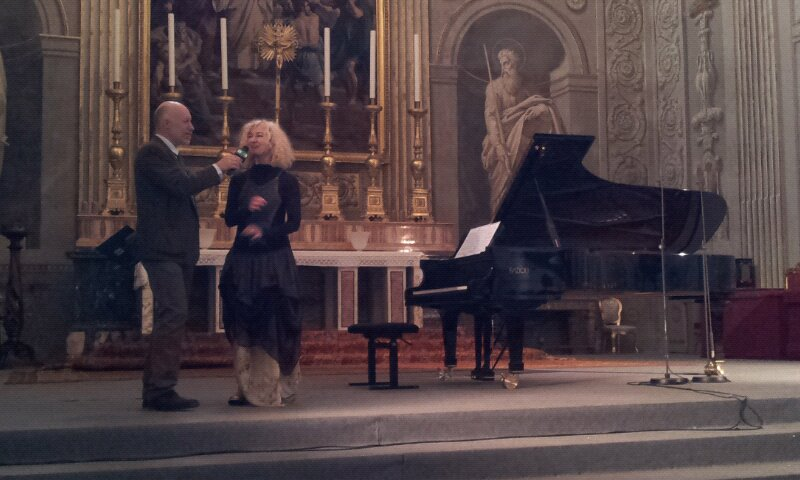
Alessandra Celletti durante il suo concerto al Quirinale, marzo 2012

- 1994 – Debussy, Ravel, Satie Les sons et les parfums
- 1996 – Autori boemi Viaggio a Praga
- 1997 – Overground
- 1998 – Gurdjieff-de Hartmann Hidden Sources
- 2000 – Erik Satie Esoterik Satie
- 2002 – Scott Joplin Black Baby
- 2005 – Philip Glass Metamorphosis
- 2006 – Chi mi darà le ali
- 2007 – The Golden Fly
- 2008 – Way Out
- 2009 – Alessandra Celletti Plays Baldassarre Galuppi
- 2009 – Sustanza di Cose Sperata (con Hans-Joachim Roedelius)
- 2010 – The Red Pages (con Mark Tranmer)
- 2010 – Sketches of Sacagawea
- 2011 – W.C. (con Jaan Patterson)
- 2011 – Crazy Girl Blue
- 2013 – Above the Sky
- 2014 – Il Viandante nel Cuore dello Zodiaco
- 2016 – Working on Satie
- 2018 – Sacred Honey
- 2019 – Cellettiblue
- 2020 – Love Animals
- 2021 – Heroes
- 2021 – Experience

== DVD ==
- 2009 – Paraphernalia
- 2014 – Piano piano on the road
- 2016 – Working on Satie
- 2020 – Love Animals

== Soundtracks ==
- Indestructible directed by Michele Citoni
- My mother's fairytales directed by Paola Romagnani
- Elan Vital directed by Jason Loya
- Why a film about Michele de Lucchi directed by Alessio Bozzer
- Mio Duce I write to you a documentary produced by the Istituto Luce directed by Massimo Martella and broadcast by Rai 3
- In the name of Antea a documentary produced by the Istituto Luce directed by Massimo Martella.
- The interpretation of Alessandra Celletti of the Gnossienne n. 1 by Erik Satie was used in the soundtrack of the film Revolver (2005) directed by Guy Ritchie.

== Books ==
- Paraphernalia written by the musical journalist Massimo Marchini in the form of an interview with pianist Alessandra Celletti; the book contains unpublished photographic material. Paraphernalia was translated and published in English by the American label Transparency including a DVD with a selection of videos made by twelve Italian directors and videomakers.
