= John Duncan (American artist) =

American performance and sound artist

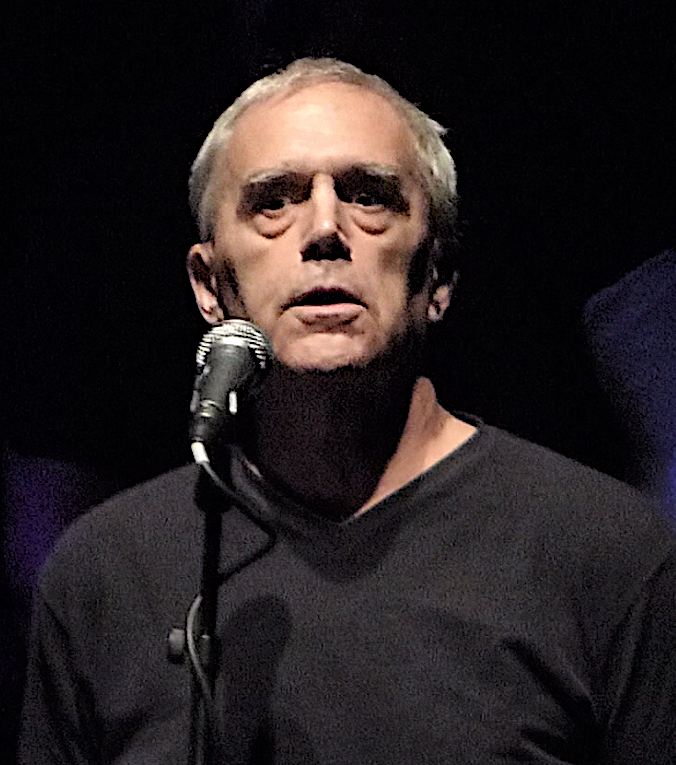
- Duncan in 2018
- Born: John Duncan; June 17, 1953 (age 73); Wichita, Kansas, U.S.
- Education: California Institute of the Arts, Los Angeles
- Known for: Performance art, video art, installations, experimental music
- Notable work: Scare, Blind Date, The Crackling, The Keening Towers, The Error, The Gauntlet
- Website: www.johnduncan.org

John Duncan is an American artist whose body of work includes performance art, installations, contemporary music, video art and experimental film, often involving the extensive use of recorded sound. His music is composed mainly of recordings from shortwave radio, field recordings and voice. His events and installations are often confrontational in nature. Duncan currently lives in and operates out of Bologna, Italy.

== Early years ==
Duncan was born in Wichita, Kansas, to parents of English and Scottish ancestry. He was raised with a strict Calvinist upbringing where self-reliance, hard work, and the suppression of emotional suffering were considered virtues. Questioning authority was severely punished. In his teens he studied figure drawing and painting together with psychology and the physics of light. His first contact with experimental music was the Jacques Lasry LP Chronophagie, discovered in the record bins of the Wichita Public Library. In 1971 he applied for and received Conscientious Objector status. At 19 he left for Los Angeles to attend CalArts, where he studied under Allan Kaprow.

== Los Angeles ==
In the mid-1970s, his Los Angeles performances, events and installations were influenced by the 'Poor Theatre' of Jerzy Grotowski, as well as the cathartic exposure of personal experiences seen in the work of Viennese actionist artist Rudolf Schwarzkogler and early feminist performance art. Several of his early events were held in private or in front of a small number of witnesses. Scare was an encouragement to examine the physical effects of fear. Duncan donned a disguise and fired a blank-loaded pistol at point-blank range at two carefully selected participants, Tom Recchion and Paul McCarthy, chosen “...because they were close friends who would not expect anything like this to happen to them and who would be able to appreciate the event as I intended it”. Bus Ride sexually stimulated unsuspecting passengers on a city bus with a liquid poured into the ventilation system in order to observe the results. Blind Date, involving intercourse with a female corpse followed by a vasectomy, both conducted in private, was presented as an audio-only event to an audience in a darkened warehouse, a demonstration of how men are conditioned to turn emotional suffering into rage. An untitled character-exchange event with McCarthy was held in private in McCarthy's studio, where Duncan recorded actions to video that McCarthy immediately erased.

Other events were presented to radio audiences. No was Duncan's first public performance of a Reichian exercise (later known as bioenergetic analysis) broadcast live over Close Radio. Happy Homes, his last performance before leaving Los Angeles, was a telephone exchange with radio therapist Dr. Toni Grant, broadcast live over the ABC radio network. Duncan described several child-abuse cases he had personally witnessed as a Los Angeles city bus driver as he asked the therapist for advice.

His first films were shot in Super-8, silent or with separate audio, intended either as stand-alone works or as elements used in live events. The performance For Women Only is centered around a film intended to erotically arouse the all-woman audience, who were then invited to enter a back room and abuse Duncan sexually. The Secret Film was screened individually to eight viewers before the film itself and the room where it was shown were both destroyed by fire.

Together with McCarthy he co-produced Close Radio, a weekly series of live radio broadcasts over KPFK that provided airtime to artists working in sound, many of them for the first time. The Close Radio archive was donated to the Getty Center in 2007.

In 1978 he became closely associated with the Los Angeles Free Music Society (LAFMS), working on collaborations with Tom Recchion, Fredrik Nilsen and Joe Potts. His earliest recorded audio experiments were also made at this time, including work with Michael LeDonne-Bhennet, McCarthy, Recchion and Nilsen. His first solo LP Organic was released in 1979. His first solo recordings with shortwave radio were released in 1982 on the EP Creed which also included the complete broadcast of Happy Homes.

== Tokyo ==
Duncan left the United States for Tokyo in 1982, where he continued his performance work, and expanded his experiments with recorded shortwave broadcasts and film. The music he produced in this period, including Kokka (National Anthem) with Cosey Fanni Tutti and Chris Carter, the solo LP Riot and Dark Market Broadcast, led to collaborations with a number of Japanese noise music artists, including Masami Akita, Keiji Haino and Hijokaidan. His solo recordings and live concerts from this period establish him as one of the early pioneers of Japanese noise; the first non-Japanese to work in the genre in Japan.

It was also here that he began to deliberately limit the exhibition of his visual art to public arenas, outside of established art galleries and institutions. His performances centered on Reichian breath exercises conducted onstage and in public, including Cast performed on the floor of the women's public toilet at the 'Second Annual Alternative Media Conference' in Tokyo in 1986. The collage series that he produced for display in strategically selected public men's toilets called The Toilet Exhibition combined graphic war-damage images from world events with commercial pornography to emphasize links between them, in private stalls frequented by men from government offices (Kokkai-gijidomae), the banking sector (Hibia) and the fashion industry (Shibuya).

In the mid-1980s he began pirate radio and television broadcasts with portable custom-made transmitters built by Duncan himself, operating illegally from apartment block roofs in central Tokyo and an abandoned US Army hospital near Sagamihara, as well as periodic broadcasts made from his own home. Radio Code broadcasts featured the early live work of musician Keiji Haino and Butoh soloist Hisako Horikawa, which were also relayed throughout Tokyo via other pirate radio stations, particularly Radio Homerun in Shimokitazawa. TVC-1 television broadcasts were transmitted from central Tokyo rooftops, over the frequency assigned to NHK 1 after the station had concluded its broadcast day, limited to 12 minutes in order to avoid contact with Tokyo police.

His work in film and video included the Super-8 films Trigger with a solo soundtrack, Brutal Birthday with a live soundtrack performed by Duncan's group C.V. Massage, and a support film for the performance event Move Forward that included images from hardcore pornography and animated technical drawings of nuclear attack strategies.

He also directed a series of commercial adult videos for Kuki Inc. under the name John See, for which he also wrote the scripts, edited, composed soundtracks and occasionally acted in incidental roles. Several re-edited versions of John See videos were broadcast over TVC-1, also appearing in the 2003 video installation See.

== Amsterdam ==
In 1988 Duncan moved to Amsterdam. The Kick performance series of Reichian exercises was conducted before live audiences throughout Europe, from 1989 at Ars Electronica in Linz, Austria, to 1993. The final event was held on the altar of the Parochiale Kirche in Berlin, concluding a live solo concert.

His audio installation Stress Chamber consists of three independent motors vibrating the walls of a shipping container at its resonant frequency, remote-controlled from outside. Participants enter one at a time, nude, to be locked inside, allowing the vibrations to move at random around and through the participant's body. Stress Chamber was premiered in Amsterdam at the Absolute Threshold Machine Festival. Initially the festival organizers threatened to cancel the work due to its tendency to vibrate the grounds of the surrounding area to a 90-meter radius, concerned that it would become a 'torture device'. Finally the work was allowed, and the queue it created kept the entire festival open several hours longer than anticipated.

In 1988 and 1989 several of his films were broadcast over Rabotnik TV along with Anthem, a Reichian exercise performed for the Rabotnik TV camera in a derelict building used by heroin addicts. Location sound for Anthem was recorded by Andrew M. McKenzie. Between 1990 and 1993, Radio Code FM broadcasts continued as weekly programs which he produced and hosted over pirate stations Radio 100 and Radio Patapoe.

The Maze event in June 1995 involved a group of seven volunteer participants, including Duncan and an infant child, locked naked and blind overnight in an Amsterdam cellar in order to directly experience workings of the mind in a situation of unexpected sensory deprivation. The event ended when several participants pried open the exit door with their fingernails and broke it down. The infant child slept through the entire event. A video created from infrared photos taken during the event was produced later that year at Contained in Linz, Austria.

Music from this period includes CD releases Contact with Andrew M. McKenzie, Send with tracks by McKenzie and Zbigniew Karkowski and The Crackling, composed with Max P. Springer in 1996 from field recordings made by Duncan at the Stanford Linear Accelerator Center. A 1997 review by Rob Young claimed The Crackling rendered the Stanford research facility '...perhaps the largest musical instrument ever created'.

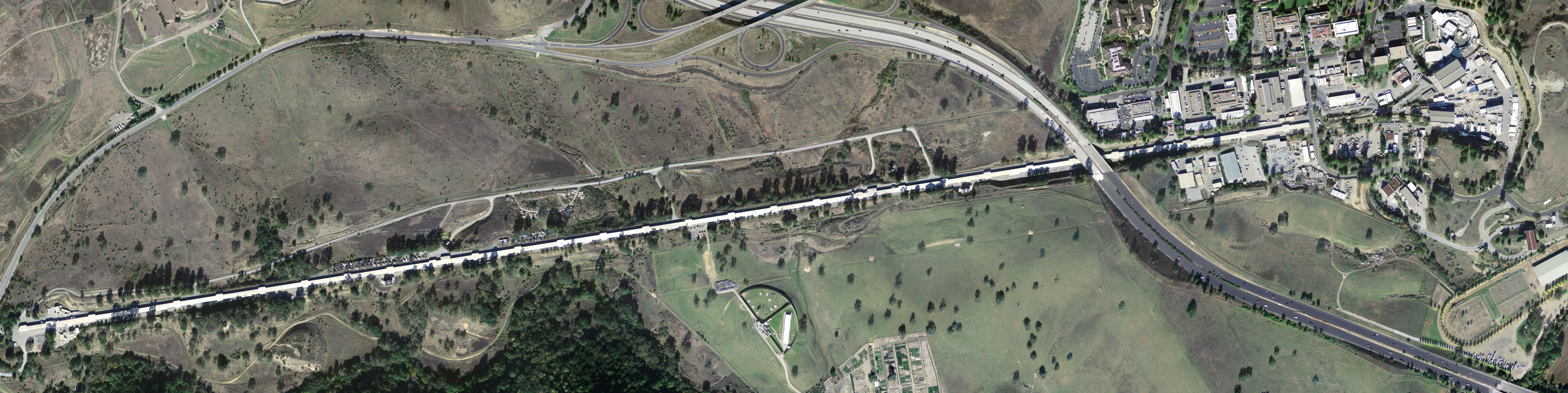
Aerial photo of the Stanford Linear Accelerator

== Scrutto di San Leonardo ==
In 1996 he met Giuliana Stefani when she posed as a model for Duncan's photo project Icons. Her academic training in mathematics, work in photography and practice of meditation quickly catalyzed a bond between them. In autumn 1996 they left Amsterdam and set up a studio in Scrutto di San Leonardo, a village of fewer than 100 inhabitants in the Friuli-Venezia-Giulia province of Italy at the border with Slovenia. They were married in Scrutto di San Leonardo in 1998. Their collaborations include Charge Field and Palace of Mind. They agreed to separate amicably in 2005.

The Keening Towers at the Gothenburg Art Museum, 2003. Photo by Giuliana Stefani

Art works from this period include the outdoor audio installation The Keening Towers (2003) for the 2nd Gothenburg Biennial composed with children's voices, played continuously for 90 days over speakers suspended 25 meters above the entrance to the Gothenburg Art Museum, as well as the performance event Voice Contact (1998–2000) where volunteer participants enter alone, nude and blind into an empty room as Duncan, also nude and blind, responds uniquely to each according to their movements within the space. The first Voice Contact event was held in a modified suite at the five-star Lydmar Hotel in Stockholm in 1998.

Video from this period includes The North Is Protected, based on the text with the same title written by Leif Elggren.

Duncan's work with radio continued and expanded. Cross Radio broadcasts were three-hour live experimental music programs produced and hosted by Duncan, aired weekly from 23:00 to 02:00 over Radio Onde Furlane in Udine, syndicated over Resonance FM in London, Radio Autonoma in Madrid, Radio Kinesonus in Tokyo and WPS1 in New York. Over Radio Onde Furlane, each show continued until 05:30.

Audio releases from this period include Crucible, Tap Internal, Palace of Mind (cited above), Nav with Francisco López, Fresh with zeitkratzer, Phantom Broadcast, Infrasound Tidal from sources by Densil Cabrera, Tongue with Elliott Sharp, Presence with Edvard Graham Lewis and Da Sich Die Machtgier... with sources by Asmus Tietchens.

== Bologna ==
Duncan relocated to Bologna in 2005, setting up a studio near Porta San Vitale.

His first project here was the production of The Error, a 50-page hardbound book measuring 40 x 60 cm of his writings and photographs, printed by letterpress in an edition of 10 copies. The Error was first included together with a DVD video version of the work in Dialogue 1 at Gallery Enrico Fornello in Prato, Italy, curated in 2006 by Simone Menegoi. Copies of The Error are in the collections of Niklas Belenius, Leif Elggren, Piergiorgio Fornello, Paul McCarthy, Giuliana Stefani and François Kaeser, who sponsored the production.

In 2006 he recorded Our Telluric Conversation with Carl Michael von Hausswolff and Nine Suggestions with Pan Sonic members Mika Vainio and Ilpo Väisänen. The audio installation The Garden with Valerio Tricoli was included in the 2006 edition of Eco e Narciso held at the IPCA Ecomuseum in the province of Turin, a deserted factory complex once infamous for production methods that directly caused the deaths of several thousand workers as well as hundreds of residents of the surrounding area. A DVD video The Garden based on the installation and shot at the IPCA site was produced in 2007.

In January 2007 Duncan performed Something Like Seeing in the Dark with Elggren, premiered at Palazzo Re Enzo, Bologna for the Netmage 07 festival. In August, his solo audio installation The Tolling was introduced at Smepp: Società Mezzi Portuali at the Piombino dockyards for Piombino eXperimenta 3. In September, Duncan curated Cross Lake Atlantic with large-scale works by Scott Arford, Gary Jo Gardenhire, Kim Gordon and Jutta Koether, Brandon LaBelle, Teresa Margolles and Fredrik Nilsen at Gallery Enrico Fornello in Prato. In October, three pieces from The Plasma Missives, with texts written in Duncan's blood, and three pieces from his Distractions series, with his blood used as paint, were exhibited together with work by Elggren at Gallery Niklas Belenius in Stockholm.

In 2008, he began teaching Audio Art at l'Accademia di Belle Arti di Bologna.

== Later work ==
In February 2008 Duncan's audio installation The Gauntlet was held at Färgfabriken in Stockholm: a series of anti-theft alarms with infrared sensors, turned on at ten-minute intervals and triggered at random by visitors moving blindly through the darkened hall.

In June 2008 Ensemble Phoenix performed interpretations with acoustic instruments of Phantom Broadcast, scored and conducted by Duncan, in live concerts held at Gare du Nord in Basel and Dampfzentrale in Bern. The Dampfzentrale concert was recorded for broadcast in Switzerland over DRS2.

In May 2009 Ensemble Phoenix performed a modified interpretation of Phantom Broadcast in a live concert again conducted by Duncan, held at Teatro San Leonardo in Bologna for the Angelica 2009 Festival. In June, Duncan and Pasut performed an early version of their dance duet An Open Area Inside the Mountain at Teatro Dimora in Mondaino, Italy. 24 hours later, he and C.M. von Hausswolff performed Nocturnal Denizens in a concert for the Cut & Splice festival sponsored by the BBC held at Wilton's Music Hall, London.

== Bibliography ==
Monograph:

- John Duncan: Work 1975-2005 (Errant Bodies Press, 2006 ISBN 978-0-9772594-2-7) with contributions by Daniela Cascella, Leif Elggren, Cosey Fanni Tutti, Mike Kelley, Brandon LaBelle, Paul McCarthy, Tom Recchion, Takuya Sakaguchi, Giuliana Stefani and Carl Michael von Hausswolff.

Critical and scholarly studies:

- Thomas Bey William Bailey, Vox Stimuli included in "Micro-bionic", Creation Books 2008 p. 143-159
- Kristine Stiles, Uncorrupted Joy included in "Out of Actions: between performance and the object 1948-1979" (1998) p. 240-241
- Daniela Cascella, John Duncan: From noise, installations, shortwave radio, field recordings, one of the masters of experimentation of the last 20 years, "Blow Up" November 2000
- Jim Haynes, Shock Treatment, "The Wire" May 2001
- See also: interviews and comments

== Discography ==
2016

- Bitter Earth LP released in limited edition by IDEAL

2011

- There Must Be A Way Across This River / The Abject LP w/ Michael Esposito and Z'EV released by Fragment Factory, DE

2009

- John Duncan Live - Brussels CDr released in limited edition by Allquestions, IT
- The Nazca Transmissions LP released by Alga Marghen, IT

2007

- Untitled CD released by Die Stadt, DE

2006

- Our Telluric Conversation CD w/C.M. von Hausswolff released by 23Five, US
- The Garden CD w/V. Tricoli released by Eco e Narciso, IT
- John Duncan: Work 1975-2005 Monograph w/CD published by Errant Bodies Press, DK
- John Duncan: First Recordings 1978-1985 3xLP and DVD released by Vinyl On Demand, DE
- The Keening Towers (excerpt) 2xCD released by Institute of Contemporary Art, US

2005

- Conservatory CD w/P. Parisi released by Allquestions, IT
- Nine Suggestions CD w/M. Vainio and I. Vaisanen released by Allquestions, IT

2004

- Presence CD w/E.G. Lewis released by Allquestions, IT
- Tongue CD w/Elliott Sharp released by Allquestions, IT

2003

- Phantom Broadcast CD released by Allquestions, IT
- Infrasound-Tidal CD released by Allquestions, IT
- The Keening Towers CD released by Allquestions, IT
- Stun Shelter CD released by Galleria Nicola Fornello, IT
- The Gossamer Dispatch EP released by Die Stadt, DE
- Da Sich Die Machtgier... CD released by Die Stadt, DE
- The Scattering CD w/Peter Fleur released by edition ..., US

2002

- Fresh CD w/zeitkratzer released by Allquestions, IT

2001

- Palace of Mind CD w/G. Stefani released by Allquestions, IT
- Nav 2xCD w/Francisco López released by Allquestions, IT

2000

- Tap Internal CD released by Touch, UK

1998

- Seek CD released by Staalplaat, NL
- The Elgaland/Vargaland National Anthem EP w/Z. Karkowsky released by Die Stadt, DE
- Crucible CD released by Die Stadt, DE

1997

- Split Second track on 5xCD Tulpas released by Selektion, DE
- The John See Soundtracks CD released by RRRecords, US

1996

- The Crackling CD released by trente oiseaux, DE
- Home: Unspeakable CD w/ B. Guenter released by trente oiseaux, DE
- Change track on CD The Mind of a Missile released by Heel Stone, DE
- Charge Field track w/G. Stefani on 2xCD Antiphony released by Touch, UK
- Hymn track on 3xCD State of the Union released by Atavistic, US
- Trinity track on 2xCD A Fault In the Nothing released by Touch, UK
- The Ruud E. Memorial Choir / Psychonaut EP released by Robot Records, US

1995

- Incoming CD released by Streamline, DE

1994

- The John See Soundtracks LP released by RRRecords, US
- Send CD released by Touch, UK
- River In Flames / Klaar 2xCD released by Staalplaat, NL

1993

- Chapel Perilous and Kick tracks on Anckarström Live CD released by Staalplaat, NL

1991

- KLAAR CD by Extreme, Australia

1990

- Dark Market Broadcast CD released by Staalplaat, NL
- Mirror Pulse Cassette released by Extreme, Australia
- Riot / Brutal Birthday Soundtrack CD released by Dark Vinyl, DE
- Contact CD w/A.M. McKenzie released by Touch, UK

1988-89

- Radio Code Cassette released by AQM, NL

1986

- Phantom Track on Video=Aleph Video Cassette released by Kakuseikobo Arts & Music, JP

1985

- Dark Market Broadcast Cassette released by Cause & Effect, US
- Purge track on 4x cassette Journey Into Pain released by Beast 666, JP
- Riposte Track on Morality cassette released by Broken Flag, UK
- Probe Track on Assemblée Generale 4 cassette released by PPP, Paris

1984

- Riot LP released by AQM, Tokyo
- Pleasure-Escape Cassette/book released by B-Sellers, Tokyo

1983

- Kokka EP released by AQM, Tokyo

1980

- Creed EP released by AQM, Los Angeles

1979

- Organic LP released by AQM, Los Angeles

1978

- No Cassette released by AQM, Los Angeles
- Station Event Cassette w/M. della Donne-Bhennet and T. Recchion released by AQM, Los Angeles
- Two Solos Cassette released by AQM, Los Angeles
