= Fragment Factory =

Independent German experimental electronic music label

- Founded: 2009
- Founder: Michael Muennich
- Genre: Sound art Electro-acoustic; Noise; Musique concrète Experimental
- Country of origin: Germany
- Location: Hamburg
- Official website: http://www.fragmentfactory.com/

Fragment Factory is an independent record label and mail-order house based in Hamburg, Germany, founded in 2009 by Michael Muennich (born 1980). The label specializes in releasing experimental electronic music in the broadest sense, including electroacoustic music, sound art, noise music and its several sub-categories. The output of Fragment Factory has been published on different formats, such as cassette tape, vinyl, CD / CD-R and consists of works by international sound artists from the US, Canada, Asia, UK and Europe.

== Selected discography ==
- [FRAG06] Bryan Lewis Saunders & Raymond Dijkstra – Le Bobcat C40 cassette (2010)
- [FRAG07] Dried Up Corpse – Nothing from Nothing C20 cassette (2010)
- [FRAG09] Yoshihiro Kikuchi – Texts Absence / Optical Gloom / Audible Lights C40 cassette (2010)
- [FRAG10] Circuit Wound – They Thrive in Complacency C20 cassette (2010)
- [FRAG16] Michael Esposito & Kevin Drumm – "The Icy Echoer" 7" (2010)
- [FRAG19] GX Jupitter-Larsen & Muennich – "Die Arbeiter von Wien" 7" (2011)
- [FRAG20] John Duncan / Michael Esposito / Z'EV – There Must Be a Way Across This River/The Abject LP (2011)
- [FRAG23] Joachim Montessuis – Chapel Perilous LP (2012)
- [FRAG26] Aaron Dilloway & Tom Smith – Allein zu Zweit C48 cassette (2013)
- [FRAG29] Schimpfluch-Gruppe – Nigredo C46 cassette (2013)
- [FRAG32] Enema Syringe – "Upshutlenvolte" 7" (2014)
- [FRAG36] Leif Elggren – Das Baank LP (2016)
- [FRAG39] Alice Kemp – Fill My Body with Flowers and Rice LP (2016)
- [FRAG41] Eryck Abecassis & Francisco Meirino – La Gueule du loup CD (2017)
- [FRAG45] Antoine Chessex – Subjectivation LP (2018)
- [FRAG46] Christina Kubisch – Schall und Klang CD (2019)
