= Stand-up tragedy =

Style of tragic performance

Stand-up tragedy is a style of tragic performance where a performer performs in front of a live audience, speaking directly to them. The goal of stand-up tragedy is to make the audience members cry.

== Format ==
Stand-up tragedy performances are usually long and employ the use of various media such as video, audio, highly emotional monologues and rants where the performer recites a fast-paced succession of tragic and disturbing stories. Stand-up tragedy is often performed in bars, nightclubs, private homes, art museums, galleries and universities.

== History ==
The comedian Brother Theodore (1906–2001) used the term to describe his comedic act which was dark, and had an absurdist edge. The Beat poet Lawrence Ferlinghetti (1919–2021) often referred to himself as a "stand-up tragedian", and performance artist Bryan Lewis Saunders uses it to describe his own act in a more literal sense of the term.
