= Ronnie Yeskel =

American casting director (1948 or 1949 – 2025)

- Born: 1948 or 1949; New Jersey, U.S.
- Died: January 4, 2025 (aged 76); Los Angeles, California, U.S.
- Occupation: Casting director
- Notable work: Reservoir Dogs; Pulp Fiction; Curb Your Enthusiasm

Ronnie Yeskel (1948 or 1949 – January 4, 2025) was an American casting director. She worked on the films Reservoir Dogs (1992), Pulp Fiction (1994), Things to Do in Denver When You're Dead (1995), The Long Kiss Goodnight (1996), Bean (1997), Waking the Dead (2000), Igby Goes Down (2002), Orphan (2009), and The Sessions (2012), and the television series L.A. Law (1990–1993) and Curb Your Enthusiasm (2000–2002).

Yeskel was nominated with Marla Garlin and Richard Hicks for a 2003 Primetime Emmy Award for Outstanding Casting for a Comedy Series for Curb Your Enthusiasm.

== Personal life and death ==
Yeskel was born and raised in New Jersey. She died at the Motion Picture & Television Fund Retirement Home in Woodland Hills, Los Angeles, on January 4, 2025, at the age of 76.
