= Carl Michael von Hausswolff =

Swedish music composer and visual artist (born 1956)

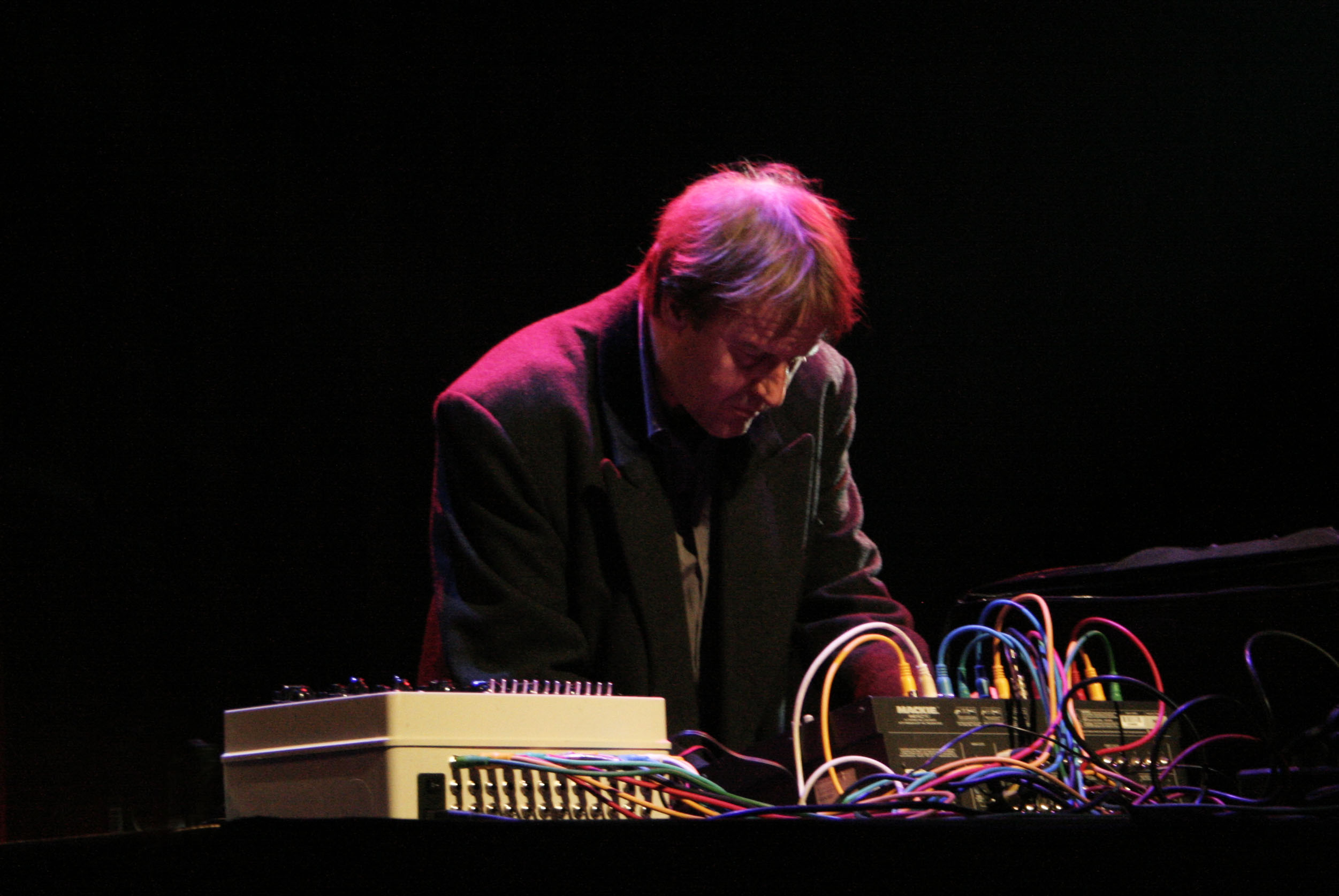
- von Hausswolff in 2008
- Born: 1956 (age 69–70); Linköping, Sweden
- Website: cmvonhausswolff.net

Carl Michael von Hausswolff (born 1956) is a composer, visual artist, and curator based in Stockholm, Sweden. His main tools are recording devices (camera, tape deck, radar, sonar) used in an ongoing investigation of electricity, frequency, architectural space, and paranormal electronic interference. Major exhibitions include Manifesta (1996), documenta X (1997), the Johannesburg Biennial (1997), Sound Art – Sound as Media at ICC in Tokyo (2000), the Venice Biennale (2001, 2003, and 2005), and Portikus, Frankfurt (2004). Von Hausswolff received a Prix Ars Electronica award for Digital Music in 2002.

Von Hausswolff was born in Linköping. He is an expert in the work of Friedrich Jürgenson, an electronic voice phenomenon (EVP) researcher who claimed to have detected voices of the dead hidden in radio static. Von Hausswolff's own sound works are pure, intuitive studies of electricity, frequency, and tone. Collaborators include Erik Pauser, with whom he worked as Phauss (1981–1993), Leif Elggren, and John Duncan. He also collaborates with EVP researcher Michael Esposito, filmmaker Thomas Nordanstad, and with Graham Lewis (Wire) and Jean-Louis Huhta in the band OSCID.

Von Hausswolff is noted for creating sound works that "charge the air with subliminal force" using "drones, radio signals, and sonic frequencies".

Von Hausswolff is co-monarch (with Elggren) of the conceptual art project The Kingdoms of Elgaland-Vargaland (KREV): all areas of no-man's land, territories between national boundaries on both land and sea, and digital and mental spaces. This nation has its own national anthem, flag, coat of arms, currency, citizens, and ministers.

Recent audio works include "800 000 Seconds in Harar" (Touch), "Matter Transfer" (iDeal), "The Wonderful World of Male Intuition" (Oral), "There Are No Crows Flying Around the Hancock Building" (Lampo), "Rats", "Maggots", and "Bugs" (all three on Laton), "Three Overpopulated Cities ..." (Sub Rosa), "A Lecture on Disturbances in Architecture" (Firework Editions), and "Ström" and "Leech" (both on Raster-Noton).

Other visual works include "Red Pool" (Cities on the Move, Bangkok, 1999), "Red Night" (SITE Santa Fe, 1999), "Red Code" (CCA Kitakyushu, 2001), "Red Empty" (Lampo/WhiteWalls, Chicago, 2003), and "Red Mersey" (Liverpool Biennial, 2004).

He is also the curator and producer of the sound-installation "freq out", shown at Moderna Museet (Stockholm), Henie-Onstad Center (Oslo), Sonambiente (Berlin), and other places.

Around the year 1986, he formed the Swedish independent label Radium 226.05 and in 1990 he formed the label Anckarström.

In 2012, Von Hausswolff was heavily criticized for allegedly using ashes of Holocaust victims from the Majdanek concentration camp in a painting. As of 12 December 2012, the Martin Bryder Gallery in Lund had pulled the painting from exhibition.

In 2019, von Hausswolff formed a new musical collaboration with the Icelandic musician Jónsi (Sigur Rós), which they named Dark Morph. On 10 May 2019, they released their first album, also titled Dark Morph. The project "promises to explore the ramifications of ongoing environmental collapse to the oceans and its inhabitants." The album consists mainly of ambient sounds, often simulating the sounds of animals and nature, and contains very few actual melodies.

Carl Michael is the father of musician/composer Anna von Hausswolff.
