= Thank You for Your Service (2015 film) =

- Theatrical release poster
- Directed by: Tom Donahue
- Produced by: Ilan Arboleda; Tom Donahue; Patty Casby; Steve Edwards; Jacques Levy; Regina Kulik Scully; Gerald Sprayregen; Matt Tyson; Kate Lacey-Kiley
- Starring: Robert Gates; Mike Mullen; David Petreaus; Loree Sutton; Sebastian Junger; Nicholas Kristof; Dexter Filkins; Patty Murray; Rudy Giuliani; Lawrence Wilkerson; Dave Sutherland
- Cinematography: Peter Bolte; Justin M. Garcia
- Edited by: Jill Schweitzer
- Music by: Leigh Roberts
- Distributed by: Gathr Films
- Release date: November 13, 2015 (Doc NYC)
- Running time: 88 minutes
- Country: United States
- Language: English

Thank You for Your Service is a 2015 documentary film by Tom Donahue that focuses on our superficial understanding of war trauma and the failed policies that result. Observing the systemic neglect, the film argues for significant internal change and offers a roadmap for hope. The film premiered at DOC NYC in November 2015.

== Synopsis ==
Thank You for Your Service chronicles mental health amongst U.S. military veterans. The film interweaves the stories of four struggling Iraq War veterans with candid interviews of top military and civilian leaders. Among the interviewees are Secretary of Defense Robert Gates, Generals David Petraeus and Loree Sutton, Sebastian Junger, Nicholas Kristof, Dexter Filkins, General Peter Chiarelli, Gary Sinise, Chairman of the Joint Chiefs of Staff, Admiral Mike Mullen, Senator Patty Murray, Mayor Rudy Giuliani, and Colonels Larry Wilkerson and Dave Sutherland. Called “gut-wrenching” and “important” by The New York Times, the film is an examination of failed mental health policy in the U.S. military. The film argues the creation of a Behavioral Health Corps is necessary to ensure accountability in the military chain of command toward mental health.

== Release ==
Thank You for Your Service, premiered at DOC NYC in November 2015.

A CreativeChaos vmg production, the film was produced by Ilan Arboleda, Tom Donahue, and Matt Tyson in association with the Sprayregen Family Foundation and Regina K. Scully & Artemis Rising Foundation (The Invisible War, The Hunting Ground), executive-produced by Gerald Sprayregen and co-executive produced by Regina K. Scully. It won Best Documentary at the 2016 G.I. Film Festival and the Impact Award at the 2016 Illuminate Film Festival. G.I. Film Festival Co-Founder Laura Law-Millett called it "one of the most powerful, impactful films I have ever seen."

After its release at DOC NYC, Thank You for Your Service was shown at the Miami International Film Festival, Santa Barbara International Film Festival, Big Sky Documentary Film Festival, Montclair Film Festival, and Maine International Film Festival, among others.

The film was acquired by Gathr Films, which released it theatrically in September and October 2016 in New York, Los Angeles, and Washington, D.C., using a hybrid distribution model that combined week-long theatrical runs with nationwide one-night GATHR® Theatrical On Demand® screenings.

== Impact ==
The American Red Cross and U.S. Senators Angus King, Patty Murray, Ron Wyden, and Joe Donnelly hosted the D.C. premiere; King and Donnelly attended and participated in a Q&A hosted by CBS' David Martin. The film had its New York premiere aboard the USS Intrepid in New York Harbor, hosted by the Thayer Leader Development Group at West Point.

U.S. Senator Angus King (I-ME) wrote about the film:

"Art has the power to raise awareness of important questions and can also often spur us to action. By highlighting the personal struggles of individual service members who returned home from Iraq, Thank You for Your Service is a powerful indictment of our treatment of many of those returning with scars not as clear as those from physical injuries but often no less debilitating. As the film vividly illustrates, in the early years of our post-9/11 wars, the Departments of Defense and Veterans Affairs simply were not prepared to deal with the large numbers of returning veterans who needed access to mental health services. The inescapable conclusion is that when we commit America's men and women to war, we must always think long and hard about how we will take care of them when they return. Raising awareness is the first step in understanding this imperative, and as such, this film acts as both a powerful tribute to those to whom we owe so much as well as a call to a renewed commitment on their behalf."

Legislation based on this film has been proposed to Congress in 2018 under Congressman Seth Moulton as the H.R. 5515, the National Defense Authorization Act (NDAA). This would require an addressing of PTSD issues and the creation of mental health services in all sectors of the military.

== Reception ==
In its review, The Hollywood Reporter wrote, “If this film cannot spur politicians to act, nothing will.”

The Los Angeles Times review stated, "With the same clarity and fluency he brought to far sunnier material in Casting By, Donahue pinpoints the devastating intersection of personal trauma and institutional neglect in an age of perpetual war."

Film Journal International wrote, "Eliciting outrage and shame in equal measure, Thank You for Your Service details the lack of mental-health support offered to the men and women of the United States Armed Forces—and the tragic consequence of that neglect."
