= Tom Donahue (filmmaker) =

American film director and producer

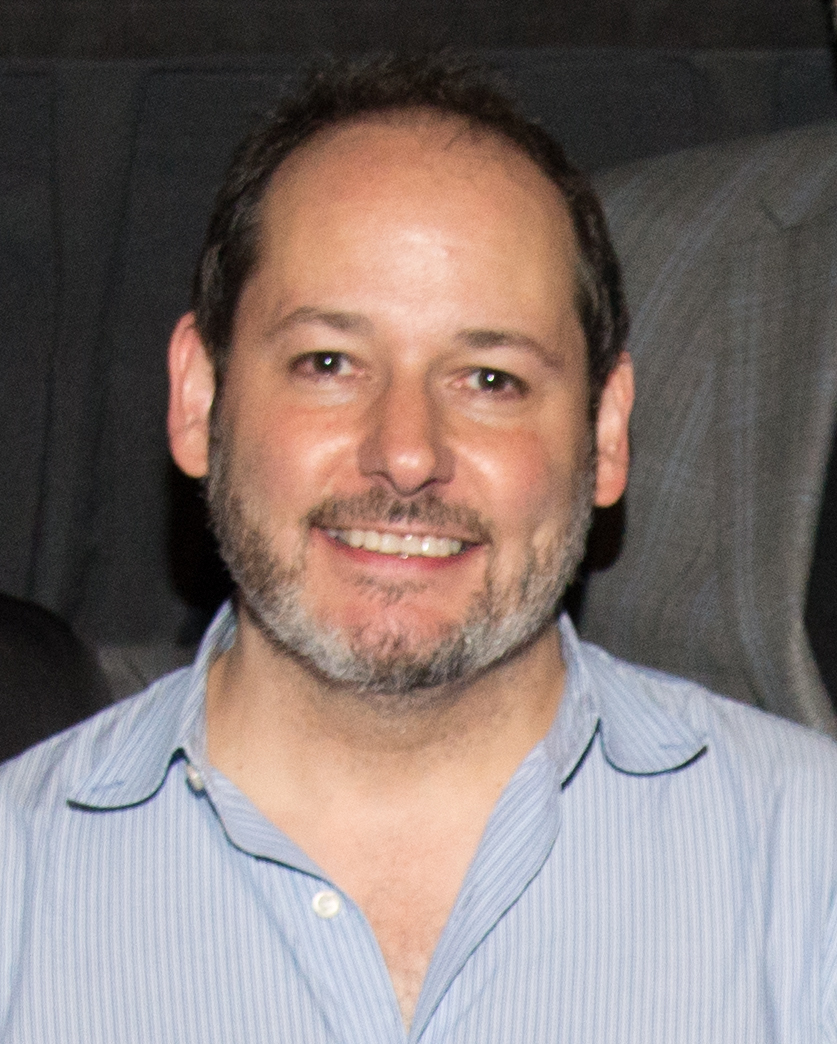
- Donahue in 2016
- Born: May 18, 1968 (age 58); Rhinebeck, New York
- Occupations: Film director, producer

Tom Donahue (born May 18, 1968) is an American film director, producer, and showrunner known for historical and cultural documentary filmmaking. He wrote and directed the Emmy-nominated Paramount+ docuseries Mafia Spies (2024), based on Thomas Maier’s book about CIA–Mafia assassination plots against Fidel Castro. In 2025, it was announced that Donahue would direct The Dream Factory of Oz, a feature documentary about the making of the 1939 film The Wizard of Oz, produced by Leonardo DiCaprio’s Appian Way, Verdi Productions, and Danny Strong Productions. His previous work includes This Changes Everything (Netflix/STARZ), Dean Martin: King of Cool (TCM), and the Emmy-nominated HBO documentaries Casting By and Thank You for Your Service.

Other work includes the feature documentary This Changes Everything (STARZ, Netflix), which he directed and produced, about systemic gender bias and discrimination against women in entertainment; TCM's Dean Martin: King of Cool, a portrait of the legendary entertainer; and Netflix's Los Tigres del Norte at Folsom Prison (nominated for two Latin Grammys and winning one). All of these films and series were produced by Donahue and Ilan Arboleda under the banner of their independent production studio, CreativeChaos vmg.

In 2020, This Changes Everything won the Gracie Award for Best Documentary from the Alliance for Women in Media. In 2021, it won Best Documentary from The Los Angeles Press Club. He and Arboleda also recently produced HBO's Bleed Out, about director Steve Burrow’s clash with the American healthcare system. In 2019, The Los Angeles Press Club awarded Bleed Out Best Documentary. Donahue also directed HBO's Casting By and Thank You for Your Service, released theatrically by Gathr Films in 2016.

== Film career ==
=== As director ===
Donahue co-directed an episode of the 10-part AFI series, 100 Years/100 Movies (with Linda Schaffer), which was broadcast on TNT in 1998. It was called The Antiheroes, and included interviews with Martin Scorsese, Clint Eastwood and Paul Schrader and was narrated by James Woods. The series was executive produced by Richard Schickel and Mel Stuart.

In 2005, Donahue directed the narrative short, Thanksgiving (starring James Urbaniak and Seymour Cassel & written by Sean Gullette).

He made his feature documentary debut with Guest of Cindy Sherman (as co-director with Paul H-O) which premiered at the 2008 Tribeca Film Festival. The film opened theatrically in March 2009 and had its broadcast premiere on the Sundance Channel in May 2009.

Nathan Lee wrote in The New York Times, "At once a fascinating behind-the-scenes glimpse, bittersweet autobiography and witty trip down art-world memory lane". John Anderson wrote in Variety,

If a doc manages to inform and entertain, it's ahead of the competition. If it features engaging personalities (or penguins), so much the better. And if it manages not to lose its assets while dipping its toe into murkier issues -- becoming, say, a brow-knitting thumb-sucker -- then it's really a work of art; such is Guest of Cindy Sherman.

Donahue directed the feature documentary, Casting By, which was hailed as one of the top five documentary films of 2013 by the National Board of Review and reviewed as "outstanding" by American film critic Leonard Maltin. It premiered at the 2012 Toronto International Film Festival (where it was picked up for broadcast by HBO Documentary Films). It premiered domestically at the 2012 New York Film Festival. Casting By was lauded by the Casting Society of America. The Academy of Motion Picture Arts and Sciences announced five days before Casting By's premiere on HBO that its Board of Governors had approved the creation of a branch for casting directors. On the night of the 29th Annual Artios Awards hosted by the Casting Society of America, the Casting By filmmakers received a standing ovation for its pivotal role in spurring Academy recognition.

Casting By (2013) examined the work of casting directors and the lack of Academy Award recognition for casting as a distinct discipline within filmmaking. In June 2025, Vulture described the film as having helped “spur the movement for Oscar recognition” of casting directors.

On February 8, 2024, the Academy of Motion Picture Arts and Sciences announced the creation of a competitive Academy Award category for Achievement in Casting, to be awarded beginning with the 98th Academy Awards for films released in 2025.

In 2014, it won the Gracie Award for Outstanding Documentary of the Year from the National Alliance for Women in Media. In July 2014, the film was nominated for the News & Documentary Emmy Award for Outstanding Arts and Culture Programming.

Donahue's feature documentary, Thank You For Your Service, premiered at DOC NYC in November 2015. Called "gut-wrenching" and "important" by The New York Times, the film is an examination of failed mental health policy in the U.S. military. The film argues the creation of a Behavioral Health Corps is necessary to ensure accountability in the military chain of command toward mental health. Thank You For Your Service includes interviews with Secretary of Defense Robert Gates, General David Petraeus, General Loree Sutton, General Peter Chiarelli, Gary Sinise, Sebastian Junger and Chairman of the Joint Chiefs of Staff, Admiral Mike Mullen. These interviews are interwoven with the experiences of four combat veterans who fought major battles while deployed in Operations Iraqi Freedom (OIF) and Enduring Freedom (OEF).

In its review, The Hollywood Reporter wrote, "If this film cannot spur politicians to act, nothing will."

The Los Angeles Times review stated, "With the same clarity and fluency he brought to far sunnier material in Casting By, Donahue pinpoints the devastating intersection of personal trauma and institutional neglect in an age of perpetual war."

A CreativeChaos vmg production, the film was produced by Ilan Arboleda, Matt Tyson and Donahue in association with the Sprayregen Family Foundation and Regina K. Scully & Artemis Rising Foundation (The Invisible War, The Hunting Ground), executive-produced by Gerald Sprayregen and co-executive produced by Regina K. Scully. It won Best Documentary at the 2016 G.I. Film Festival and the Impact Award at the 2016 Illuminate Film Festival. G.I. Film Festival Co-founder Laura Law-Millett called it "one of the most powerful, impactful films I have ever seen."

It was acquired by Gathr Films and opened theatrically in September / October 2016 in New York, Los Angeles and Washington, D.C. The American Red Cross and U.S. Senators Angus King, Patty Murray, Ron Wyden, and Joe Donnelly hosted the D.C. premiere; King and Donnelly attended and participated in a Q&A hosted by CBS' David Martin. The film had its New York premiere aboard the USS Intrepid in New York Harbor, hosted by the Thayer Leader Development Group at West Point.

U.S. Senator Angus King (I-ME) wrote about the film:

"Art has the power to raise awareness of important questions and can also often spur us to action. By highlighting the personal struggles of individual service members who returned home from Iraq, Thank You For Your Service is a powerful indictment of our treatment of many of those returning with scars not as clear as those from physical injuries but often no less debilitating. As the film vividly illustrates, in the early years of our post-9/11 wars, the Departments of Defense and Veterans Affairs simply were not prepared to deal with the large numbers of returning veterans who needed access to mental health services. The inescapable conclusion is that when we commit America's men and women to war, we must always think long and hard about how we will take care of them when they return. Raising awareness is the first step in understanding this imperative, and as such, this film acts as both a powerful tribute to those to whom we owe so much as well as a call to a renewed commitment on their behalf."

=== This Changes Everything ===
In September 2018, Donahue's much anticipated feature documentary This Changes Everything premiered at the Toronto International Film Festival to critical acclaim and positive audience reception, earning it the festival's first runner-up for the Grolsch People's Choice Award for the documentary category. The film received multiple standing ovations and was only the second documentary to be shown in Toronto's iconic 2600-seat Roy Thomson Hall. Donahue both directed and produced the film (along with producers Ilan Arboleda of CreativeChaos vmg and Kerianne Flynn of New Plot Films). The film was created in association with Geena Davis Institute on Gender in Media, Artemis Rising Foundation, David Yurman and Lyft Entertainment. The film explores the issues surrounding gender inequality in Hollywood and has since screened in over 20 film festivals in North America and Europe.

On January 17, 2019, Deadline Hollywood announced that This Changes Everything’s theatrical, streaming and broadcast rights for North America had been acquired by Good Deed Entertainment and that the film would be released theatrically in the first half of 2019.

This Changes Everything also won the Greg Gund Memorial Standing Up Competition at the Cleveland International Film Festival In April 2019. The film had its premiere on 700+ screens via Fathom Releasing on July 22nd followed by a limited theatrical release on August 9th.

On October 27, 2019, the Academy of Motion Pictures Arts and Sciences awarded Geena Davis with the Jean Hersholt Humanitarian Award for her work profiled in This Changes Everything. Lina Wertmuller (who is mentioned in the documentary as the film director that inspired Maria Giese to become a filmmaker) was also honored with a Life Achievement Award.

In her review for The New York Times, Aisha Harris called the film “passionate... a crucial Cri de Coeur” and Ashley Lee from The Washington Post called it “searing”.

Pete Hammond from Deadline called the film “powerful and fascinating”. He writes, “Some might believe that this movie especially, considering the subject matter, should be helmed by a woman. Donahue, however, is the one who got it made and feels correctly that it is as much if not more important to open the eyes of men in this regard.”

In his Variety review, Peter Debruge writes, “There’s something to be said for solidarity shown by those who have nothing to gain from their support beyond the advancement of the greater good. So, like white people at a Black Lives Matter rally or straight folks at a Gay Pride parade, Donahue deserves credit for proactively going out of his way to make a movie that tells it like it is — and paints it as it could be.”

The film had its cable premiere on Starz on December 16, 2019.

=== Los Tigres Del Norte at Folsom Prison ===
In 2018, Donahue directed the Netflix Original, Los Tigres Del Norte at Folsom Prison which premiered on Netflix on September 15, 2019.

The band visited Folsom Prison in April 2018 to honor the 50th anniversary of Johnny Cash's legendary performance there. They performed two concerts -one for the male prisoners and one for the female (filmed the next day at the Folsom Women's Facility). Donahue and his team filmed the concerts but also interviewed 22 of the inmates (10 men and 12 women). The documentary (which includes narration by the members of the band) interweaves their stories with the songs performed.

The film was produced by Zach Horowitz (former Chairman/CEO of Universal Music Publishing Group) and Ilan Arboleda and executive produced by Horowitz. The music was produced by Gustavo Santaolalla, a two-time Oscar winner and winner of many Latin Grammys, and his production partner Anibal Kerpel. A live album was released concurrently. This was the first live album recorded at Folsom Prison since Cash's 50 years before.

The documentary was one of the most popular documentaries on Netflix in 2019 in Latin America

=== Dean Martin: King of Cool ===
Donahue's feature documentary, Dean Martin: King of Cool premiered November 19, 2021 on TCM. The film was produced by Ilan Arboleda and Donahue and executive produced by Leonardo DiCaprio, Danny Strong, Paul Barry and Peter Greenwald. Produced over 6 years, the film includes 45 interviews with family (inc. Deana Martin and Anne Haren), colleagues (inc. Angie Dickinson, Norman Lear, Bob Newhart, Carol Burnett, George Schlatter, Florence Henderson and Lee Hale) and fans (inc. RZA, Jon Hamm, Alec Baldwin, Peter Bogdanovich and Regis Philbin). It currently holds a 100% rating on Rotten Tomatoes.

=== Murder of God's Banker ===
In 2022, Donahue wrote and directed the four-part true crime docuseries, Murder of God's Banker for Viacom International Studios. Combining interviews, motion comix animation and re-enactments, the series uses the death of Vatican Banker Roberto Calvi's murder in June 1982 as the launching point for an investigation into the corrupt secret societies of Italy, including the Vatican, the Sicilian Mafia and Propaganda Due, the Fascist Italian sect of the Freemasons. Variety wrote, “The documentary uses archival footage, stylized dramatizations and interviews with notable journalists and historians to uncover the truth behind Calvi’s murder while delving into the layers of corruption at the root of global money and power.”

The series was executive produced by Donahue, Ilan Arboleda and Mike Holtz, co-executive produced by Jordan Bogdanovage and Jessicya Materano and produced by Ari Tan. The series premiered in 35+ countries in February, 2023 (on Paramount Plus in the United States). It was called “riveting” by The Daily Mail.

=== Mafia Spies (2024) ===
In 2024, Donahue wrote and directed the six-part Paramount+ docuseries Mafia Spies, based on Thomas Maier’s 2019 nonfiction book. The series examines CIA collaboration with American organized crime figures in attempts to assassinate Cuban leader Fidel Castro during the Cold War. On-location segments were filmed in Havana, Cuba (with additional location work in Mexico City).

The series received positive critical reception. Chicago Sun-Times critic Richard Roeper awarded it 3.5 out of 4 stars, calling it “one of the more entertaining documentary series of the year.”

Composer Leigh Roberts received a News & Documentary Emmy Award nomination for Outstanding Music Composition (Documentary) for his score for the series.

=== Oz (2026) ===
In November 2025, Variety reported that Leonardo DiCaprio’s Appian Way, Verdi Productions, and Danny Strong Productions partnered to produce The Dream Factory of Oz, a feature documentary about the making of the 1939 film The Wizard of Oz, with Donahue attached to direct. The film examines the production history and enduring cultural legacy of the MGM classic. Reenactment filming began in Rhode Island in 2025. The film is slated for release in 2026.

=== Break Out (TBA) ===
In 2025, Deadline reported that Morgan Freeman and Lori McCreary’s Revelations Entertainment joined Donahue’s animated feature documentary Break Out as executive producers. The film follows a same-sex couple seeking safety amid escalating anti-LGBTQ laws in Russia and the invasion of Ukraine, blending first-person testimony with animation and reenactments.

== As producer ==
In 2003, Donahue produced and edited Alfredo de Villa's debut feature, Washington Heights, winner of five Best Picture awards at festivals worldwide, the Audience Award at Los Angeles Film Festival, and Special Jury Award at the Tribeca Film Festival. Washington Heights also received a Gotham Award nomination for the IFP Open Palm Award.

Donahue was co-producer on Ramin Bahrani's debut feature, Man Push Cart, which premiered at the 2006 Sundance Film Festival. He produced the feature documentary, Highway Courtesans (directed by Mystelle Brabbee), which had its world premiere at the International Documentary Film Festival Amsterdam and its U.S. premiere at South by Southwest.

He produced the feature film Ponies, directed by Nick Sandow (Orange Is the New Black) and starring John Ventimiglia (The Sopranos) and Kevin Corrigan. It was named a New York Times Critics Pick upon its release in 2012.

Donahue produced the 13-part documentary series On the Team for Nickelodeon. He also produced the HBO feature documentary Bleed Out alongside Ilan Arboleda and Steve Burrows. The film was directed by Burrows and premiered on December 17, 2018. Paste Magazine called it “brutal, unmissable viewing.” The Los Angeles Press Club awarded the film Best Documentary and runner-up for Best Medical/Health Reporting at its annual National Arts and Entertainment Journalism Awards and SoCal Journalism Awards in July 2019.

=== Married to El Chapo: Emma Coronel Speaks (2025) ===
In 2025, Donahue served as Co-Executive Producer on the Oxygen documentary special Married to El Chapo: Emma Coronel Speaks. The film features interviews with Emma Coronel Aispuro, the wife of Joaquín “El Chapo” Guzmán, and examines her account of her marriage, the Sinaloa cartel, and the legal consequences surrounding Guzmán’s arrest and conviction. The special aired on Oxygen (NBCUniversal) and streams on Peacock.

== As editor ==
Donahue's first narrative feature as editor was Raphael Nadjari's The Shade (starring Richard Edson). The film premiered at the 1999 Cannes Film Festival in the Un Certain Regard section. He also edited Raphael Nadjari's next two films, I am Josh Polonsky's Brother and Apartment #5C (which premiered as part of the 2002 Cannes Directors' Fortnight).

He edited the IFC Films feature documentary, Keep the River on Your Right based on the book of the same name by Tobias Schneebaum. The film won the 2001 Gotham Spirit Truer than Fiction Award & the Jury Prize at the International Documentary Film Festival Amsterdam.

In 2005, Donahue edited IFC's Wanderlust, a feature doc/narrative directed by Shari Springer Berman and Robert Pulcini and starring Paul Rudd and Tom McCarthy.

For television, Donahue edited several episodes of Showtime's acclaimed live action version of Ira Glass' This American Life (nominated for three Emmys in 2007). He edited the pilots for the reality series, Growing Up Gotti, I Pity the Fool, Heroes Among Us and The Cho Show and has edited episodes of Iconoclasts, Salt'N Pepa, Kimora: Life in the Fab Lane and HBO's Real Sex.

== CreativeChaos vmg ==
CreativeChaos vmg is an independent film and television production company founded in 2010 by Tom Donahue, Ilan Arboleda, and Steve Edwards (d. 2021). Based in New York and Los Angeles, the company develops and produces documentary features, docuseries, and television programming focused on cultural, political, and historical subjects.

Projects produced under the CreativeChaos banner include Casting By (HBO), Thank You for Your Service, This Changes Everything (Starz/Netflix), Bleed Out (HBO), Los Tigres Del Norte at Folsom Prison (Netflix), Dean Martin: King of Cool (TCM), Murder of God’s Banker (Paramount+), and Mafia Spies (Paramount+). The company is also producing The Dream Factory of Oz and Break Out.

== Filmography ==
=== Features ===
Year	Title	Role	Rotten Tomatoes
2003	Washington Heights	Producer, Editor	79%
2006	Man Push Cart	Co-Producer	88%
2006	Highway Courtesans	Co-Producer	50%
2008	Guest of Cindy Sherman	Co-director	71%
2012	Ponies	Director	Not yet rated
2012	Casting By	Co-Producer	94%
2015	Thank You for Your Service	Co-Producer	Not yet rated
2016	Davi's Way	Co-Producer	100%
2018	This Changes Everything	Co-Producer	85%
2018	Bleed Out	Co-Producer	86%
2019	Los Tigres Del Norte at Folsom Prison	Director	Not yet rated
2021	Dean Martin: King of Cool	Director, Producer, Editor	100%
2024	The Dream Factory of Oz	Director – In production	Not yet rated
TBA	Break Out	Director – In development	Not yet rated

=== Television ===
Year	Title	Role	Rotten Tomatoes
2001	On the Team	Co-produced with Maude Chilton and Jarret Engle	Not yet rated
2005	Thanksgiving		Not yet rated
2023	Murder of God's Banker	Writer, Director, and Executive Producer	Not yet rated
2024	Mafia Spies	Writer, Director, Executive Producer – Paramount+	Not yet rated
2025	Married to El Chapo: Emma Coronel Speaks	Co-Executive Producer— Oxygen (NBCUniversal) / Peacock	Not yet rated

=== Professional memberships ===
Donahue is a member of the following organizations, the Academy of Motion Picture Arts & Sciences, the British Academy of Film & Television Arts, and the Academy of Television Arts & Sciences (ATAS).
