= Audition =

Sample performance by a performer

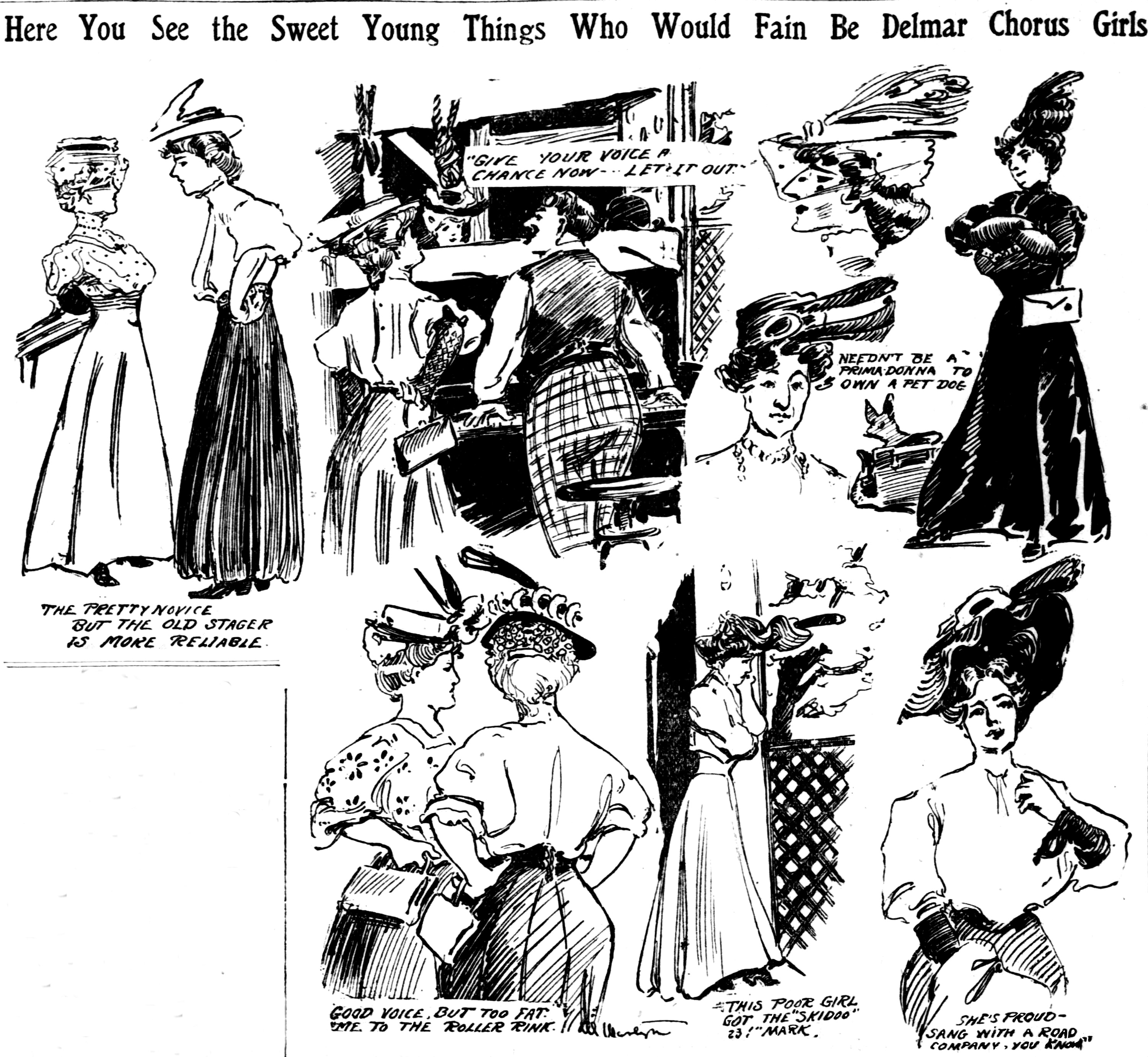
Sketches by artist Marguerite Martyn of women trying out for the chorus at the Delmar Theater in St. Louis in May 1906, with quotations from some of those pictured

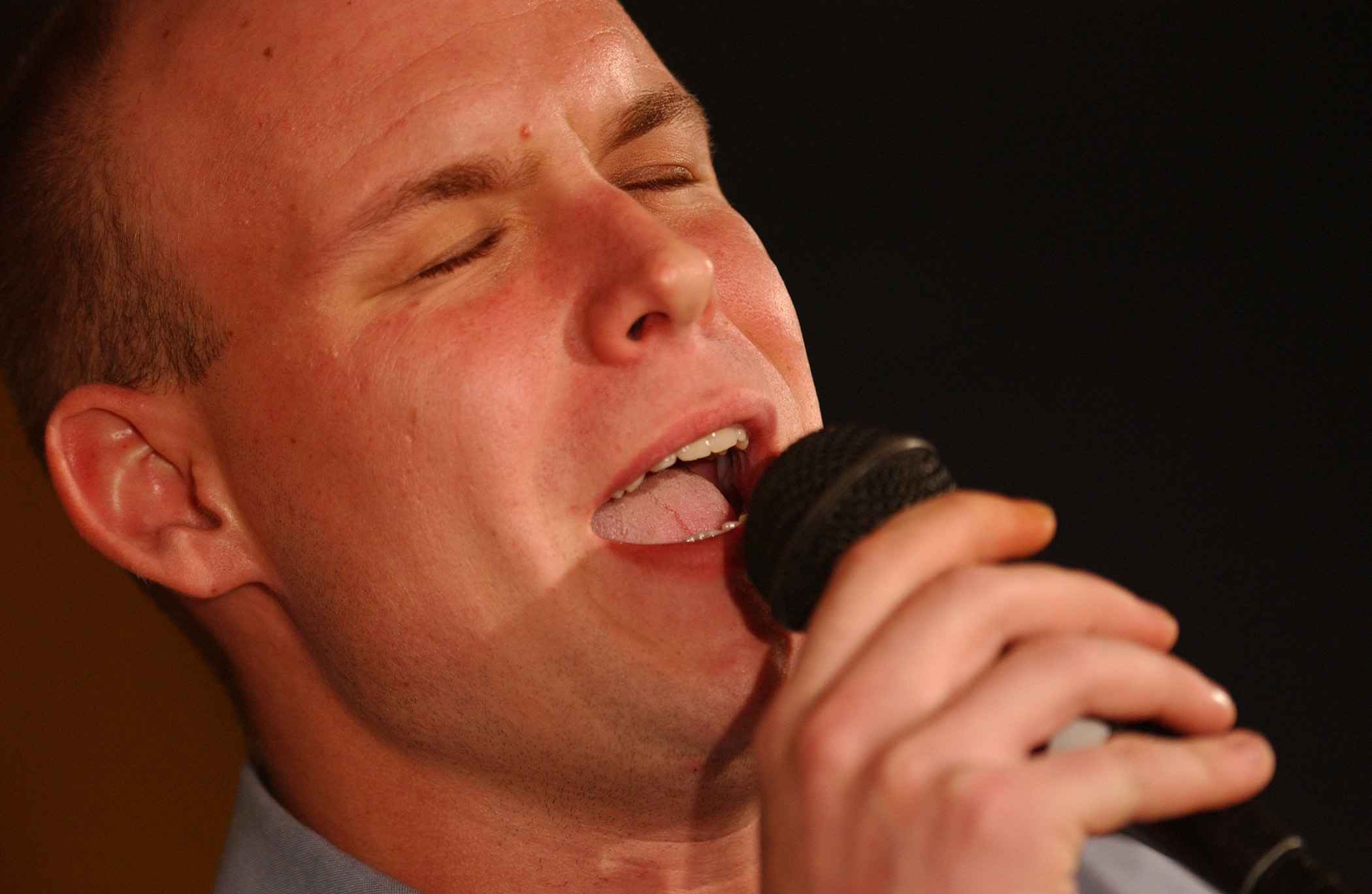
A singer performing a live audition in front of judges on TV for Fox's American Idol reality television series.

An audition is a sample performance by an actor, singer, musician, dancer or other performer. It typically involves the performer displaying their talent through a previously memorized and rehearsed solo piece or by performing a work or piece given to the performer at the audition or shortly before. In some cases, such as with a model or acrobat, the individual may be asked to demonstrate a range of professional skills. Actors may be asked to present a monologue. Singers will perform a song in a popular music context or an aria in a Classical context. A dancer will present a routine in a specific style, such as ballet, tap dance or hip-hop, or show their ability to quickly learn a choreographed dance piece.

The audition is a systematic process in which industry professionals select performers, which is in some ways analogous to a job interview in the regular job market. In an audition, the employer is testing the ability of the applicant to meet the needs of the job and assess how well the individual will take directions and deal with changes. After some auditions, after the performer has demonstrated their abilities in a given performance style, the audition panel may ask a few questions that resemble those used in standard job interviews (e.g., regarding availability).

Auditions are required for many reasons in the performing arts world. Often, employing companies or groups use auditions to select performers for upcoming shows or productions. An audition for a performing opportunity may be for a single performance (e.g., doing a monologue at a comedy club), for a series or season of performances (a season of a Broadway play), or for permanent employment with the performing organization (e.g., an orchestra or dance troupe). Auditions for performing opportunities may be for amateur, school, or community organizations, in which case the performers will typically not be paid. As well, auditions are used to select or screen candidates for entry to training programs (ballet school or circus school); university programs (B.Mus, M.Mus, MFA in Theater); performance-related scholarships and grants; or to be considered for representation by a talent agency or individual agent.

== Actors ==
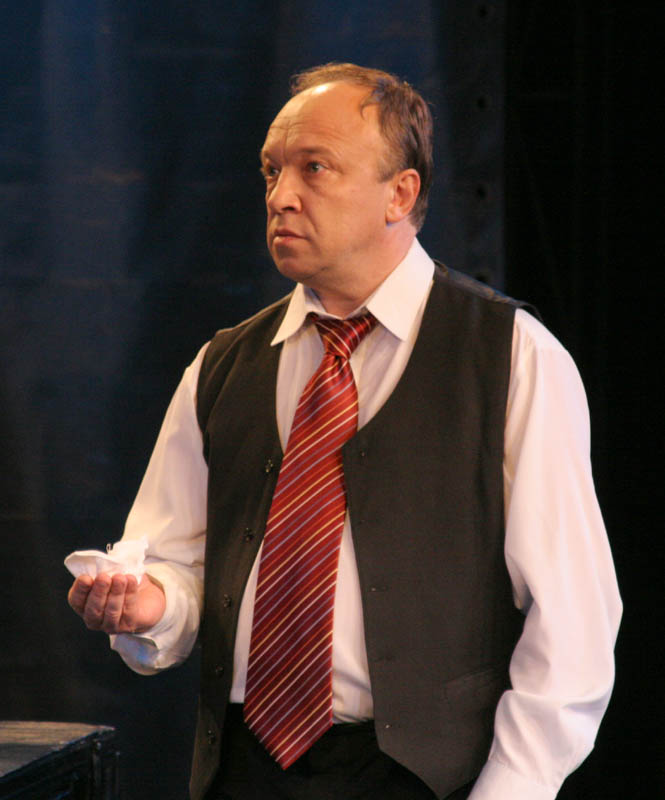
For actors, monologues and speeches are the "calling card" that they use to demonstrate their skills to casting directors.

For actors in theater, film, and TV, the "audition is a systematic process in which industry professionals make final casting decisions. Industry professionals may consist of casting directors, producers, directors or agency representatives". In film and television, the audition is called a screen test, and it is filmed so that the casting director or director can see how the actor appears on screen. Since the COVID-19 pandemic, first-round film and television auditions have commonly been submitted as self-tapes that actors record themselves, a practice that has remained the industry norm.

Auditions are advertised in major media outlets (such as newspaper or radio), industry magazines and newsletters (e.g., auditions for musicians are advertised in the American Federation of Musicians newsletter), audition websites, and through a talent/casting agencies. Some performers hire an agent, to be able to draw on the agent's connections with casting directors and performing arts companies. However, the agent will take a cut (often 10–20%) of the performer's earnings. Although an actor's talents are crucial criteria in the casting process, an almost equal amount of attention is given to an actor's "type", (a combination of personality, looks and general casting intuition) as required for a particular production.

Actors who are selecting an audition piece may select a monologue by a character who is close to their own age. They may wear neutral clothing that allows freedom of movement. Auditionees may avoid going over the stated time limit. By convention, some actors choose to not direct their speech to the audition panel if they are doing an on-stage audition. In some cases, the audition panel may request that the auditionee interacts with them (e.g., a director may ask the actor to speak the lines while looking directly at the director). An actor who is doing an audition may warm up before the audition, like an athlete would, although with an actor, a warm up might include vocal exercises in addition to stretching. Just as with any interview outside of the performing arts world, an auditionee may dress well. Even if the auditionee does not have expensive clothing, simple clothing may be acceptable if it is clean and of good quality. Auditionees know casting directors are also considering "whether or not the actor will be easy to work with, that they know what they are doing and can take direction well".

== Music ==
=== Popular music ===
==== Instrumentalists ====
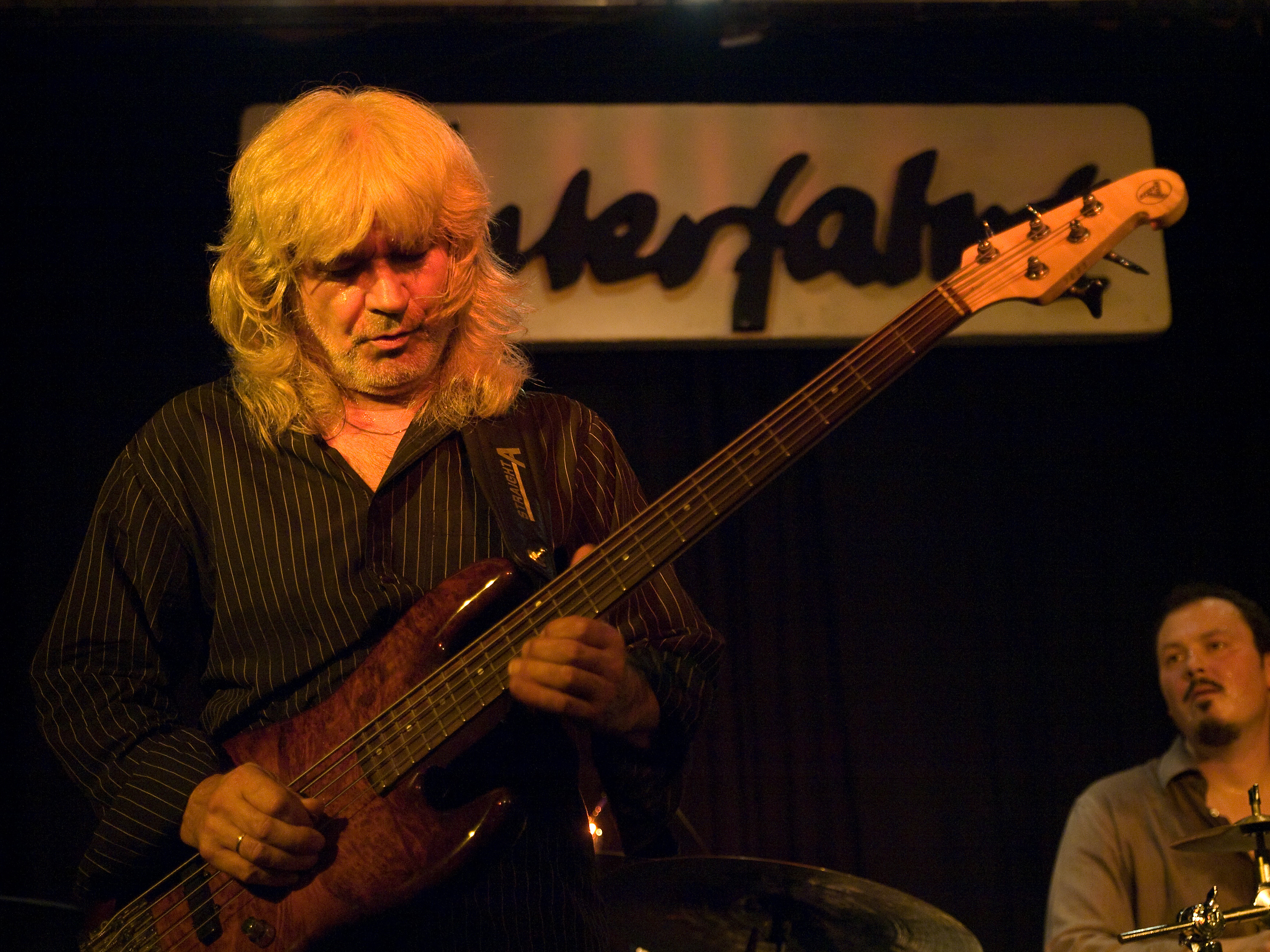
A bassist auditioning for a pop band might be asked to play basslines from a range of different styles.

In some styles of music, such as jazz-oriented stage bands, instrumentalists may be asked to sight read printed music at various levels of difficulty. In jazz groups, auditionees may be asked to perform standard pieces (e.g., a jazz standard such as "Now's the Time") with an ensemble. Similarly, in a rock or blues band, auditionees may be asked to play a rock or blues standard. An auditionee for a rhythm section role (rhythm guitar, electric bass, drumkit, etc.) will be asked to play a range of standard styles or "feels" which are used in a given style. For example, a drummer applying to play in a jazz band might be asked to play a slow ballad, a medium "standard", and an up-tempo swing style. A bassist auditioning for a pop band might be asked to play in a Motown style bassline, a syncopated 1970s funk "slapping" style line, and a reggae-style bassline. A person auditioning for a role as a rhythm section member in some styles of music may be expected to be able to demonstrate the ability to perform as a backup singer.

A performer auditioning for a solo or "lead" instrument role will typically perform prepared solos that showcase a range of skills, including the ability to perform a melody with sensitivity and expression; the ability to play virtuosic passages; and, in some styles (e.g., fusion jazz or blues), the ability to improvise a melody over a chord progression. In some popular genres, there is relatively less emphasis on "stage presence" and movement onstage, such as classic jazz or traditional 1950s-style country music. In these styles, there is more of a focus on the sound of the music and the expressiveness of the performer with their voice or instrument. In other genres, such as heavy metal "shred guitar" or hardcore punk, it may be very important that a performer can move about in a dramatic fashion onstage. One of the differences between instrumentalist auditions in rock music styles and Classical styles is that in a rock context, the performers will be expected to have memorized most or all of the music. In a Classical context, most or all of the music is read from sheet music (with the exception of a solo Bach suite movement or a solo concerto movement).

==== Singers ====
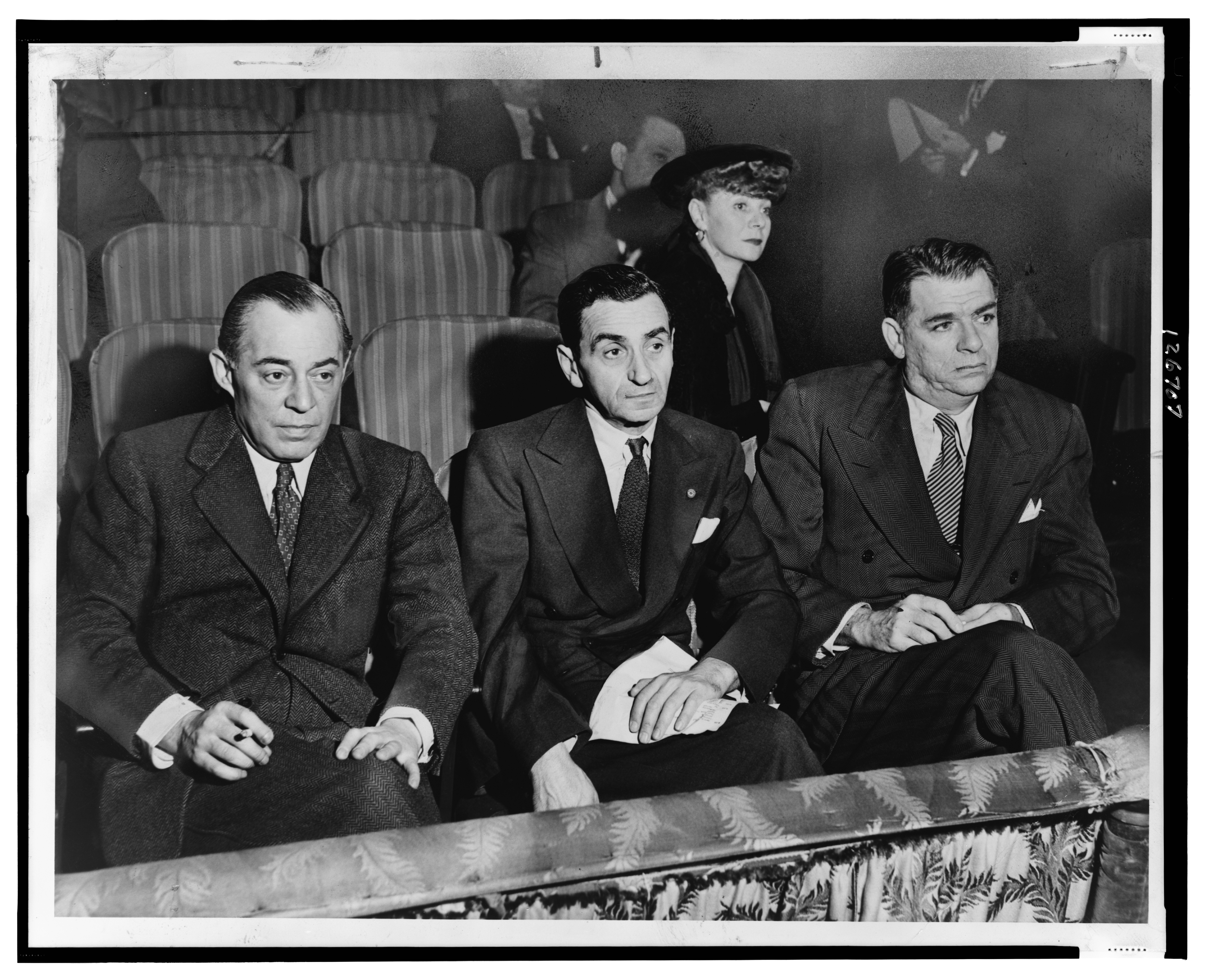
Irving Berlin, Rodgers and Hammerstein, and Helen Tamiris watching music theater auditions

For rock, country, and other forms of popular music, auditions are used to test the ability of an instrumentalist or singer to perform a specific style of music, or several styles. A singer auditioning for a role in a musical theatre production would not, unless instructed otherwise, need to sing opera or country music, and a musician auditioning for a seat in an orchestra would not perform rock. Occasionally a musical theatre audition may require the performer to sing a song in the genre to which the musical pertains. For instance, a singer auditioning for Destry Rides Again may be asked to sing a standard country-western song. A person auditioning for The Rocky Horror Show may be asked to sing a standard rock song. As well, in some cases, an audition may require a performer to demonstrate pieces in several styles. A hard rock band auditioning a new singer may request that the individual perform songs from heavy metal and related styles such as blues rock. A pop or rock band that is selecting a new lead singer that has whittled the number of applicants down to the top two or three singers may test out how the singers perform in live shows by performing a few live concerts with each guest singer. This allows the band to see how the singer performs in a full multi-hour concert, including how well the singer can develop a rapport with the audience, deal with the inevitable problems that occur in live music (e.g., microphones failing or stage lights malfunctioning), and maintain their vocal endurance until the end of the evening.

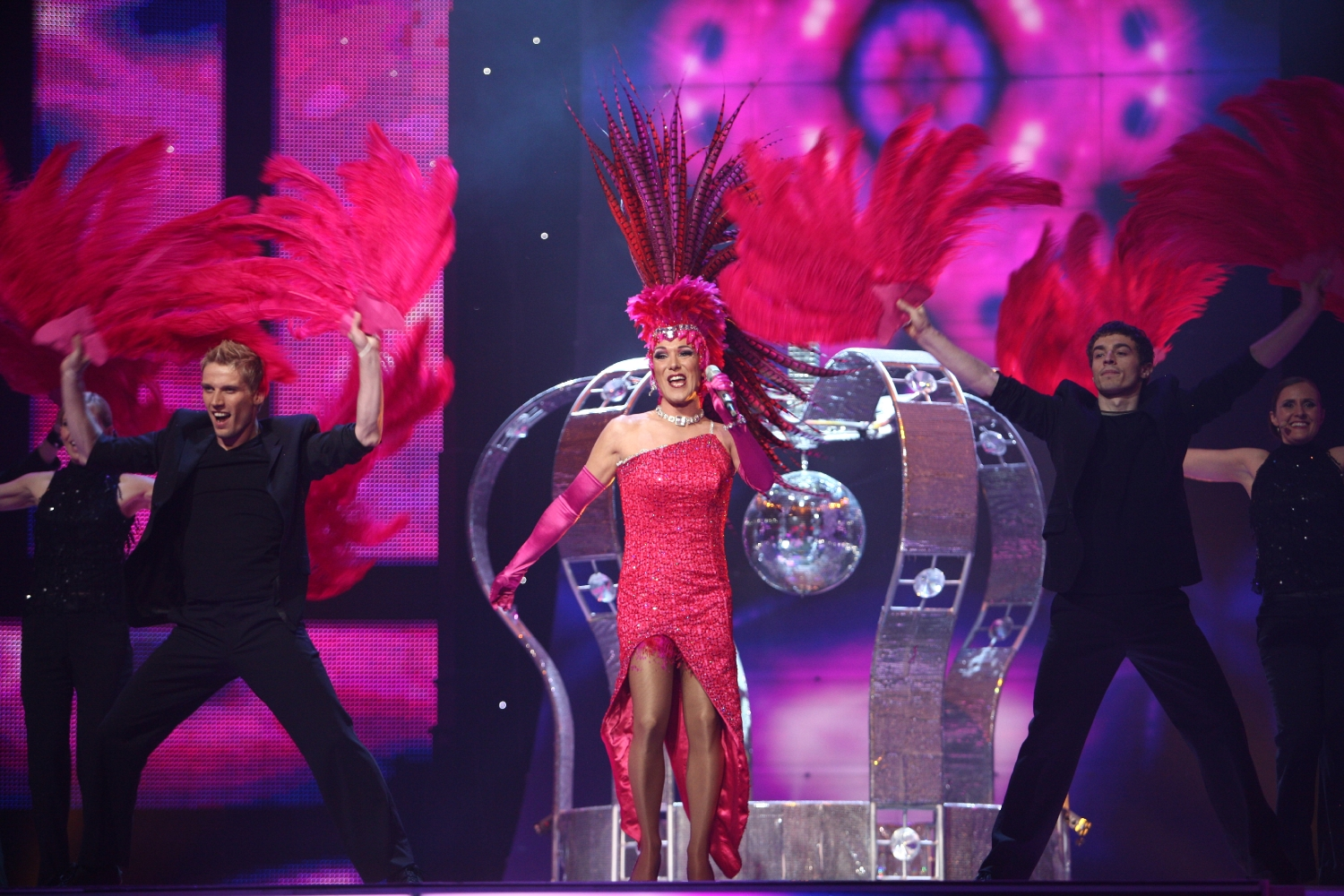
A contestant in the Eurovision Song Contest tries to impress the judges at her live audition

For smaller roles in a large musical theater production, mass auditions are held at which many inexperienced or aspiring performers, most without agents, show up. These are popularly known as "cattle calls", since the hopefuls are often kept together in one large room. The musical A Chorus Line depicts this type of audition. American Idol also auditions its aspiring vocalists using this technique, since there are so many auditions. In musical theater and in pop music styles for which onstage dancing is part of the performance (e.g., hip hop), singers who are doing a vocal audition may also be required to demonstrate that they can dance while singing. In some popular music groups, such as a rock band, a backup singer may be expected to be able to play an instrument while singing, such as strumming a simple rhythm guitar part or playing a percussion instrument (e.g., tambourine or congas). While an ability to sing in multiple languages with the appropriate diction and pronunciation is more associated with Classical music than popular music, there are some popular styles where multiple languages are expected, including Latin jazz styles such as Bossa Nova (Portuguese songs may be requested); Tango (Spanish songs may be requested); folk music (French songs may be requested); and Celtic music (Irish songs may be requested).

=== Classical music ===
In classical music, auditions are used to screen candidates for positions as instrumentalists in chamber groups or orchestras or as soloists, and to screen singers for positions as members of a choir or as solo performers. In classical music, auditions are also used to screen candidates for entry to training programs, university or Conservatory programs or degrees, and training festival activities (e.g., classical summer camps). In comparison with some types of pop music auditions, classical auditions tend to be much more formal. The performer may, by tradition, wear a tuxedo or a formal dress, and the judges may sit behind a desk and write comments on clipboards.

==== Instrumentalists ====
In classical music, each instrument or vocal type has a standard repertoire of music which is commonly requested at auditions. Instrumentalists in an orchestral context are typically asked to perform excerpts from the orchestral literature, including both exposed solos and "tutti" parts which are particularly demanding. Orchestral auditions are typically held in front of a panel that includes the conductor, the concertmaster, and a number of principal players from the orchestra. In the United States since WWII, professional orchestra auditions often include a musician's union representative, who ensures that the audition is being run in a fair manner. A cloth screen may be used at some stages of the audition process, to protect the audition panel from allegations of favouritism or sexism.

In Germany, Austria, and German-speaking Switzerland, the entire orchestra (every tenured member) votes on the musicians auditioning, with the section the musician would join (and sometimes the conductor) having a veto.

An orchestral audition will normally set out a list of orchestral excerpts which each performer has to prepare. Additionally, each performer plays a movement from a sonata or concerto which may be performed with piano accompaniment. When the performer plays the orchestral excerpts, he or she may be given a tempo, or asked to follow the gestures of the conductor.

Orchestral auditions are often run in several stages, to screen candidates and reduce those who are less likely to meet the needs of the job. A large number of applicants typically apply for a professional orchestra job. The orchestra personnel manager then selects the most promising candidates based on the experience and training indicated in the applicants' CVs (and, in some cases, based on the performing ability demonstrated in a recording of the applicant).

This first "cut" of auditionees then perform in front of the audition panel. Typically, in a professional orchestra, this would require the performance of excerpts representing stylistic and technical challenges drawn from repertoire typical to that orchestra. The most promising candidates are invited to return for a second or third round of auditions, which allows the conductor and the panel to compare the best candidates. Performers may be asked to sight read orchestral music.

If a candidate is successful in passing the audition, typically a trial period of several months to a year takes place allowing the chief conductor and principal players to see if the individual can function well in an actual performance setting.

==== Singers ====
There is a standard repertoire of vocal literature for each voice type (e.g., soprano, alto) that is used at auditions for singers. Each sub-type of vocal activity has a separate standard audition repertoire (e.g., choirs, operas, etc.). A person auditioning for a role in a choir will be expected to be able to sight read choral parts. In auditions for opera, a singer will be expected to demonstrate the ability to act out the movements that are associated with the lyrics of the aria, which may include pretending to be dying from a stab wound, miming an activity (e.g., pouring wine), or doing a simple dance routine. Both choral and opera singers are expected to be able to follow the gestures of a conductor in regards to expression and tempo. Since microphones are not used in most classical music performances, the audition panel will be assessing the auditionees ability to project a strong, room-filling vocal tone. In classical music, in addition to judging singing ability (e.g., tone, intonation, etc.), the audition panel will be judging the applicant's ability to use the appropriate diction and pronunciation of the major languages used in Art music: German, Italian, and French. Other languages that the applicant may be asked to sing in include English, Spanish, Portuguese, and Latin.

== Musical theatre ==
Musical theatre is a music-based medium and (as such) it requires a proficient level of musical, acting and dance competence. A musical theatre audition consists of two to three separate auditions culminating in one audition experience: vocal audition, dance audition, and (less common) monologue preparation. For musical theatre, a standard audition consists of two 16–32 measures of selected songs, usually contrasting in some way (style, intention, characters, time period, or all of the above). When listed, there can also be a monologue portion where the actor is asked to perform a one-minute monologue. A headshot and résumé are almost always required. Although auditions vary depending on the theatre, program, or show, this formula is considered "the norm" in the musical theatre world. The purpose of an audition is two-fold. Practically, performers audition to get a callback. "Callbacks", or callback auditions, allow the artistic team to assess a performer's skills in accordance with specific characters. During the callback, the panel has shortlisted a candidate, because they have noted their potential for particular parts. As such, during a callback audition, the candidate is asked to sing the songs performed by certain characters or read their lines. The first audition is not a platform for selling oneself as a particular character; instead, the first audition is a chance for the performer to show off the songs he or she does best.

== Dance ==
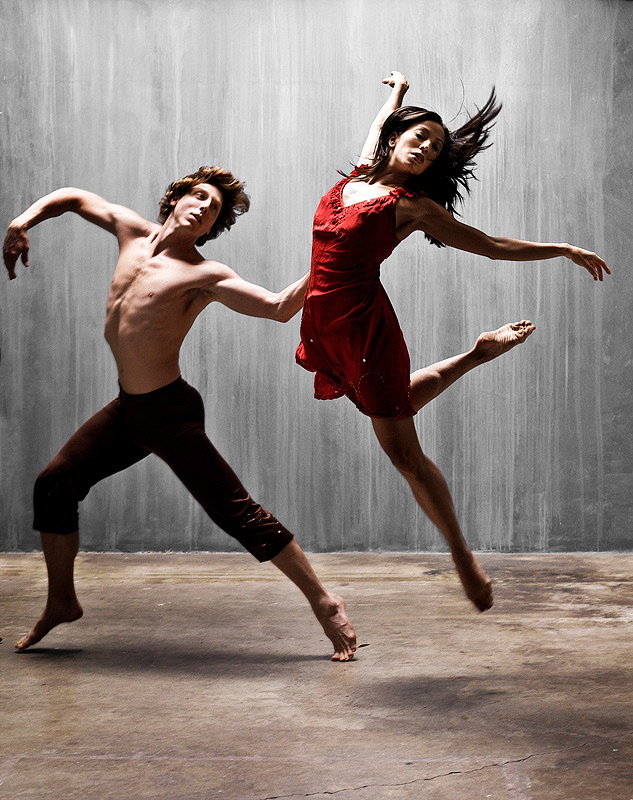
Two dancers performing modern dance, a style in which performers may be asked to demonstrate improvised movements at an audition.

There are many types of dance auditions for different performance venues. Dance companies hire employees for ballet and modern dance shows. Broadway companies hire dancers for traditional musicals (Rodgers and Hammerstein) and more modern dance musicals (e.g., Fame and Grease). Casinos, resorts, amusement parks, and cruise ships hire dancers for revue-style shows that can range from jazz dance to hip-hop. For these shows, some backup singing skills or acting skills may be required. Pop music concert producers and pop music video producers recruit dancers to perform onstage during concerts or during videos. For live pop concerts, onstage dancers may be required to perform simple backup singing. Movie and TV producers also hire dancers for short term shoots; even though a dancer may only get several days of work from a movie or TV show, there may be residual payments. Most auditions specify what type of dance skills are required (e.g., Classical, pointe, contemporary, jazz, hip-hop, etc.). In the case of modern dance, some dance companies ask applicants to demonstrate their ability to improvise dance moves.

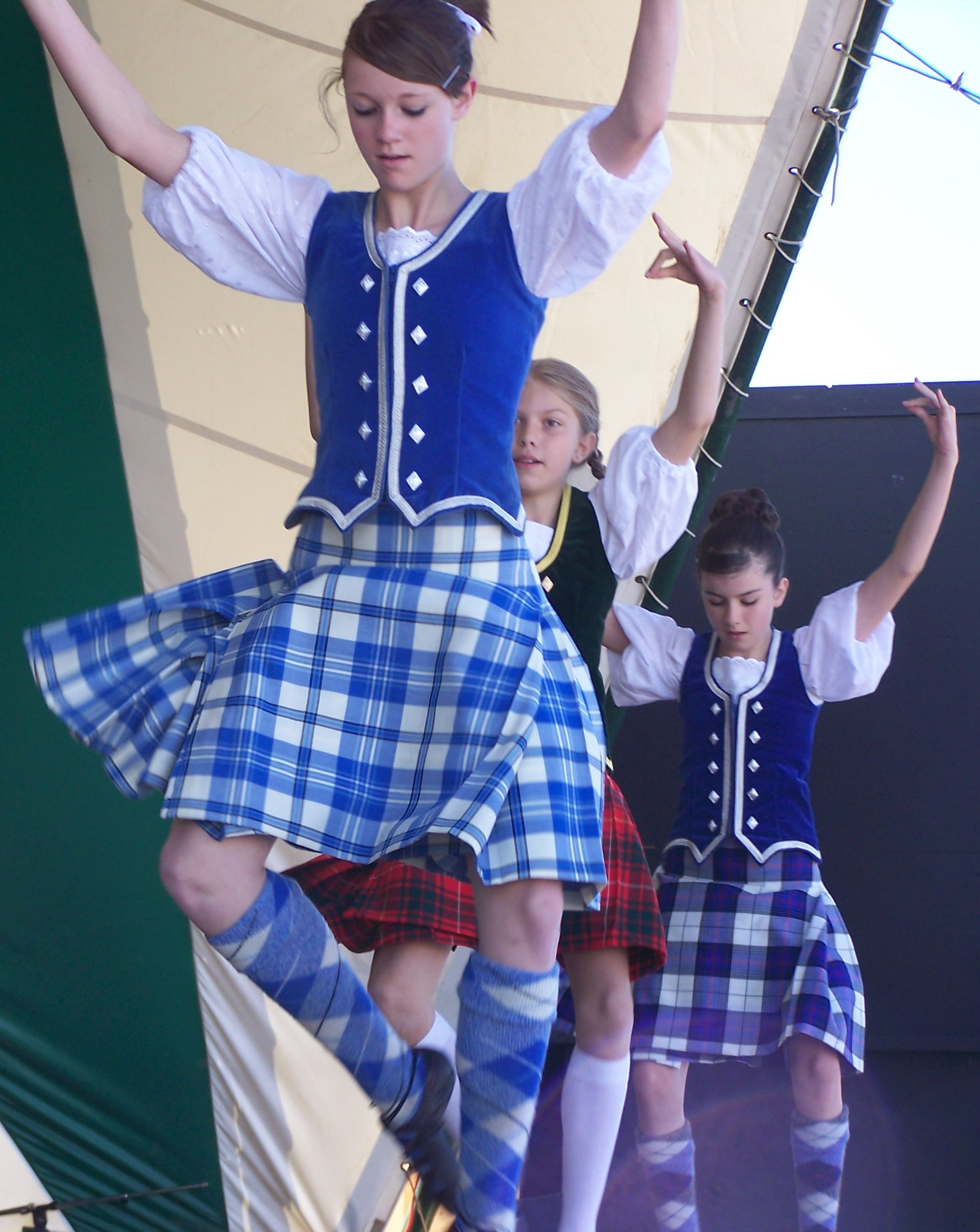
These dancers from the Braziers troupe are performing Highland dancing, a style at which auditionees must demonstrate a high degree of technique and the ability to quickly learn new steps.

Many dance auditions test the ability of applicants to learning new choreography in a short time period, rather than showcasing a prepared work. In other cases, a short prepared solo piece may also be required (about 90 seconds long). Applicants will be instructed in a technical routine or pattern in a group session. Some auditions require applicants to have completed training at a recognised dance school or conservatoire, and in some cases, auditionees may be requested to bring a reference letter from a dance teacher or dance company director (especially in the case of young dancers with little professional experience). At some auditions, applicants are asked to make a short verbal statement about their dancing goals or why they wish to join the troupe. Auditionees should ensure that they know the major dance terms, because the judges may request that certain dance moves be demonstrated.

Dancers are often asked to bring one or two photographs, such as a "headshot" and a full-body photo of the applicant in a dancing pose. The clothing that auditionees need to wear at auditions varies. At some auditions, particularly Classical auditions, there is a strict dress code: applicants wear dance leotards and pointe shoes, and long hair is tied back. Other dance auditions specify loose clothing. For some contemporary dance auditions, applicants must dance barefoot. In some music theater roles, applicants need to bring tap shoes to demonstrate their tap dancing skills. Some auditions where there is a large number of applicants require the performers to wear a number pinned to their shirt, in a similar way to marathon runners. This way, if the casting director sees an exceptional dancer, he or she can take note of the number. Unless jewellery or make-up is an expected part of a dancer's appearance in a certain dance style, dance auditionees generally avoid jewellery and makeup.

In music theater and pop music, there is a lot of crossover between dancing and singing roles. Almost all dancers in music theater and many dancers in pop music will be expected to have some singing ability as a backup singer (singing harmony parts to accompany the solo vocalists). In rarer cases, dancers will be asked to demonstrate the ability to play a musical instrument (e.g., guitar), because there are some shows in which some of the dancer-actors have to play instruments onstage, such as the Threepenny Opera. In music theater, there is also often crossover between dancing and acting roles. Dancers may be expected to be able to take on an acting role and speak lines (often in a supporting role).

Some major dance companies have "open calls" once a year, in which any or almost any applicant can come to demonstrate their dancing skills. At these open calls, the entire group of applicants are taught a dance routine by a choreographer, and then the group of dancers performs the routine while judges assess their performance. It can be hard for a good dancer to get noticed by the judges in such a large group of dancers. For this reason, some dance coaches encourage their students to wear outgoing clothes and bright things to stand out, so that the dancer will get personal attention during their audition. For any audition interviews, dancers should send their resume and headshot to the company director ahead of time.

== Circuses and amusement parks ==
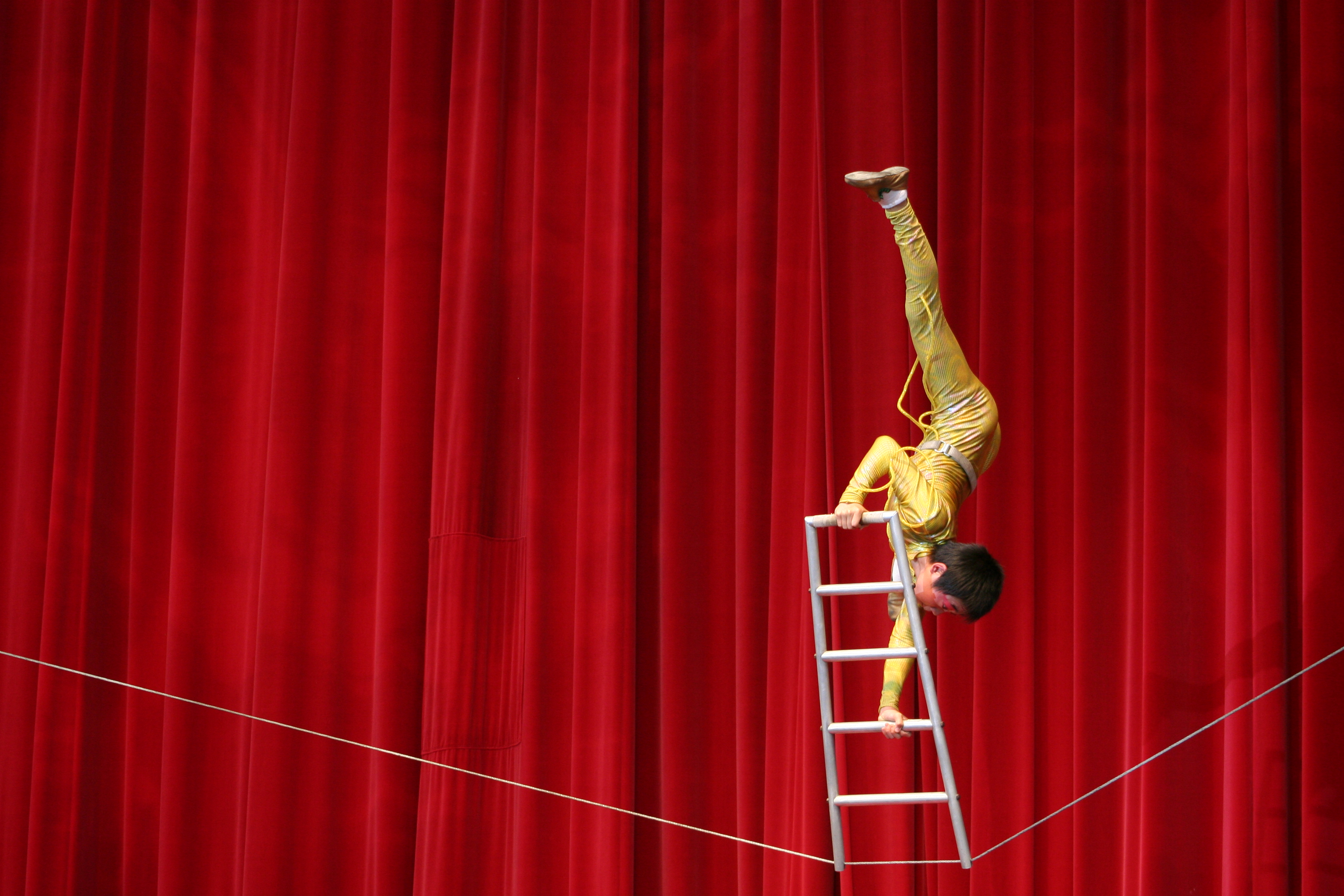
A high wire act by an acrobat

Performers auditioning for amusement parks worldwide are generally viewed by one or more casting directors in a rehearsal hall or a large facility. Most theme park auditions, like other auditions, are closed to the public. This means that no one is allowed into the audition room who is not auditioning. Vocalists for Disney auditions are asked to prepare two separate vocal selections of contrasting styles. The singers do not sing the entire songs; instead they just need to sing the best 16 bars of each song. Disney provides a piano accompanist for all vocal auditions, and so singers have to bring sheet music in the correct key. Disney does not allow any pre-recorded accompaniment. The casting directors may also ask auditionees to learn additional music or learn a movement combination. Disney Parks & Resorts casts performers for theme parks, resorts, and cruise ships.

At Cirque du Soleil, depending on a performer's discipline, the audition may last an hour, a day or even two days. Depending on a performer's discipline, he or she might have to perform a solo presentation in front of the group of participants and/or participate in individual and group exercises following the solo presentation. Auditions for Cirque du Soleil are filmed.

== Modelling ==
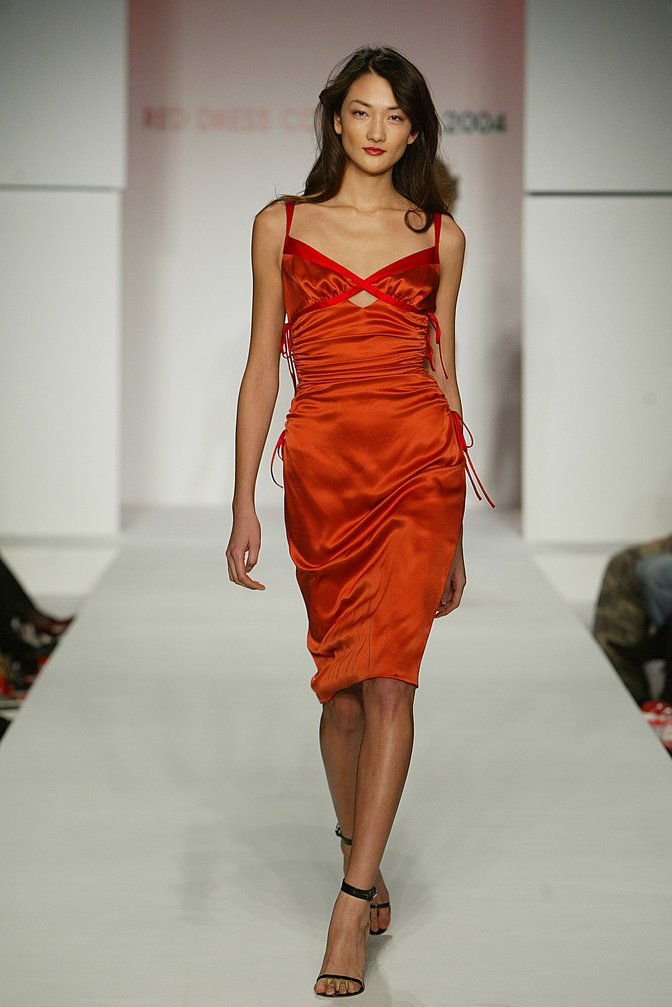
Model Ai Tominaga modeling in the 2004 Red Dress Collection for the Heart Truth campaign

Modelling agencies and other organizations that are looking for models, such as fashion designers and advertising agencies also use auditions to screen and select potential candidates. Aspiring female models for most fashion industry roles need to be in their teens or early twenties and be tall and slim. Although there are "niche markets" for non-svelte models ("plus size models" and "real life models" who model clothes for middle-market clothing catalogues), most female models need to be slender and between 108 and 125 lbs. Young men who are aspiring models should be between 18 and 25, tall, and fit. While male models who are selected at modelling auditions may well end up having careers that last till beyond age 25 (even into their 40s), modelling agencies prefer to recruit new models in the 18–25 age range. Most models work with an agent who arranges auditions, bookings, and negotiates fees. At an audition, casting agents will ask the model to demonstrate different poses, which a photographer may record with a digital camera.

For high fashion auditions, the model may be asked to demonstrate the "catwalk" style of modelling clothes on a raised runway. At most modelling auditions, models wear fairly simple clothes that will allow the talent agents to imagine the model in different garments. Typically, a model wears fairly body-hugging clothes, so that the judges can see the body type of the model. Some modelling agencies audition a large number of aspiring models in an "open call", in which agents consider applicants for under a minute or so each. Some agencies hold model searches, which is a type of beauty contest in which applicants audition for the opportunity of winning a model portfolio or a photo shoot.

== See also ==
- Casting (performing arts)
- Screen test
- Audition website
