= Stephen Burrows =

Stephen Burrows could refer to:

- Stephen Burrows (actor), an American actor, film director and screenwriter
- Stephen Burrows (designer) (born 1943), an American fashion designer
