= Wanderlust (2006 film) =

- Written by: Shari Springer Berman; Robert Pulcini
- Directed by: Shari Springer Berman; Robert Pulcini
- Country of origin: United States
- Original language: English

Production
- Producers: Julia King; Alicia Sams
- Cinematography: Terry Stacey
- Editor: Tom Donahue
- Running time: 70 minutes
- Production company: Tailslate Pictures

Original release
- Release: July 12, 2006

Wanderlust is a 2006 documentary film on road movies and their effect on American culture.

== Cast ==
In alphabetical order

- Allison Anders as Herself
- Eszter Balint archive footage as Eva (Stranger Than Paradise, 1984)
- Jeanine Basinger as Herself
- Robert Benton as Himself
- Laurie Bird archive footage as the Girl (Two-Lane Blacktop, 1971) (uncredited)
- Karen Black archive footage as Herself
- Peter Bogdanovich as Himself
- Albert Brooks archive footage as David Howard (Lost in America, 1985)
- Jeff Brouws as Himself
- William S. Burroughs archive footage as Tom the Priest (Drugstore Cowboy, 1989)
- Alfonso Cuarón as Himself
- Kat Dennings as Lila
- Matt Dillon voice also archive footage
- Richard Edson archive footage as Eddie (Stranger Than Paradise, 1984)
- Chris Eyre as Himself
- Peter Fonda archive footage
- Monte Hellman as Himself
- Arthur Hiller as Himself
- Dennis Hopper as Himself also archive footage
- Callie Khouri as Herself
- László Kovács as Himself
- David Laderman as Himself
- Adriane Lenox voice and Herself
- Barry Levinson as Himself
- Cleavon Little archive footage as Super Soul (Vanishing Point, 1971)
- John Lurie archive footage as Willie (Stranger Than Paradise, 1984)
- Garry Marshall archive footage the Desert Inn Casino Manager (Lost in America, 1985)
- Tom McCarthy as Jim
- Timothy McVeigh archive footage and Himself (uncredited)
- Erik Menendez archive footage and Himself (uncredited)
- Lyle Menendez archive footage and Himself (uncredited)
- Mira Nair as Herself
- Hal Needham as Himself
- Barry Newman archive footage as Kowalski (Vanishing Point, 1971)
- Pat Nixon archive footage and Herself
- Richard Nixon archive footage and Himself
- Warren Oates archive footage as G.T.O. (Two-Lane Blacktop, 1971) (uncredited)
- Alexander Payne as Himself
- Ronald Reagan archive footage and Himself
- Paul Reubens as Himself also archive footage
- Peter Riegert as Himself (voice)
- David O. Russell as Himself
- Walter Salles as Himself
- Richard C. Sarafian as Himself
- Paul Rudd as Calvin
- Jerry Schatzberg as Himself
- Sam Shepard as Himself
- Stephen Shore as Himself
- O. J. Simpson as Himself archive footage (uncredited)
- Gary Sinise as Himself (voice)
- Harry Dean Stanton as Himself
- James Taylor archive footage as The Driver (Two-Lane Blacktop, 1971) (uncredited)
- Lili Taylor as Herself (voice)
- James Urbaniak as Himself (voice)
- Gus Van Sant as Himself
- Wim Wenders as Himself
- Dennis Wilson archive footage as The Mechanic (Two-Lane Blacktop, 1971) (uncredited)
- Rudy Wurlitzer as Himself
- Vilmos Zsigmond as Himself
