= Thanksgiving (2004 film) =

2004 film by Tom Donahue

- Directed by: Tom Donahue
- Written by: Sean Gullette
- Starring: Yolonda Ross; William Mahoney; James Urbaniak; Seymour Cassel
- Distributed by: Flip Side Film
- Release dates: June 11, 2004 (Atlanta Film and Video Festival)
- Running time: 13 minutes
- Country: United States
- Language: English

Thanksgiving is a 2004 American short film directed by Tom Donahue and starring Yolonda Ross, William Mahoney and James Urbaniak.

== Premise ==
Yolonda (Yolonda Ross) is a young woman fleeing an unwanted commitment. She finds refuge in an isolated motel out of town, which is due for demolition in the morning, and there confronts a mysterious man named Peck (Mahoney), who is the caretaker of the old motel with a strange past.

== Cast ==
- Yolonda Ross - Yolonda
- William Mahoney - Peck
- James Urbaniak - Willy
- Seymour Cassel - Del
- Kat Foster (as Kathy Foster) - Nadine
- Jake Robards - Young Peck
