= Marion Dougherty =

American casting director

- Born: Marion Caroline Dougherty; February 9, 1923; Hollidaysburg, Pennsylvania, United States
- Died: December 4, 2011 (aged 88); Manhattan, New York City, New York, United States
- Occupation: Casting director

Marion Caroline Dougherty (February 9, 1923 – December 4, 2011) was an American casting director. She is known for casting films such as The World of Henry Orient, Midnight Cowboy, Me, Natalie, Panic in Needle Park, Grease, Urban Cowboy, The World According to Garp, and Batman.

Marion Dougherty is also the primary subject of Casting By, a 2012 documentary, combining over 230 interviews, extensive archival footage, animated stills and documents to tell her untold tale. Dedicated to her memory, Dougherty died before the film's release.

== Biography ==
Dougherty attended Penn State University, where she was a member of Kappa Alpha Theta. Dougherty's career in the performing arts began when, after graduating from Penn State in 1943, she had a brief stint working at the Cleveland Playhouse as an actress. She then moved to New York City, just as live television was becoming mainstream. She was making window displays at the Bergdorf Goodman Building when a fellow Penn State alum, who had been recently hired into the casting department at Kraft Television Theatre, hired her as an assistant.

In 1991, many prominent filmmakers and actors, including Clint Eastwood, Woody Allen and Al Pacino, attempted to convince the Academy of Motion Picture Arts and Sciences to grant an honorary award to Dougherty. Unfortunately this dream of recognizing her was never accomplished, before her death in 2011.

== Career ==
After working at the Kraft Television Theatre, Dougherty moved on to another television series, Naked City, where she gave Jon Voight and Dustin Hoffman their first acting credits. While working on this show and another, Route 66, Marion was able to feature many notable guest stars such as Tina Louise, Michael Parks, Jean Stapleton, Jessica Walter, William Shatner, Joan Crawford, Christopher Walken, Gene Hackman, Martin Sheen, and Robert Duvall.

In 1963 Dougherty established her own casting company in New York, where she began casting local talent out of the theaters. Dougherty became notable for her casting decisions, choosing to cast based on their acting abilities, as opposed to type casting based on appearance.

Out of her brownstone, Dougherty worked on many Hollywood films, including The World of Henry Orient, Hawaii, and Midnight Cowboy. In 1972 with the release of Slaughterhouse-Five, Dougherty made history as being one of the first casting directors to receive an entire title card to list their credit. From 1979 to 1999, Dougherty worked at Warner Brothers as the Vice President of casting.

Other notable actors that Dougherty gave their first film credit to include Glenn Close in The World According to Garp, Bette Midler in Hawaii, and Al Pacino in Me, Natalie.

== Filmography ==
=== Television ===
Year	Title	Credit Listing	Notes
1961-1963	Naked City	Casting Executive	68 Episodes
1963-1964	Route 66	Eastern Casting Executive	17 Episodes

=== Notable films ===
Year	Title	Credit Listing	Notes
1964	The World of Henry Orient	Casting Director	
1966	Hawaii	Casting Director	
1969	Midnight Cowboy	Casting Director	Uncredited
1969	Me, Natalie	Casting Director	
1971	Panic in Needle Park	Casting	Uncredited
1971	Willy Wonka & the Chocolate Factory	Casting Director	Rented the Plaza Hotel for titular role of Willy Wonka
1972	Slaughterhouse-Five	Casting Director	
1973	The Sting	Casting Director	
1973	The Last American Hero	Casting Director	
1975	The Day of the Locust	Casting Director	
1978	Grease	Casting: Paramount	Uncredited
1978	Pretty Baby	Casting	Uncredited
1979	Escape from Alcatraz	Casting Director	Uncredited
1980	Urban Cowboy	Casting: Los Angeles	
1982	The World According to Garp	Casting Director	
1987	Full Metal Jacket	Additional Casting	
1987	Lethal Weapon	Casting Director	
1987	The Lost Boys	Casting Director	
1988	Gorillas in the Mist	Casting Director	
1989	Batman	Casting Director	
1990	Joe Versus the Volcano	Casting	
1992	Batman Returns	Casting Director	
1993	Falling Down	Casting Director	
1995	Braveheart	Casting Director	
1997	Anna Karenina	Casting Director	
