= Bleed Out (film) =

- Film poster
- Written by: Stephen Burrows
- Directed by: Stephen Burrows
- Music by: Bobby Johnston
- Country of origin: United States
- Original language: English

Production
- Producers: Ilan Arbodela; Stephen Burrows; Tom Donahue
- Cinematography: Dan Ollman; Stephen Burrows
- Editor: Jill Schweitzer
- Running time: 89 minutes
- Production companies: HBO Documentary Films; Impact Partners; CreativeChaos vmg The Burrows of Hollywood

Original release
- Network: HBO
- Release: December 17, 2018

Bleed Out is a 2018 HBO feature documentary film that explores how an American family deals with the effects of medical malpractice. The film revolves around a ten-year journey, captured through archival footage, spy-cams, and interviews. Writer-director Steve Burrows reveals the ways his mother, Judie Burrows, was afflicted for the rest of her life due to a mistake during a partial hip surgery procedure.

Bleed Out premiered on HBO on December 17, 2018. The film was awarded as Best Feature Documentary by the Los Angeles Press Club in 2019, with judges acclaiming it "absolutely mind-blowing".

== Synopsis ==
After a complicated hip replacement surgery which led Judie Burrows to fall into a coma which resulted in permanent brain damage in 2009, her son, Steve Burrows, sets out to investigate the truth behind the medical treatment that his mother received at the hospital. The documentary film takes place over a span of ten years. Each year highlights how a family deals with the effects of medical error and Steve's efforts to figure out the truth about the American healthcare system while trying to proceed with a malpractice lawsuit against the medical centers which were in charge of his mother. Throughout the film, Steve Burrows, who is also the director of the film, includes real footage, undercover spy-cam footage, interviews, and courtroom testimonies to share his mother's story and demonstrate what he believes are the institutional flaws of the American healthcare system.

== Plot ==
Bleed Out begins by introducing Judie Burrows, the mother of the comedy director Steve Burrows, as an independent, globetrotting, retired school teacher who loved to travel. The film shifts to June 2009, where Judie is rushed to a hospital in Milwaukee, Wisconsin after suffering a hip fracture due to a fall from her bike. At the hospital, Judie undergoes a hip surgery and a rehabilitation process; afterwards, she is sent home where she endured a slow recovery despite the physical therapy. Five months after her initial hip surgery, Judie falls again, and is rushed to the hospital. She spends eight days in the hospital, calmed with painkillers, as the physicians try to understand where exactly the pain was coming from. After a week, the physicians concluded that Judie has broken her hip again and needs a rushed partial hip replacement surgery. Steve Burrows mentions that his mother, before the incident, was taking Plavix, which is a blood thinner, and states that it is usually suggested that the patient should be off the blood thinner a few days before the surgery. Nonetheless, despite being on blood thinners, Judie is cleared and undergoes her second hip surgery, where she loses about half of her body's blood volume.

Judie withstands the surgery and is taken to the hospital's intensive care unit (ICU) to recover. On her first night at the ICU, the floor that Judie's room is on has no ICU physicians; instead, Judie's room is an electronic intensive care unit (eICU), where she is monitored by a group of doctors in an airport nearby through a camera. The eICU doctors can monitor their patients with microphones, alarms, and video cameras that can focus the details found on patients' monitors. Within an hour at the ICU, Judie's blood pressure drops below 50/30, and without anyone noticing, she falls into a coma. Two days later, a neurologist comes to evaluate her after she was determined to be unresponsive the day before during post-operation checkup, and declares her to be in a coma. Judie is comatose for almost two weeks, and once she wakes up, she is diagnosed with severe cognitive and physical disabilities because of the loss of oxygen to the brain.

The film contains misinformation about the frequency and consequences of medical errors in the United States, suggesting they are the third leading cause of death. Marty Makary, a surgeon at Johns Hopkins, explains why he considers the occurrence of medical errors as a silent epidemic and why he believes they have become more frequent.

The film goes back to the family. They were able to look at the anesthesiology records during Judie's second surgery and suspected that the records were too "impeccable" since no drop in blood pressure was ever recorded even if Judie lost a large amount of blood. Judie's family is displeased with the outcome, and it motivates Steve Burrow's uncle, Dr. Ted Payne, to persuade Steve to investigate the situation further and to file a lawsuit against the hospital. Steve visits a medical malpractice attorney, Lynn Laufenberg, and receives insight on how, in Wisconsin, patients lose 90% of malpractice lawsuits. Steve is still interested in filing a lawsuit and starts recording his mother's experience to use it as evidence.

While trying to find a medical malpractice attorney to take the case, Steve simultaneously tries to manage his research about the medical errors and deal with medical bills. Judie is responsible for paying the bills since Medicare cannot cover the entirety of her long-term care at a rehabilitation center. Steve finds a medical malpractice attorney, Mike End; End describes the complications that they will face because of some laws that protect doctors in Wisconsin. For example, End explains Wisconsin statute 907.06, known as the Doctor Privilege Law, give doctors the right to not testify against other doctors. End reminds Steve that it might take three years or more for the lawsuit to get to trial.

Judie's conditions improve with time, but due to spastic paraplegia, she can only walk by using a walker. Her cognitive impairment does not improve, and a neuropsychologist declares her incompetent with the cognitive abilities of an 8-year old. Steve tries to tell his mom about her situation, but Judie denies what the doctors say about her cognitive abilities and insists on returning home. They decide that it would be best for her to stay at the rehabilitation center. Four years after the incident, Judie, being on Medicare also goes into Medicaid because her 50 years of life savings, about $200,000, were not enough for the medical bills. Steve deals with waves of complications with insurance companies, medical corporations, and medical bills.

Steve investigates his mother's surgery by meeting individuals related to the case, such as Bauer, his mother's surgeon, and a risk manager for Aurora West Allis Medical Center. He records these meetings with spy-cams. Bauer expresses his confusion about why the ICU has no physicians physically present and calls the eICU "sloppy medicine”. Eventually, Bauer recommends Steve talk to Aurora Health Care. Steve meets with the risk manager from Aurora and asks why Judie not receive any financial assistance, to which she repliesthat the hospital would have if they felt like they did something wrong.

The film transitions from the spy-cam footage to a phone call in which Steve is told that Judie was rushed to the hospital. At the hospital, Judie had a stroke, but the medical caretakers treat her for a seizure. Judie is diagnosed with permanent brain damage, is unable to speak and has a catheter strapped onto her stomach. Then the film transitions again to Makary talking about how the medical field is not learning from its mistakes.

The film jumps to 2013, where the lawsuit's depositions begin. Thirty depositions are taken, but each individual blames others for her brain damage. One deposition is from an ICU nurse named Emily who states that the cameras in these units are not on all the time to respect the patient's privacy. Another deposition is from the eICU manager, whostates that the cameras are usually off in the patients' rooms and that an eICU physician should not replace a physical ICU physician since eICU physicians tend to 160 patients per day.

After the depositions, Steve meets with Charles M. Harper Jr., a neurologist from Mayo Clinic in Rochester, Minnesota. They speak about how the field of medicine and its patients would benefit in changing their focus from financial incentives to quality, health outcomes.

The film jumps to 2016, where the lawsuit goes to trial. The court case focuses on whether there was evidence for medical negligence.

== Production ==
The production of Bleed Out started after Judie's trial. Steve Burrows used the footage he had obtained during his ten-year investigation that was meant to be a personal video diary and compiled it to make the documentary. The film included footage of various conversations and interviews between Judie, family members, attorneys, physicians, and other caregivers that had occurred during Burrows' ten-year personal investigation. The film uses footage recorded through a spy-pen that Burrows used to secretly record his conversations with caregivers related to his mother's situation.

Initially, Steve Burrows did not want to make a documentary with the footage he had gathered, which was meant to be a personal video diary. He changed his mind, and to him, the documentary was "a citizen's investigation into the state of American health care”. According to Burrows, the film had information that should be shared with everyone so they can be aware of medical malpractice.

== Reception ==
The New York Law Journal claimed, "the film is excellent, poignantly portraying the emotional torture of brain damage." Peter Keough of The Boston Globe called Bleed Out a "required viewing at a time when the future of health care looks dark indeed." According to the National Public Radio (NPR), Bleed Out takes "a deep dark dive into the heart of America's health care system." Amy Glynn from Paste stated that the film "is not a magnificent achievement," but the film shares something that people "urgently need to be aware of."

In 2019, Bleed Out was recognized by the Los Angeles Press Club and awarded the Best Feature Documentary award and won second place for the Best Medical/Health Reporting award. The judges of the Los Angeles Press Club claimed the film to be "absolutely mind-blowing."

The public was moved by the film with Steve Burrows receiving thousands of Facebook messages and "over 5,000 emotional letters of support and solidarity."

Bleed Out has had multiple screenings at locations such as the Wisconsin state capitol, universities, and organizations like Leapfrog Group. Additionally, the feature documentary was to screen meet at the Patient Safety Movement Foundation's annual conference in March 2020, where Burrows was to share the stage with the former President Bill Clinton; however, the conference was cancelled.

The film won the Southern California Journalism Award for Best Feature Documentary and was also nominated for Best Medical/Health Reporting.
