= Chump Change (film) =

- Original film poster
- Directed by: Stephen Burrows
- Written by: Stephen Burrows
- Produced by: Kirsten Caufield; Chris Connolly; Todd Hagopian; Ray Kimsey
- Starring: Stephen Burrows; Tim Matheson; Traci Lords; Jerry Stiller
- Cinematography: Allen Baker
- Edited by: Kevin J. Matusow; Pepper Welch
- Music by: Matt Cartsonis
- Distributed by: Miramax Films
- Release dates: March 30, 2000 (Wisconsin Film Festival); January 20, 2004 (United States)
- Running time: 89 minutes
- Country: United States
- Language: English

Chump Change is a 2000 comedy film, written and directed by and starring Stephen Burrows. The film is based on Burrows' experiences as a screen writer.

== Cast ==
- Stephen Burrows as Steve "Milwaukee Steve"
- Tim Matheson as Simon "Sez" Simone
- Traci Lords as Sam
- Jerry Stiller as The Colonel
- Anne Meara as Casting Director
- Abe Vigoda as "The Frog"
- Clancy Brown as The Man
- Mary Scheer as Agent #2

== Release and home media ==
The film was released by Miramax and premiered at the Wisconsin Film Festival in March 2000. The film would continue to be shown on the festival circuit in the early 2000s, including at the Slamdance Film Festival in January 2001 and the Milwaukee International Film Festival in November 2003. It was released on DVD on January 20, 2004, by Disney's Buena Vista Home Entertainment. Paramount Home Entertainment reissued the film on DVD on September 13, 2022.

== Reception ==
Todd McCarthy of Variety stated in November 2000, "Slapdash recounting of a haphazard career yields a fair share of yucks, and the hero's unexpected romance while visiting his native Wisconsin proves surprisingly engaging. But small-time, let's-put-on-a-movie feel of the project will limit exposure to regional fests and video, even if most people who actually see it will probably like it."
