= Los Tigres del Norte at Folsom Prison =

2019 documentary film

- Film poster
- Directed by: Tom Donahue
- Starring: Los Tigres del Norte
- Edited by: Karim López
- Production company: Creative Chaos Ventures
- Distributed by: Netflix
- Release date: September 15, 2019
- Running time: 64 minutes
- Country: United States
- Language: Spanish

Los Tigres del Norte at Folsom Prison is a 2019 documentary directed by Tom Donahue and starring Los Tigres del Norte. The premise revolves around Los Tigres del Norte performing at Folsom State Prison in California, USA fifty years after Johnny Cash held his historic concert there. The film was released on September 15, 2019, on Netflix.
