= Casting (performing arts) =

Selection of actors or performers for a role

In the performing arts industry such as theatre, film, or television, casting, or a casting call, is a pre-production process for selecting a certain type of actor, dancer, singer, or extra to land the role of a character in a script, screenplay, or teleplay. This process may be used for a motion picture, television program, documentary film, music video, play, or advertisement intended for an audience.

== Cast types or roles ==
Actors are selected to play various types of roles. A main cast comprises several actors whose appearances are significant in film, theatre, or television. Their roles are often called starring roles. Within a main cast, there is often a male or female lead who plays the largest role, that of the protagonist in a production. When there is no singular lead, the main roles are referred to collectively as an ensemble cast, which comprises several principal actors and performers who are typically assigned roughly equal screen time. A supporting actor is one with a role that is important to a play or film, but less so than that of the leading actors. A supporting role is more important than a bit part, which involves direct interaction with the principal actors but no more than five lines of dialogue, often referred to as a "five-or-less" or "under-five" in the United States, or "under-sixes" in British television. When a well-known actor or other celebrity appears in a bit part, it is sometimes called a cameo appearance.

== Casting process ==
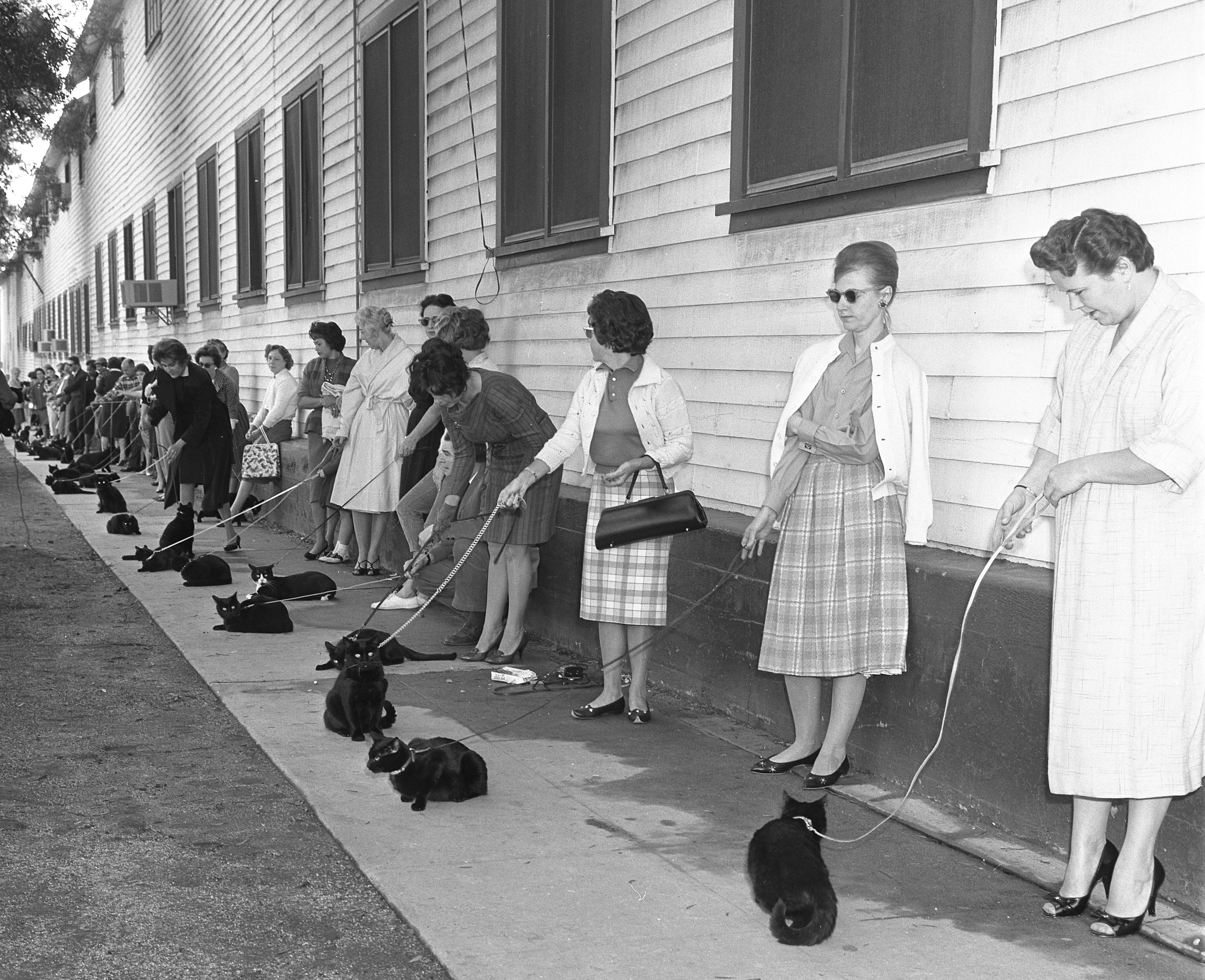
Casting call for black cats, Los Angeles, 1961; seeking cats for Tales of Terror

The casting process involves a series of auditions before a casting panel, composed of individuals within a production. Usually, in nearly all areas of show business, a casting director is on this panel, and depending on the type of production it may include a theatrical producer and theater director, a television producer, a film producer and film director, or choreographer. In the early stages of this process performers often may present or are presented with prepared audition pieces such as monologues, songs, choreography, scripts or sides.

These audition pieces are usually videotaped, typically in the form of screen tests and then attached with resumes and head shots, then shared with producers, directors, or studio executives. Later stages may involve groups of actors—both union (SAG-AFTRA) and non-union, depending on the size and scope of the production—attempting to read material from the work under consideration, paired up with other actors. With each actor's overall motivational choices evaluated, the casting panel considers both the individual actors and the chemistry created from combinations of them participating in a read-through.

Casting calls may go out into the general public at large, sometimes referred to as a "cattle call" (a U.S. term), or open audition, in which hundreds or even thousands of performers compete for a number of roles.

Casting character breakdowns, not to be confused with script breakdowns, are often provided by production agents who submit their clients to casting, which provides a brief summary of character (age, gender, race or ethnicity, situations they may be involved in).

Well-known actors or actresses have an advantage when it comes to landing roles. An actor may go through several casting calls before receiving a part, and even though well-known actors or actresses often still go through this very necessary process, some are privileged enough to have well-known writers, screenwriters, directors or producers pitch a project for their intent to be cast in a role. By the time some casting directors finish reading a script they may already have ideas about which actors might be right for the roles.

== Casting director ==
For major productions, the process of selecting actors for sometimes hundreds of speaking parts and roles often requires specialized staff. While the final decision remains with those in charge – such as the director, producer, artistic departments, and the overall production team – a casting director (or CD) is responsible for most of the day-to-day work involved in this process during pre-production. A casting director is often assisted by a casting associate; productions with large numbers of extras may also employ an extras casting director. In the production budget, casting personnel are considered part of the above-the-line staff and typically answer to the director.

Most films use either a casting agency or a casting director to find actors to match roles in the film, apart from the lead actors, who are often chosen directly by directors and producers. The job of a casting director is to know a wide range of actors so they can advise and present the best available talent to the director. Casting directors are highly influential and are usually engaged because the director trusts their judgement; they often control which actors the director actually sees.

Casting companies are independent organisations that liaise between performers and directors or producers. They maintain detailed knowledge of actors on their books and are responsible for proposing suitable candidates to match roles described by producers and directors. The company compiles lists and conducts interviews; selected candidates then attend auditions. If a producer selects one or more actors, the casting professionals negotiate contracts and fees. Casting professionals must assess many performers and reduce a large pool to a manageable shortlist for producers' consideration. They may also represent actors, but not necessarily.

The role of the casting director may include the following:

- Maintaining a list of actors (including availability details, headshots and videos) and getting to know them
- Meeting the film's director and, where possible, the writers
- Understanding the story and characters, including reading the script
- Keeping within the production budget
- Running auditions
- Recommending actors
- Assisting with negotiation of contracts (often handled by the actor's agent)
- Helping actors understand their characters

The casting director acts as a liaison between the director, actors and their agents/managers, and the studio or network to ensure that the characters in the script are cast appropriately. Some casting directors, including Marion Dougherty, Mary Jo Slater, Mary Selway, Lynn Stalmaster, April Webster, Robert J. Ulrich, Tammara Billik, Marci Liroff, Avy Kaufman, Mindy Marin, Robi Reed, and Allison Jones, have become notable for their work on numerous Hollywood productions, .

Casting directors look for various qualities when deciding which actors suit particular roles. Allison Jones has said she looks for charming people – performers whom an audience will care about. They also seek actors who can withstand the pressures of the job, including long hours and frequent improvisation during demanding shooting schedules.

In the early stages of casting and extras casting, the process may be decentralised geographically, often aligning with shooting locations or tapping into local markets for an international co-production. For top roles whose attachment has major commercial importance, casting may follow personal channels, such as direct contact with the director. During the "attachment phase" of a film, a casting director sends copies of the script to agents for what is known as "coverage" — a one-page summary of the script with brief character descriptions. If an agency agrees to give coverage, it will submit a list of suggested actors who are available, suitable and within the film's price range. Casting directors also create their own idea lists and can "check avails" by contacting actor representatives to confirm availability and interest. If an idea from a casting director or agent is approved by the director, producers and financiers (or studio), the casting director sends an "offer" — a letter to the actor's representative explaining the role, providing a copy of the script, outlining the time commitment, approximate start date, filming location and proposed salary. If the actor declines, they respond with a "pass." If they accept, a deal memo is sent and negotiations between the agency and production finalise deal points before entertainment lawyers draw up the formal contracts. When a commitment is made early in development and specific shoot dates are not yet known, a Letter of Intent (LOI) may be drafted to indicate that the actor will be hired for the role if the project is green-lit.

After the attachment phase, physical auditions begin for remaining roles. Depending on the film's budget, there may be "pre-reads" where an actor auditions only for a casting director (or associate). Successful candidates are then called back for a "callback" or a director/producer session, where they audition for the casting director, director and other decision-makers. In television, this phase is often called a "screen test" and network executives may attend. Once actors are selected, the same booking process used in the attachment phase applies; extras casting follows a separate procedure.

The resulting list of actors selected to portray characters in a production is called a cast list, which is incorporated into a production company's daily call sheet and is reflected in the project's title sequence for film and television.

=== Casting director workshops ===
Many casting directors and casting associates in the United States run casting director workshops. Practices vary, but typically aspiring actors pay to perform in front of a casting professional who provides feedback. Critics argue that casting directors are paid to find talent, not to be paid to see talent; supporters say workshops provide classroom-like feedback and networking opportunities.

Because of their mixed reception, casting director workshops have sometimes been controversial. Former Criminal Minds casting director Scott David was dismissed after The Hollywood Reporter published a story about his pay-to-play workshops. In February 2017, five casting director workshops were charged with criminal offences for charging actors to audition for projects. In January 2018, casting director Lindsay Chag – known for films such as Robin Hood: Men in Tights and Dracula: Dead and Loving It — was convicted of violating the Talent Scam Prevention Act for her role in casting director workshops.

== Casting office personnel ==
Readers: This person reads all other character's lines opposite the actor who is currently auditioning. For their audition sessions, casting offices will either bring in trusted actors as readers or will have one of the casting staff read with the actors. A reader will know how to give and take and play with other actors without ever outshining the auditioning actors.

Interns: Interns are more common to commercial casting offices, which host as many as a dozen different casting directors holding different auditions per day. While some commercial casting offices hold permanent casting space, many rent out studios on a project to project basis. A key intern will work with many busy casting directors sorting mail, copying sides and transcribing them onto "cue cards" or large boards to be read off of as prompts in the casting room, help actors sign in, and keep the flow of actors going in and out of the casting room as smooth as possible.

Casting Assistants: This is the entry-level position in the field of casting, but they act as much more than a typical office assistant. They cover the office phones, handle copying and filing, and set up audition (aka "session") equipment like lights, the camera, sound equipment, etc. They often assist in relaying audition appointments, checking actor avails, or in the casting room making sure the recording software is running smoothly so the Casting Director can focus on each actor's performance.

Casting Associates: Associate is the second chain of command in a casting office. After a casting associate has worked for two years in the field of casting, they can apply for membership in Casting Society of America. Typically, they work under a Casting Director running pre-read sessions, prepping deal memos, cutting audition sides, and making calls to talent agents. Many associates begin to take on smaller scale projects so they can amass enough credits to move up in rank to a full-fledged Casting Director.

== Race and gender in casting ==
Equity in representation has been of much discussion in Hollywood for many years. Productions do not always have a certain race or gender in mind for their starring role, but reports show disproportionate underrepresentation for women, people of color, people with disabilities, and LGBTQ+ actors in most media. UCLA's Hollywood Diversity Report and the Geena Davis Institute publish frequent and extensive research on the portrayal of diverse populations.

== Recognition for casting ==
=== Canada ===
The national Canadian Screen Awards has presented an annual award for Best Casting in a Television Series since 2006. A new award for Best Casting in a Film is slated to be introduced in 2021.

The Prix Iris, the regional Canadian film awards for Quebec, introduced the Prix Iris for Best Casting in 2017.

=== United Kingdom ===
In 2020, the British Academy Film Awards introduced the BAFTA Award for Best Casting.

=== United States ===
The highest honor a casting director can receive in the United States is the Primetime Emmy Award for Outstanding Casting. As of 2024, Junie Lowry-Johnson has won the most casting Emmys as an individual, all in the drama category. She has six awards for her work on NYPD Blue, Six Feet Under, True Blood and Homeland. The only shows to win casting Emmys three times were 30 Rock and Veep, both in the comedy category. In 2017, at the 69th Primetime Creative Arts Emmy Awards, the Academy of Television Arts & Sciences introduced the Primetime Emmy Award for Outstanding Casting for a Reality Program.

The Casting Society of America members award their peers with the Artios Award, typically held mid-January annually with ceremonies in New York, Los Angeles, and (beginning in 2018) London. Artios comes from the Greek word meaning "perfectly fitted". The Artios Awards recognize excellence in casting for all genres of casting except commercials. At their incarnation in 1985, they were held in November but were moved in the 2013–2014 season to align with the rest of the film and television industry's awards season. The Artios is awarded to those CSA members who receive primary screen (or program) credit for casting on the winning project. Location casting directors, casting executives and department heads who are CSA members and who receive credit on winning projects also receive an Artios Award. CSA Associates on those projects are recognized in the press and with a certificate.

== National organizations ==
=== Casting Society of America (CSA) ===
The primary organization of professional screen, television, reality, and theater casting in the US is the Casting Society of America (CSA), but membership is optional. Casting directors organized in 2005 and became members of a collective bargaining unit, the Hollywood Teamsters Local 399 and New York Teamsters Local 817.

== See also ==
- Audition website
- Backstage (a casting publication)
- Casting By
- Casting couch
- Character actor
- Dramatis personae
- Ensemble cast
- Extra (actor)
- Fach, the German opera casting system
- Stock character
- Stunt casting
- Stunt coordinator
- Theatre and disability
