= Audition website =

An audition website, also known as digital casting, aggregates acting, modeling, and dancing auditions online. One of the most significant organizations for professional screen and theater casting in the United States is the Casting Society of America (CSA).

Traditionally, only talent agents could schedule auditions for actors, models, dancers, and other performers. However, with the advent of audition websites, the availability of public and private auditions has increased.

Audition websites have become an integral part of employment opportunities for actors and other entertainment industry professionals.

Some audition websites require membership, while others are free to use. Most auditions require members to regularly browse through audition listings, sign up for, or even self-tape and submit their auditions through the website.

Aside from a membership fee, audition websites typically don't charge anything for their use, and unlike talent agents, they don't take a percentage of the income earned from jobs booked through their service. This has led to a rise in popularity for these services, with some now having millions of members.

== See also ==
- Casting (performing arts)
