= Stephen Burrows (actor) =

American actor

Stephen Burrows is a writer-director-actor. His films include Bleed Out, Chump Change and Spy Hard.

In 2009 a routine operation left Burrows' mother in a coma with permanent brain damage. His personal video diary over the course of almost ten years evolved into the 2018 HBO documentary Bleed Out as "a citizen’s investigation into the state of American health care", particularly medical malpractice, ruinous medical bills, and nearly useless insurance coverage.

== Filmography ==
=== Actor ===
- The Soldier of Fortune (1991) as The Soldier
- America's Funniest Home Videos (1992–1996) as Elvis, as Shriner, as Abe Lincoln etc.
- Seinfeld (1993) guest-starring as David
- My Father the Hero (1994) as Hakim
- Bobby's World (1994) as Ukulele Man
- The Second Half (1994) as UPS Man
- Bucket of Blood (1995) as Carpenter
- The George Wendt Show (1995) as Karaoke M.C.
- Alien Avengers (1996) as Detective Watts
- Spy Hard (1996) as Agent Burrows
- Chump Change (2004) as Milwaukee Steve
- The King Kaiser Show (2008) as King Kaiser
- The Big Jump (2008) as Harry Hope
- This Changes Everything (2018) as G-Man
- Bleed Out (2018)

=== Art department ===
- Little White Lies (1989)
- Face of Love (film) (1990)
- Stop at Nothing (1991)

=== Director ===
- The Soldier of Fortune (1991)
- Chump Change (2004)
- The King Kaiser Show (2007)
- The Big Jump (2008)
- Bleed Out (2018)

=== Editor ===
- The Soldier of Fortune (1991)
- Chump Change (2004)

=== Writer ===
- The Soldier of Fortune (1991)
- Chump Change (2004)
- The King Kaiser Show (2007)
- The Big Jump (2008)
- Bleed Out (2018)

=== Producer ===
- The Soldier of Fortune (1991)
- Chump Change (2004)
- The King Kaiser Show (2007)
- The Big Jump (2008)
- Bleed Out (2018)

=== Cinematographer ===
- Bleed Out (2018)

=== Other ===
- "America's Funniest Home Videos" (1990) (video screener)
