= This Changes Everything (2018 film) =

2018 American documentary film

- Film poster
- Directed by: Tom Donahue
- Produced by: Ilan Arboleda; Tom Donahue; Kerianne Flynn
- Cinematography: Stefano Ferrari
- Edited by: Jasmin Way
- Music by: Leigh Roberts and Allison Piccioni
- Release date: 9 September 2018 (TIFF)
- Running time: 97 minutes
- Country: United States
- Language: English

This Changes Everything is a 2018 American documentary film, directed by Tom Donahue. An examination of sexism in the Hollywood film industry, the film interviews a variety of actresses and women filmmakers on their experiences in the industry.

Featured in the movie is "film director Maria Giese, who was a key instigator of the ACLU and federal investigations, has been a feminist activist in Hollywood since 2014, when she wrote an explosive article for Ms. magazine in which she observed that entertainment is the worst offender of Title VII employment anti-discrimination laws of any U.S. industry. She casts a somewhat jaundiced eye on enterprises like Time's Up, which was created within the Hollywood establishment to address workplace sexual harassment and assault, observing that it's one of several collegial, inside-industry efforts undertaken to avoid legal action and government oversight. Those threats have served as a sort of twin sword of Damocles, forcing studios, networks and agencies to do the right thing after decades of denying there was a problem".

== Release ==
The film premiered at the 2018 Toronto International Film Festival. The film received multiple standing ovations and was only the second documentary to be shown in Toronto's iconic 2600-seat Roy Thomson Hall. The film was created in association with Geena Davis Institute on Gender in Media, Artemis Rising Foundation, David Yurman and Lyft Entertainment. The film explores the issues surrounding gender inequality in Hollywood and has since screened in over 20 film festivals in North America and Europe. It stars Reese Witherspoon, Mira Nair, and Shonda Rhimes.

On January 17, 2019, Deadline Hollywood announced that the film's theatrical, streaming, and broadcast rights for North America had been acquired by Good Deed Entertainment, and that the film would be released theatrically in the first half of 2019. The film had its premiere on 700+ screens via Fathom Releasing on July 22, 2019, followed by a limited theatrical release on August 9, 2019.

The film had its cable premiere on Starz on December 16, 2019.

== Reception ==
In her review for The New York Times, Aisha Harris called the film "passionate... a crucial Cri de Coeur" and Ashley Lee from The Washington Post called it "searing".

Pete Hammond from Deadline called the film "powerful and fascinating". He writes, "Some might believe that this movie especially, considering the subject matter, should be helmed by a woman. Donahue, however, is the one who got it made and feels correctly that it is as much if not more important to open the eyes of men in this regard."

In his Variety review, Peter Debruge writes, "There's something to be said for solidarity shown by those who have nothing to gain from their support beyond the advancement of the greater good. So, like white people at a Black Lives Matter rally or straight folks at a Gay Pride parade, Donahue deserves credit for proactively going out of his way to make a movie that tells it like it is — and paints it as it could be."

== Accolades ==
This Changes Everything was named first runner-up for the Toronto International Film Festival People's Choice Award: Documentaries. It also won the Greg Gund Memorial Standing Up Competition at the Cleveland International Film Festival in April 2019.

On October 27, 2019, the Academy of Motion Pictures Arts and Sciences awarded Geena Davis with the Jean Hersholt Humanitarian Award for her work profiled in This Changes Everything. Lina Wertmuller (who is mentioned in the documentary as the film director that inspired Maria Giese to become a filmmaker) was also honored with a Life Achievement Award.

In January 2020, This Changes Everything won a Philanthropy Women's Leadership Award.
