= Jeanine Basinger =

American film historian at Wesleyan University (born 1936)

- Born: February 3, 1936 (age 90); Ravenden, Arkansas, U.S.
- Occupations: Film historian, university professor
- Years active: 1969–2020
- Known for: Film Studies Department at Wesleyan University (1969)

Jeanine Basinger (born February 3, 1936, Ravenden, Arkansas) is an American film historian who was the Corwin-Fuller professor of film studies at Wesleyan University and the founder and curator of the university's cinematic archives.

== Early life and education ==
Jeanine Basinger was raised in Brookings, South Dakota. She first became interested in film at the age of 11 when she worked as an usher at The College Theater. She said that seeing the same film over and over gave her an understanding of "the way films... [affect] the audience, ... where they work and where they don't." She attended and received her BS and MS from South Dakota State University.

== Career ==
Basinger first arrived in Middletown, Connecticut, where Wesleyan University is located, in 1960 as marketing director of American Education Publications, then owned by the university and later sold to Xerox. In the late 1960s, Professors John Frazer and Joseph W. Reed recruited her into the new film department they had created. This soon evolved into her teaching a class at Wesleyan on her own, beginning in 1969, despite lacking the usual academic credentials. Basinger, with Reed's help eventually received the title of Professor of Film Studies, and later an endowed chair as Corwin-Fuller Professor of Film Studies.

In 1970, she and then-student Laurence Mark established a student-run film series that eventually became the country's longest-lasting such series. She was a pioneer of taking Hollywood film seriously as a subject of academic study, teaching the work of Clint Eastwood as early as 1971. Because of Basinger, Wesleyan increasingly became seen as a place for Hollywood figures to deposit their archives; among those who have done so are Elia Kazan, Frank Capra, and eventually the aforementioned Clint Eastwood.

Under her leadership, by 1990 film had become a standalone program and major at Wesleyan separate from the art department, cross-listing courses with the art department and other established departments. It evolved into a formal department in 2000, with its own faculty and with Basinger as chair, a role she relinquished in 2016 before retiring in 2020, by which time that department had evolved into the College of Film and the Moving Image.

Basinger is also a trustee emeritus of the American Film Institute, a member of the Steering Committee of the National Center for Film and Video Preservation, and one of the Board of Advisors for the Association of Independent Video and Filmmakers. On February 11, 2005, she was named to the board of directors of the National Board of Review of Motion Pictures. She is an advisor to Martin Scorsese's film foundation, produced an American Masters special on Clint Eastwood, and was head consultant and producer of PBS's American Cinema: 100 Years of Filmmaking, as well as author of its companion volume.

== Legacy ==
Basinger has been described as "one of the most important film scholars alive today." She has been said to have built Wesleyan's Film Studies program into one of the ten best film schools in the world. Graduates include Akiva Goldsman, Joss Whedon, Michael Bay, Paul Weitz, Laurence Mark, Paul Schiff, Gary Walkow, Alex Kurtzman, Bruce Eric Kaplan, Toby Emmerich, Nick Meyer, Marc Shmuger, Rick Nicita, Bradley Fuller, Dana Delany, Stephen Schiff, Rodger Grossman, Toni Ross, Bradley Whitford, Sam Wasson, Domenica Cameron-Scorsese, Liz Garcia, Jon Turteltaub, Owen Renfroe, Jeffrey Lane, Ed Decter, Zak Penn, Jeremy Arnold and Miguel Arteta.

She has appeared in numerous documentaries and in a dramatic role in A Better Way to Die (2000). In 2006 she participated in Wanderlust, a documentary film on road movies and their effect on American culture.

== Awards ==
- 1996 Wesleyan Binswanger Prize for Excellence in Teaching
- 1999 National Board of Review's William K. Everson Prize for Film History for Silent Stars
- 2005 Governor's Arts and Tourism Award from the Connecticut Commission on Culture and Tourism
- Honorary Doctorate of Humane Letters from the American Film Institute on June 7, 2006
- 2008 Theatre Library Association Award for The Star Machine
- 2013 Wesleyan Binswanger Prize for Excellence in Teaching
- 2024 Robert Osborne Award

== Works ==
=== Books ===
- The World War II Combat Film: Anatomy of a Genre (1985, 2003)
- Anthony Mann: A Critical Study
- The It's a Wonderful Life Book
- Shirley Temple (1975)
- Lana Turner (1976)
- Gene Kelly (1976)
- A Woman's View: How Hollywood Spoke to Women 1930-1960 (1993)
- American Cinema: 100 Years of Filmmaking (companion book for a PBS series).
- Silent Stars (1999)
- The Star Machine, Alfred A. Knopf (2007) (ISBN 978-1-4000-4130-5). About the height of the studio system in the Golden Age from the 1930s to the 1950s.
- I Do and I Don't: A History of Marriage in the Movies (2013)
- The Movie Musical! (2019)

=== Audio commentaries ===
- The Ghost and Mrs. Muir, with film historian Kenneth Geist
- Gigi, with actress Leslie Caron
- In This Our Life
- It (1927 film)
- It's a Wonderful Life (Criterion laserdisc)
- Jezebel
- Laura, with composer David Raksin
- The Philadelphia Story
- Pearl Harbor, with director Michael Bay
- Sergeant York
- The Tall T
- Three Coins in the Fountain
- Week-End in Havana
- The Wild One
