= David Martin (journalist) =

American television news correspondent (born 1943)

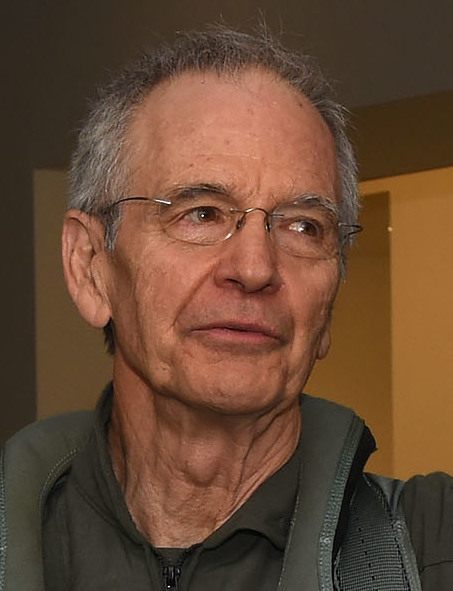
- Martin in 2019
- Born: July 28, 1943 (age 83); Washington, D.C., U.S.
- Education: Yale University
- Occupation: Correspondent
- Title: CBS News National Security Correspondent
- Spouse: Elinor Martin
- Children: 4
- Website: www.cbsnews.com/team/david-martin/

David C. Martin (born July 28, 1943) is an American television news correspondent, journalist and author who works for CBS News. He has been the network's National Security Correspondent reporting from The Pentagon since 1993. Martin has contributed reports to the CBS Evening News, CBS Sunday Morning, 60 Minutes, and 48 Hours.

== Early life and career ==
Martin was born July 28, 1943, in Washington, D.C. He graduated from Yale University in 1965 with a degree in English. He served during the Vietnam War as a naval officer. Martin began at CBS News as a researcher in 1969. His career during the 1970s and early 1980s included stints at Newsweek Magazine and the Associated Press. He became CBS News Pentagon correspondent in 1983. Martin received a 1990 News and Documentary Emmy Award in the category "Outstanding General Coverage of a Single Breaking News Story (Programs)" for his contributions to 48 Hours: Hurricane Watch covering Hurricane Hugo. On June 28, 2024 he was recognized by Defense Secretary Lloyd Austin at the Pentagon for his 40 years of reporting.

== Works ==
- Martin, David C. (2003). Wilderness of Mirrors: Intrigue, Deception and the Secrets That Destroyed Two of the Cold War's Most Important Agents. Guilford, Connecticut: Globe Pequot Press. ISBN 978-1-58574-824-2.
- Martin, David C.; Walcott John (1988). Best Laid Plans: The Inside Story of America's War Against Terrorism. New York: HarperCollins. ISBN 9780060158774
