= 2024 Los Angeles Film Critics Association Awards =

American film awards

50th LAFCA Awards
- Date: December 8, 2024

Highlights
- Best Picture: Anora

The 50th Los Angeles Film Critics Association Awards, presented by the Los Angeles Film Critics Association (LAFCA), honoured the best in film for 2024. Winners were announced on December 8, 2024. Anora received the most awards with three wins: Best Film, Best Lead Performance (Mikey Madison), and Best Supporting Performance (Yura Borisov). Marianne Jean-Baptiste (for Hard Truths) became the first Black woman in LAFCA's history to win in the lead performance category (or when they were awarding it under the name Best Actress).

Originally scheduled to be held on January 11, 2025, the association's annual banquet where the winners are honored in the Biltmore Hotel, was canceled due to the series of wildfires in Southern California.

== Winners ==
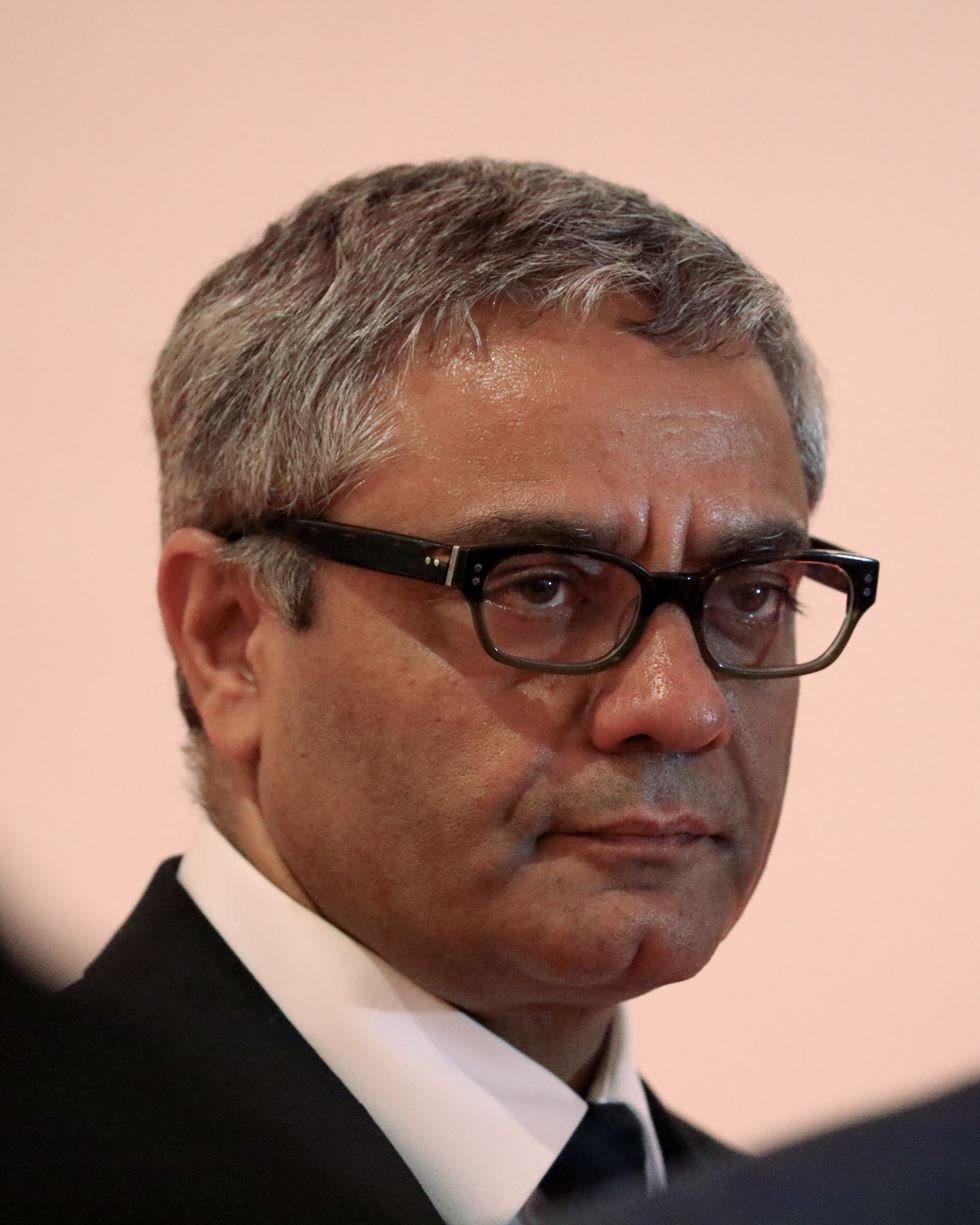
Mohammad Rasoulof, Best Director winner

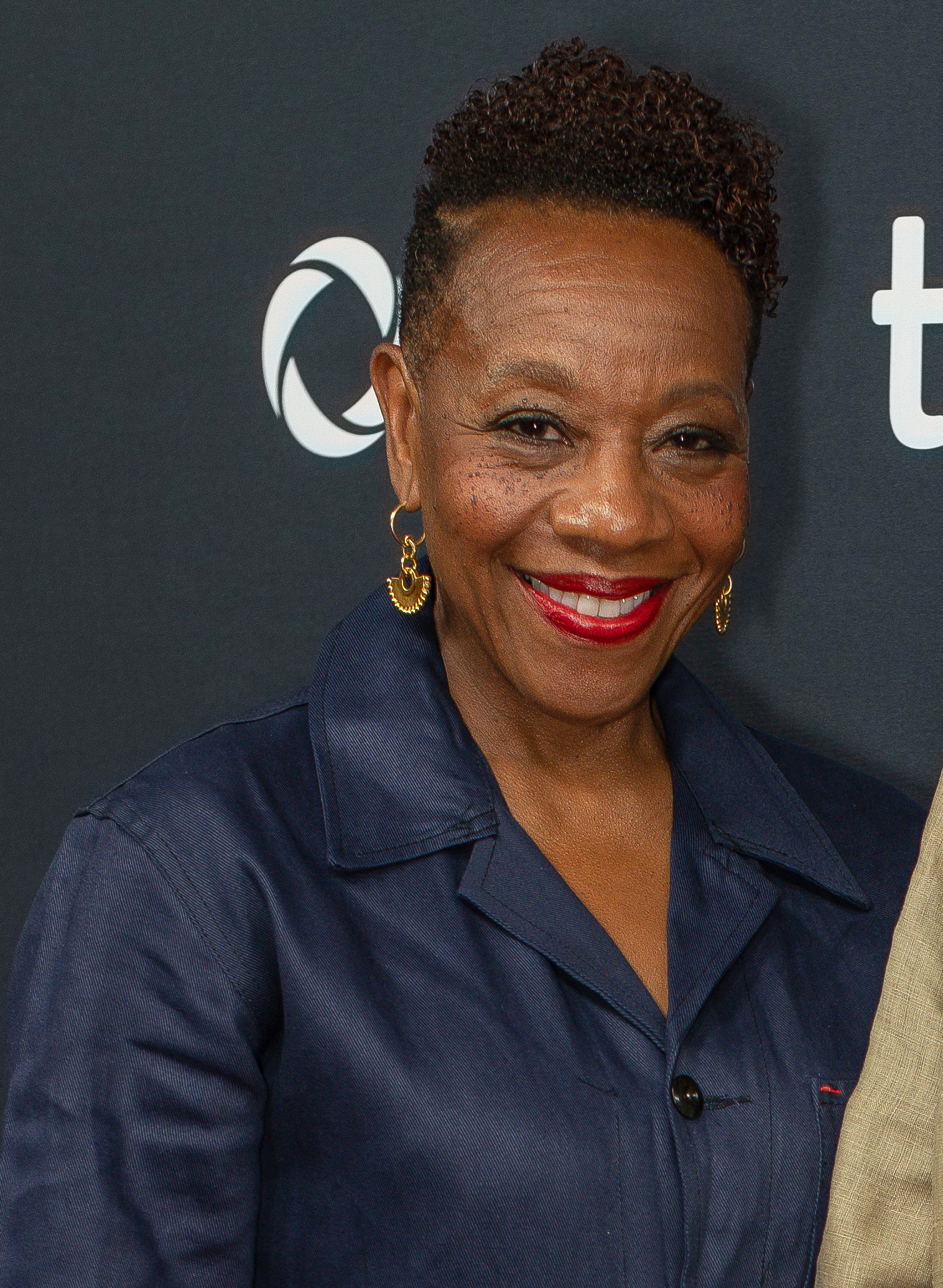
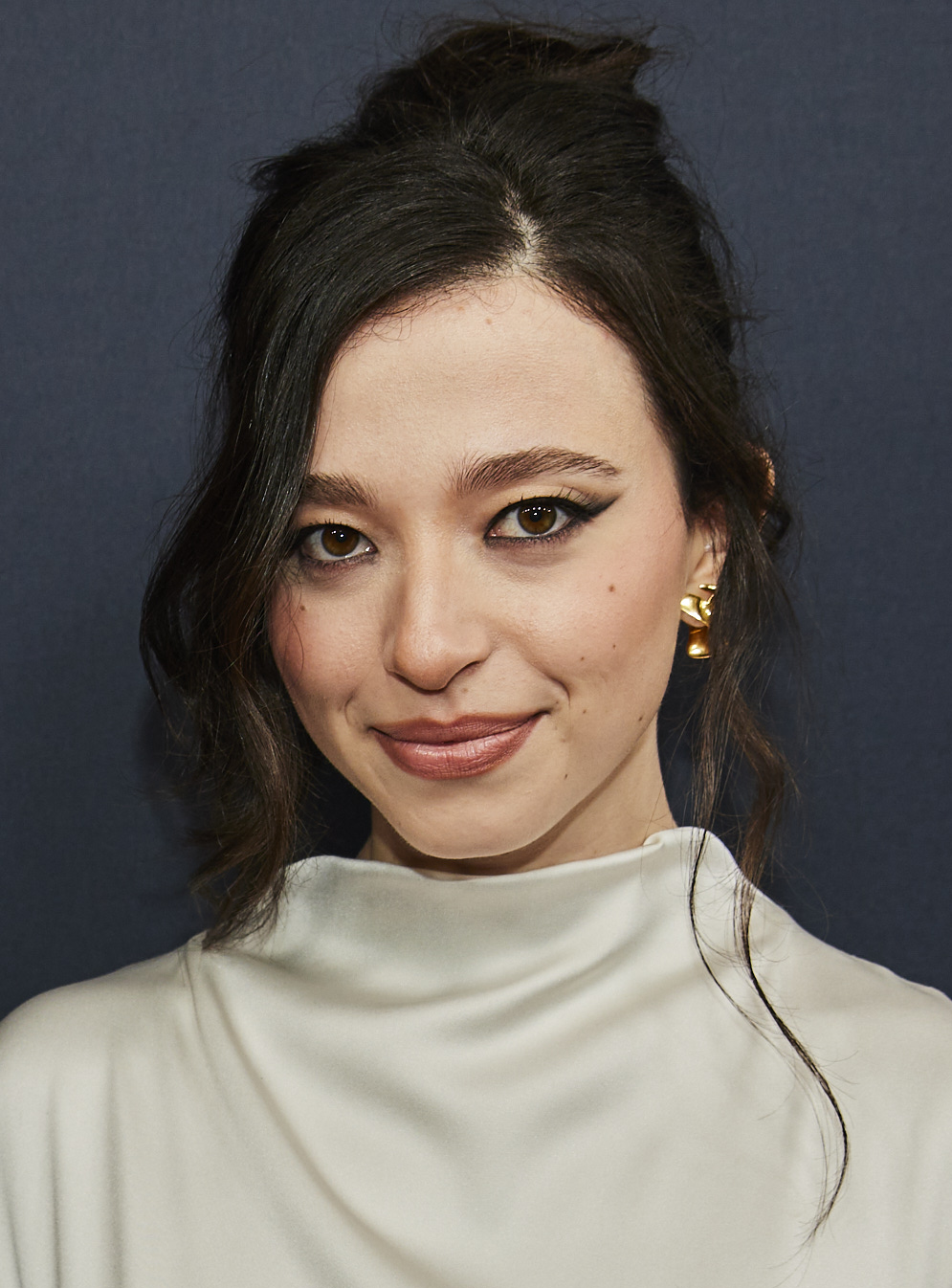
Marianne Jean-Baptiste and Mikey Madison, Best Lead Performance winners
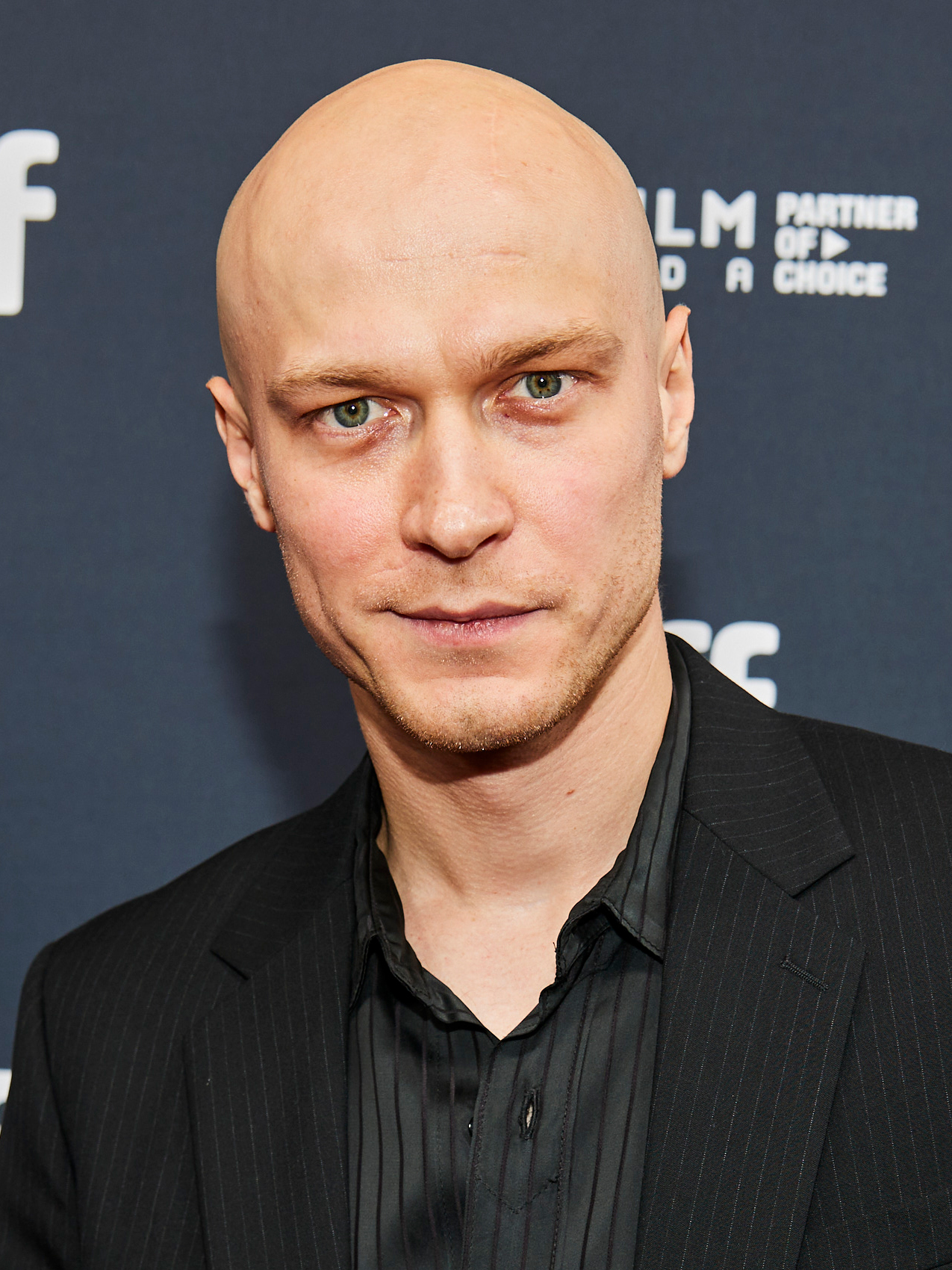
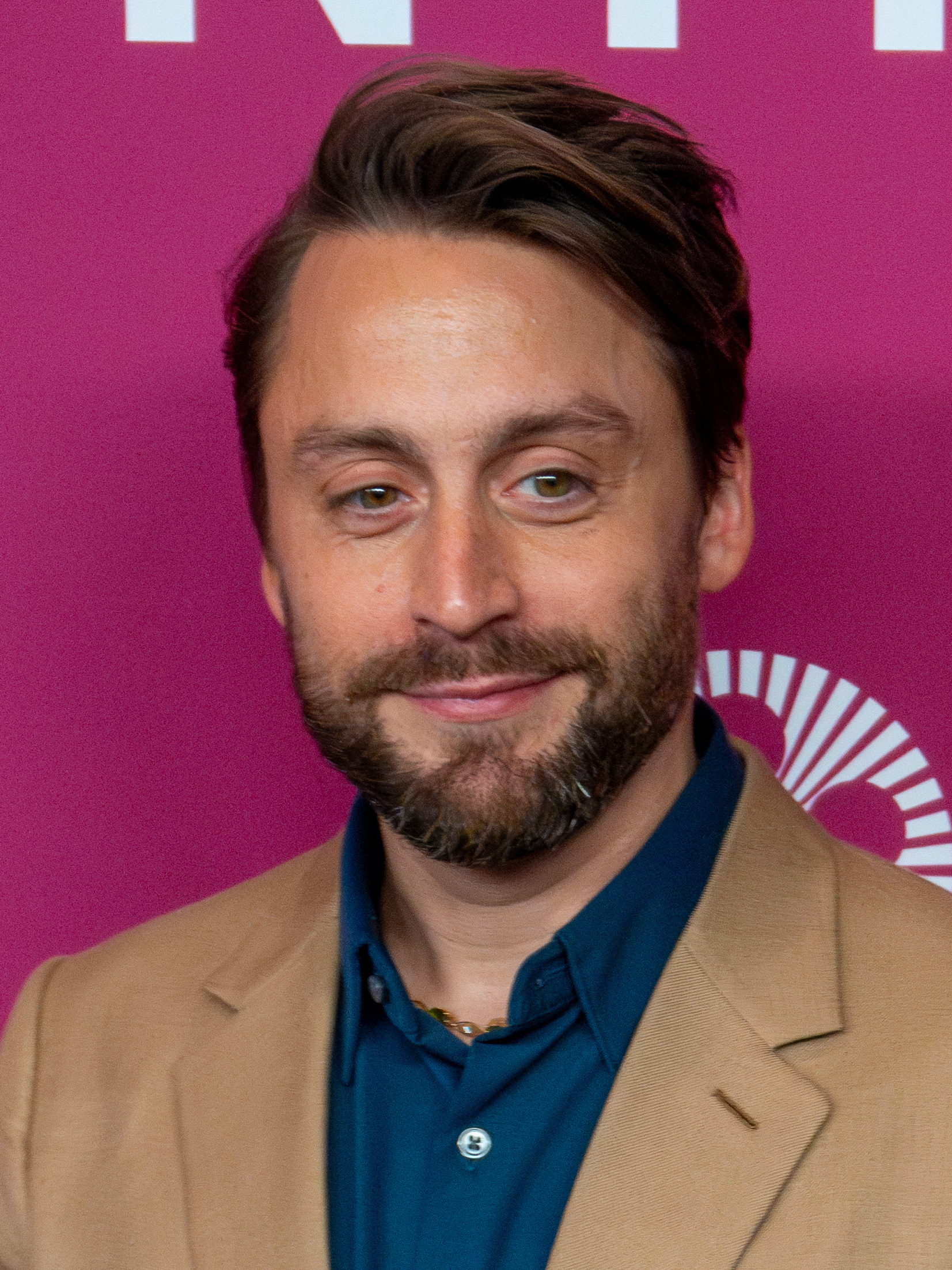
Yura Borisov and Kieran Culkin, Best Supporting Performance winners
- Best Film:
  - Anora
    - Runner-up: The Brutalist
- Best Director:
  - Mohammad Rasoulof – The Seed of the Sacred Fig
    - Runner-up: Sean Baker – Anora
- Best Lead Performance:
  - Marianne Jean-Baptiste – Hard Truths
  - Mikey Madison – Anora
    - Runner-up: Demi Moore – The Substance
    - Runner-up: Fernanda Torres – I'm Still Here
- Best Supporting Performance:
  - Yura Borisov – Anora
  - Kieran Culkin – A Real Pain
    - Runner-up: Clarence Maclin – Sing Sing
    - Runner-up: Adam Pearson – A Different Man
- Best Screenplay:
  - Jesse Eisenberg – A Real Pain
    - Runner-up: Sean Baker – Anora
- Best Cinematography:
  - Jomo Fray – Nickel Boys
    - Runner-up: Lol Crawley – The Brutalist
- Best Editing:
  - Nicholas Monsour – Nickel Boys (TIE)
  - Hansjörg Weißbrich – September 5 (TIE)
- Best Music Score:
  - Trent Reznor and Atticus Ross – Challengers
    - Runner-up: Eiko Ishibashi – Evil Does Not Exist
- Best Production Design:
  - Judy Becker – The Brutalist
    - Runner-up: Adam Stockhausen – Blitz
- Best Film Not in the English Language:
  - All We Imagine as Light
    - Runner-up: The Seed of the Sacred Fig
- Best Documentary/Non-Fiction Film:
  - No Other Land
    - Runner-up: Dahomey
- Best Animation:
  - Flow
    - Runner-up: Chicken for Linda!
- New Generation Award:
  - Vera Drew – The People's Joker
- Career Achievement Award:
  - John Carpenter
- The Douglas Edwards Experimental Film Award:
  - Eduardo Williams' The Human Surge 3
- Special Citation:
  - Adam Hyman (for decades of curating, programming, and administrating the screenings and other events of LA Filmforum)
