= Dolly de Leon =

Filipino actress (born 1969)

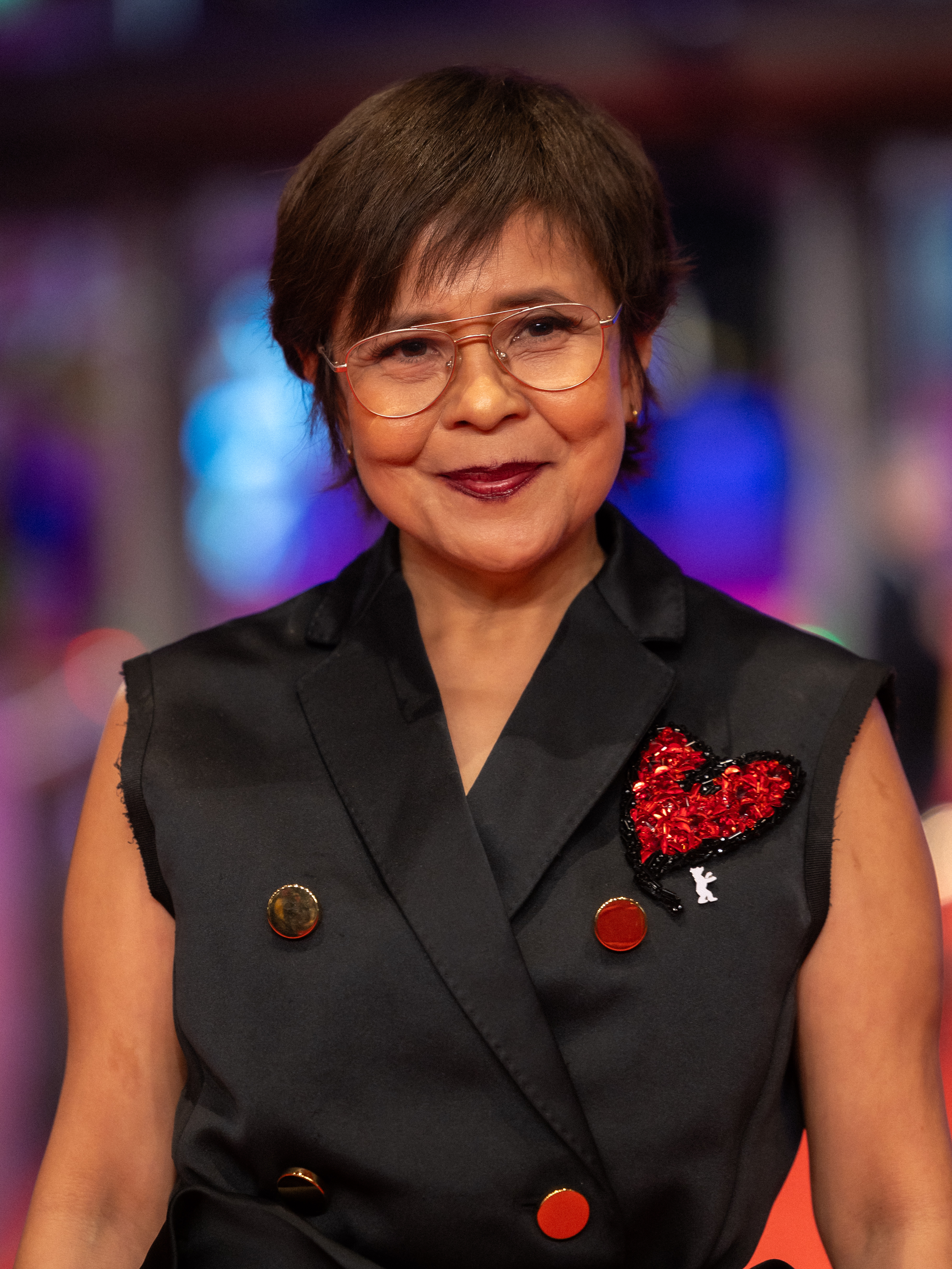
- De Leon at the 2024 Berlin International Film Festival
- Born: April 12, 1969 (age 57); Manila, Philippines
- Education: University of the Philippines Diliman
- Occupation: Actress
- Years active: 1991–present
- Children: 4

Dolly de Leon (born April 12, 1969) is a Filipina actress. Known primarily for her work in independent films and theater, she has received numerous accolades, including a FAMAS Award, a Guldbagge Award, and a Los Angeles Film Critics Association Award, in addition to nominations for a Golden Globe Award and a BAFTA Award. British Vogue named her one of the 31 most famous stars in the world in 2023.

After studying theater at the University of the Philippines Diliman, De Leon began acting on stage. Her earliest performances include local productions of The Merchant of Venice, Waiting for Godot, Old Times, and Medea. She made her film debut in Peque Gallaga's horror anthology Shake, Rattle & Roll III (1991) and was cast in small and uncredited roles throughout the 1990s and 2000s. De Leon made brief appearances in films and took on guest parts in television shows. Her breakthrough came in the crime drama Verdict (2019), for which she won a FAMAS Award for Best Supporting Actress. In 2021, she portrayed an aging sex worker in Lav Diaz's period drama History of Ha to positive reviews. She followed it with more assertive parts in Erik Matti's HBO television projects On the Job and Folklore.

De Leon achieved international recognition and acclaim for her performance as a toilet cleaner on a luxury yacht in Ruben Östlund's satirical black comedy Triangle of Sadness (2022), winning the Guldbagge Award and Los Angeles Film Critics Association Award for Best Supporting Performance. She received nominations for a Golden Globe Award and for a BAFTA Award for Best Supporting Actress, becoming the first Filipino to be nominated for the awards in any category. De Leon has since starred in the adult animated drama The Missing (2023)—for which she won a Cinemalaya Award for Best Supporting Actress—and the 2024 comedy dramas Between the Temples and Ghostlight. She is the co-founder of Ladies Who Launch, a social services group which supports disadvantaged communities.

== Early life and background ==
De Leon was born on April 12, 1969, in Manila, Philippines. She is the youngest child of parents who are native of Ilocos and Visayas. Her father, Juan de Leon Jr., worked as an engineer. Her mother, Rosie de Leon, was a homemaker and a professional bowler, who earned a gold medal when the Philippines won the team event at the 1983 Southeast Asian Games. Her maternal grandfather, Manuel Earnshaw, was an opera singer who performed at the Manila Metropolitan Theater. She has an older brother, who is seven years her senior. Growing up, she considered herself an introvert: "I didn't have any playmates. I would talk to myself, my dolls. I would dress up. Typical kid [who's] always living in a fantasy world." De Leon disliked school and has stated that she disobeyed rules and "wanted to do things [her] way". Although she struggled academically, De Leon excelled in the performing arts. She acted in school theater productions and was a member of the drama, dance, and glee clubs.

De Leon attended the University of the Philippines Diliman, where she majored in theater arts. Her interest in pursuing a career in acting began when she served as a wardrobe supervisor for the stage productions: "I would watch behind in the wings at the backstage and was so amazed at what they were doing and that's when I really fell in love with theater ... I want to do stage plays." De Leon's first acting assignment was in a play written by Floy Quintos and directed by Tony Mabesa, portraying a rural laundrywoman. Despite having brief speaking parts, she described it as "one of [her] best theater experiences". She considered Mabesa as a mentor who trained her using an "acting-for-dummies style" process, and credits professor Jose Estrella for teaching acting techniques to prepare her for playing roles on film and television. During this period, she appeared in several plays, including Harold Pinter's Old Times and Samuel Beckett's Waiting for Godot. Her other roles include the protagonist Portia in William Shakespeare's The Merchant of Venice and the dual parts of a nurse and a messenger in the Greek tragedy Medea.

== Career ==
=== 1991–2018: Early work ===
De Leon made her film debut as a background actor in Peque Gallaga's horror anthology Shake, Rattle & Roll III (1991), a part she later described as one during which she had "the spotlight for a few seconds". Although she had not aspired to become a film actor, De Leon was cast in several screen roles but also acted in plays, calling it her "true love". While struggling to establish her acting career, she worked various jobs, including as a mascot performer, waitress, and cashier to make ends meet. Following this lack of success, she considered quitting acting permanently but her daughter persuaded her to persevere with it; motivated by this, she continued to audition.

During the next decade, De Leon appeared predominantly in small and uncredited roles, playing characters which she described as "a device to get the story moving or a sounding board for the lead". In a 2022 interview with Vanity Fair, she expressed frustration at being typecast into nameless and fleeting parts, though she did not mind this if it led to steady work, remarking, "If I'm going to keep playing the same characters, I might as well have fun with them, not take everything so seriously." De Leon's career prospects improved when she was cast in Jerrold Tarog's horror thriller Aswang (2011), playing the mother of Paulo Avelino's character. An abridged retelling of Peque Gallaga's 1992 film of the same name, it was nominated for Movie of the Year at the 2012 Star Awards for Movies. She then played supporting roles in the television series Pintada (2012), Ang Dalawang Mrs. Real (2014), Yagit (2014), Mirabella (2014), and Pusong Ligaw (2017).

The coming-of-age drama Billie and Emma (2018), directed by Samantha Lee, saw De Leon portray a stern principal nun of an all-girls Catholic school. The film was screened internationally, including at the Osaka Asian Film Festival, Frameline Film Festival, Tel Aviv International LGBT Film Festival, and Inside Out Film and Video Festival. In the last of these, it won the Audience Award for Best Feature Film. The critic Ryan Oquiza of The Philippine Star found her performance captured the "needless rigidity and glaring fallibility" of the character.

=== 2019–2021: Career expansion ===
Lav Diaz's science fiction drama The Halt (2019) featured De Leon as an education minister in a post-apocalyptic Manila, where people are fighting an oppressive regime headed by Joel Lamangan's character. The film premiered at the 2019 Cannes Film Festival during the Directors' Fortnight showcase. She next starred in Raymund Ribay Gutierrez's crime drama Verdict (2019). It tells the story of an abused wife (played by Max Eigenmann) seeking justice amid a flawed legal system. In the film, De Leon played the abusive husband's mother, who is conflicted in paying for her son's legal fees The film premiered at the 2019 Toronto International Film Festival, and was generally well received by critics. It was also screened as part of the Orizzonti section at the 2019 Venice International Film Festival, where it garnered the Special Jury Prize. The Philippine Star's Oquiza thought her portrayal was "visceral and stirring". De Leon won Best Supporting Actress at the FAMAS Awards, and received a nomination at the Luna Awards in the same category. Verdict was the Philippine's official entry for Best International Feature Film at the 92nd Academy Awards.

In Midnight in a Perfect World (2020), a horror thriller about unexplained disappearances caused by rolling blackouts, starring Glaiza de Castro, Jasmine Curtis-Smith, Dino Pastrano, and Anthony Falcon, De Leon played the supporting role of Pastrano's mother, in a performance described by Oquiza as unorthodox and "hard to categorize". The film was screened at the Fantasia International Film Festival. The following year, De Leon starred in an episode of the HBO Asia horror anthology series Folklore, which premiered on December 5, 2021. Directed by Erik Matti, it tells the story of a police officer (De Leon) whose son is a voodoo practitioner. She then had a guest role in the six-part HBO Go miniseries On the Job, a television sequel to the 2013 film of the same name. De Leon portrayed Inday Arcega, a criminal from an organized syndicate that carries out political executions. That same year, De Leon reunited with Diaz in the period drama History of Ha (2021), in which she played an aging sex worker who meets a disheartened ventriloquist (played by John Lloyd Cruz). She was drawn to the character's multifaceted persona and was invigorated with the idea of not playing subsidiary roles. Set in the aftermath of the 1957 airplane crash of then-Philippine president Ramon Magsaysay, the project was filmed in Sibaltan, Palawan. It premiered at the 2021 BFI London Film Festival. Oquiza took note of how well she "blends comic relief with a commanding presence through bluntness and candor", adding that: "Her true brilliance lies in portraying her character's silent vulnerability, facing the reality of aging and lost beauty." According to Fred Hawson of ABS-CBNnews.com, De Leon lent her charm and appeal to the film, and displayed fortitude in her physical performance. She received a Gawad Urian Award nomination for Best Supporting Actress for the role.

=== 2022–present: International recognition ===
De Leon's international breakthrough came in 2022 when she starred in Ruben Östlund's satirical black comedy Triangle of Sadness. The film follows a celebrity couple on a luxury cruise with wealthy guests that end up stranded on an island and fighting for survival. The part of Abigail, a toilet cleaner who usurps command over the survivors, was written by Östlund with a Filipino in mind. The casting director auditioned a number of actors in the Philippines. Impressed by her improvization, Östlund cast De Leon after doing a read-through. De Leon, whose mother is an overseas migrant worker, believed that the role mirrored certain aspects of her life. Drawing from experiences of family members employed within the service industry, she stated, "Quiet and unassuming, my loved ones kept ... their heads down, absorbing microaggressions under a layer of agreeableness, their smiles protecting their livelihoods." Describing the character as a "quadruple threat"—a middle-aged, Asian, immigrant woman—De Leon collaborated closely with Östlund to create Abigail's origin; and, to get into her mental space, De Leon wrote a first-person narrative to identify with her motivations and how she learned to build a fire and catch fish.

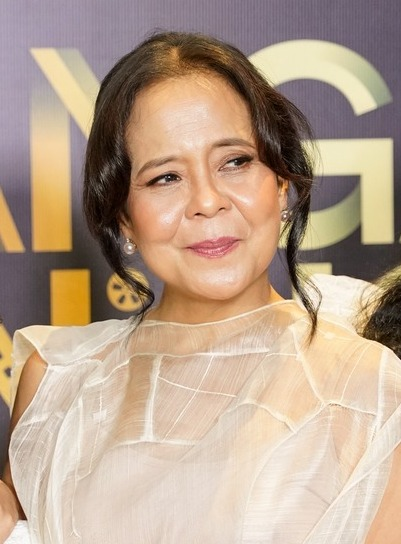
De Leon at the Film Development Council of the Philippines' Honor of Arts in 2023

Triangle of Sadness premiered at the 2022 Cannes Film Festival, where it won the Palme d'Or. De Leon's performance received critical acclaim; Esther Zuckerman of The Hollywood Reporter wrote that she "balances deft comedy, visceral anger and potent sensuality", and Clayton Davis of Variety praised her "utterly lived-in and commanding" portrayal, describing her as an "acting giant" who delivered the "defining supporting performance of the year". Writing for The Guardian, Ryan Gilbey considered her to be "intensely satisfying" and credited De Leon for playing a "woman who harbors enough experience of injustice and reserves of strength to pounce on power". De Leon received significant awards attention for her role in Triangle of Sadness. She won the Los Angeles Film Critics Association Award and Guldbagge Award for Best Supporting Actress, and received nominations for the Golden Globe Award and BAFTA Award in the same category. She became the first Filipino to be nominated for the last two awards.

After a brief appearance in the revenge drama series Dirty Linen (2023), De Leon voiced Rosalinda in the adult animated drama The Missing (2023). She played the mother of Carlo Aquino's character who prompts her son to track his uncle's disappearance. The film was notable for its use of rotoscoping, a technique in which scenes are first shot in live-action, then traced onto animation cels. In his review for Rappler, Oquiza remarked that De Leon "emanates a caring and supportive presence" and highlighted her "understated bravura". Similar sentiments were echoed by ABS-CBNnews.com's Fred Hawson, who commended her "sweet maternal interaction". She won Best Supporting Actress at the 2023 Cinemalaya Independent Film Festival. The Missing was submitted for consideration at the 96th Academy Awards for Best International Feature Film. De Leon served as jury president of the 2023 Summer Metro Manila Film Festival. The Petersen Vargas-directed black comedy A Very Good Girl, opposite Kathryn Bernardo, was De Leon's next release of the year. Playing the character of a powerful and demanding retail mogul was a departure from De Leon's previous "gritty roles" and an experience she found enjoyable. MovieWeb's Greg Archer called the film a "quirky and fun ride", and considered De Leon to be "deliciously savage and thoroughly fun to experience". A Very Good Girl was a commercial success, earning over ₱100 million (US$2.03 million), making it one of the highest-grossing Filipino films of 2023.

De Leon began 2024 with two releases that premiered at the Sundance Film Festival. She executive produced and starred in Ghostlight, a comedy drama directed by Kelly O'Sullivan and Alex Thompson. Set in Chicago, the film casts De Leon as a community theater performer who encourages a dejected construction worker (played by Keith Kupferer) to take part in their production of Romeo and Juliet. The critic Adrian Horton of The Guardian said De Leon "blazes in every scene, not missing a single ego-deflating punchline", while The Hollywood Reporter's Jon Frosch found her portrayal of the "bossy, chain-smoking, F-bomb-dropping actress" to have the "right balance of absurdity and pathos". De Leon received an honorable mention in Gold House's Gold List: Film 2025 for Best Performance in a Supporting Role (Rita) for this performance. In Nathan Silver's comedy film Between the Temples, she played an overbearing stepmother to Jason Schwartzman's character. She next appeared in Paul Feig's action comedy Jackpot! for Amazon Prime Video. In October of the same year, she began starring in a Filipino production of the Franz Xaver Kroetz wordless solo play Wunschkonzert (or Request Program), retitled Request sa Radyo, at the Samsung Performing Arts Center in Makati. She alternates the lead role of Ms. Reyes with Filipino actress Lea Salonga. De Leon will next star, alongside Nicole Kidman, in the second season of the Hulu thriller drama series Nine Perfect Strangers, based on the 2018 novel by Liane Moriarty. She will also appear in the television series Severino, a biopic on the Filipino priest Juan Severino Mallari.

== Personal life ==
De Leon stated in 2023 that she was separated and is a single parent who raised four children. She resides in an apartment with her family, and said that she enjoys domestic routines like reading books, going to beaches, and playing board games. Discussing her early insecurities, she has said she was once socially reticent due to career struggles but has since gained confidence. She has cited the actress Isabelle Huppert as an influence and believes that Huppert's eyes alone express emotions. She also admires Meryl Streep's acting versatility. As an actor who made her breakthrough in her 50s, De Leon is an advocate for diversity in roles that older women play on screen, arguing that they should not be typecast to maternal characters.

In 2013, De Leon co-founded Ladies Who Launch, a social services organization which provides outreach to underserved communities. During the COVID-19 pandemic, the group created soup kitchens in support of efforts to address food insecurity. She also took part in Project Hulmahan, an initiative which auctioned paintings to raise money for community livelihood programs. In 2023, De Leon taught a master class at the University of the Philippines Diliman's Department of Speech Communication and Theatre Arts.

British Vogue named De Leon one of the 31 most famous stars in the world in 2023. That same year, she was invited to join the Academy of Motion Picture Arts and Sciences, and she was honored with the Arts and Culture Award by Tatler Philippines.

== Acting credits ==
=== Film ===
Key
| † | Denotes films that have not yet been released |

Dolly de Leon's film credits with year of release, film titles and roles
| Year | Title | Role | Notes | Ref(s). |
|---|---|---|---|---|
| 1991 | Shake, Rattle & Roll III | Roommate | | |
| 2009 | The Arrival | Sally | | |
| 2010 | Senior Year | Jackie's mother | | |
| 2011 | Anatomiya ng Korupsiyon | May | | |
| 2011 | Aswang | Daniel's mother | | |
| 2014 | Diary ng Panget | Doctor | | |
| 2014 | Trophy Wife | Court clerk | | |
| 2016 | Gasping for Air | Angie | | |
| 2016 | If You Leave | —N/a | | |
| 2018 | Hintayan ng Langit | Mayor Susan | | |
| 2018 | Billie and Emma | Sister Mary | | |
| 2019 | Cuddle Weather | Rosie | | |
| 2019 | Ang Babae Sa Septic Tank 3 | Rizalista leader | | |
| 2019 | The Halt | Education minister | | |
| 2019 | Sunod | Receptionist | | |
| 2019 | Verdict | Elsa | | |
| 2020 | Midnight in a Perfect World | Ella | | |
| 2021 | History of Ha | Dahlia | | |
| 2021 | On the Job: The Missing 8 | Inday Arcega | | |
| 2022 | Triangle of Sadness | Abigail | | |
| 2022 | Kitty K7 | Hana's mother | | |
| 2022 | #DoYouThinkIAmSEXY? | Allado | | |
| 2023 | Nothing Like Paris | Tita Fely | | |
| 2023 | The Missing | Rosalinda | | |
| 2023 | Duyan ng Magiting | Sebastian | | |
| 2023 | A Very Good Girl | Molly Suzara | | |
| 2023 | Keys to the Heart | Sylvia | | |
| 2024 | Between the Temples | Judith | | |
| 2024 | Ghostlight | Rita | Also executive producer | |
| 2024 | Jackpot! | Tala Almazan | | |
| 2024 | Salome | Christine | | |
| 2025 | Habang Nilalamon ng Hydra ang Kasaysayan | Bea Consuelo | | |
| 2026 | Forgotten Island | Lola Fatima (voice) | | |
| TBA | The Chaperones † | | Post-production | |

=== Television ===
Key
| † | Denotes shows that have not yet been aired |

Dolly De Leon's television credits with year of release, title(s) and role
| Year | Title | Role | Notes | Ref(s) |
|---|---|---|---|---|
| 2001 | Sa Dulo ng Walang Hanggan | Atty. Panlilio | | |
| 2012 | Pintada | Paz Bautista | | |
| 2014 | Yagit | Amparo Estrella | | |
| 2014 | Mirabella | Aurora Crisanta | | |
| 2014 | Ang Dalawang Mrs. Real | Felisa San Jose | | |
| 2014 | Magpakailanman | Renz | Episode: "Ang Aking Kakaibang Pag-ibig" | |
| 2017 | Ikaw Lang ang Iibigin | Chuchay | | |
| 2017 | Pusong Ligaw | Mrs. Corpus | | |
| 2017 | Ipaglaban Mo! | Dasiy Quesada | Episode: "Groufie" | |
| 2019 | Jhon en Martian | 223's Lola | | |
| 2019 | Hiwaga ng Kambat | Virgie | | |
| 2019 | Ipaglaban Mo! | Naty | Episode: "Angkan" | |
| 2019 | Mga Batang Poz | Health Consultant | | |
| 2019 | Call Me Tita | Dr. Pacis | | |
| 2020 | Anak ni Waray vs. Anak ni Biday | Amy's mother | | |
| 2020 | Unconditional | Psychologist | | |
| 2021 | On the Job | Inday Arcega | | |
| 2021 | Folklore | Lourdes | Episode: "7 Days of Hell" | |
| 2021 | The Kangks Show | Mrs. Daks Chaser | | |
| 2022 | Magpakailanman | Irma | Episode: "My Kidney Belongs to You" | |
| 2022 | He's Into Her | Mrs. Catalan | Episodes: "Operation: Deib", "Tests and Trials" | |
| 2023 | Dirty Linen | Olivia Salvacion | | |
| 2023 | Simula sa Gitna | Mayor Susan | | |
| 2025 | Nine Perfect Strangers | Agnes | Main cast (Season 2) | |
| 2025 | Severino: The First Serial Killer | TBA | | |
| 2026 | Avatar: The Last Airbender | Lo and Li | Episode: "Somewhere Safe" | |
| 2026 | Maximum Pleasure Guaranteed | Detective Sofia Gonzalez | Main role | |

=== Theatre ===
| Year | Title | Role | Venue | Notes | Ref(s). |
|---|---|---|---|---|---|
| 2024 | Request sa Radyo | Ms. Reyes | Samsung Performing Arts Center, Makati | | |

== Accolades ==
Awards and nominations received by Dolly De Leon
| Award | Year (Note: Indicates the year of ceremony. Each year is linked to the article about the awards held that year, wherever possible.) | Work | Category | Result | Ref(s) |
|---|---|---|---|---|---|
| British Academy Film Awards | 2022 | Triangle of Sadness | Best Actress in a Supporting Role | Nominated | |
| Cinemalaya Philippine Independent Film Festival | 2023 | The Missing | Best Supporting Actress | Won | |
| Columbus Film Critics Association | 2022 | Triangle of Sadness | Best Supporting Performance | Nominated | |
| DiscussingFilm Critic Awards | 2023 | Triangle of Sadness | Best Breakthrough Performance | Nominated | |
| DiscussingFilm Critic Awards | 2023 | Triangle of Sadness | Best Supporting Actress | Nominated | |
| Dorian Awards | 2023 | Triangle of Sadness | Supporting Film Performance of the Year | Nominated | |
| EDDYS Awards | 2024 | Keys to the Heart | Best Supporting Actress | Pending | |
| FAMAS Awards | 2020 | Verdict | Best Supporting Actress | Won | |
| FAMAS Awards | 2024 | A Very Good Girl | Best Supporting Actress | Nominated | |
| Film Critics Association UK | 2022 | Triangle of Sadness | Supporting Actress of the Year | Nominated | |
| Gawad Buhay | 2017 | Tribes | Outstanding Ensemble Performance | Won | |
| Gawad Urian Awards | 2022 | History of Ha | Best Supporting Actress | Nominated | |
| Gawad Urian Awards | 2024 | Ang Duyan ng Magiting | Best Supporting Actress | Won | |
| Golden Globe Awards | 2023 | Triangle of Sadness | Best Supporting Actress – Motion Picture | Nominated | |
| Greater Western New York Film Critics Association | 2022 | Triangle of Sadness | Best Supporting Actress | Nominated | |
| Guldbagge Awards | 2023 | Triangle of Sadness | Best Actress in a Supporting Role | Won | |
| International Cinephile Society | 2023 | Triangle of Sadness | Best Supporting Actress | Nominated | |
| Latino Entertainment Journalists Association | 2023 | Triangle of Sadness | Best Supporting Actress | Nominated | |
| London Film Critics' Circle | 2022 | Triangle of Sadness | Supporting Actress of the Year | Nominated | |
| Los Angeles Film Critics Association | 2022 | Triangle of Sadness | Best Supporting Performance | Won (Note: Shared with Ke Huy Quan for Everything Everywhere All at Once) | |
| Luna Awards | 2020 | Verdict | Best Supporting Actress | Nominated | |
| Middleburg Film Festival | 2022 | Triangle of Sadness | Breakthrough Performance Award | Won | |
| National Society of Film Critics Awards | 2022 | Triangle of Sadness | Best Supporting Actress | Runner-up (Note: Tied with Nina Hoss for Tár) | |
| North Dakota Film Society | 2023 | Triangle of Sadness | Best Supporting Actress | Won | |
| Online Association of Female Film Critics | 2022 | Triangle of Sadness | Best Supporting Actress | Nominated | |
| Online Film Critics Society | 2022 | Triangle of Sadness | Best Supporting Actress | Nominated | |
| Portland Critics Association | 2022 | Triangle of Sadness | Best Actress in a Supporting Role | Nominated | |
| San Francisco Bay Area Film Critics Circle | 2022 | Triangle of Sadness | Best Supporting Actress | Nominated | |
| Satellite Awards | 2022 | Triangle of Sadness | Best Supporting Actress – Motion Picture | Nominated | |
| Star Awards for Movies | 2024 | Keys to the Heart | Best Supporting Actress | Pending | |
| Vancouver Film Critics Circle | 2022 | Triangle of Sadness | Best Supporting Actress | Nominated | |
