= Los Angeles Film Critics Association Award for Best Supporting Actor =

Annual US film award

- Awarded for: Best Performance by an Actor in a Supporting Role
- Country: United States
- Presented by: Los Angeles Film Critics Association
- First award: Jason Robards; Julia (1977)
- Final award: Vincent Lindon, Titane and Kodi Smit-McPhee, The Power of the Dog (2021)
- Website: lafca.net

The Los Angeles Film Critics Association Award for Best Supporting Actor was an award given annually by the Los Angeles Film Critics Association. It was first introduced in 1977 to reward the best performance by a supporting actor. In 2022, it was announced that the four acting categories would be retired and replaced with two gender neutral categories, with both Best Supporting Actor and Best Supporting Actress merging into the Best Supporting Performance category.

== Winners ==
=== 1970s ===
Year	Winner	Film	Role
1977	Jason Robards	Julia	Dashiell Hammett
1978	Robert Morley	Who Is Killing the Great Chefs of Europe?	Max
1979	Melvyn Douglas	Being There	Benjamin Turnbull Rand
1979	Melvyn Douglas	The Seduction of Joe Tynan	Senator Birney

=== 1980s ===
Year	Winner	Film	Role
1980	Timothy Hutton	Ordinary People	Conrad Jarrett
1981	John Gielgud	Arthur	Hobson
1982	John Lithgow	The World According to Garp	Roberta Muldoon
1983	Jack Nicholson	Terms of Endearment	Garrett Breedlove
1984	Adolph Caesar	A Soldier's Story	Sergeant Waters
1985	John Gielgud	Plenty	Leonard Darwin
1985	John Gielgud	The Shooting Party	Cornelius Cardew
1986	Dennis Hopper	Blue Velvet	Frank Booth
1986	Dennis Hopper	Hoosiers	Shooter Flatch
1987	Morgan Freeman	Street Smart	Fast Black
1988	Alec Guinness	Little Dorrit	William Dorrit
1989	Danny Aiello	Do the Right Thing	Sal

=== 1990s ===
Year	Winner	Film	Role
1990	Joe Pesci	Goodfellas	Tommy DeVito
1991	Michael Lerner	Barton Fink	Jack Lipnick
1992	Gene Hackman	Unforgiven	Little Bill Daggett
1993	Tommy Lee Jones	The Fugitive	Samuel Gerard
1994	Martin Landau	Ed Wood	Bela Lugosi
1995	Don Cheadle	Devil in a Blue Dress	Mouse Alexander
1996	Edward Norton	Everyone Says I Love You	Holden Spence
1996	Edward Norton	The People vs. Larry Flynt	Alan Isaacman
1996	Edward Norton	Primal Fear	Aaron Stampler
1997	Burt Reynolds	Boogie Nights	Jack Horner
1998	Bill Murray	Rushmore	Herman Blume
1998	Bill Murray	Wild Things	Kenneth Bowden
1998	Billy Bob Thornton	A Simple Plan	Jacob Mitchell
1999	Christopher Plummer	The Insider	Mike Wallace

=== 2000s ===
Year	Winner	Film	Role
2000	Willem Dafoe	Shadow of the Vampire	Max Schreck
2001	Jim Broadbent	Iris	John Bayley
2001	Jim Broadbent	Moulin Rouge!	Harold Zidler
2002	Chris Cooper	Adaptation.	John Laroche
2003	Bill Nighy	AKA	Louis Gryffoyn
2003	Bill Nighy	I Capture the Castle	James Mortmain
2003	Bill Nighy	Lawless Heart	Dan
2003	Bill Nighy	Love Actually	Billy Mack
2004	Thomas Haden Church	Sideways	Jack Lopate
2005	William Hurt	A History of Violence	Richie Cusack
2006	Michael Sheen	The Queen	Tony Blair
2007	Vlad Ivanov	4 Months, 3 Weeks and 2 Days	Mr. Bebe
2008	Heath Ledger (posthumous)	The Dark Knight	The Joker
2009	Christoph Waltz	Inglourious Basterds	Col. Hans Landa

=== 2010s ===
Year	Winner	Film	Role
2010	Niels Arestrup	A Prophet (Un prophète)	César Luciani
2011	Christopher Plummer	Beginners	Hal Fields
2012	Dwight Henry	Beasts of the Southern Wild	Wink
2013	James Franco	Spring Breakers	Alien
2013	Jared Leto	Dallas Buyers Club	Rayon
2014	J. K. Simmons	Whiplash	Terrence Fletcher
2015	Michael Shannon	99 Homes	Rick Carver
2016	Mahershala Ali	Moonlight	Juan
2017	Willem Dafoe	The Florida Project	Bobby Hicks
2018	Steven Yeun	Burning	Ben
2019	Song Kang-ho	Parasite	Kim Ki-taek

=== 2020s ===
Year	Winner	Film	Role
2020	Glynn Turman	Ma Rainey's Black Bottom	Toledo
2021	Vincent Lindon	Titane	Vincent Legrand
2021	Kodi Smit-McPhee	The Power of the Dog	Peter Gordon

== Multiple winners ==
2 wins

- Willem Dafoe (2000, 2017)
- John Gielgud (1981, 1985)
- Christopher Plummer (1999, 2011)

== See also ==
- National Board of Review Award for Best Supporting Actor
- New York Film Critics Circle Award for Best Supporting Actor
- National Society of Film Critics Award for Best Supporting Actor
- Academy Award for Best Supporting Actor
