= Triangle of Sadness =

2022 film by Ruben Östlund

- US theatrical release poster
- Directed by: Ruben Östlund
- Written by: Ruben Östlund
- Produced by: Erik Hemmendorff; Philippe Bober
- Starring: Harris Dickinson; Charlbi Dean; Dolly de Leon; Zlatko Burić; Iris Berben; Vicki Berlin; Henrik Dorsin; Jean-Christophe Folly; Amanda Walker; Oliver Ford Davies; Sunnyi Melles; Woody Harrelson
- Cinematography: Fredrik Wenzel
- Edited by: Ruben Östlund; Mikel Cee Karlsson
- Music by: Mikkel Maltha; Leslie Ming
- Production companies: BBC Film; BFI; Imperative Entertainment; Coproduction Office; Plattform Produktion; Film i Väst; 30West; Essential Films; Sveriges Television; ZDF/Arte; Arte France Cinéma; TRT Sinema; Svenska Filminstitutet; Eurimages – Council of Europe; Medienboard Berlin-Brandenburg; The Danish Film Institute; MOIN – Film Fund Hamburg Schelswig-Holstein; Nordisk Film & TV Fond; Arte France; DR; Canal+; Ciné+; Heretic; Bord Cadre Films; Sovereign Films; Piano
- Distributed by: SF Studios (Sweden); Alamode Filmverleih (Germany); BAC Films (France); Lionsgate; Curzon (Note: Curzon Film purchased UK and Ireland distribution rights to the film at the Cannes Film Festival, but sold them to Lionsgate prior to the film's release. Curzon retained a certain stake in the film, had rights to the film's profits and marketed the film together with Lionsgate.) (United Kingdom); Neon (United States)
- Release dates: 21 May 2022 (Cannes); 28 September 2022 (France); 7 October 2022 (Sweden); 13 October 2022 (Germany); 28 October 2022 (United Kingdom)
- Running time: 147 minutes
- Countries: Sweden; Germany; France; United Kingdom
- Language: English
- Budget: $15.6 million
- Box office: $32.9 million

Triangle of Sadness is a 2022 satirical black comedy film written and directed by Ruben Östlund in his English-language feature debut. The film stars an ensemble cast led by Harris Dickinson, Charlbi Dean (in her final film role), Dolly de Leon, Zlatko Burić, Iris Berben, Vicki Berlin, Henrik Dorsin, Jean-Christophe Folly, Amanda Walker, Oliver Ford Davies, Sunnyi Melles, and Woody Harrelson. It follows a celebrity couple on a luxury cruise with wealthy guests who end up stranded on an island and fighting for survival.

The film had its world premiere at the 75th Cannes Film Festival on 21 May 2022, where it received an eight-minute standing ovation and was awarded the Palme d'Or. It grossed over $32.8 million worldwide and received positive reviews from critics, who mostly praised Östlund's direction and screenplay, as well as the performances of the cast (particularly de Leon). At the 95th Academy Awards, the film earned three nominations: Best Picture, Best Director, and Best Original Screenplay. It was nominated for Best Motion Picture – Musical or Comedy and Best Supporting Actress (for de Leon) at the 80th Golden Globe Awards, and for Best Actress in a Supporting Role (for de Leon), Best Original Screenplay, and Best Casting at the 76th British Academy Film Awards. Among other accolades, it won Best Film, Best Director, Best Screenwriter, and Best Actor (for Burić) at the 35th European Film Awards.

== Plot ==
=== Part 1: Carl & Yaya ===
Carl, a model, attends an uncomfortable and demeaning casting call with other male models. Carl is dating Yaya, a fellow model and influencer, and resents her for expecting him to pay for meals even though she earns far more than he does. They bicker about money and gender roles. Yaya admits that she is in a relationship with Carl for the engagement it earns them on social media, and that she seeks to become a trophy wife, but Carl declares that she will come to love him.

=== Part 2: The Yacht ===
Carl and Yaya are invited on a luxury cruise aboard a superyacht in exchange for its social media promotion.

Among the guests are the Russian oligarch Dimitry and his wife Vera; the elderly couple Clementine and Winston, who have made their fortune manufacturing grenades and other weapons; Therese, a wheelchair user only capable of speaking a single phrase in German (in den Wolken, i.e. "in the clouds") following a stroke; and Jarmo, a lonely tech millionaire who flirts with Yaya, who uses her sexual appeal to influence him despite this making Carl upset.

The guests luxuriate on the yacht, oblivious to the crew working to meet their every need and ridiculous whim. The head of staff, Paula, demands they obey the guests' absurd requests, including having every crew member swim in the sea. The kitchen crew is ordered to swim as well, despite the chef warning that the food will go bad. Carl complains to Paula about a crew member whom Yaya finds attractive, inadvertently getting the man fired. Meanwhile, the yacht's captain, Thomas Smith, spends his time drunk in his cabin.

Despite a raging storm, the staff carries on with holding a fine dining dinner the guests expect. The guests become violently ill with a combination of food poisoning and seasickness due to the food being left out earlier in the day and the tumultuous storm. The drunken Thomas and Dimitry debate in favor of communism and capitalism, respectively, which is broadcast over the intercom. The guests spend the evening puking while wearing their life jackets, creating a mess and flooding the sewage system. While the menial staff get to work cleaning things up, the guest staff sabotage the entire ship's power in an attempt to cut the captain's intercom to put on a cheerful face and stop him from upsetting the guests.

When morning arrives, pirates attack, killing Clementine and Winston with one of their own grenades and sinking the yacht.

=== Part 3: The Island ===
A small group of survivors consisting of guests Carl, Yaya, Dimitry, Therese, and Jarmo, ship's head of guest staff Paula, ship's mechanic Nelson (whom Dimitry accuses of being a pirate), and Toilet Manager Abigail manage to escape to an island. At first, Paula continues to order Abigail to serve the useless cruise guests. When it becomes clear that Abigail is the only one with survival skills, such as catching fish and starting a fire, the traditional class system is upended.

Abigail rises in power and the others must curry her favor with gifts and labor. Paula quickly shifts allegiance to Abigail. Abigail gains her own private shelter inside a lifeboat and lures Carl into a sexual relationship by giving him food in exchange for sexual favors. Yaya grows resentful at the role reversal and is disoriented that her own lack of sexual power in the situation on the island means she has zero means of influence. The wealthy guests remain fairly nonchalant and carry on like normal, creating games and making art. Jarmo kills a wild donkey for food by smashing it with a rock, which Dimitry, Nelson and the others celebrate with a primitive dinner party.

When Yaya decides to hike to the other side of the island, Abigail volunteers to go with her. Back at the camp, Therese encounters a beach vendor hawking fake luxury goods, but is unable to communicate her situation to the man as he is only interested in selling to her. Yaya and Abigail discover a lift built into the rocks and realize they have been stranded near a luxury resort. Yaya celebrates finding the lift, but Abigail prepares to attack Yaya with a rock to prevent her from telling the others and forcing Abigail to return to a menial, powerless role back in society. The camera cuts away to an injured Carl frantically running through the jungle.

== Cast ==
- Harris Dickinson as Carl
- Charlbi Dean as Yaya
- Dolly de Leon as Abigail
- Zlatko Burić as Dimitry
- Iris Berben as Therese
- Vicki Berlin as Paula
- Henrik Dorsin as Jarmo
- Jean-Christophe Folly as Nelson
- Amanda Walker as Clementine
- Oliver Ford Davies as Winston
- Sunnyi Melles as Vera
- Woody Harrelson as Captain Thomas Smith

== Production ==
Triangle of Sadness was announced by director Ruben Östlund in June 2017, after his film The Square won the Palme d'Or at the 70th Cannes Film Festival the previous month. He said the film was to be called Triangle of Sadness, a "wild" satire set against the world of fashion and the uber-rich, with "appearance as capital" and "beauty as currency" as the underlying themes. The English title refers to a term used by plastic surgeons for the worry wrinkle that forms between the eyebrows, which can be removed with botox.

Research for some parts of the script took place in May 2018. Casting took place from August to November 2018 in Berlin, Paris, London, New York, Los Angeles and Gothenburg, and continued in Moscow in March 2019. Location scouting began in January 2019 and lasted intermittently until October 2019. Östlund fine-tuned the last details of pre-production from November 2019 to the first half of February 2020.

In February 2020, it was reported that Triangle of Sadness would begin principal photography on 19 February in Sweden and Greece, with a 70-day shoot, and that the cast would include Harris Dickinson, Charlbi Dean, and Woody Harrelson. About 120 actors were considered for the role that Dickinson landed, and Emily Ratajkowski was among the actresses who auditioned for Dean's role. On 26 March, production paused due to the COVID-19 pandemic with about 37% of shooting completed. Editing started during the first COVID-19 lockdown in 2020. Production resumed on 27 June in Sweden, allowing Harrelson to finish his scenes, but was halted again on 3 July.

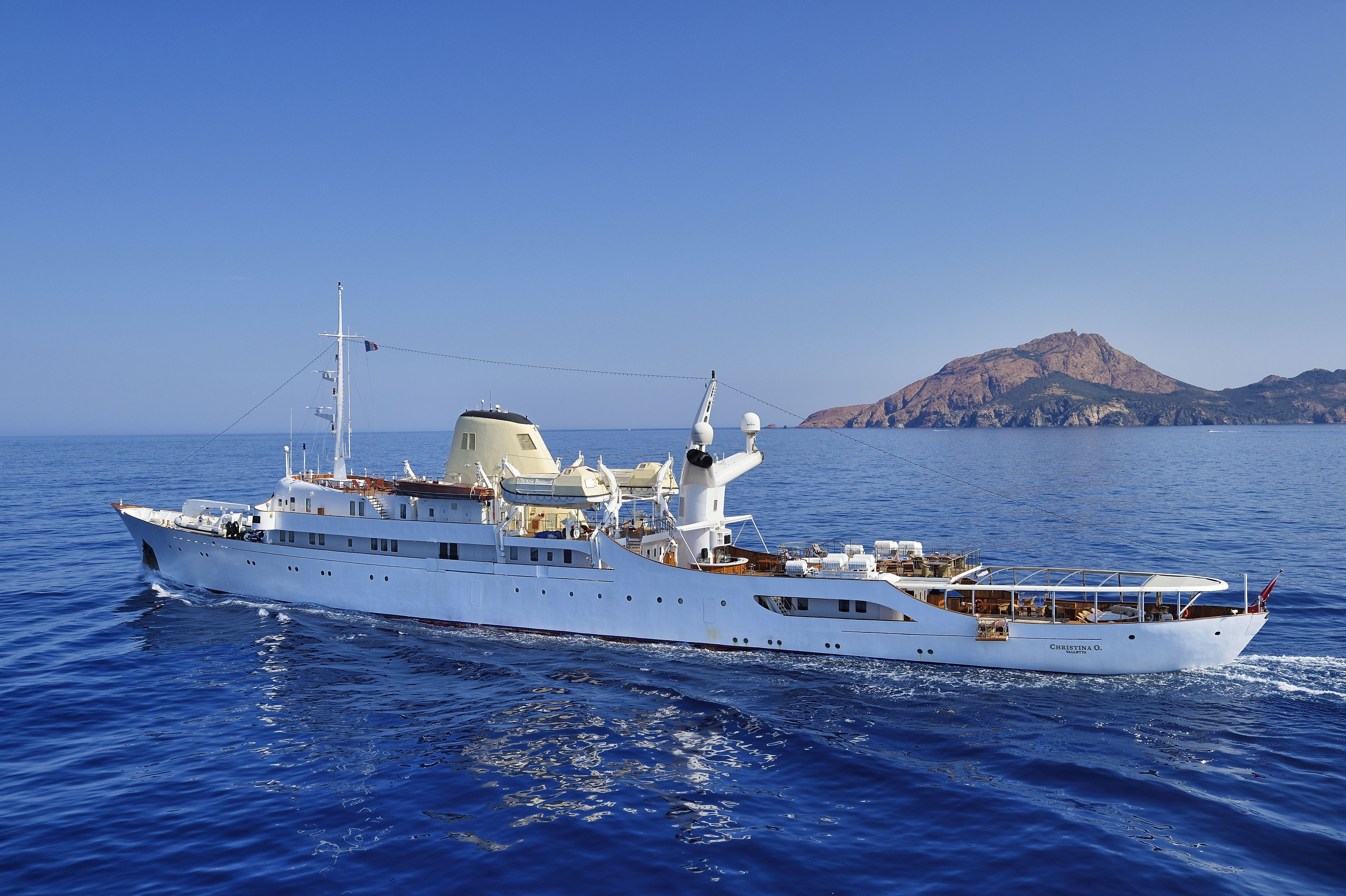
Filming took place on the yacht Christina O.

Production resumed on 18 September on location at Chiliadou Beach, Euboea, Greece, for the last 38 days. Filming wrapped on 13 November 2020, concluding a 73-day shoot. Östlund reported that the production carried out 1,061 COVID-19 tests throughout filming and all were negative. Filming also took place on other Greek islands, on the stages of Film i Väst in Trollhättan, Sweden, and in the Mediterranean Sea on the Christina O, the yacht formerly owned by Aristotle Onassis. Post-production lasted 22 months. According to the actors, Östlund shot as many as 23 takes for each scene.

== Release ==
Triangle of Sadness premiered at the Cannes Film Festival on 21 May 2022, and won the festival's Palme d'Or on 28 May. It was also an official selection of the 2022 Toronto International Film Festival, where it held its North American premiere on 8 September, and the 2022 New York Film Festival (1 October).

Neon acquired North American distribution rights for $8 million, winning a bidding war with A24, Searchlight Pictures/Hulu, Focus Features and Sony Pictures Classics. The film was released in France on 28 September, in Sweden on 7 October, in Germany on 13 October and in the United Kingdom on 28 October.

On VOD, it ranked number 2 on iTunes Movies following the Oscar nomination announcements on 24 January 2023. By 9 March 2023, according to Samba TV, it had been streamed on Hulu in 250,000 households in the United States since the announcements, with JustWatch also reporting it to be, by 21 February, the second most-streamed Best Picture nominee in Canada, behind The Fabelmans.

A 4K UHD, Blu-ray and DVD disc was released by The Criterion Collection on 25 April 2023.

== Reception ==
=== Box office ===
Triangle of Sadness grossed $4.6 million in the United States and Canada, and $28.3 million in other territories, for a total worldwide gross of $32.9 million. It sold over 2 million tickets in Europe.

In the United States, Triangle of Sadness opened in 10 locations in Los Angeles, New York and San Francisco to a debut of $210,074, for a per theatre average of $21,007. In its second weekend, it grossed $657,051 on 31 screens. In its third weekend, it grossed $600,000 on 280 screens, finishing tenth at the box office. In its fourth weekend, it grossed $548,999 on 610 screens, dropping out of the box office top ten.

=== Critical response ===
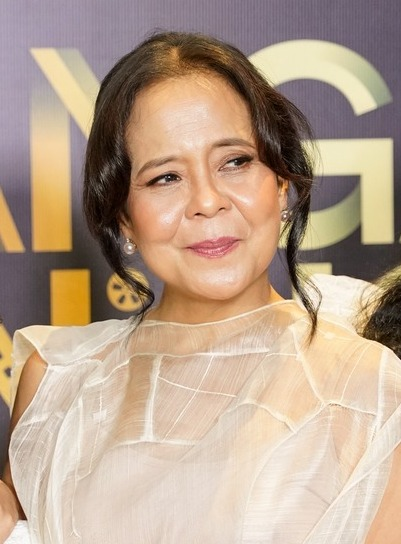
Dolly de Leon's performance garnered critical acclaim.

On the review aggregator website Rotten Tomatoes, 71% of 280 critics' reviews are positive, with an average rating of 7.2/10. The website's consensus reads: "Triangle of Sadness lacks the sharp edges of Östlund's earlier work, but this blackly humorous swipe at the obscenely affluent has its own rewards." Metacritic, which uses a weighted average, assigned the film a score of 63 out of 100, based on 47 critics, indicating "generally favorable" reviews.

Alysha Prasad of One Room With A View called it "Utterly unhinged in the best way possible, guaranteed to elicit enough laughter to make your stomach ache, while also leaving you with plenty to think about afterwards." David Kaplan of Kaplan vs. Kaplan praised the ensemble cast as "completely compelling, even if some of the characters are unsavory." Aaron Neuwirth of We Live Entertainment described it as containing "what’s likely the grossest set piece I’ve seen in a movie awarded the Palme d’Or at the Cannes Film Festival." Gabi Zeitsman of Channel 24 (South Africa) commented, "if you loved White Lotus and satire aimed at the beautiful and rich, this is a definite must-watch. The fact that it won the Palme d'Or is in itself almost satirical..." "Don't go in expecting art-house intellectualism," wrote Kyle Smith of the Wall Street Journal, "The movie is as loaded with fun as it is with social implications." Paul Byrnes of the Sydney Morning Herald commented, "For Östlund, subtlety is overrated. Triangle of Sadness shows us why he has a point. It’s a spectacular demolition of modern life, a disruptor movie full of ideas and nuance, as violent in its way as a Pieter Bruegel painting." Kevin Maher of The Times detected more nuance in the film, however, stating: "Yes, the metaphor can seem very on-the-nose: the super rich, in this economic climate especially, are obscene and repulsive! But it's a film of great subtlety (really) and benefits from multiple viewings."

Richard Brody, in a critical review for The New Yorker, described Triangle of Sadness as "a movie of targeted demagogy that pitches its facile political stances to the preconceptions of the art-house audience; far from deepening those ideas or challenging those assumptions, it flatters the like-minded viewership while swaggering with the filmmaker’s presumption of freethinking, subversive audacity." Brody described Östlund's direction as "precise but stiff" and criticised the film's emphasis on social commentary: "[Östlund's] keen observations are submerged in his efforts at social criticism and political philosophy." However, Brody commended the cast performances—particularly Dean's, of which he wrote: "If nothing else, the movie would have assured her stardom; there’s no telling how many characters and films her death foreclosed before their conception."

Filmmaker Edgar Wright praised the film, saying that it "has plenty to say about the obscene gap in the living wage but is also smart and witty entertainment, brilliantly structured, perfectly performed and masterfully directed to create a purely theatrical experience from start to end."

In 2023, MovieWeb ranked it number 10 on its list of "20 Movies That Require Your Full Attention From Start to Finish," writing "If you are a fan of movies that tell its story through multiple parts or take a drastic turn in direction but also include a wicked sense of humor, then Triangle of Sadness is for you ... This film has such an unpredictable, disgusting, over-the-top hilarious change in direction that if you stop paying attention for even a second, you will probably question if the same movie is still playing."

In 2025, filmmaker Sean Baker and actress Naomi Ackie both cited the film as among their favourites of the 21st century.

=== Accolades ===
Award	Date of ceremony	Category	Recipient(s)	Result	Ref.
Cannes Film Festival	May 28, 2022	Palme d'Or	Ruben Östlund	Won	
Cannes Film Festival	May 28, 2022	AFCAE Art House Cinema Award	Ruben Östlund	Won	
European Film Awards	December 10, 2022	Best Film	Triangle of Sadness	Won	
European Film Awards	December 10, 2022	Best Director	Ruben Östlund	Won	
European Film Awards	December 10, 2022	Best Screenwriter	Ruben Östlund	Won	
European Film Awards	December 10, 2022	Best Actor	Zlatko Burić	Won	
European Film Awards	December 10, 2022	European University Film Award	Triangle of Sadness	Nominated	
Los Angeles Film Critics Association	December 11, 2022	Best Supporting Performer	Dolly de Leon	Won	
Capri Hollywood International Film Festival	2 January 2023	Best European Director	Ruben Östlund	Won	
Alliance of Women Film Journalists	5 January 2023	Best Ensemble Cast – Casting Director	Pauline Hansson	Nominated	
National Society of Film Critics	January 7, 2023	Best Supporting Actress	Dolly de Leon	3rd place	
Belgian Film Critics Association	8 January 2023	Grand Prix	Triangle of Sadness	Nominated	
San Francisco Bay Area Film Critics Circle	January 9, 2023	Best Supporting Actress	Dolly de Leon	Nominated	
Golden Globe Awards	January 10, 2023	Best Motion Picture – Musical or Comedy	Triangle of Sadness	Nominated	
Golden Globe Awards	January 10, 2023	Best Supporting Actress – Motion Picture	Dolly de Leon	Nominated	
Critics' Choice Movie Awards	January 15, 2023	Best Comedy	Triangle of Sadness	Nominated	
Online Film Critics Society	January 23, 2023	Best Supporting Actress	Dolly de Leon	Nominated	
Guldbagge Awards	January 23, 2023	Best Film	Erik Hemmendorff and Philippe Bober	Won	
Guldbagge Awards	January 23, 2023	Best Director	Ruben Östlund	Won	
Guldbagge Awards	January 23, 2023	Best Actor in a Supporting Role	Zlatko Burić	Won	
Guldbagge Awards	January 23, 2023	Best Actress in a Supporting Role	Dolly de Leon	Won	
Guldbagge Awards	January 23, 2023	Best Screenplay	Ruben Östlund	Nominated	
Guldbagge Awards	January 23, 2023	Best Costume Design	Sofie Krunegård	Won	
Guldbagge Awards	January 23, 2023	Best Set Design	Josefin Åsberg	Nominated	
Guldbagge Awards	January 23, 2023	Best Makeup	Stefanie Gredig	Won	
Guldbagge Awards	January 23, 2023	Best Visual Effects	Peter Hjorth, Peter Toggeth Karlsson, Ludwig Källén and Vincent Larsson	Nominated	
London Film Critics' Circle	February 5, 2023	Supporting Actress of the Year	Dolly de Leon	Nominated	
London Film Critics' Circle	February 5, 2023	British/Irish Actor of the Year (for body of work)	Harris Dickinson	Nominated	
Vancouver Film Critics Circle	February 13, 2023	Best Supporting Actress	Dolly de Leon	Nominated	
British Academy Film Awards	February 19, 2023	Best Actress in a Supporting Role	Dolly de Leon	Nominated	
British Academy Film Awards	February 19, 2023	Best Original Screenplay	Ruben Östlund	Nominated	
British Academy Film Awards	February 19, 2023	Best Casting	Pauline Hansson	Nominated	
César Awards	February 24, 2023	Best Foreign Film	Triangle of Sadness	Nominated	
Cinema for Peace Awards	24 February 2023	Cinema for Peace Dove for The Most Valuable Film of the Year 2023	Triangle of Sadness	Nominated	
Hollywood Critics Association Awards	February 24, 2023	Best Comedy	Triangle of Sadness	Nominated	
AACTA International Awards	February 24, 2023	Best Supporting Actor	Woody Harrelson	Nominated	
AACTA International Awards	February 24, 2023	Best Screenplay	Ruben Östlund	Nominated	
Golden Reel Awards	February 26, 2023	Outstanding Achievement in Sound Editing – Foreign Language Feature	Andreas Franck, Bent Holm, Gustav Landbecker, Johannes Dekko, Claes Lundberg, Benny Persson, Daniel Lindvik, Alexander Wunsch, Erik Watland, Ulf Olausson	Nominated	
Satellite Awards	March 3, 2023	Best Motion Picture – Comedy or Musical	Triangle of Sadness	Nominated	
Satellite Awards	March 3, 2023	Best Supporting Actress	Dolly de Leon	Nominated	
Satellite Awards	March 3, 2023	Best Original Screenplay	Ruben Östlund	Nominated	
Academy Awards	March 12, 2023	Best Picture	Erik Hemmendorff, Philippe Bober	Nominated	
Academy Awards	March 12, 2023	Best Director	Ruben Östlund	Nominated	
Academy Awards	March 12, 2023	Best Original Screenplay	Ruben Östlund	Nominated	
