= Los Angeles Film Critics Association Award for Best Supporting Performance =

Annual US film award

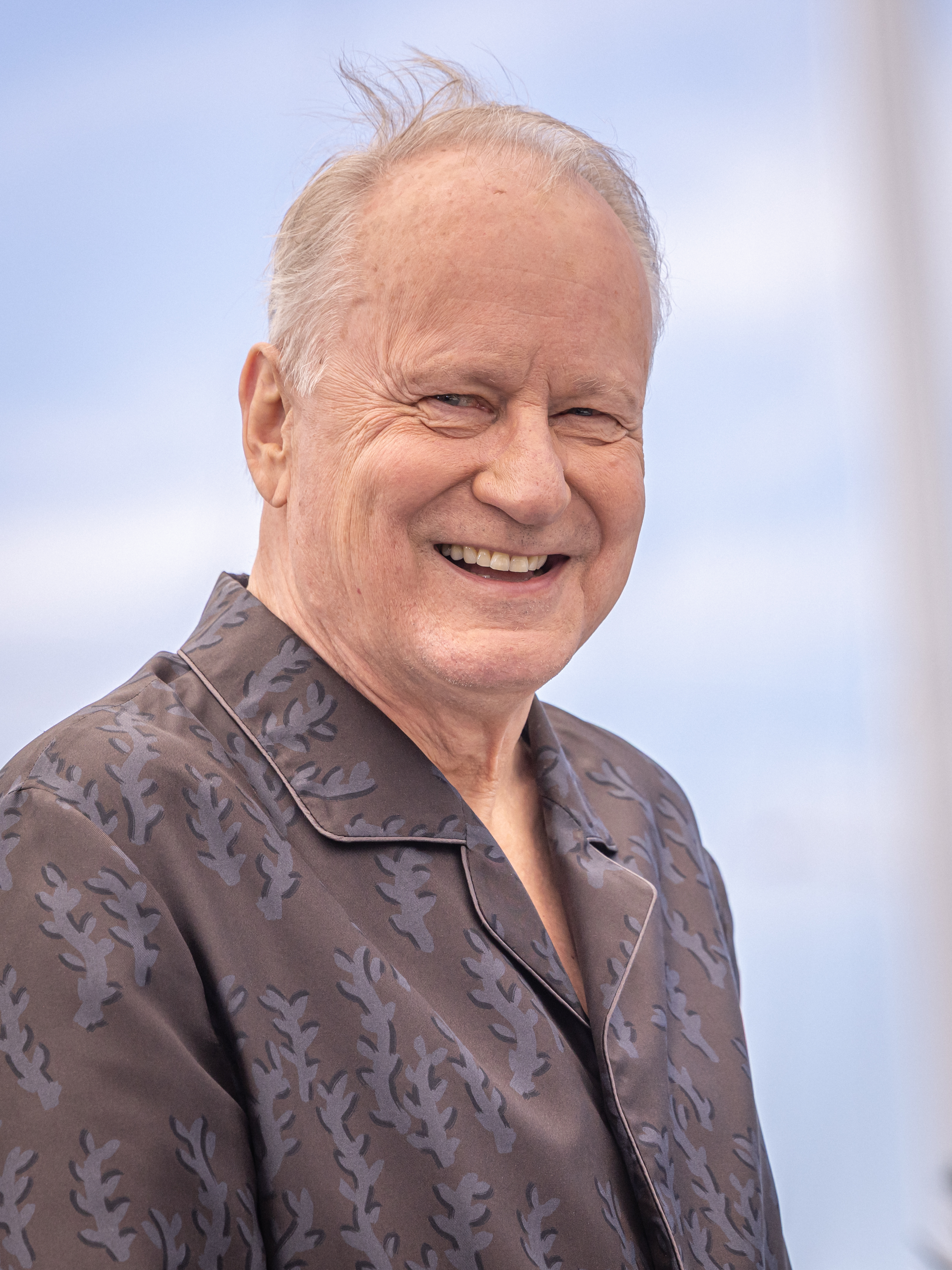
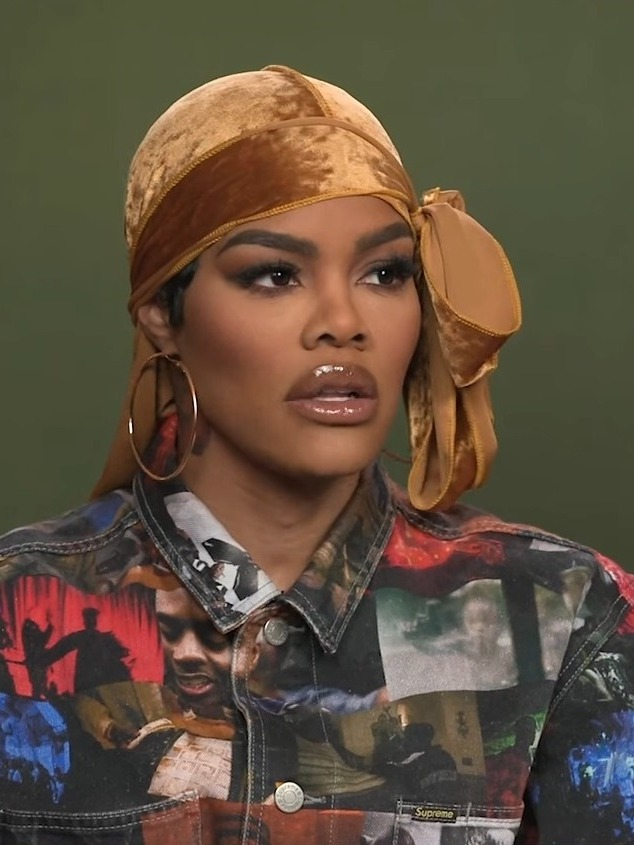
- The 2025 recipients: Stellan Skarsgård (left); Teyana Taylor (right)
- Awarded for: Best Performance by an Actor or an Actress in a Supporting Role
- Country: United States
- Presented by: Los Angeles Film Critics Association
- First award: Dolly de Leon – Triangle of Sadness; Ke Huy Quan – Everything Everywhere All at Once (2022)
- Currently held by: Stellan Skarsgård – Sentimental Value; Teyana Taylor – One Battle After Another (2025)
- Website: lafca.net

The Los Angeles Film Critics Association Award for Best Supporting Performance is an award given annually by the Los Angeles Film Critics Association. It was first introduced in 2022, after it was announced that the four acting categories would be retired and replaced with two gender neutral categories, with both Best Supporting Actor and Best Supporting Actress merging into the Best Supporting Performance category. Two awards for Best Supporting Performance and two awards for Best Lead Performance, each with two winners and two runners-up, are handed out.

== Winners and runners-up ==
=== 2020s ===
Year	Winner(s)	Film(s)	Role(s)
2022	Dolly de Leon	Triangle of Sadness	Abigail
2022	Ke Huy Quan	Everything Everywhere All at Once	Waymond Wang
2022	Jessie Buckley	Women Talking	Mariche
2022	Brian Tyree Henry	Causeway	James Aucoin
2023	Rachel McAdams	Are You There God? It's Me, Margaret.	Barbara Simon
2023	Da'Vine Joy Randolph	The Holdovers	Mary Lamb
2023	Lily Gladstone	Killers of the Flower Moon	Mollie Burkhart
2023	Ryan Gosling	Barbie	Ken
2024	Yura Borisov	Anora	Igor
2024	Kieran Culkin	A Real Pain	Benji Kaplan
2024	Clarence Maclin	Sing Sing	Himself
2024	Adam Pearson	A Different Man	Oswald
2025	Stellan Skarsgård	Sentimental Value	Gustav Borg
2025	Teyana Taylor	One Battle After Another	Perfidia Beverly Hills
2025	Inga Ibsdotter Lilleaas	Sentimental Value	Agnes Borg Pettersen
2025	Andrew Scott	Blue Moon	Richard Rodgers

== See also ==
- Gotham Independent Film Award for Outstanding Supporting Performance
- Independent Spirit Award for Best Supporting Performance
- National Board of Review Award for Best Supporting Actor
- National Board of Review Award for Best Supporting Actress
- National Society of Film Critics Award for Best Supporting Actor
- National Society of Film Critics Award for Best Supporting Actress
- New York Film Critics Circle Award for Best Supporting Actor
- New York Film Critics Circle Award for Best Supporting Actress
