= 2022 Los Angeles Film Critics Association Awards =

Annual US film awards ceremony

48th LAFCA Awards
- Date: December 11, 2022

Highlights
- Best Picture: Everything Everywhere All at Once / Tár (TIE)

The 48th Los Angeles Film Critics Association Awards, given by the Los Angeles Film Critics Association (LAFCA), honored the best in film for 2022. Both Everything Everywhere All at Once and Tár received the award for Best Film, being the fourth time the association gave the award to two films in the same year. For the first time in three years, the association held an in-person awards event where all the winners were honored on January 14, 2023.

This year, LAFCA introduced gender-neutral acting categories, with two awards for Best Lead Performance and two awards for Best Supporting Performance, each with two winners and two runner-ups.

== Winners ==
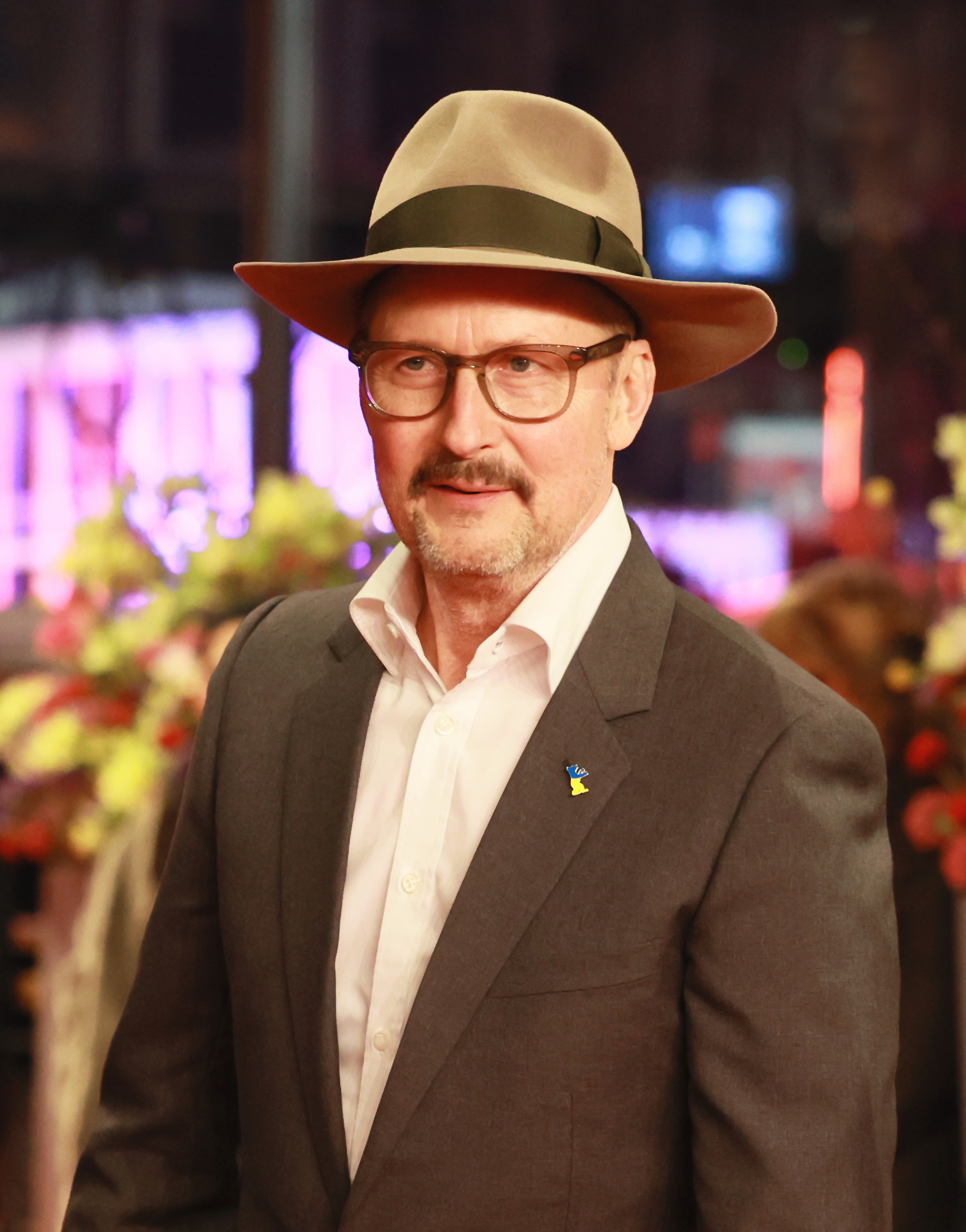
Todd Field, Best Director and Best Screenplay winner

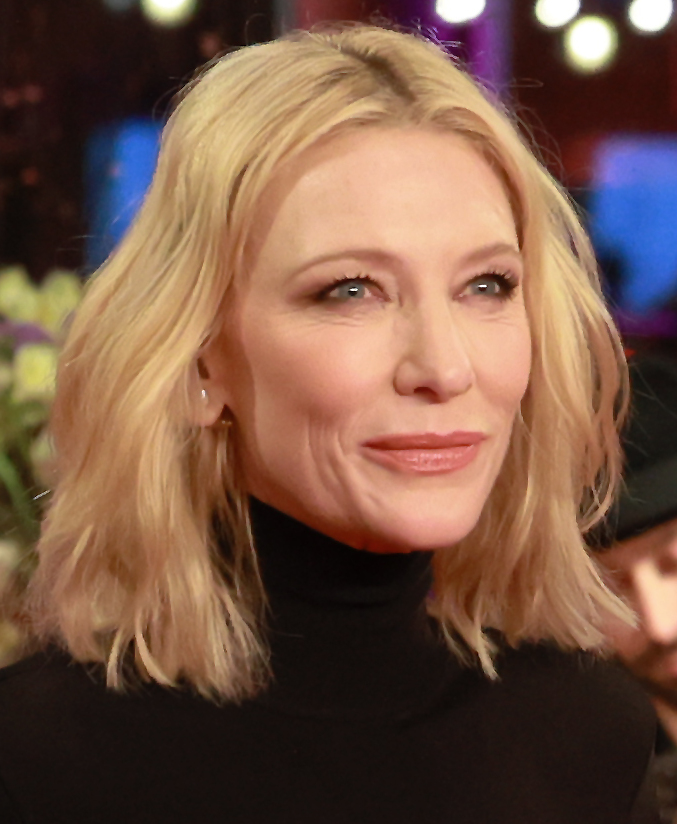
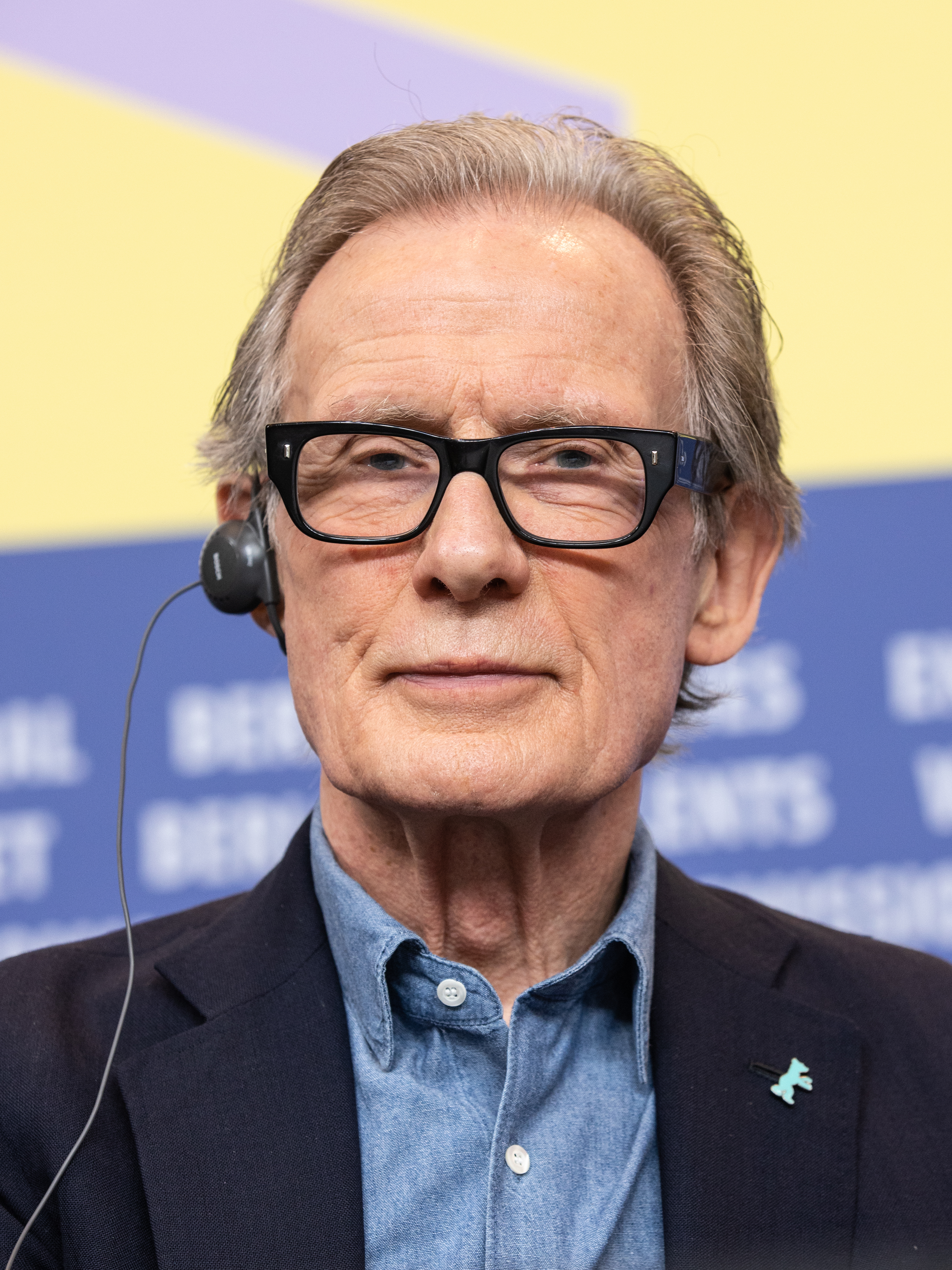
Cate Blanchett and Bill Nighy, Best Lead Performance winners
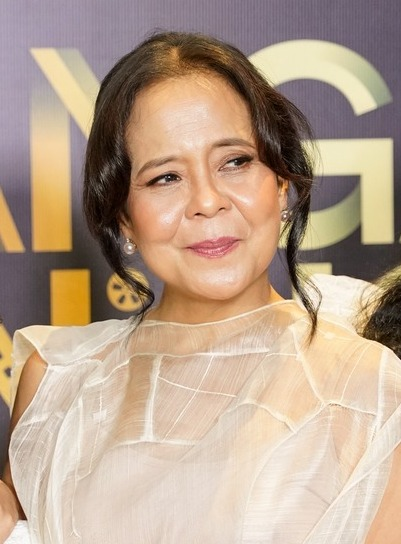
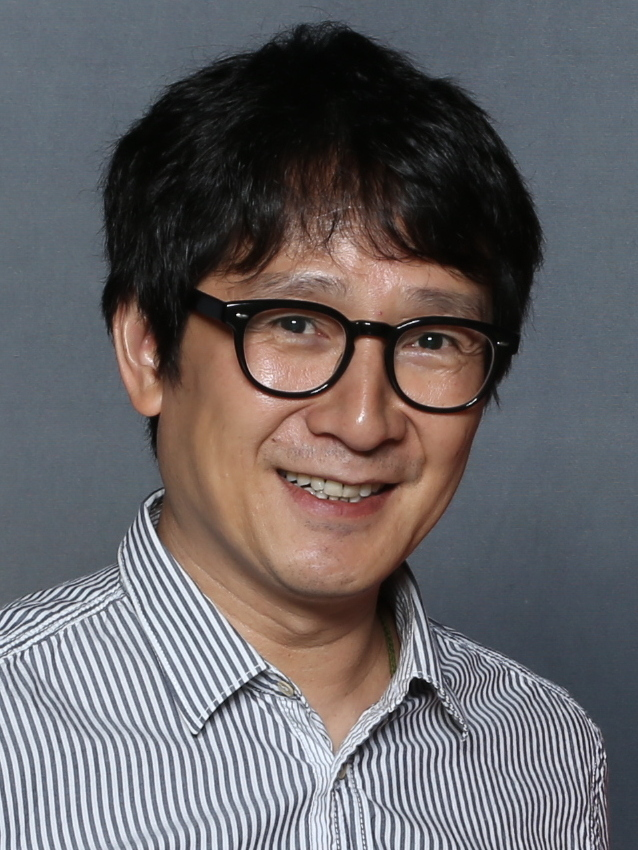
Dolly de Leon and Ke Huy Quan, Best Supporting Performance winners
- Best Film (TIE):
  - Everything Everywhere All at Once
  - Tár
- Best Director:
  - Todd Field – Tár
    - Runner-up: S. S. Rajamouli – RRR
- Best Lead Performance:
  - Cate Blanchett – Tár
  - Bill Nighy – Living
    - Runner-up: Danielle Deadwyler – Till
    - Runner-up: Michelle Yeoh – Everything Everywhere All at Once
- Best Supporting Performance:
  - Dolly de Leon – Triangle of Sadness
  - Ke Huy Quan – Everything Everywhere All at Once
    - Runner-up: Jessie Buckley – Women Talking
    - Runner-up: Brian Tyree Henry – Causeway
- Best Screenplay:
  - Todd Field – Tár
    - Runner-up: Martin McDonagh – The Banshees of Inisherin
- Best Cinematography:
  - Michał Dymek – EO
    - Runner-up: Hoyte van Hoytema – Nope
- Best Editing:
  - Blair McClendon – Aftersun
    - Runner-up: Monika Willi – Tár
- Best Music Score:
  - M. M. Keeravani – RRR
    - Runner-up: Paweł Mykietyn – EO
- Best Production Design:
  - Dylan Cole and Ben Procter – Avatar: The Way of Water
    - Runner-up: Jason Kisvarday – Everything Everywhere All at Once
- Best Foreign Language Film:
  - EO
    - Runner-up: Saint Omer
- Best Documentary/Non-Fiction Film:
  - All the Beauty and the Bloodshed
    - Runner-up: Fire of Love
- Best Animation:
  - Guillermo del Toro's Pinocchio
    - Runner-up: Marcel the Shell with Shoes On
- New Generation Award:
  - Davy Chou and Park Ji-min – Return to Seoul
- Career Achievement Award:
  - Claire Denis
- The Douglas Edwards Experimental/Independent Film/Video Award:
  - De Humani Corporis Fabrica
- Special Citation:
  - Gwen Deglise (for her curation and celebration of cinema in Los Angeles for a quarter-century through the American Cinematheque)
