= Verdict (2019 film) =

2019 film

- Theatrical release poster
- Directed by: Raymund Ribay Gutierrez
- Screenplay by: Raymund Ribay Gutierrez
- Produced by: Brillante Ma. Mendoza
- Starring: Max Eigenmann; Kristoffer King
- Cinematography: Joshua Reyles
- Edited by: Diego Marx Dobles
- Music by: Diwa de Leon
- Production companies: Centerstage Productions; Films Boutique Production; Playtime
- Distributed by: Centerstage Productions
- Release date: August 28, 2019 (Venice)
- Running time: 126 minutes
- Country: Philippines
- Language: Filipino

Verdict is a 2019 Philippine crime drama film directed by Raymund Ribay Gutierrez. It was selected as the Philippine entry for the Best International Feature Film at the 92nd Academy Awards, but it was not nominated.

== Plot ==
A wife seeks justice after she and her daughter are victims of domestic abuse.

== Cast ==
- Max Eigenmann as Joy Santos
- Kristoffer King as Dante Santos
- Jordhen Suan as Angel Santos
- Dolly de Leon as Elsa
- Rene Durian as Judge

== Release ==
Verdict was screened from September 5 to 15, 2019 as part of the Toronto International Film Festival. The film was screened in select cinemas in the Philippines from September 13 to 19, 2019 as part of the Pista ng Pelikulang Pilipino film festival.

== Reception ==
The film received the special jury prize (Horizons) at the 2019 Venice Film Festival and was the only Southeast Asian film to feature in the film festival. On Rotten Tomatoes, the film has an approval of 100% based on 10 reviews.

== See also ==
- List of submissions to the 92nd Academy Awards for Best International Feature Film
- List of Philippine submissions for the Academy Award for Best International Feature Film
