= Vicki Berlin =

Danish actress (born 1977)

Vicki Berlin Tarp
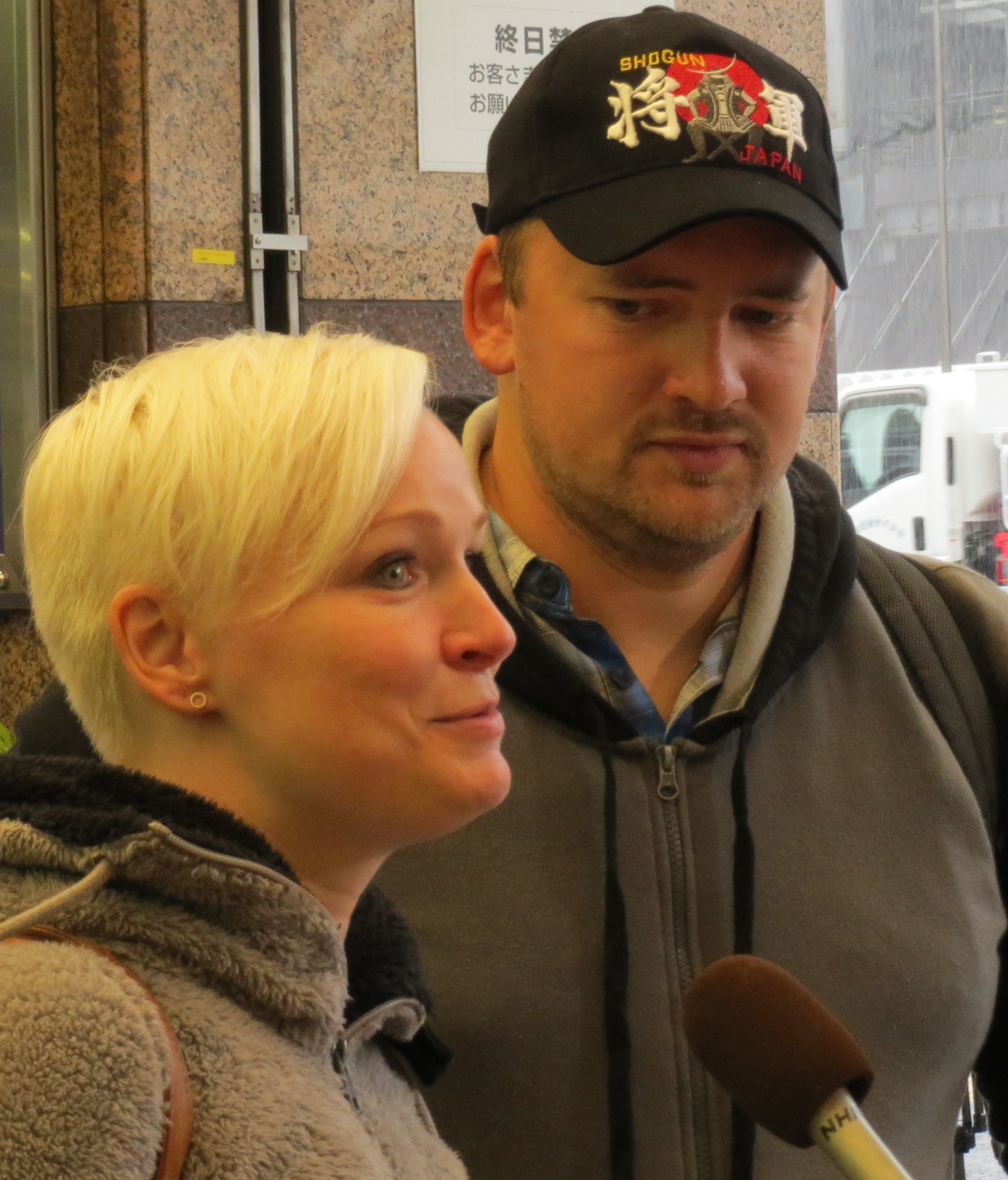
- Berlin with Nikolaj Tarp in Japan October 2014
- Born: Vicki Jensen; 16 November 1977 (age 48); Helsingør
- Occupation: Actress
- Years active: 2000–present

Vicki Berlin Tarp (born Vicki Jensen on 16 November 1977 in Helsingør) is a Danish actress, best known for her roles in Anja og Viktor – i medgang og modgang (2008) and Triangle of Sadness (2022).

== Filmography ==
=== Film ===
- Anja og Viktor - i medgang og modgang (2008) – Producer
- Hemmeligheder (2009, short)
- Triangle of Sadness (2022) - Paula
- Pinocchio: Carved From Darkness (TBA) - Nancy

=== Television ===
- Forbrydelsen, episode 16, (2007) – TV-speaker (voice only)
- Sommer, episode 16 (2008) – Receptionist
- Lærkevej, episode 7 (2009) – Lene
- Carmen og Colombo (2011) – Gitte
- Sleep In (2000)
