= Los Angeles Film Critics Association Award for Best Supporting Actress =

Award given annually by the Los Angeles Film Critics Association

- Awarded for: Best Performance by an Actress in a Supporting Role
- Country: United States
- Presented by: Los Angeles Film Critics Association
- First award: Vanessa Redgrave; Julia (1977)
- Final award: Ariana DeBose; West Side Story (2021)
- Website: lafca.net

The Los Angeles Film Critics Association Award for Best Supporting Actress was an award given annually by the Los Angeles Film Critics Association. It was first introduced in 1977 to reward the best performance by a supporting actress. In 2022, it was announced that the four acting categories would be retired and replaced with two gender neutral categories, with both Best Supporting Actor and Best Supporting Actress merging into the Best Supporting Performance category.

== Winners ==
=== 1970s ===
Year	Winner	Film	Role
1977	Vanessa Redgrave	Julia	Julia
1978	Maureen Stapleton	Interiors	Pearl
1978	Mona Washbourne	Stevie	Aunt
1979	Meryl Streep	Kramer vs. Kramer	Joanna Kramer
1979	Meryl Streep	Manhattan	Jill Davis
1979	Meryl Streep	The Seduction of Joe Tynan	Karen Traynor

=== 1980s ===
Year	Winner	Film	Role
1980	Mary Steenburgen	Melvin and Howard	Lynda Dummar
1981	Maureen Stapleton	Reds	Emma Goldman
1982	Glenn Close	The World According to Garp	Jenny Fields
1983	Linda Hunt	The Year of Living Dangerously	Billy Kwan
1984	Peggy Ashcroft	A Passage to India	Mrs. Moore
1985	Anjelica Huston	Prizzi's Honor	Maerose Prizzi
1986	Cathy Tyson	Mona Lisa	Simone
1986	Dianne Wiest	Hannah and Her Sisters	Holly
1987	Olympia Dukakis	Moonstruck	Rose Castorini
1988	Geneviève Bujold	Dead Ringers	Claire Niveau
1988	Geneviève Bujold	The Moderns	Libby Valentin
1989	Brenda Fricker	My Left Foot	Mrs. Brown

=== 1990s ===
Year	Winner	Film	Role
1990	Lorraine Bracco	Goodfellas	Karen Hill
1991	Jane Horrocks	Life Is Sweet	Nicola
1992	Judy Davis	Husbands and Wives	Sally Simmons
1993	Anna Paquin	The Piano	Flora McGrath
1993	Rosie Perez	Fearless	Carla Rodrigo
1994	Dianne Wiest	Bullets Over Broadway	Helen Sinclair
1995	Joan Allen	Nixon	Pat Nixon
1996	Barbara Hershey	The Portrait of a Lady	Madame Serena Merle
1997	Julianne Moore	Boogie Nights	Amber Waves
1998	Joan Allen	Pleasantville	Betty Parker
1999	Chloë Sevigny	Boys Don't Cry	Lana Tisdel

=== 2000s ===
Year	Winner	Film	Role
2000	Frances McDormand	Almost Famous	Elaine Miller
2000	Frances McDormand	Wonder Boys	Sara Gaskell
2001	Kate Winslet	Iris	Iris Murdoch (young)
2002	Edie Falco	Sunshine State	Marly Temple
2003	Shohreh Aghdashloo	House of Sand and Fog	Nadereh "Nadi" Behrani
2004	Virginia Madsen	Sideways	Maya Randall
2005	Catherine Keener	The 40-Year-Old Virgin	Trish Piedmont
2005	Catherine Keener	The Ballad of Jack and Rose	Kathleen
2005	Catherine Keener	Capote	Nelle Harper Lee
2005	Catherine Keener	The Interpreter	Dot Woods
2006	Luminița Gheorghiu	The Death of Mr. Lazarescu (Moartea domnului Lăzărescu)	Mioara Avram
2007	Amy Ryan	Before the Devil Knows You're Dead	Martha Hanson
2007	Amy Ryan	Gone Baby Gone	Helene McCready
2008	Penélope Cruz	Elegy	Consuela Castillo
2008	Penélope Cruz	Vicky Cristina Barcelona	María Elena
2009	Mo'Nique	Precious	Mary Lee Johnston

=== 2010s ===
Year	Winner	Film	Role
2010	Jacki Weaver	Animal Kingdom	Janine "Smurf" Cody
2011	Jessica Chastain	The Help	Celia Foote
2011	Jessica Chastain	Take Shelter	Samantha LaForche
2011	Jessica Chastain	The Tree of Life	Mrs. O'Brien
2012	Amy Adams	The Master	Peggy Dodd
2013	Lupita Nyong'o	12 Years a Slave	Patsey
2014	Agata Kulesza	Ida	Wanda Gruz
2015	Alicia Vikander	Ex Machina	Ava
2016	Lily Gladstone	Certain Women	Jamie
2017	Laurie Metcalf	Lady Bird	Marion McPherson
2018	Regina King	If Beale Street Could Talk	Sharon Rivers
2019	Jennifer Lopez	Hustlers	Ramona Vega

=== 2020s ===
Year	Winner	Film	Role
2020	Youn Yuh-jung	Minari	Soon-ja
2021	Ariana DeBose	West Side Story	Anita

== Multiple winners ==
2 wins

- Joan Allen (1995, 1998)
- Maureen Stapleton (1978, 1981)
- Dianne Wiest (1986, 1994)

== See also ==
- National Board of Review Award for Best Supporting Actress
- New York Film Critics Circle Award for Best Supporting Actress
- National Society of Film Critics Award for Best Supporting Actress
