= Los Angeles Film Critics Association Award for Best Lead Performance =

Annual US film award

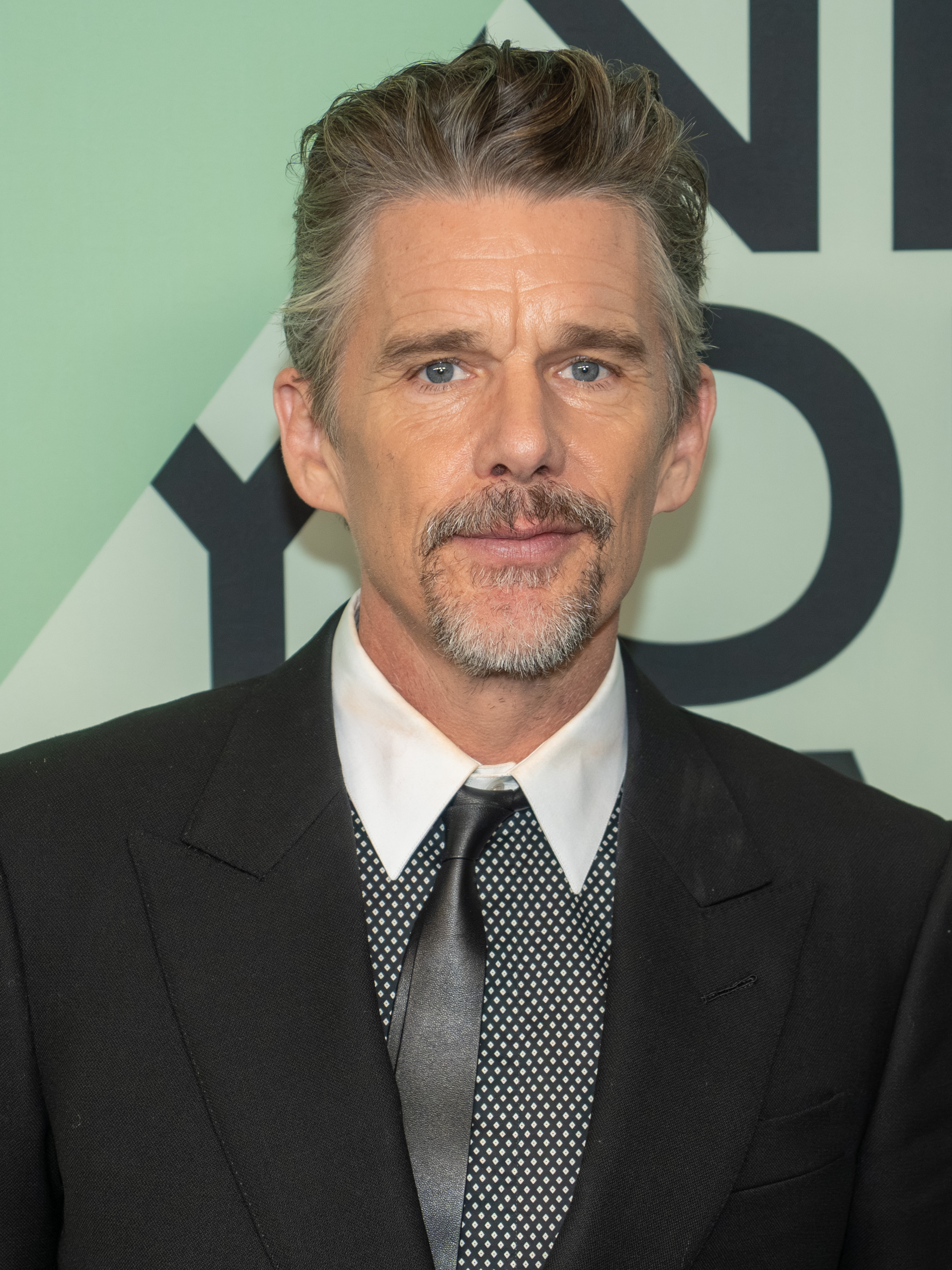
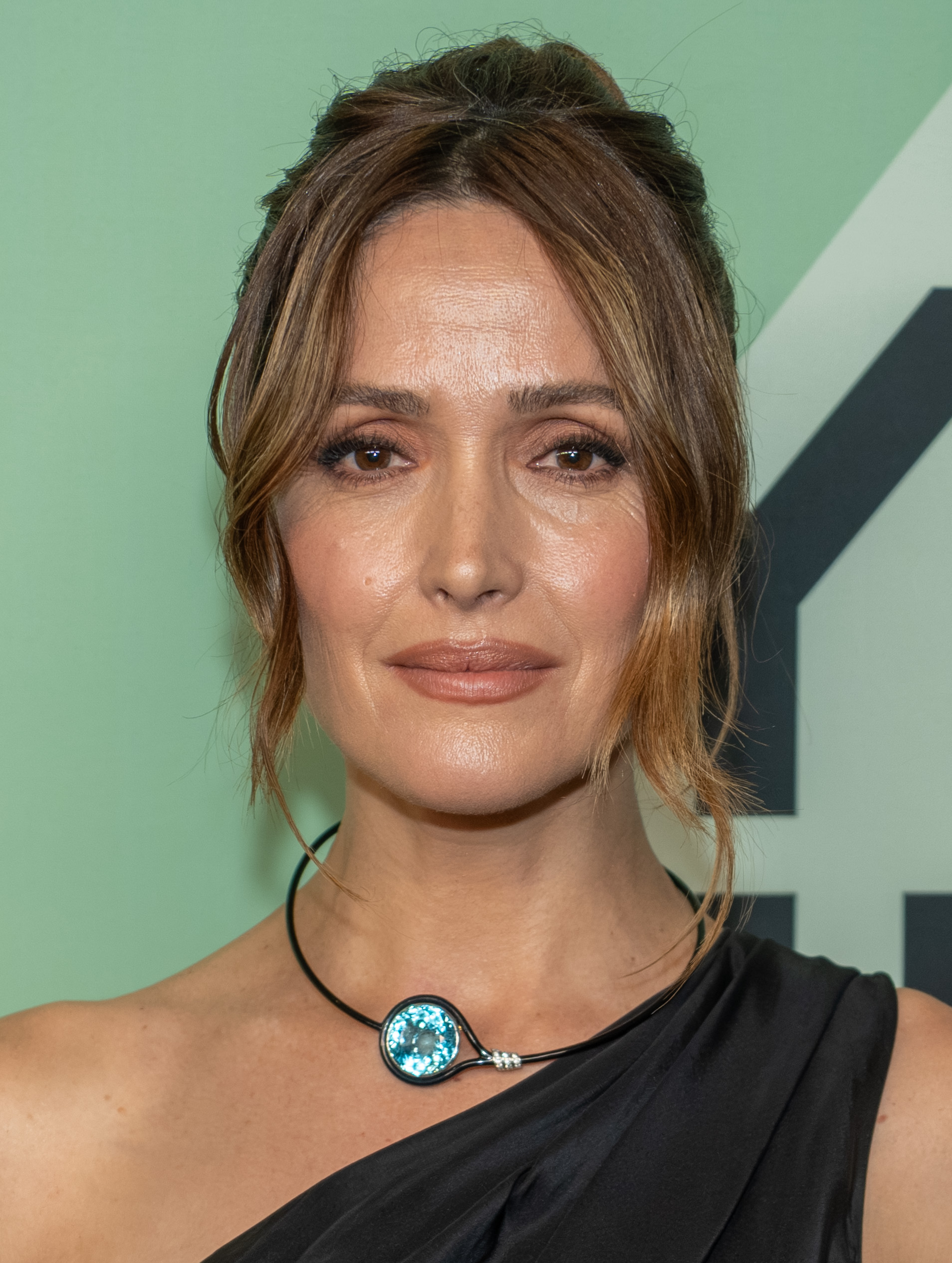
- The 2025 recipients: Ethan Hawke (left) and Rose Byrne (right)
- Awarded for: Best Performance by an Actor or an Actress in a Leading Role
- Country: United States
- Presented by: Los Angeles Film Critics Association
- First award: Cate Blanchett – Tár; Bill Nighy – Living (2022)
- Currently held by: Ethan Hawke – Blue Moon; Rose Byrne – If I Had Legs I'd Kick You (2025)
- Website: lafca.net

The Los Angeles Film Critics Association Award for Best Lead Performance is an award given annually by the Los Angeles Film Critics Association. It was first introduced in 2022, after it was announced that the four acting categories would be retired and replaced with two gender neutral categories, with both Best Actor and Best Actress merging into the Best Lead Performance category. Two awards for Best Lead Performance and two awards for Best Supporting Performance, each with two winners and two runners-up, are handed out.

== Winners and runners-up ==
- † = Winner of the Academy Award for Best Actor or Best Actress
- ‡ = Nominated for the Academy Award for Best Actor or Best Actress

=== 2020s ===
Year	Winner(s)	Film(s)	Role(s)
2022	Cate Blanchett	Tár	Lydia Tár ‡
2022	Bill Nighy	Living	Mr. Williams ‡
2022	Danielle Deadwyler	Till	Mamie Till-Mobley
2022	Michelle Yeoh	Everything Everywhere All at Once	Evelyn Wang †
2023	Sandra Hüller	Anatomy of a Fall	Sandra Voyter ‡
2023	Sandra Hüller	The Zone of Interest	Hedwig Höss
2023	Emma Stone	Poor Things	Bella Baxter †
2023	Andrew Scott	All of Us Strangers	Adam
2023	Jeffrey Wright	American Fiction	Thelonious "Monk" Ellison ‡
2024	Marianne Jean-Baptiste	Hard Truths	Pansey Deacon
2024	Mikey Madison	Anora	Anora "Ani" Mikheeva †
2024	Demi Moore	The Substance	Elisabeth Sparkle ‡
2024	Fernanda Torres	I'm Still Here	Eunice Paiva ‡
2025	Ethan Hawke	Blue Moon	Lorenz Hart
2025	Rose Byrne	If I Had Legs I'd Kick You	Linda
2025	Timothée Chalamet	Marty Supreme	Marty Mauser
2025	Wagner Moura	The Secret Agent	Armando

== See also ==
- Gotham Independent Film Award for Outstanding Lead Performance
- Independent Spirit Award for Best Lead Performance
- National Board of Review Award for Best Actor
- National Board of Review Award for Best Actress
- National Society of Film Critics Award for Best Actor
- National Society of Film Critics Award for Best Actress
- New York Film Critics Circle Award for Best Actor
- New York Film Critics Circle Award for Best Actress
