= 2025 Los Angeles Film Critics Association Awards =

American film awards

51st LAFCA Awards
- Date: December 7, 2025

Highlights
- Best Picture: One Battle After Another

The 51st Los Angeles Film Critics Association Awards, given by the Los Angeles Film Critics Association (LAFCA), honored the best in film for 2025. The awards were announced on December 7, 2025. Paul Thomas Anderson's action thriller One Battle After Another led the awards with three wins, including Best Film, Best Director and Best Supporting Performance (Teyana Taylor).

The winners were honored at the association's annual banquet in the Biltmore Hotel on January 10, 2026. On October 22, 2025, it was announced that American filmmaker Philip Kaufman would be honored with the Career Achievement Award.

== Winners ==
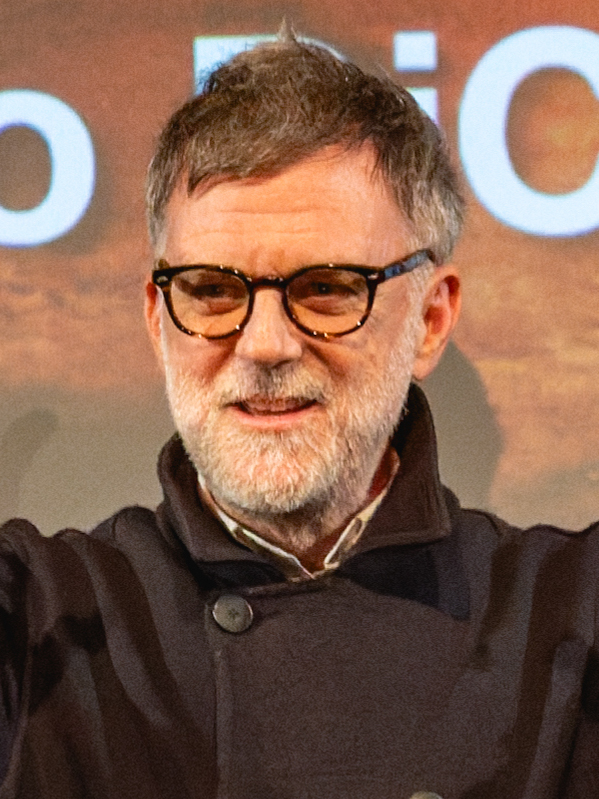
Paul Thomas Anderson, Best Director winner

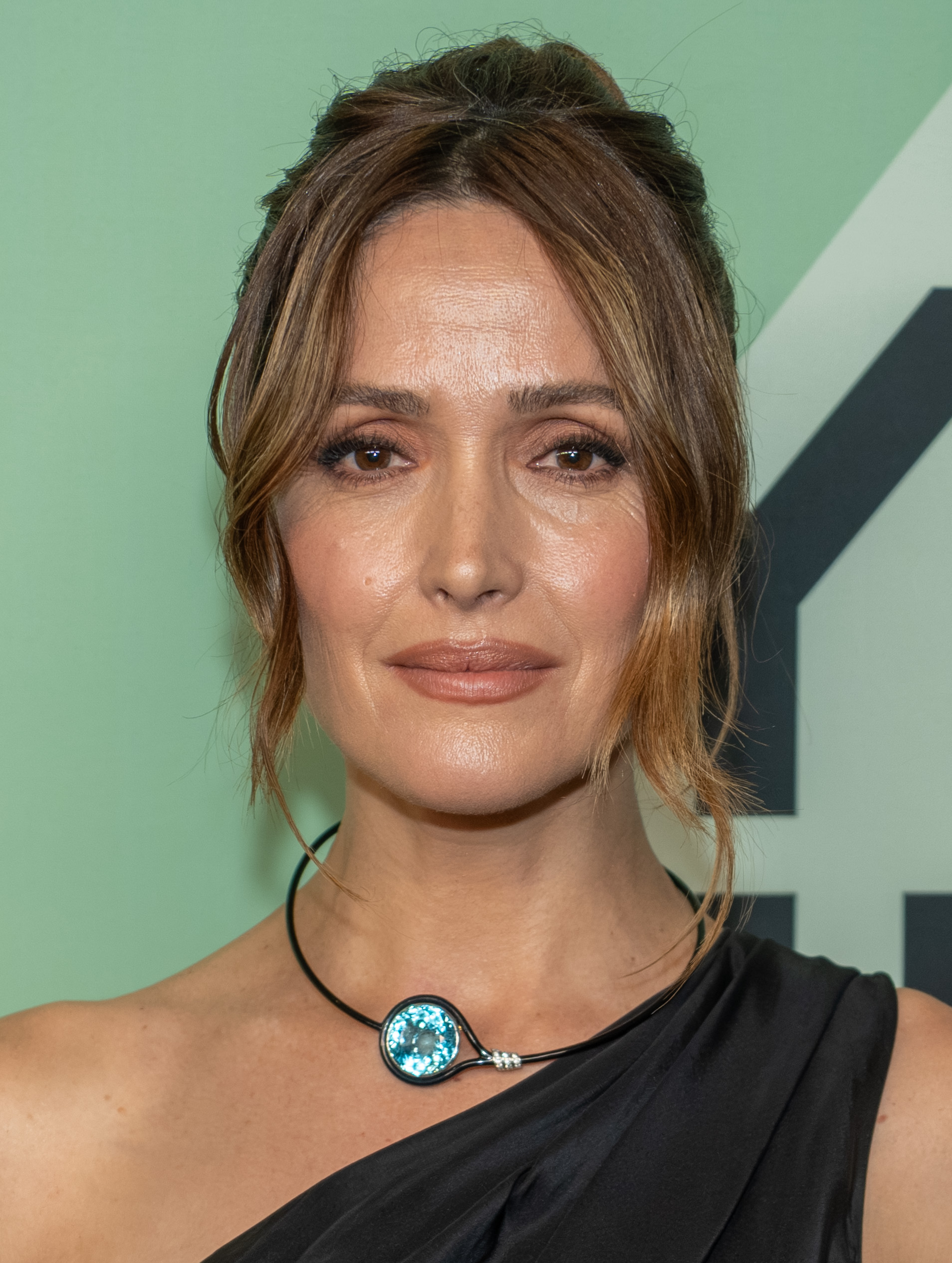
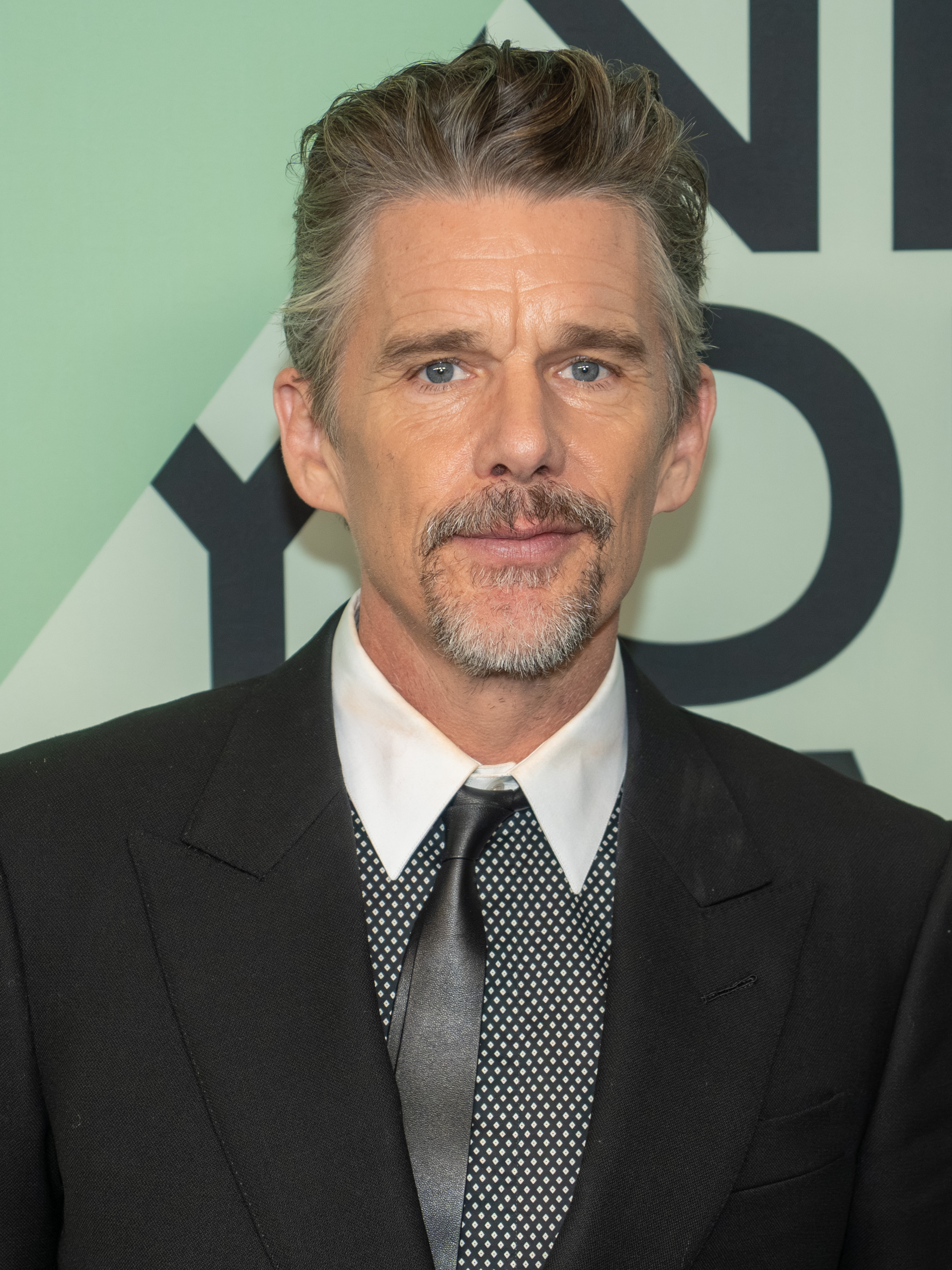
Rose Byrne and Ethan Hawke, Best Lead Performance winners
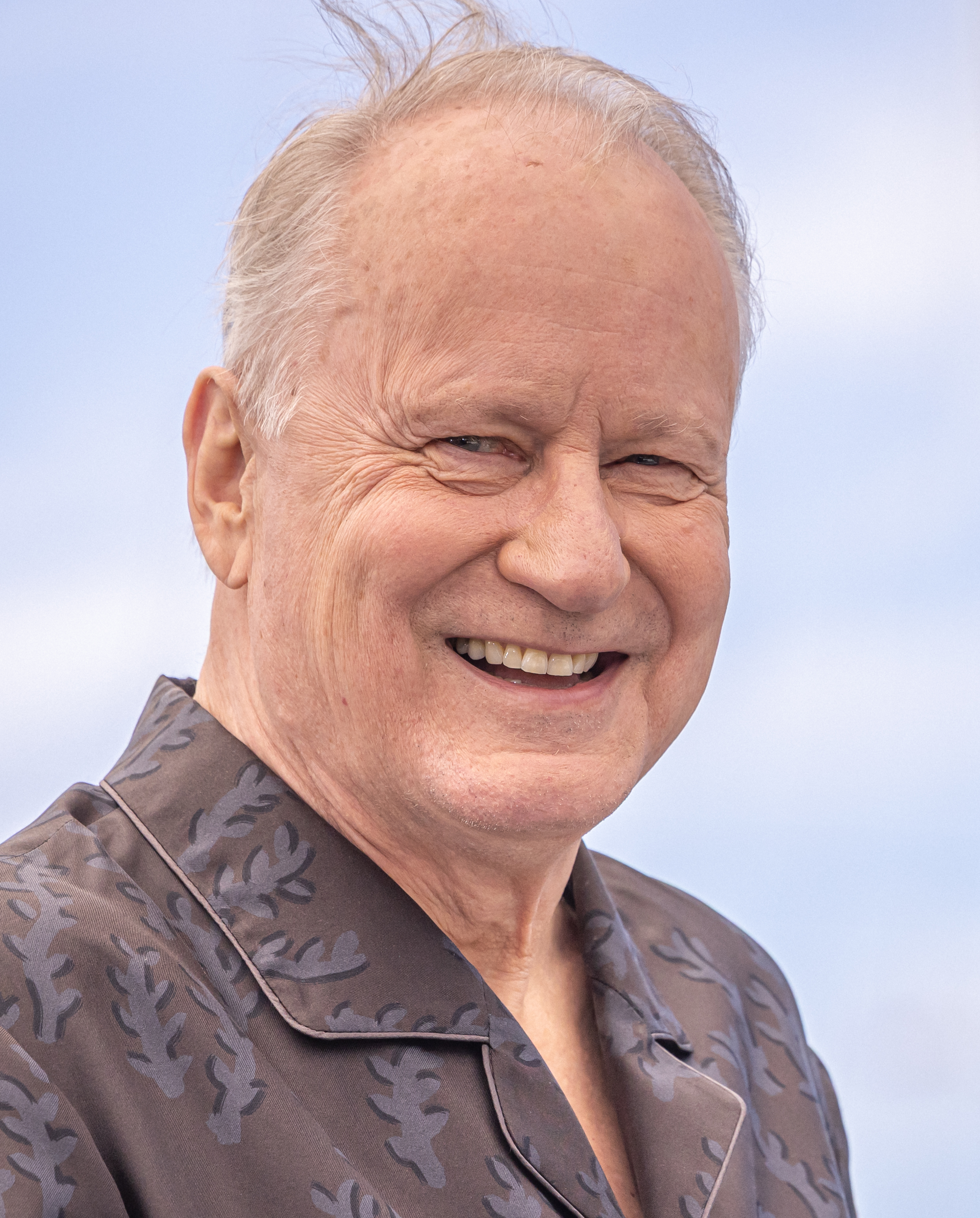
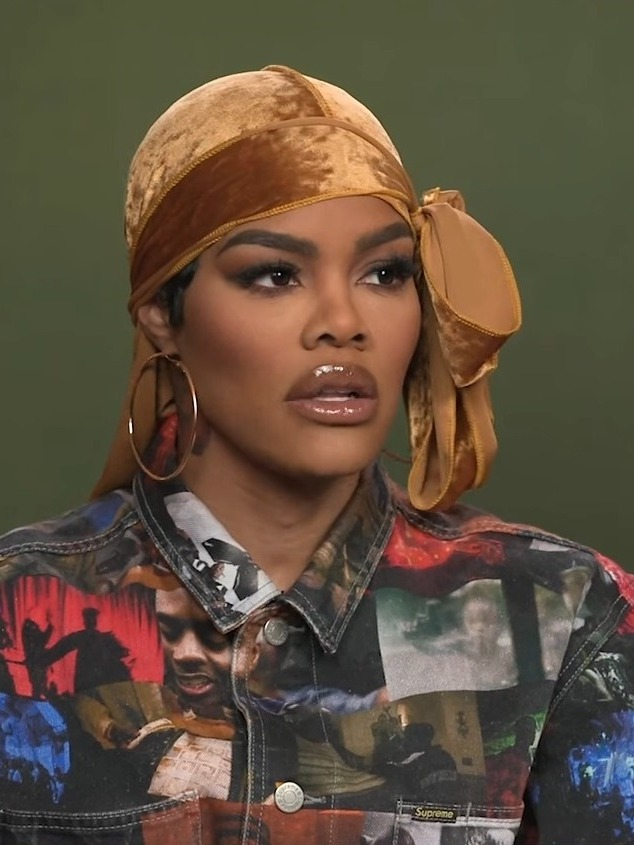
Stellan Skarsgård and Teyana Taylor, Best Supporting Performance winners
- Best Film:
  - One Battle After Another
    - Runner-up: The Secret Agent
- Best Director:
  - Paul Thomas Anderson – One Battle After Another
    - Runner-up: Ryan Coogler – Sinners
- Best Lead Performance:
  - Rose Byrne – If I Had Legs I'd Kick You
  - Ethan Hawke – Blue Moon
    - Runner-up: Timothée Chalamet – Marty Supreme
    - Runner-up: Wagner Moura – The Secret Agent
- Best Supporting Performance:
  - Stellan Skarsgård – Sentimental Value
  - Teyana Taylor – One Battle After Another
    - Runner-up: Inga Ibsdotter Lilleaas – Sentimental Value
    - Runner-up: Andrew Scott – Blue Moon
- Best Screenplay:
  - Jafar Panahi – It Was Just an Accident
    - Runner-up: Eva Victor – Sorry, Baby
- Best Cinematography:
  - Adolpho Veloso – Train Dreams
    - Runner-up: Autumn Durald Arkapaw – Sinners
- Best Editing:
  - Ronald Bronstein and Josh Safdie – Marty Supreme
    - Runner-up: Andy Jurgensen – One Battle After Another
- Best Music Score:
  - Kangding Ray – Sirāt
    - Runner-up: Ludwig Göransson – Sinners
- Best Production Design:
  - Hannah Beachler – Sinners
    - Runner-up: Tamara Deverell – Frankenstein
- Best Foreign Language Film:
  - The Secret Agent
    - Runner-up: It Was Just an Accident
- Best Documentary/Non-Fiction Film:
  - My Undesirable Friends: Part I — Last Air in Moscow
    - Runner-up: The Perfect Neighbor
- Best Animation:
  - Little Amélie or the Character of Rain
    - Runner-up: KPop Demon Hunters
- New Generation Award:
  - Eva Victor – Sorry, Baby
- Career Achievement Award:
  - Philip Kaufman
- The Douglas Edwards Experimental Film Award:
  - Albert Serra – Afternoons of Solitude
  - Thom Andersen (for his body of work)
- Special Citation:
  - Judy Kim of Gardena Cinema, a historic 800-seat, single-screen movie palace that has operated as an independent cinema and beacon of community since the Kim family took ownership in 1976
