= Los Angeles Film Critics Association =

American organization

- Abbreviation: LAFCA
- Formation: Febuary 2, 1976
- Type: Film criticism
- Location: Los Angeles, California
- Official language: English
- Website: lafca.net

The Los Angeles Film Critics Association (LAFCA) is an American film critic organization founded on February 2, 1976.

== Background ==
The Los Angeles Film Critics Association was formed following a meeting of 19 movie critics at Pip's restaurant in Beverly Hills on Feburary 2, 1976. Its membership comprised film critics from Los Angeles–based print, radio and television media. The founding critics were: Steve Arvin, KMPC; Jacoba Atlas, Los Angeles Free Press; John Barbour, KNBC-TV; Rona Barrett, ABC-TV; Ruth Batchelor, Los Angeles Free Press; Richard Cuskelly, Los Angeles Herald-Examiner; Charles Champlin, Los Angeles Times; Linda Gross, Los Angeles Times; Arthur Knight, The Hollywood Reporter; Robert Q. Lewis, KRLA; Ray Loynd, Los Angeles Herald-Examiner; Steve Mamber, KPFK; Joseph McBride, Variety; Todd McCarthy, The Hollywood Reporter; Art Murphy, Variety; Regis Philbin, KABC-TV; David Sheenan, KNXT-TV; Kevin Thomas, Los Angeles Times; and Chuck Walsh, KFWB. Batchelor was named president. The Los Angeles Herald-Examiner's Bridget Byrne also attended the meeting but walked out as she did not believe that the group should be formed. The group announced their first awards five weeks later at Pip's on February 24, 1976. Since the first awards, in December of each year, the organization votes on the Los Angeles Film Critics Association Awards, honoring members of the film industry who have excelled in their fields over the calendar year. These awards are presented each January. The LAFCA also honors industry veterans with its annual Career Achievement Award, and promising talent with its annual New Generation Award.

Todd McCarthy and Kevin Thomas are the only founding members still serving. Thomas has been president three times.

== Award ceremonies ==
Ceremony	Date	Best Film Winner
1st	February 24, 1976	Dog Day Afternoon (tie)
1st	February 24, 1976	One Flew Over the Cuckoo's Nest (tie)
2nd	December 21, 1976	Network (tie)
2nd	December 21, 1976	Rocky (tie)
3rd	December 19, 1977	Star Wars
4th	December 16, 1978	Coming Home
5th	December 15, 1979	Kramer vs. Kramer
6th	December 20, 1980	Raging Bull
7th	December 14, 1981	Atlantic City
8th	December 11, 1982	E.T. the Extra-Terrestrial
9th	December 17, 1983	Terms of Endearment
10th	December 5, 1984	Amadeus
11th	December 14, 1985	Brazil
12th	December 13, 1986	Hannah and Her Sisters
13th	December 19, 1987	Hope and Glory
14th	December 10, 1988	Little Dorrit
15th	December 16, 1989	Do the Right Thing
16th	December 16, 1990	Goodfellas
17th	December 14, 1991	Bugsy
18th	December 12, 1992	Unforgiven
19th	December 11, 1993	Schindler's List
20th	December 10, 1994	Pulp Fiction
21st	December 16, 1995	Leaving Las Vegas
22nd	December 16, 1996	Secrets & Lies
23rd	December 14, 1997	L.A. Confidential
24th	December 13, 1998	Saving Private Ryan
25th	December 11, 1999	The Insider
26th	December 17, 2000	Crouching Tiger, Hidden Dragon
27th	December 15, 2001	In the Bedroom
28th	December 15, 2002	About Schmidt
29th	January 7, 2004	American Splendor
30th	December 11, 2004	Sideways
31st	December 11, 2005	Brokeback Mountain
32nd	December 11, 2006	Letters from Iwo Jima
33rd	December 9, 2007	There Will Be Blood
34th	December 9, 2008	WALL-E
35th	December 14, 2009	The Hurt Locker
36th	December 12, 2010	The Social Network
37th	December 11, 2011	The Descendants
38th	December 9, 2012	Amour
39th	December 8, 2013	Gravity (tie)
39th	December 8, 2013	Her (tie)
40th	December 7, 2014	Boyhood
41st	December 6, 2015	Spotlight
42nd	December 4, 2016	Moonlight
43rd	December 3, 2017	Call Me by Your Name
44th	December 9, 2018	Roma
45th	December 8, 2019	Parasite
46th	December 20, 2020	Small Axe
47th	December 18, 2021	Drive My Car
48th	December 11, 2022	Everything Everywhere All at Once (tie)
48th	December 11, 2022	Tár (tie)
49th	December 10, 2023	The Zone of Interest
50th	December 8, 2024	Anora
51st	December 8, 2025	One Battle After Another

== Awards categories ==
- Best Film
- Best Director
- Best Lead Performance
- Best Supporting Performance
- Best Screenplay
- Best Cinematography
- Best Editing
- Best Music
- Best Production Design
- Best Foreign Language Film
- Best Documentary Film
- Best Animated Film
- New Generation Award
- Career Achievement Award
- The Douglas Edwards Experimental/Independent Film/Video Award

Former categories

- Best Actor
- Best Actress
- Best Supporting Actor
- Best Supporting Actress

== See also ==
- Trifecta (film awards)
- New York Film Critics Circle
- National Society of Film Critics
