= 1977 Los Angeles Film Critics Association Awards =

Annual US film awards ceremony

3rd LAFCA Awards
- Date: December 19, 1977

Highlights
- Best Picture: Star Wars

The 3rd Los Angeles Film Critics Association Awards, honoring the best in film for 1977, were announced on 19 December 1977 and given on 10 January 1978.

== Winners ==
- Best Picture:
  - Star Wars
- Best Director:
  - Herbert Ross – The Turning Point
- Best Actor:
  - Richard Dreyfuss – The Goodbye Girl
- Best Actress:
  - Shelley Duvall – 3 Women
- Best Supporting Actor:
  - Jason Robards – Julia
- Best Supporting Actress:
  - Vanessa Redgrave – Julia
- Best Screenplay:
  - Woody Allen and Marshall Brickman – Annie Hall
- Best Cinematography:
  - Douglas Slocombe – Julia
- Best Music Score:
  - John Williams – Star Wars
- Best Foreign Film:
  - That Obscure Object of Desire (Cet obscur objet du désir) • France/Spain
- New Generation Award:
  - Joan Micklin Silver
- Career Achievement Award:
  - King Vidor
- Special Citation:
  - Charles Gary Allison, for his initiative in organizing the production of Fraternity Row and thus opening a gateway into professional film production for advanced cinema students.
  - Barbara Kopple – Harlan County, U.S.A.
