= London Film Critics' Circle Award for Film of the Year =

British film award

- Presented by: London Film Critics' Circle
- Established: 1980
- First award: Apocalypse Now
- Currently held by: One Battle After Another (2026)

The Award for Film of the Year is the highest honour given by the London Film Critics' Circle.

== Winners and nominees ==
=== 1980s ===
Past winners are:

Year	Film	Director(s)	Producer(s)
1980 (1st)
1980 (1st)	Apocalypse Now	Francis Ford Coppola	Francis Ford Coppola
1981 (2nd)
1981 (2nd)	Chariots of Fire	Hugh Hudson	David Puttnam
1982 (3rd)
1982 (3rd)	Missing	Costa-Gavras	Edward Lewis, Mildred Lewis
1983 (4th)
1983 (4th)	The King of Comedy	Martin Scorsese	Arnon Milchan
1984 (5th)
1984 (5th)	Paris, Texas	Wim Wenders	Anatole Dauman and Don Guest
1985 (6th)
1985 (6th)	The Purple Rose of Cairo	Woody Allen	Robert Greenhut and Woody Allen
1986 (7th)
1986 (7th)	A Room with a View	James Ivory	Ismail Merchant and James Ivory
1987 (8th)
1987 (8th)	Hope and Glory	John Boorman	John Boorman
1988 (9th)
1988 (9th)	House of Games	David Mamet	Michael Hausman
1989 (10th)
1989 (10th)	Distant Voices, Still Lives	Terence Davies	Jennifer Howarth

=== 1990s ===
Year	Film	Director(s)	Producer(s)
1990 (11th)
1990 (11th)	Crimes and Misdemeanors	Woody Allen	Robert Greenhut
1991 (12th)
1991 (12th)	Thelma & Louise	Ridley Scott	Mimi Polk Gitlin
1992 (13th)
1992 (13th)	Unforgiven	Clint Eastwood	Clint Eastwood
1993 (14th)
1993 (14th)	The Piano	Jane Campion	Jan Chapman
1994 (15th)
1994 (15th)	Schindler's List	Steven Spielberg	Branko Lustig, Gerald R. Molen, Steven Spielberg
1995 (16th)
1995 (16th)	Babe	Chris Noonan	Bill Miller, George Miller and Doug Mitchell
1996 (17th)
1996 (17th)	Fargo	Joel Coen	Ethan Coen
1997 (18th)
1997 (18th)	L.A. Confidential	Curtis Hanson	Curtis Hanson, Arnon Milchan and Michael Nathanson
1998 (19th)
1998 (19th)	Saving Private Ryan	Steven Spielberg	Ian Bryce, Mark Gordon, Gary Levinsohn and Steven Spielberg
1998 (19th)	Boogie Nights	Paul Thomas Anderson	Paul Thomas Anderson, Lloyd Levin, John Lyons and JoAnne Sellar
1998 (19th)	Titanic	James Cameron	James Cameron and Jon Landau
1998 (19th)	The Ice Storm	Ang Lee	Ang Lee, Ted Hope and James Schamus
1998 (19th)	The Truman Show	Peter Weir	Scott Rudin, Andrew Niccol, Edward S. Feldman and Adam Schroeder
1999 (20th)
1999 (20th)	American Beauty	Sam Mendes	Bruce Cohen and Dan Jinks

=== 2000s ===
Year	Film	Director(s)
2000 (21st)	Being John Malkovich	Spike Jonze
2001 (22nd)	Moulin Rouge!	Baz Luhrmann
2002 (23rd)	About Schmidt	Alexander Payne
2003 (24th)	Master and Commander: The Far Side of the World	Peter Weir
2004 (25th)	Sideways	Alexander Payne (2)
2005 (26th)	Brokeback Mountain	Ang Lee
2006 (27th)	United 93	Paul Greengrass
2007 (28th)	No Country for Old Men	Joel and Ethan Coen (2)
2008 (29th)	The Wrestler	Darren Aronofsky
2009 (30th)	A Prophet	Jacques Audiard
2010 (31st)	The Social Network	David Fincher
2011 (32nd)	The Artist	Michel Hazanavicius
2012 (33rd)	Amour	Michael Haneke
2013 (34th)	12 Years a Slave	Steve McQueen
2014 (35th)	Boyhood	Richard Linklater
2015 (36th)	Mad Max: Fury Road	George Miller
2016 (37th)	La La Land	Damien Chazelle
2017 (38th)	Three Billboards Outside Ebbing, Missouri	Martin McDonagh
2018 (39th)	Roma	Alfonso Cuarón
2019 (40th)	Parasite	Bong Joon-ho
2020 (41st)	Nomadland	Chloé Zhao
2021 (42nd)	The Power of the Dog	Jane Campion (2)
2022 (43rd)	Tár	Todd Field
2023 (44th)	The Zone of Interest	Jonathan Glazer
2024 (45th)	The Brutalist	Brady Corbet
2025 (46th)	One Battle After Another	Paul Thomas Anderson

== Multiple winning directors ==
The following directors have directed multiple award-winning films:

- 2 wins – Woody Allen (1985, 1990)
- 2 wins – Steven Spielberg (1994, 1998)
- 2 wins – Alexander Payne (2002, 2004)
- 2 wins – Joel and Ethan Coen (1996, 2007)
- 2 wins – Jane Campion (1993, 2021)
