= Awards season =

Time of the year when major entertainment awards occur

Awards season is an annual time period between November and February every year in the United States, when a majority of significant entertainment award events take place. In October ballots are sent out to voters, to collect nominations for the first award ceremonies, which are usually the Governors Awards or the independent Gotham Awards, to begin awards season in November. The season usually culminates in the Academy Awards in late February or early March (the latter in Winter Olympics years). The Grammy Awards are also presented during awards season.

== List of major awards ceremonies ==
=== November ===
- Gotham Awards
- Governors Awards
- People's Choice Awards

=== December ===
- National Board of Review
- New York Film Critics Circle
- Los Angeles Film Critics Association

=== January and early February ===
- National Society of Film Critics
- Critics' Choice Movie Awards
- Golden Globe Awards
- Producers Guild of America Awards
- Trifecta (film awards)
- Grammy Awards

=== February and March ===
- Annie Awards
- Directors Guild of America Awards
- Satellite Awards
- British Academy Film Awards
- Writers Guild of America Awards
- Independent Spirit Awards
- Golden Raspberry Awards
- Academy Awards
- Nickelodeon Kids' Choice Awards

== List of film awards seasons ==
- 2006–07 film awards season
- 2007–08 film awards season
- 2008–09 film awards season
- 2009–10 film awards season
- 2010–11 film awards season
- 2011–12 film awards season
- 2012–13 film awards season
- 2013–14 film awards season
- 2014–15 film awards season
- 2015–16 film awards season
- 2016–17 film awards season
- 2017–18 film awards season
- 2018–19 film awards season
- 2019–20 film awards season
- 2020–21 film awards season
- 2021–22 film awards season
- 2022–23 film awards season
- 2023–24 film awards season
- 2024–25 film awards season
- 2025–26 film awards season
- 2026–27 film awards season
- 2027–28 film awards season
- 2028–29 film awards season
- 2029–30 film awards season
