= Art Directors Guild Award for Excellence in Production Design for a Fantasy Film =

Film award

Art Directors Guild Award for Excellence in Production Design for a Contemporary Film
- Previous: Art Directors Guild Award for Excellence in Production Design for a Period or Fantasy Film
- Presented by: Art Directors Guild
- Established: 2006
- Currently held by: The Fantastic Four: First Steps (2025)

The Art Directors Guild Award for Excellence in Production Design for a Fantasy Film is an annual award given by the Art Directors Guild.

The award was previously combined with Excellence in Production Design for a Period Film from 2000 to 2005, before being spun out into its own category in 2006.

== Winners and nominees ==
Year	Film	Production Designer(s)
2006 (11th)	Pan's Labyrinth	Eugenio Caballero
2006 (11th)	Children of Men	Jim Clay and Geoffrey Kirkland
2006 (11th)	Pirates of the Caribbean: Dead Man's Chest	Rick Heinrichs
2006 (11th)	Superman Returns	Guy Hendrix Dyas
2006 (11th)	V for Vendetta	Owen Patterson
2007 (12th)	The Golden Compass	Dennis Gassner
2007 (12th)	300	James D. Bissell
2007 (12th)	Harry Potter and the Order of the Phoenix	Stuart Craig
2007 (12th)	Pirates of the Caribbean: At World's End	Rick Heinrichs
2007 (12th)	Ratatouille	Harley Jessup
2008 (13th)	The Dark Knight	Nathan Crowley
2008 (13th)	Indiana Jones and the Kingdom of the Crystal Skull	Guy Hendrix Dyas
2008 (13th)	Iron Man	J. Michael Riva
2008 (13th)	The Spiderwick Chronicles	James D. Bissell
2008 (13th)	WALL-E	Ralph Eggleston
2009 (14th)	Avatar	Rick Carter and Robert Stromberg
2009 (14th)	District 9	Philip Ivey
2009 (14th)	Harry Potter and the Half-Blood Prince	Stuart Craig
2009 (14th)	Star Trek	Scott Chambliss
2009 (14th)	Where the Wild Things Are	K. K. Barrett

=== 2010s ===
Year	Film	Production Designer(s)
2010 (15th)	Inception	Guy Hendrix Dyas
2010 (15th)	Alice in Wonderland	Robert Stromberg
2010 (15th)	The Chronicles of Narnia: The Voyage of the Dawn Treader	Barry Robison
2010 (15th)	Harry Potter and the Deathly Hallows – Part 1	Stuart Craig
2010 (15th)	Tron: Legacy	Darren Gilford
2011 (16th)	Harry Potter and the Deathly Hallows – Part 2	Stuart Craig
2011 (16th)	The Adventures of Tintin	Kim Sinclair
2011 (16th)	Captain America: The First Avenger	Rick Heinrichs
2011 (16th)	Cowboys & Aliens	Scott Chambliss
2011 (16th)	Pirates of the Caribbean: On Stranger Tides	John Myhre
2012 (17th)	Life of Pi	David Gropman
2012 (17th)	Cloud Atlas	Uli Hanisch
2012 (17th)	The Dark Knight Rises	Nathan Crowley and Kevin Kavanaugh
2012 (17th)	The Hobbit: An Unexpected Journey	Dan Hennah
2012 (17th)	Prometheus	Arthur Max
2013 (18th)	Gravity	Andy Nicholson
2013 (18th)	Elysium	Philip Ivey
2013 (18th)	The Hobbit: The Desolation of Smaug	Dan Hennah
2013 (18th)	Oblivion	Darren Gilford
2013 (18th)	Star Trek Into Darkness	Scott Chambliss
2014 (19th)	Guardians of the Galaxy	Charles Wood
2014 (19th)	Captain America: The Winter Soldier	Peter Wenham
2014 (19th)	Dawn of the Planet of the Apes	James Chinlund
2014 (19th)	Interstellar	Nathan Crowley
2014 (19th)	Into the Woods	Dennis Gassner
2015 (20th)	Mad Max: Fury Road	Colin Gibson
2015 (20th)	Cinderella	Dante Ferretti
2015 (20th)	Jurassic World	Edward Verreaux
2015 (20th)	Star Wars: The Force Awakens	Rick Carter and Darren Gilford
2015 (20th)	Tomorrowland	Scott Chambliss
2016 (21st)	Passengers	Guy Hendrix Dyas
2016 (21st)	Arrival	Patrice Vermette
2016 (21st)	Doctor Strange	Charles Wood
2016 (21st)	Fantastic Beasts and Where to Find Them	Stuart Craig
2016 (21st)	Rogue One: A Star Wars Story	Doug Chiang and Neil Lamont
2017 (22nd)	Blade Runner 2049	Dennis Gassner
2017 (22nd)	Beauty and the Beast	Sarah Greenwood
2017 (22nd)	Star Wars: The Last Jedi	Rick Heinrichs
2017 (22nd)	War for the Planet of the Apes	James Chinlund
2017 (22nd)	Wonder Woman	Aline Bonetto
2018 (23rd)	Black Panther	Hannah Beachler
2018 (23rd)	Fantastic Beasts: The Crimes of Grindelwald	Stuart Craig
2018 (23rd)	The House with a Clock in Its Walls	Jon Hutman
2018 (23rd)	Mary Poppins Returns	John Myhre
2018 (23rd)	Ready Player One	Adam Stockhausen
2019 (24th)	Avengers: Endgame	Charles Wood
2019 (24th)	Ad Astra	Kevin Thompson
2019 (24th)	Aladdin	Gemma Jackson
2019 (24th)	Dumbo	Rick Heinrichs
2019 (24th)	Maleficent: Mistress of Evil	Patrick Tatopoulos
2019 (24th)	Star Wars: The Rise of Skywalker	Rick Carter and Kevin Jenkins

=== 2020s ===
Year	Film	Production Designer(s)
2020 (25th)	Tenet	Nathan Crowley
2020 (25th)	Birds of Prey (and the Fantabulous Emancipation of One Harley Quinn)	K. K. Barrett
2020 (25th)	The Midnight Sky	Jim Bissell
2020 (25th)	Pinocchio	Dimitri Capuani
2020 (25th)	Wonder Woman 1984	Aline Bonetto
2021 (26th)	Dune	Patrice Vermette
2021 (26th)	Cruella	Fiona Crombie
2021 (26th)	Ghostbusters: Afterlife	François Audouy
2021 (26th)	The Green Knight	Jade Healy
2021 (26th)	Shang-Chi and the Legend of the Ten Rings	Sue Chan
2022 (27th)	Everything Everywhere All at Once	Jason Kisvarday
2022 (27th)	Avatar: The Way of Water	Dylan Cole and Ben Procter
2022 (27th)	The Batman	James Chinlund
2022 (27th)	Black Panther: Wakanda Forever	Hannah Beachler
2022 (27th)	Nope	Ruth De Jong
2023 (28th)	Poor Things	James Price and Shona Heath
2023 (28th)	Barbie	Sarah Greenwood
2023 (28th)	The Creator	James Clyne
2023 (28th)	Guardians of the Galaxy Vol. 3	Beth Mickle
2023 (28th)	Wonka	Nathan Crowley
2024 (29th)	Wicked	Nathan Crowley
2024 (29th)	Alien: Romulus	Naaman Marshall
2024 (29th)	Beetlejuice Beetlejuice	Mark Scruton
2024 (29th)	Dune: Part Two	Patrice Vermette
2024 (29th)	Furiosa: A Mad Max Saga	Colin Gibson
2025 (30th)	The Fantastic Four: First Steps	Kasra Farahani
2025 (30th)	Avatar: Fire and Ash	Dylan Cole and Ben Procter
2025 (30th)	Mickey 17	Fiona Crombie
2025 (30th)	Superman	Beth Mickle
2025 (30th)	Wicked: For Good	Nathan Crowley
