= Trifecta (film awards) =

Term in film awards season for sweeping the three major U.S. critics' groups

TRIFECTA The Trifecta of American Film Critics' Awards
- Genre: Film critics awards
- Frequency: Annual
- Location: United States
- Participants: New York Film Critics Circle; Los Angeles Film Critics Association; National Society of Film Critics

The Trifecta (also known as the American film critics' awards trifecta or NYFCC-LAFCA-NSFC trifecta) is a term used in Hollywood awards commentary to describe when a film, director, actor, actress, or other eligible recipient wins the same category at all three major film critics' organizations in a single season: the New York Film Critics Circle Awards (NYFCC), the Los Angeles Film Critics Association Awards (LAFCA), and the National Society of Film Critics Awards (NSFC).

These three groups, collectively known as the Trifecta of critics' awards, are considered the most prestigious film critics awards and early indicators in the awards season prior to the Golden Globes Awards ceremony. Trifecta awards are often announced in December and January. Winning the Trifecta in a major category, in all those three associations, is considered a significant achievement and a strong predictor of success at later broadcast awards ceremonies in the path to the Academy Awards.

== History and usage ==
The term Trifecta emerged in awards prognosticating circles during the end of 1990s as these critics' groups gained prominence for their influence on Oscar races. The NYFCC (founded 1935) announces first, typically in early December, followed by LAFCA (founded 1975) in mid-December, and NSFC (founded 1966) in early January. Unlike guild awards, these three major critics groups emphasize critical acclaim over commercial success, often favoring artistic merit over box office performance or bias towards American productions.

The Trifecta is tracked primarily in unified categories (no drama/musical split), and its winners frequently overlap with Oscar nominees or victors. For instance, seven films have achieved the Best Picture Trifecta, all earning Oscar nominations for Best Picture.

== Predictive power ==
- Since 2000, approximately 70% of Best Picture winners chosen by Trifecta critics groups have been nominated for the Academy Award for Best Picture, with several (e.g., Schindler's List, The Hurt Locker) winning.
- Acting Trifectas are rarer but highly predictive; winners like Cate Blanchett (Blue Jasmine, Tár) have gone on to Oscar victories.
- The NSFC win, as the final leg, often cements frontrunner status due to its reputation for artistic rigor.

== Complete Trifecta winners ==
=== Best Picture ===
Only eight films have swept Best Picture across NYFCC, LAFCA, and NSFC.

Year	Film	Director	NYFCC	LAFCA	NSFC
1990	Goodfellas	Martin Scorsese	Won	Won	Won
1993	Schindler's List	Steven Spielberg	Won	Won	Won
1997	L.A. Confidential	Curtis Hanson	Won	Won	Won
2009	The Hurt Locker	Kathryn Bigelow	Won	Won	Won
2010	The Social Network	David Fincher	Won	Won	Won
2021	Drive My Car	Ryûsuke Hamaguchi	Won	Won	Won
2022	Tár	Todd Field	Won	Won	Won
2025	One Battle After Another	Paul Thomas Anderson	Won	Won	Won

=== Best Director ===
Year	Director	Film	NYFCC	LAFCA	NSFC
2008	David Fincher	The Curious Case of Benjamin Button	Won	Won	Won
2010	David Fincher	The Social Network	Won	Won	Won
2016	Barry Jenkins	Moonlight	Won	Won	Won
2020	Chloe Zhao	Nomadland	Won	Won	Won

=== Best Actor ===
Year	Actor	Film	NYFCC	LAFCA	NSFC
1980	John Hurt	The Elephant Man	Won	Won	Won
1982	Jack Lemmon	Missing	Won	Won	Won
2007	Daniel Day-Lewis	There Will Be Blood	Won	Won	Won
2008	Sean Penn	Milk	Won	Won	Won
2013	Bruce Dern	Nebraska	Won	Won	Won
2018	Ethan Hawke	First Reformed	Won	Won	Won
2019	Antonio Banderas	Pain and Glory	Won	Won	Won

=== Best Actress ===
Year	Actress	Film	NYFCC	LAFCA	NSFC
1979	Sally Field	Norma Rae	Won	Won	Won
1980	Sissy Spacek	Coal Miner's Daughter	Won	Won	Won
1982	Meryl Streep	Sophie's Choice	Won	Won	Won
1992	Emma Thompson	Howards End	Won	Won	Won
1993	Holly Hunter	The Piano	Won	Won	Won
2006	Helen Mirren	The Queen	Won	Won	Won
2008	Sally Hawkins	Happy-Go-Lucky	Won	Won	Won
2013	Cate Blanchett	Blue Jasmine	Won	Won	Won
2016	Isabelle Huppert	Elle and Things to Come	Won	Won	Won
2022	Cate Blanchett	Tár	Won	Won	Won
2024	Marianne Jean-Baptiste	Hard Truths	Won	Won	Won

=== Best Supporting Actor ===
Year	Actor	Film	NYFCC	LAFCA	NSFC
1983	Jack Nicholson	Terms of Endearment	Won	Won	Won
1987	Morgan Freeman	Street Smart	Won	Won	Won
1992	Gene Hackman	Unforgiven	Won	Won	Won
1994	Martin Landau	Ed Wood	Won	Won	Won
1996	Bill Murray	Rushmore	Won	Won	Won
2009	Christoph Waltz	Inglourious Basterds	Won	Won	Won
2014	J. K. Simmons	Whiplash	Won	Won	Won
2016	Mahershala Ali	Moonlight	Won	Won	Won
2017	Willem Dafoe	The Florida Project	Won	Won	Won
2022	Ke Huy Quan	Everything Everywhere All at Once	Won	Won	Won
2024	Kieran Culkin	A Real Pain	Won	Won	Won

=== Best Supporting Actress ===
Year	Actress	Film	NYFCC	LAFCA	NSFC
1979	Meryl Streep	Kramer vs. Kramer	Won	Won	Won
1986	Dianne Wiest	Hannah and Her Sisters	Won	Won	Won
1994	Dianne Wiest	Bullets Over Broadway	Won	Won	Won
2004	Virginia Madsen	Sideways	Won	Won	Won
2013	Lupita Nyong'o	12 Years a Slave	Won	Won	Won
2018	Regina King	If Beale Street Could Talk	Won	Won	Won
2023	Da'Vine Joy Randolph	The Holdovers	Won	Won	Won

=== Best Documentary Feature ===
Year	Film	NYFCC	LAFCA	NSFC
1989	Roger & Me	Won	Won	Won
1991	Paris Is Burning	Won	Won	Won
1994	Hoop Dreams	Won	Won	Won
1995	Crumb	Won	Won	Won
1996	When We Were Kings	Won	Won	Won
1998	The Farm: Angola, USA	Won	Won	Won
1999	Buena Vista Social Club	Won	Won	Won
2001	The Gleaners and I	Won	Won	Won
2005	Grizzly Man	Won	Won	Won
2008	Man on Wire	Won	Won	Won
2011	Cave of Forgotten Dreams	Won	Won	Won
2012	The Gatekeepers	Won	Won	Won
2014	Citizenfour	Won	Won	Won
2017	Faces Places	Won	Won	Won
2020	Time	Won	Won	Won
2021	Flee	Won	Won	Won
2022	All the Beauty and the Bloodshed	Won	Won	Won
2023	Menus-Plaisirs – Les Troisgros	Won	Won	Won
2024	No Other Land	Won	Won	Won
2025	My Undesirable Friends: Part I — Last Air in Moscow	Won	Won	Won

== See also ==
- Awards season
