= 2015 National Society of Film Critics Awards =

Annual US film awards ceremony

50th NSFC Awards

January 3, 2016

Best Film:
Spotlight

The 50th National Society of Film Critics Awards, given on 3 January 2016, honored the best in film for 2015.

== Winners ==
Winners are listed in boldface along with the runner-up positions and counts from the final round:

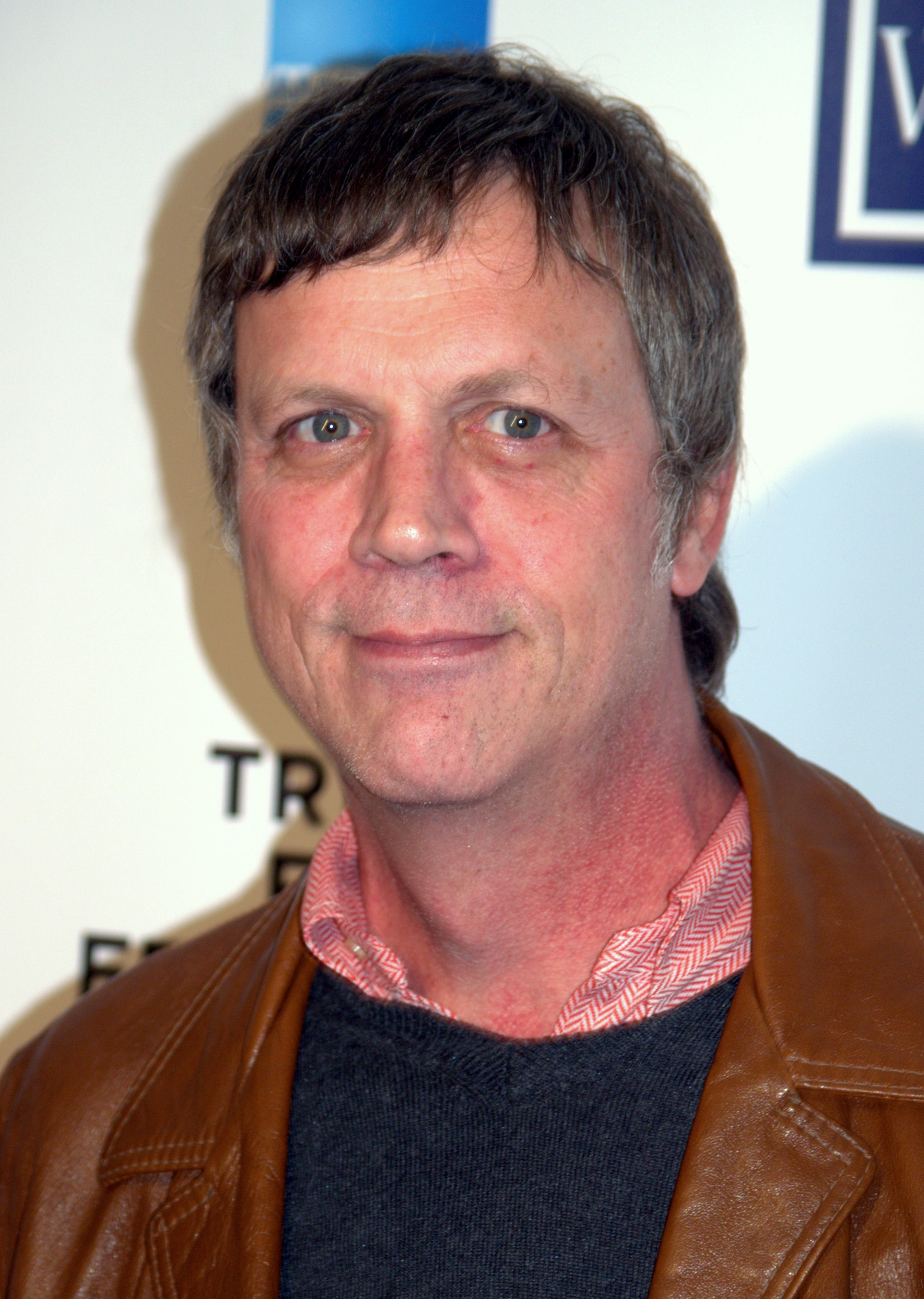
Todd Haynes, Best Director winner

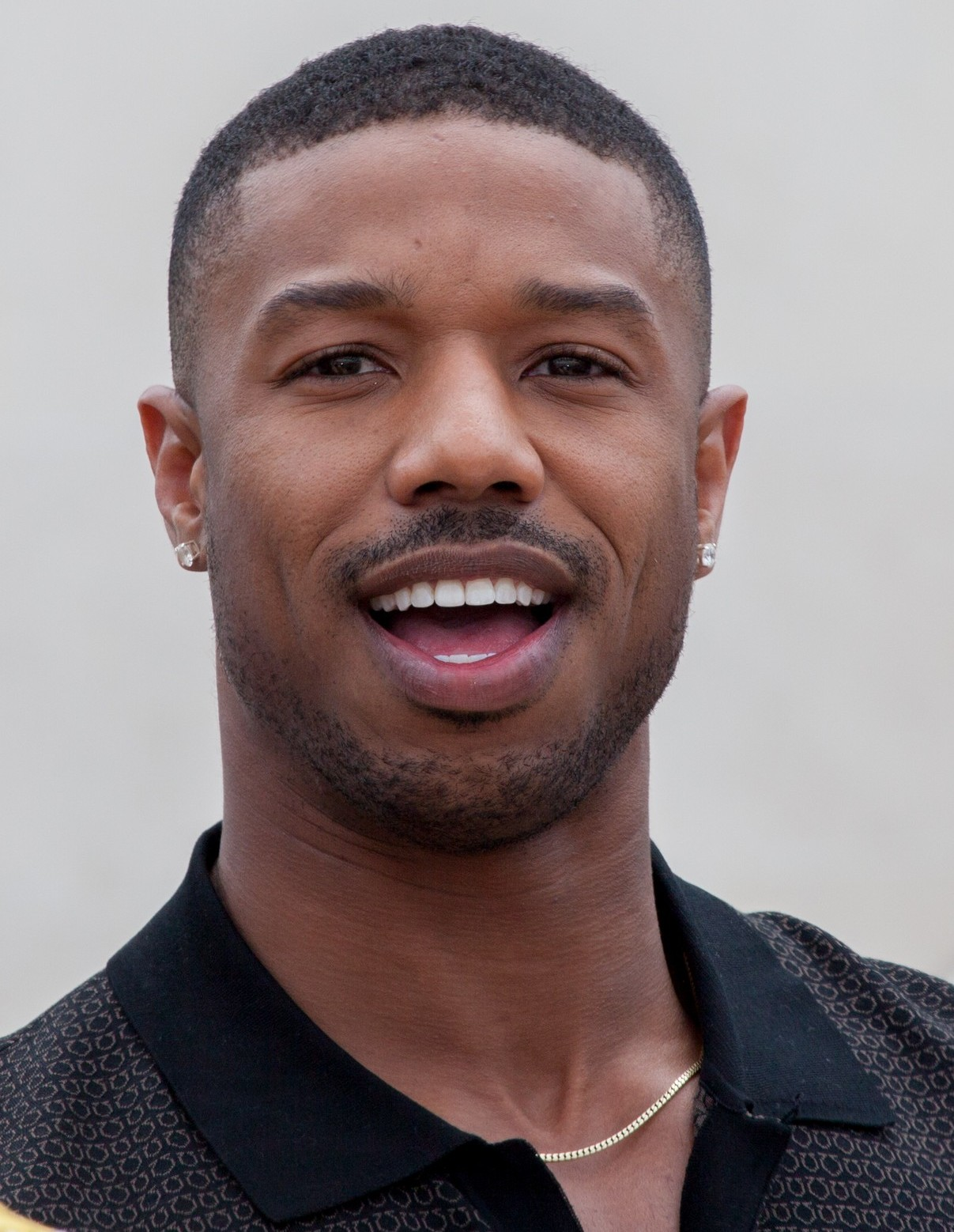
Michael B. Jordan, Best Actor winner

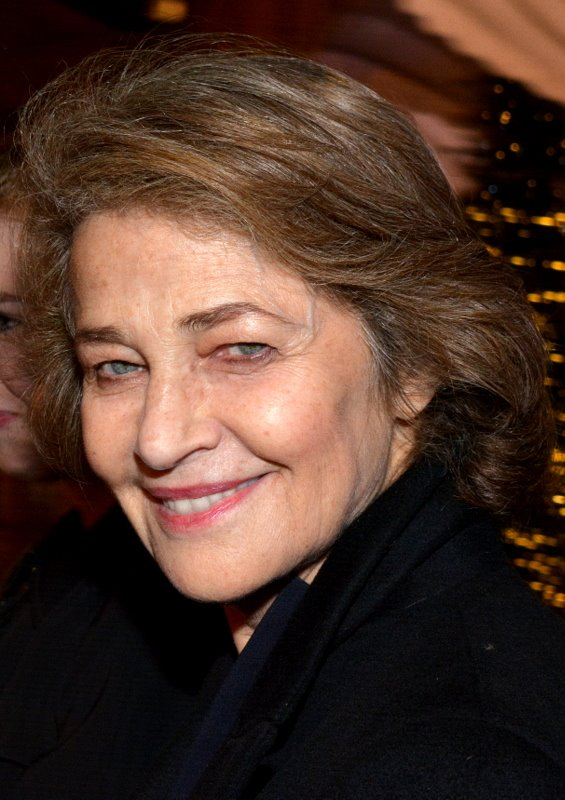
Charlotte Rampling, Best Actress winner

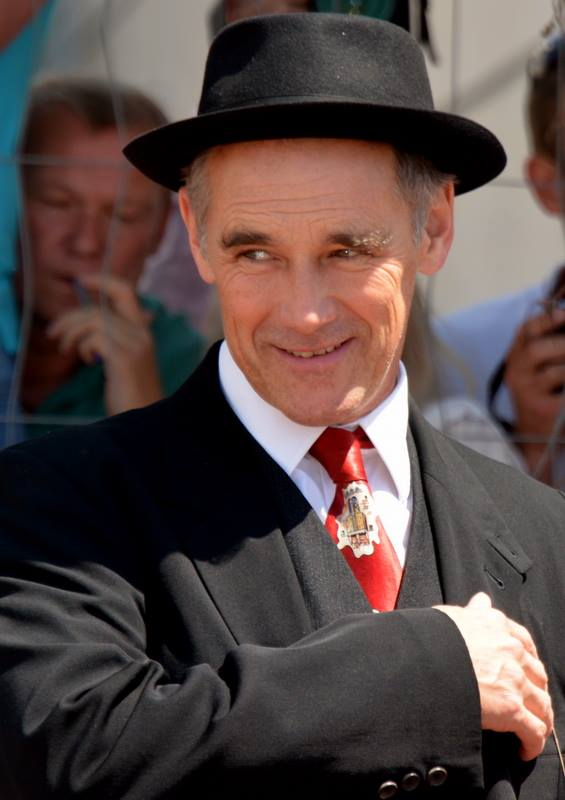
Mark Rylance, Best Supporting Actor winner

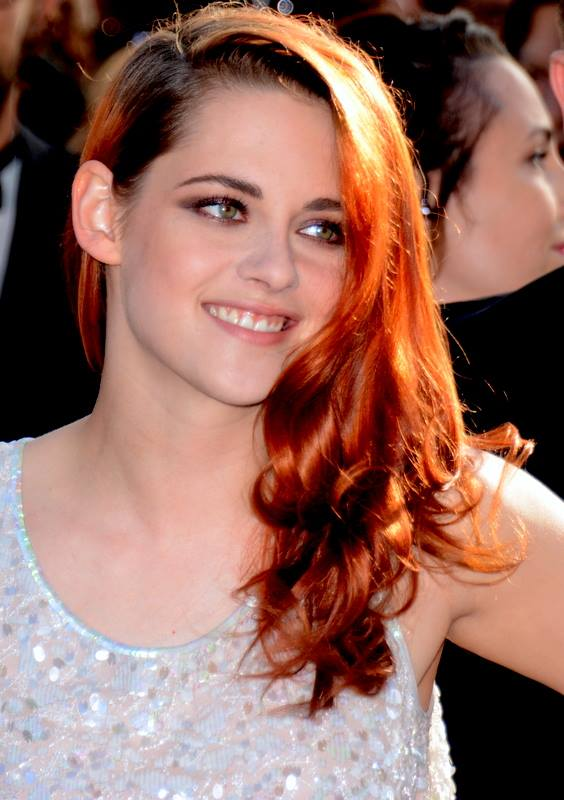
Kristen Stewart, Best Supporting Actress winner

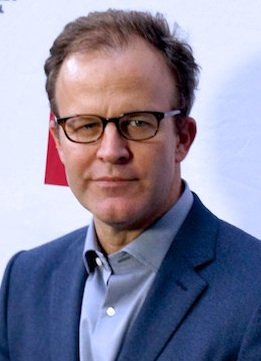
Tom McCarthy, Best Screenplay co-winner

=== Best Picture ===
1. **Spotlight** (23)
2. Carol (17)
3. Mad Max: Fury Road (13)

=== Best Director ===
1. **Todd Haynes – Carol** (21)
2. Tom McCarthy – Spotlight (21) (Note: Because he was on fewer ballots; a winner must be on a majority of ballots, which are weighted.)
3. George Miller – Mad Max: Fury Road (20)

=== Best Actor ===
1. **Michael B. Jordan – Creed** (29)
2. Géza Röhrig – Son of Saul (18)
3. Tom Courtenay – 45 Years (15)

=== Best Actress ===
1. **Charlotte Rampling – 45 Years** (57)
2. Saoirse Ronan – Brooklyn (30)
3. Nina Hoss – Phoenix (22)

=== Best Supporting Actor ===
1. **Mark Rylance – Bridge of Spies** (56)
2. Michael Shannon – 99 Homes (15)
3. Sylvester Stallone – Creed (14)

=== Best Supporting Actress ===
1. **Kristen Stewart – Clouds of Sils Maria** (53)
2. Alicia Vikander – Ex Machina (23)
3. Kate Winslet – Steve Jobs / Elizabeth Banks – Love & Mercy (17)

=== Best Screenplay ===
1. **Tom McCarthy and Josh Singer – Spotlight** (21)
2. Charlie Kaufman – Anomalisa / Adam McKay and Charles Randolph – The Big Short (15)

=== Best Cinematography ===
1. **Edward Lachman – Carol** (25)
2. Mark Lee Ping-bing – The Assassin (22)
3. John Seale – Mad Max: Fury Road (12)

=== Best Foreign Language Film ===
1. **Timbuktu – Abderrahmane Sissako** (22)
2. Phoenix – Christian Petzold (20)
3. The Assassin – Hou Hsiao-hsien (16)

=== Best Non-Fiction Film ===
1. **Amy – Asif Kapadia** (23)
2. In Jackson Heights – Frederick Wiseman (18)
3. Seymour: An Introduction – Ethan Hawke (15)

=== Film Heritage Awards ===
1. Film Society of Lincoln Center and the programmers Jake Perlin and Michelle Materre, for the series Tell It Like It Is: Black Independents in New York, 1968–1986.
2. The Criterion Collection and L'Immagine Ritrovata for the restoration and packaging of the reconstructed version of The Apu Trilogy by Satyajit Ray.
3. Lobster Films and Fondazione Cineteca di Bologna / L'Immagine Ritrovata for the restoration of Charlie Chaplin's Essanay Films.

=== Special Citation ===
One Floor Below, a Romanian film directed by Radu Muntean.

=== Dedication ===
As per tradition, the ceremony was dedicated to the late Richard Corliss, longtime critic at TIME magazine.
