= London Film Critics Circle Awards 1993 =

British film awards ceremony

14th London Film Critics Circle Awards

1994

Film of the Year:
The Piano

British Film of the Year:
The Remains of the Day

The 14th London Film Critics Circle Awards, honouring the best in film for 1993, were announced by the London Film Critics Circle in 1994.

== Winners ==
Film of the Year

- The Piano

British Film of the Year

- The Remains of the Day

Foreign Language Film of the Year

- Un Coeur en Hiver • France

Director of the Year

- James Ivory – The Remains of the Day

British Director of the Year

- Ken Loach – Raining Stones

Screenwriter of the Year

- Harold Ramis and Danny Rubin – Groundhog Day

British Screenwriter of the Year

- Roddy Doyle – The Snapper

Actor of the Year

- Anthony Hopkins – The Remains of the Day

Actress of the Year

- Holly Hunter – The Piano

British Actor of the Year

- David Thewlis – Naked

British Actress of the Year

- Miranda Richardson – Damage

Newcomer of the Year

- Quentin Tarantino – Reservoir Dogs

British Newcomer of the Year

- Vadim Jean and Gary Sinyor – Leon the Pig Farmer

British Technical Achievement of the Year

- Ken Adam – Addams Family Values

British Producer of the Year

- Kenneth Branagh – Much Ado About Nothing

Special Achievement Award

- Kate Maberly – The Secret Garden

Dilys Powell Award

- Christopher Lee
