= National Society of Film Critics =

American film critics association

The National Society of Film Critics (NSFC) is an American film critic organization found in 1966. The organization is known for its highbrow tastes, and its annual awards are one of the most prestigious film critics awards in the United States. In January 2024, the NSFC had approximately 60 members who wrote for a variety of weekly and daily newspapers along with major publications and media outlets.

== History ==
The society was founded in 1966 in the New York City apartment of the Saturday Review critic Hollis Alpert, one of several co-founding film critics who was refused membership to the New York Film Critics Circle because it preferred critics who worked for mainstream newspapers. His co-founders included Pauline Kael, a writer for The New Yorker, Joe Morgenstern, then a movie reviewer for Newsweek and Richard Schickel, a film critic for Life magazine. The society was founded to counteract the influence of New York Times critic Bosley Crowther, who dominated the New York City film critics scene for many years. The original founding film critics, who were overwhelmingly based in New York, called their new group a "national" organization because they wrote for a number of magazines and newspapers with a national circulation.

Past distinguished members include Richard Corliss, the late Roger Ebert, David Edelstein, Stanley Kauffmann and Dave Kehr. As of November 2023, the 61 current members include David Ansen, Richard Brody, Justin Chang, Steve Erickson, Emanuel Levy, Amy Nicholson, Gerald Peary, Jonathan Rosenbaum, David Sterritt, Peter Travers, Kenneth Turan and Stephanie Zacharek.

The organization is known for its highbrow tastes, and its annual awards are one of the more prestigious film critics awards in the United States. In past years, many of its Best Picture winners have been foreign films, and the choices rarely parallel the Academy Awards. It has agreed with the Oscar in nine instances since 1977: Annie Hall (1977), Unforgiven (1992), Schindler's List (1993), Million Dollar Baby (2004), The Hurt Locker (2009), Spotlight (2015), Moonlight (2016), Parasite (2019), and Nomadland (2020). Five other winners did receive the Oscar for Best Foreign Language Film: Z, The Discreet Charm of the Bourgeoisie (French: Le Charme discret de la bourgeoisie), Day for Night (French: La Nuit américaine), Get Out Your Handkerchiefs (French: Préparez vos mouchoirs), and Amour.

The NSFC is also the American representative of the International Federation of Film Critics, which comprises the national organizations of professional film critics and film journalists from around the world.

== Books ==
The society has published an ongoing series of anthologies of articles, including:

- The B List:The National Society of Film Critics on the Low-Budget Beauties, Genre-Bending Mavericks, and Cult Classics We Love, edited by David Sterritt and John C. Anderson, 2008
- The X List: A Guide to the Movies That Turn Us On, edited by Jami Bernard, Da Capo Press, 2005
- The A List: 100 Essential Films, edited by Jay Carr, Da Capo Press, 2002
- Flesh and Blood: On Sex, Violence, and Censorship, edited by Peter Keough, Mercury House, 1995
- They Went Thataway: Redefining Film Genres, edited by Richard T. Jameson, Mercury House, 1994
- Love and Hisses: Sound Off on the Hottest Movie Controversies, edited by Peter Rainer, Mercury House, 1992
- Foreign Affairs: A Guide to Foreign Films, edited by Kathy Schulz Huffhines, Mercury House, 1991
- Produced and Abandoned: The Best Films You've Never Seen, edited by Michael Sragow, Mercury House, 1990
- The National Society of Film Critics on the Movie Star, edited by Elisabeth Weis, Penguin, 1981
- The National Society of Film Critics on Movie Comedy, edited by Stuart Byron and Elisabeth Weis, Penguin, 1977

== Annual film award categories ==
- Best Picture
- Best Director
- Best Actor
- Best Actress
- Best Supporting Actor
- Best Supporting Actress
- Best Screenplay
- Best Cinematography
- Best Foreign Language Film
- Best Non-Fiction Film
- Best Experimental Film
- Film Heritage Award

== See also ==
- Trifecta (film awards)
- New York Film Critics Circle
- Los Angeles Film Critics Association
