= Michelle Materre =

American educator and film distributor (1954–2022)

Michelle Angelina Materre (May 12, 1954 – March 11, 2022) was an American educator and film distributor. She was an early proponent of independent films by Black female directors.

Materre was appointed associate professor at The New School in 2000 and ran media studies courses.
