= 2006–07 film awards season =

Film awards for 2006

- Duration: 23 October 2006 – 25 February 2007

Film Awards seasons
- ← 2005–06 2007–08 →

The 2006–07 film awards season began in November 2006 and ended in February 2007.

Ballots were sent out beginning from November.

== Awards ceremonies ==
Award ceremony	Ceremony date	Best Film	Best Director	Best Actor	Best Actress	Best Supporting Actor	Best Supporting Actress	Best Original Screenplay	Best Adapted Screenplay	Ref.
16th Annual Gotham Independent Film Awards	29 November 2006	Half Nelson	—N/a							
11th Satellite Awards	18 December 2006	The Departed (Drama); Dreamgirls (Musical/Comedy)	Bill Condon; Dreamgirls; Clint Eastwood; Flags of Our Fathers	Forest Whitaker (Drama); The Last King of Scotland; Joseph Cross (Musical/Comedy); Running with Scissors	Helen Mirren (Drama); The Queen; Meryl Streep (Musical/Comedy); The Devil Wears Prada	Leonardo DiCaprio; The Departed	Jennifer Hudson; Dreamgirls	Peter Morgan; The Queen	William Monahan; The Departed	
41st National Society of Film Critics Awards	6 January 2007	Pan's Labyrinth	Paul Greengrass; United 93	Forest Whitaker; The Last King of Scotland	Helen Mirren; The Queen	Mark Wahlberg; The Departed	Meryl Streep; The Devil Wears Prada	Peter Morgan; The Queen		
78th National Board of Review Awards	9 January 2007	Letters from Iwo Jima	Martin Scorsese; The Departed	Djimon Hounsou; Blood Diamond	Helen Mirren; The Queen	Alan Arkin; Little Miss Sunshine	Catherine O'Hara; For Your Consideration	Zach Helm; Stranger Than Fiction	Ron Nyswaner; The Painted Veil	
12th Critics' Choice Awards	14 January 2007	The Departed	Martin Scorsese; The Departed	Forest Whitaker; The Last King of Scotland	Helen Mirren; The Queen	Eddie Murphy; Dreamgirls	Jennifer Hudson; Dreamgirls	Michael Arndt; Little Miss Sunshine		
64th Golden Globe Awards	15 January 2007	Babel (Drama); Dreamgirls (Musical/Comedy)	Martin Scorsese; The Departed	Forest Whitaker (Drama); The Last King of Scotland; Sacha Baron Cohen (Musical/Comedy); Borat	Helen Mirren (Drama); The Queen; Meryl Streep (Musical/Comedy); The Devil Wears Prada	Eddie Murphy; Dreamgirls	Jennifer Hudson; Dreamgirls	Peter Morgan; The Queen		
18th Producers Guild of America Awards	20 January 2007	Little Miss Sunshine	—N/a							
13th Screen Actors Guild Awards	28 January 2007	(Ensemble Cast); Little Miss Sunshine	—N/a	Forest Whitaker; The Last King of Scotland	Helen Mirren; The Queen	Eddie Murphy; Dreamgirls	Jennifer Hudson; Dreamgirls	—N/a		
59th Directors Guild of America Awards	3 February 2007	—N/a	Martin Scorsese; The Departed	—N/a						
59th Writers Guild of America Awards	11 February 2007	—N/a						Michael Arndt; Little Miss Sunshine	William Monahan; The Departed	
60th British Academy Film Awards	11 February 2007	The Queen	Paul Greengrass; United 93	Forest Whitaker; The Last King of Scotland	Helen Mirren; The Queen	Alan Arkin; Little Miss Sunshine	Jennifer Hudson; Dreamgirls	Michael Arndt; Little Miss Sunshine	Peter Morgan and Jeremy Brock; The Last King of Scotland	
22nd Independent Spirit Awards	24 February 2007	Little Miss Sunshine	Jonathan Dayton and Valerie Faris; Little Miss Sunshine	Ryan Gosling; Half Nelson	Shareeka Epps; Half Nelson	Alan Arkin; Little Miss Sunshine	Frances McDormand; Friends with Money	Jason Reitman; Thank You for Smoking		
79th Academy Awards	25 February 2007	The Departed	Martin Scorsese; The Departed	Forest Whitaker; The Last King of Scotland	Helen Mirren; The Queen	Alan Arkin; Little Miss Sunshine	Jennifer Hudson; Dreamgirls	Michael Arndt; Little Miss Sunshine	William Monahan; The Departed	

== See also ==
- Film awards seasons
