= 2015–16 film awards season =

Film awards for 2015

- Duration: 22 October 2015 – 28 February 2016

Film Awards seasons
- ← 2014–15 2016–17 →

The 2015–16 film awards season began in November 2015 with the Gotham Independent Film Awards 2015 and ended in February 2016 with the 88th Academy Awards. Major winners for the year included The Revenant, Mad Max: Fury Road, Spotlight, Room and Steve Jobs among others.

== Award ceremonies ==
Award ceremony	Ceremony date	Best Film	Best Director	Best Actor	Best Actress	Best Supporting Actor	Best Supporting Actress	Best Original Screenplay	Best Adapted Screenplay	Ref.
25th Annual Gotham Independent Film Awards	30 November 2015	Spotlight	—N/a	Paul Dano; Love & Mercy	Bel Powley; The Diary of a Teenage Girl	—N/a		Tom McCarthy and Josh Singer; Spotlight		
87th National Board of Review Awards	1 December 2015	Mad Max: Fury Road	Ridley Scott; The Martian	Matt Damon; The Martian	Brie Larson; Room	Sylvester Stallone; Creed	Jennifer Jason Leigh; The Hateful Eight	Quentin Tarantino; The Hateful Eight	Drew Goddard; The Martian	
50th National Society of Film Critics Awards	3 January 2016	Spotlight	Todd Haynes; Carol	Michael B. Jordan; Creed	Charlotte Rampling; 45 Years	Mark Rylance; Bridge of Spies	Kristen Stewart; Clouds of Sils Maria	Tom McCarthy and Josh Singer; Spotlight		
73rd Golden Globe Awards	10 January 2016	The Revenant (Drama); The Martian (Musical or Comedy)	Alejandro G. Iñárritu; The Revenant	Leonardo DiCaprio (Drama); The Revenant; Matt Damon (Musical or Comedy); The Martian	Brie Larson (Drama); Room; Jennifer Lawrence (Musical or Comedy); Joy	Sylvester Stallone; Creed	Kate Winslet; Steve Jobs	Aaron Sorkin; Steve Jobs		
21st Critics' Choice Awards	17 January 2016	Spotlight	George Miller; Mad Max: Fury Road	Leonardo DiCaprio; The Revenant	Brie Larson; Room	Sylvester Stallone; Creed	Alicia Vikander; The Danish Girl	Tom McCarthy and Josh Singer; Spotlight	Adam McKay and Charles Randolph; The Big Short	
27th Producers Guild of America Awards	23 January 2016	The Big Short	—N/a							
5th AACTA International Awards	29 January 2016	Mad Max: Fury Road	George Miller; Mad Max: Fury Road	Leonardo DiCaprio; The Revenant	Cate Blanchett; Carol	Mark Rylance; Bridge of Spies	Rooney Mara; Carol	Tom McCarthy and Josh Singer; Spotlight		
22nd Screen Actors 68th Directors 68th Writers Guild of America Awards	30 January, 6, 13 February 2016	Spotlight (Ensemble Cast)	Alejandro G. Iñárritu; The Revenant	Leonardo DiCaprio; The Revenant	Brie Larson; Room	Idris Elba; Beasts of No Nation	Alicia Vikander; The Danish Girl	Tom McCarthy and Josh Singer; Spotlight	Adam McKay and Charles Randolph; The Big Short	
69th British Academy Film Awards	14 February 2016	The Revenant	Alejandro G. Iñárritu; The Revenant	Leonardo DiCaprio; The Revenant	Brie Larson; Room	Mark Rylance; Bridge of Spies	Kate Winslet; Steve Jobs	Tom McCarthy and Josh Singer; Spotlight	Adam McKay and Charles Randolph; The Big Short	
20th Satellite Awards	21 February 2016	Spotlight	Tom McCarthy; Spotlight	Leonardo DiCaprio; The Revenant	Saoirse Ronan; Brooklyn	Christian Bale; The Big Short	Alicia Vikander; The Danish Girl	Tom McCarthy and Josh Singer; Spotlight	Aaron Sorkin; Steve Jobs	
31st Independent Spirit Awards	27 February 2016	Spotlight	Tom McCarthy; Spotlight	Abraham Attah; Beasts of No Nation	Brie Larson; Room	Idris Elba; Beasts of No Nation	Mya Taylor; Tangerine	Tom McCarthy and Josh Singer; Spotlight		
88th Academy Awards	28 February 2016	Spotlight	Alejandro G. Iñárritu; The Revenant	Leonardo DiCaprio; The Revenant	Brie Larson; Room	Mark Rylance; Bridge of Spies	Alicia Vikander; The Danish Girl	Tom McCarthy and Josh Singer; Spotlight	Adam McKay and Charles Randolph; The Big Short	

=== Critics Prizes ===
Award dates	Ceremony	Best Film winner	Ref.
2 December 2015	81st New York Film Critics Circle Awards	Carol	
6 December 2015	41st Los Angeles Film Critics Association Awards	Spotlight	
17 January 2016	36th London Film Critics Circle Awards	Mad Max: Fury Road	

== Films by awards gained ==
Major Awards and nominations received
Films	Academy Awards		BAFTA Awards		Golden Globe Awards		Guild Awards		Critics' Choice Awards		Satellite Awards		Total	
Films	Noms	Wins	Noms	Wins	Noms	Wins	Noms	Wins	Noms	Wins	Noms	Wins	Noms	Wins
45 Years	1		1		—N/a	—N/a	—N/a	—N/a	1		1		4	0
99 Homes	—N/a	—N/a	—N/a	—N/a	1		1		1		—N/a	—N/a	3	0
Amy	1	1	2	1	—N/a	—N/a	1	1	1	1	1	1	6	5
Ant-Man	—N/a	—N/a	1		—N/a	—N/a	—N/a	—N/a	1		—N/a	—N/a	2	0
The Assassin	—N/a	—N/a	1		—N/a	—N/a	—N/a	—N/a	1		2	1	4	1
Beasts of No Nation	—N/a	—N/a	1		1		3	2	1		—N/a	—N/a	6	2
The Big Short	5	1	5	1	4		6	2	7	3	2	1	29	8
Black Mass	—N/a	—N/a	—N/a	—N/a	—N/a	—N/a	1		2		3		6	0
Bridge of Spies	6	1	9	1	1		4		5		5	1	30	3
Brooklyn	3		6	1	1		—N/a	—N/a	5		2	1	16	2
Carol	6		9		5		4		9		5	1	38	1
Cinderella	1		1		—N/a	—N/a	4	1	1		2		9	1
Concussion	—N/a	—N/a	—N/a	—N/a	1		—N/a	—N/a	—N/a	—N/a	1		2	0
Creed	1		—N/a	—N/a	1	1	—N/a	—N/a	1	1	1		4	2
The Danish Girl	4	1	5		3		4	2	5	1	7	1	28	5
Ex Machina	2	1	5		1		7	1	3	1	—N/a	—N/a	18	3
Grandma	—N/a	—N/a	—N/a	—N/a	1		—N/a	—N/a	1		—N/a	—N/a	2	0
The Hateful Eight	3	1	3	1	3	1	—N/a	—N/a	6	1	—N/a	—N/a	15	4
The Hunting Ground	1		—N/a	—N/a	—N/a	—N/a	2	1	1		2	1	6	2
Inside Out	2	1	2	1	1	1	1	1	3	1	4	1	13	6
Joy	1		—N/a	—N/a	2	1	2		3		—N/a	—N/a	8	1
The Lady in the Van	—N/a	—N/a	1		1		—N/a	—N/a	—N/a	—N/a	—N/a	—N/a	2	0
Love & Mercy	—N/a	—N/a	—N/a	—N/a	2		—N/a	—N/a	2		4		8	0
Mad Max: Fury Road	10	6	7	4	2		5	3	13	9	4	1	41	23
The Martian	7		6		3	2	6	1	9		8	1	39	4
The Revenant	12	3	8	5	4	3	5	4	9	2	5	1	43	18
Room	4	1	2	1	3	1	2	1	4	2	4		19	7
Sicario	3		3		—N/a	—N/a	4	1	5		5	1	20	2
Spectre	1	1	—N/a	—N/a	1	1	2		2		7		13	2
Spotlight	6	2	3	1	3		5	2	8	3	7	4	32	12
Spy	—N/a	—N/a	—N/a	—N/a	2		—N/a	—N/a	3		—N/a	—N/a	5	0
Star Wars: The Force Awakens	5		4	1	—N/a	—N/a	3		1		—N/a	—N/a	13	1
Steve Jobs	2		3	1	4	2	3		4		4	1	20	4
Straight Outta Compton	1		—N/a	—N/a	—N/a	—N/a	3		1		1		6	0
Theeb	1		2	1	—N/a	—N/a	—N/a	—N/a	—N/a	—N/a	—N/a	—N/a	3	1
Trainwreck	—N/a	—N/a	—N/a	—N/a	2		1		3	1	—N/a	—N/a	6	1
Trumbo	1		1		2		5		3		3		15	0
The Walk	—N/a	—N/a	—N/a	—N/a	—N/a	—N/a	—N/a	—N/a	1		1	1	2	1
Youth	1		—N/a	—N/a	2		2		1		1		7	0
