= 2019–20 film awards season =

Film awards for 2019

- Duration: 24 October 2019 – 9 February 2020

Film Awards seasons
- ← 2018–19 2020–21 →

The 2019–20 film awards season began in December 2019 with the 29th Annual Gotham Independent Film Awards and ended in February 2020 with the 92nd Academy Awards.

== Award ceremonies ==
Award ceremony	Ceremony date	Best Picture	Best Director	Best Actor	Best Actress	Best Supporting Actor	Best Supporting Actress	Best Original Screenplay	Best Adapted Screenplay	Ref.
29th Annual Gotham Independent Film Awards	2 December 2019	Marriage Story	—N/a	Adam Driver; Marriage Story	Awkwafina; The Farewell	—N/a		Noah Baumbach; Marriage Story		
91st National Board of Review Awards	3 December 2019	The Irishman	Quentin Tarantino; Once Upon a Time in Hollywood	Adam Sandler; Uncut Gems	Renée Zellweger; Judy	Brad Pitt; Once Upon a Time in Hollywood	Kathy Bates; Richard Jewell	Josh Safdie, Benny Safdie and Ronald Bronstein; Uncut Gems	Steven Zaillian; The Irishman	
24th Satellite Awards	19 December 2019	Ford v Ferrari (Drama); Once Upon a Time in Hollywood (Musical or Comedy)	James Mangold; Ford v Ferrari	Christian Bale (Drama); Ford v Ferrari; Taron Egerton (Musical or Comedy); Rocketman	Scarlett Johansson (Drama); Marriage Story; Awkwafina (Musical or Comedy); The Farewell	Willem Dafoe; The Lighthouse	Jennifer Lopez; Hustlers	Noah Baumbach; Marriage Story	Todd Phillips and Scott Silver; Joker	
9th AACTA International Awards	3 January 2020	Parasite	Quentin Tarantino; Once Upon a Time in Hollywood	Adam Driver; Marriage Story	Saoirse Ronan; Little Women	Brad Pitt; Once Upon a Time in Hollywood	Margot Robbie; Bombshell	Taika Waititi; Jojo Rabbit		
53rd National Society of Film Critics Awards	4 January 2020	Parasite	Greta Gerwig; Little Women	Antonio Banderas; Pain and Glory	Mary Kay Place; Diane	Brad Pitt; Once Upon a Time in Hollywood	Laura Dern; Marriage Story and Little Women	Bong Joon-ho and Han Jin-won; Parasite		
77th Golden Globe Awards	5 January 2020	1917 (Drama); Once Upon a Time in Hollywood (Musical or Comedy)	Sam Mendes; 1917	Joaquin Phoenix (Drama); Joker; Taron Egerton (Musical or Comedy); Rocketman	Renée Zellweger (Drama); Judy; Awkwafina (Musical or Comedy); The Farewell	Brad Pitt; Once Upon a Time in Hollywood	Laura Dern; Marriage Story	Quentin Tarantino; Once Upon a Time in Hollywood		
25th Critics' Choice Awards	12 January 2020	Once Upon a Time in Hollywood	Sam Mendes; 1917; Bong Joon-ho; Parasite	Joaquin Phoenix; Joker	Renée Zellweger; Judy	Brad Pitt; Once Upon a Time in Hollywood	Laura Dern; Marriage Story	Quentin Tarantino; Once Upon a Time in Hollywood	Greta Gerwig; Little Women	
31st Producers 26th Screen Actors 72nd Directors 72nd Writers Guild of America Awards	18–19, 25 January and 1 February 2020	1917	Sam Mendes; 1917	Joaquin Phoenix; Joker	Renée Zellweger; Judy	Brad Pitt; Once Upon a Time in Hollywood	Laura Dern; Marriage Story	Bong Joon-ho and Han Jin-won; Parasite	Taika Waititi; Jojo Rabbit	
73rd British Academy Film Awards	2 February 2020	1917	Sam Mendes; 1917	Joaquin Phoenix; Joker	Renée Zellweger; Judy	Brad Pitt; Once Upon a Time in Hollywood	Laura Dern; Marriage Story	Bong Joon-ho and Han Jin-won; Parasite	Taika Waititi; Jojo Rabbit	
35th Independent Spirit Awards	8 February 2020	The Farewell	Josh Safdie and Benny Safdie; Uncut Gems	Adam Sandler; Uncut Gems	Renée Zellweger; Judy	Willem Dafoe; The Lighthouse	Zhao Shu-zhen; The Farewell	Noah Baumbach; Marriage Story		
92nd Academy Awards	9 February 2020	Parasite	Bong Joon-ho; Parasite	Joaquin Phoenix; Joker	Renée Zellweger; Judy	Brad Pitt; Once Upon a Time in Hollywood	Laura Dern; Marriage Story	Bong Joon-ho and Han Jin-won; Parasite	Taika Waititi; Jojo Rabbit	

=== Guild awards ===
Award ceremony	Ceremony date	Main categories winner(s)	Ref.
70th American Cinema Editors Eddie Awards	17 January 2020	Best Edited Feature Film Dramatic: Yang Jin-mo – Parasite; Best Edited Feature Film Comedy: Tom Eagles – Jojo Rabbit	
67th Golden Reel Awards	19 January 2020	Sound Editing – Dialogue and ADR: Oliver Tarney and Rachael Tate – 1917	
34th American Society of Cinematographers Awards	25 January 2020	Outstanding Achievement in Cinematography: Roger Deakins – 1917	
56th Cinema Audio Society Awards	25 January 2020	Outstanding Achievement in Sound Mixing – Live Action: Ford v Ferrari; Outstanding Achievement in Sound Mixing – Animated: Toy Story 4	
22nd Costume Designers Guild Awards	28 January 2020	Contemporary Film: Jenny Eagan – Knives Out; Period Film: Mayes C. Rubeo – Jojo Rabbit; Sci-Fi/Fantasy Film: Ellen Mirojnick – Maleficent: Mistress of Evil	
18th Visual Effects Society Awards	29 January 2020	Outstanding Visual Effects in a Photoreal Feature: Robert Legato, Tom Peitzman, Adam Valdez, Andrew R. Jones – The Lion King	
24th Art Directors Guild Excellence in Production Design Awards	February 1, 2020	Contemporary Film: Lee Ha-Jun – Parasite; Fantasy Film: Charles Wood – Avengers: Endgame; Period Film: Barbara Ling – Once Upon a Time in Hollywood; Animated Film: Bob Pauley – Toy Story 4	
12th Make-Up Artists & Hair Stylists Guild Awards	16 February 2020	Contemporary Make-Up: Vivian Baker, Cristina Waltz, and Richard Redlefsen – Bombshell; Contemporary Hair Styling: Anne Morgan, Jaime Leigh McIntosh, and Adruitha Lee – Bombshell; Period and/or Character Make-Up: Nicki Ledermann, Tania Ribalow, and Sunday Englis – Joker; Period and/or Character Hair Styling: Anne Nosh Oldham, Elaine Browne, and Marc Pilcher – Downton Abbey	

=== Critics Prizes ===
Award dates	Ceremony	Best Film winner	Ref.
4 December 2019	85th New York Film Critics Circle Awards	The Irishman	
8 December 2019	45th Los Angeles Film Critics Association Awards	Parasite	
30 January 2020	40th London Film Critics' Circle Awards	Parasite	
