= 2023–24 film awards season =

Film awards for 2023

- Duration: 24 October 2023 – 14 April 2024

Film Awards seasons
- ← 2022–23 2024–25 →

The 2023–24 film awards season began in November 2023 with the 33rd Annual Gotham Awards and ended in April 2024 with the 76th Writers Guild of America Awards.

== Award ceremonies ==
Award ceremony	Ceremony date	Best Picture	Best Director	Best Actor	Best Actress	Best Supporting Actor	Best Supporting Actress	Best Original Screenplay	Best Adapted Screenplay	Ref.
33rd Annual Gotham Awards	27 November 2023	Past Lives	—N/a	Lily Gladstone; The Unknown Country		Charles Melton; May December		Justine Triet and Arthur Harari; Anatomy of a Fall		
95th National Board of Review Awards	6 December 2023	Killers of the Flower Moon	Martin Scorsese; Killers of the Flower Moon	Paul Giamatti; The Holdovers	Lily Gladstone; Killers of the Flower Moon	Mark Ruffalo; Poor Things	Da'Vine Joy Randolph; The Holdovers	David Hemingson; The Holdovers	Tony McNamara; Poor Things	
58th National Society of Film Critics Awards	6 January 2024	Past Lives	Jonathan Glazer; The Zone of Interest	Andrew Scott; All of Us Strangers	Sandra Hüller; Anatomy of a Fall	Charles Melton; May December	Da'Vine Joy Randolph; The Holdovers	Samy Burch; May December		
81st Golden Globe Awards	7 January 2024	Oppenheimer (Drama); Poor Things (Musical or Comedy)	Christopher Nolan; Oppenheimer	Cillian Murphy (Drama); Oppenheimer; Paul Giamatti (Musical or Comedy); The Holdovers	Lily Gladstone (Drama); Killers of the Flower Moon; Emma Stone (Musical or Comedy); Poor Things	Robert Downey Jr. Oppenheimer	Da'Vine Joy Randolph; The Holdovers	Justine Triet and Arthur Harari; Anatomy of a Fall		
29th Critics' Choice Awards	14 January 2024	Oppenheimer	Christopher Nolan; Oppenheimer	Paul Giamatti; The Holdovers	Emma Stone; Poor Things	Robert Downey Jr. Oppenheimer	Da'Vine Joy Randolph; The Holdovers	Greta Gerwig and Noah Baumbach; Barbie	Cord Jefferson; American Fiction	
13th AACTA International Awards	10 February 2024	Barbie	Christopher Nolan; Oppenheimer	Cillian Murphy; Oppenheimer	Margot Robbie; Barbie	Ryan Gosling; Barbie	Vanessa Kirby; Napoleon	Tony McNamara; Poor Things		
76th Directors Guild of America Awards	10 February 2024	—N/a	Christopher Nolan; Oppenheimer	—N/a						
77th British Academy Film Awards	18 February 2024	Oppenheimer	Christopher Nolan; Oppenheimer	Cillian Murphy; Oppenheimer	Emma Stone; Poor Things	Robert Downey Jr. Oppenheimer	Da'Vine Joy Randolph; The Holdovers	Justine Triet and Arthur Harari; Anatomy of a Fall	Cord Jefferson; American Fiction	
30th Screen Actors Guild Awards 35th Producers Guild of America Awards	24–25 February 2024	Oppenheimer	—N/a	Cillian Murphy; Oppenheimer	Lily Gladstone; Killers of the Flower Moon	Robert Downey Jr. Oppenheimer	Da'Vine Joy Randolph; The Holdovers	—N/a		
39th Independent Spirit Awards	25 February 2024	Past Lives	Celine Song; Past Lives	Jeffrey Wright; American Fiction		Da'Vine Joy Randolph; The Holdovers		Cord Jefferson; American Fiction		
28th Satellite Awards	3 March 2024	Oppenheimer (Drama); The Holdovers(Musical or Comedy)	Christopher Nolan; Oppenheimer	Cillian Murphy; Oppenheimer (Drama); Oppenheimer; Paul Giamatti (Musical or Comedy); The Holdovers	Lily Gladstone (Drama); Killers of the Flower Moon; Emma Stone (Musical or Comedy); Poor Things	Mark Ruffalo; Poor Things	Da'Vine Joy Randolph; The Holdovers	Bradley Cooper and Josh Singer; Maestro	Cord Jefferson; American Fiction	
96th Academy Awards	10 March 2024	Oppenheimer	Christopher Nolan; Oppenheimer	Cillian Murphy; Oppenheimer	Emma Stone; Poor Things	Robert Downey Jr. Oppenheimer	Da'Vine Joy Randolph; The Holdovers	Justine Triet and Arthur Harari; Anatomy of a Fall	Cord Jefferson; American Fiction	
76th Writers Guild of America Awards	14 April 2024	—N/a						David Hemingson; The Holdovers	Cord Jefferson; American Fiction	

=== Technical Guild awards ===
Award ceremony	Ceremony date	Main categories winner(s)	Ref.
38th American Society of Cinematographers Awards	3 March 2024	Outstanding Achievement in Cinematography: Hoyte van Hoytema – Oppenheimer	

=== Critics awards ===
Award dates	Ceremony	Best Film winner	Ref.
30 November 2023	89th New York Film Critics Circle Awards	Killers of the Flower Moon	
10 December 2023	49th Los Angeles Film Critics Association Awards	The Zone of Interest	
4 February 2024	44th London Film Critics' Circle Awards	The Zone of Interest	
