= 2012–13 film awards season =

Film awards for 2012

- Duration: 18 October 2012 – 24 February 2013

Film Awards seasons
- ← 2011–12 2013–14 →

The 2012–13 film awards season began in November 2012 and ended in February 2013.

== Awards ceremonies ==
Award ceremony	Ceremony date	Best Film	Best Director	Best Actor	Best Actress	Best Supporting Actor	Best Supporting Actress	Best Original Screenplay	Best Adapted Screenplay	Ref.
22nd Annual Gotham Independent Film Awards	26 November 2012	Moonrise Kingdom	—N/a							
17th Satellite Awards	16 December 2012	Silver Linings Playbook	David O. Russell; Silver Linings Playbook	Bradley Cooper; Silver Linings Playbook	Jennifer Lawrence; Silver Linings Playbook	Javier Bardem; Skyfall	Anne Hathaway; Les Miserables	Mark Boal; Zero Dark Thirty	David Magee; Life of Pi	
47th National Society of Film Critics Awards	5 January 2013	Amour	Michael Haneke; Amour	Daniel Day-Lewis; Lincoln	Emmanuelle Riva; Amour	Matthew McConaughey; Bernie and Magic Mike	Amy Adams; The Master	Tony Kushner; Lincoln		
84th National Board of Review Awards	8 January 2013	Zero Dark Thirty	Kathryn Bigelow; Silver Linings Playbook	Bradley Cooper; Silver Linings Playbook	Jessica Chastain; Zero Dark Thirty	Leonardo DiCaprio; Django Unchained	Ann Dowd; Compliance	Rian Johnson; Looper	David O. Russell; Silver Linings Playbook	
18th Critics' Choice Awards	10 January 2013	Argo	Ben Affleck; Argo	Daniel Day-Lewis; Lincoln	Jessica Chastain; Zero Dark Thirty	Philip Seymour Hoffman; The Master	Anne Hathaway; Les Miserables	Quentin Tarantino; Django Unchained	Tony Kushner; Lincoln	
70th Golden Globe Awards	13 January 2013	Argo (Drama); Les Miserables (Musical/Comedy)	Ben Affleck; Argo	Daniel Day-Lewis (Drama); Lincoln; Hugh Jackman (Musical/Comedy); Les Miserables	Jessica Chastain (Drama); Zero Dark Thirty; Jennifer Lawrence (Musical/Comedy); Silver Linings Playbook	Christoph Waltz; Django Unchained	Anne Hathaway; Les Miserables	Quentin Tarantino; Django Unchained		
2nd AACTA International Awards	26 January 2013	Silver Linings Playbook	David O. Russell; Silver Linings Playbook	Daniel Day-Lewis; Lincoln	Jennifer Lawrence; Silver Linings Playbook	Robert De Niro; Silver Linings Playbook	Jacki Weaver; Silver Linings Playbook	Quentin Tarantino; Django Unchained		
24th Producers Guild of America Awards	26 January 2013	Argo	—N/a							
19th Screen Actors Guild Awards	27 January 2013	(Ensemble Cast); Argo	—N/a	Daniel Day-Lewis; Lincoln	Jennifer Lawrence; Silver Linings Playbook	Tommy Lee Jones; Lincoln	Anne Hathaway; Les Miserables	—N/a		
65th Directors Guild of America Awards	2 February 2013	—N/a	Ben Affleck; Argo	—N/a						
66th British Academy Film Awards	10 February 2013	Argo	Ben Affleck; Argo	Daniel Day-Lewis; Lincoln	Emmanuella Riva; Amour	Christoph Waltz; Django Unchained	Anne Hathaway; Les Miserables	Quentin Tarantino; Django Unchained	David O. Russell; Silver Linings Playbook	
65th Writers Guild of America Awards	17 February 2013	—N/a						Mark Boal; Zero Dark Thirty	Chris Terrio; Argo	
28th Independent Spirit Awards	23 February 2013	Silver Linings Playbook	David O. Russell; Silver Linings Playbook	John Hawkes; The Sessions	Jennifer Lawrence; Silver Linings Playbook	Matthew McConaughey; Magic Mike	Helen Hunt; The Sessions	David O. Russell; Silver Linings Playbook		
85th Academy Awards	24 February 2013	Argo	Ang Lee; Life of Pi	Daniel Day-Lewis; Lincoln	Jennifer Lawrence; Silver Linings Playbook	Christoph Waltz; Django Unchained	Anne Hathaway; Les Miserables	Quentin Tarantino; Django Unchained	Chris Terrio; Argo	

=== Critics Prizes ===
Award dates	Ceremony	Best Film winner	Ref.
3 December 2012	78th New York Film Critics Circle Awards	Zero Dark Thirty	
9 December 2012	38th Los Angeles Film Critics Association Awards	Amour	
20 January 2013	33rd London Film Critics Circle Awards	Amour	

== Films by awards gained ==
Films	Academy Awards		BAFTA Awards		Golden Globe Awards		Guild Awards		Critics' Choice Awards		Satellite Awards		Total	
Films	Noms	Wins	Noms	Wins	Noms	Wins	Noms	Wins	Noms	Wins	Noms	Wins	Noms	Wins
A Royal Affair	1		—N/a	—N/a	1		—N/a	—N/a	—N/a	—N/a	3	1	5	1
Argo	7	3	7	3	5	2	7	4	7	2	4	1	44	15
Amour	5	1	4	2	1	1	—N/a	—N/a	2	1	2		14	5
Anna Karenina	4	1	6	1	1		—N/a	—N/a	2	2	6		19	4
Avengers Assemble	1		1		—N/a	—N/a	—N/a	—N/a	3		—N/a	—N/a	5	0
Beasts of the Southern Wild	4		1		—N/a	—N/a	2		3		3		13	0
Cloud Atlas	—N/a	—N/a	—N/a	—N/a	1		2		3	1	3		9	1
Django Unchained	5	2	5	2	5	2	2		2	1	—N/a	—N/a	19	7
Flight	2		—N/a	—N/a	1		3		2		6	1	14	1
Les Misérables	8	3	9	4	4	3	8	1	11	1	11	4	51	17
Life of Pi	11	4	9	2	3		4	1	9	2	5	2	41	11
Lincoln	12	2	10	1	7	1	8	3	13	3	8	1	58	11
Looper	—N/a	—N/a	—N/a	—N/a	—N/a	—N/a	—N/a	—N/a	5	1	—N/a	—N/a	5	1
Moonrise Kingdom	1		1		1		3		5		2		13	0
Rust and Bone	—N/a	—N/a	2		2		1		2		—N/a	—N/a	7	0
Silver Linings Playbook	8	1	3	1	4	1	5	1	10	4	7	5	37	13
Skyfall	5	2	8	2	1	1	5	3	7	3	7	1	33	12
The Dark Knight Rises	—N/a	—N/a	1		—N/a	—N/a	2		4		2		9	0
The Hobbit: An Unexpected Journey	3		3		—N/a	—N/a	5		4		—N/a	—N/a	15	0
The Impossible	1		—N/a	—N/a	1		2		2		—N/a	—N/a	6	0
The Master	3		4		3		2		7		7		26	0
The Sessions	1		1		2		2		2		6		14	0
Zero Dark Thirty	5		5		4		3	1	5		5	1	27	2

== See also ==
- Film awards seasons
