= 2018–19 film awards season =

- Duration: 18 October 2018 – 24 February 2019

Film Awards seasons
- ← 2017–18 2019–20 →

The 2018–19 film awards season began in November 2018 with the Gotham Independent Film Awards 2018 and ended in February 2019 with the 91st Academy Awards. Major winners for the year included Roma, Green Book, Bohemian Rhapsody, and The Favourite, among others.

== Award ceremonies ==
Award ceremony	Ceremony date	Best Picture	Best Director	Best Actor	Best Actress	Best Supporting Actor	Best Supporting Actress	Best Original Screenplay	Best Adapted Screenplay	Ref.
28th Gotham Independent Film Awards	26 November 2018	The Rider	—N/a	Ethan Hawke; First Reformed	Toni Collette; Hereditary	—N/a		Paul Schrader; First Reformed		
90th National Board of Review Awards	27 November 2018	Green Book	Bradley Cooper; A Star Is Born	Viggo Mortensen; Green Book	Lady Gaga; A Star Is Born	Sam Elliott; A Star Is Born	Regina King; If Beale Street Could Talk	Paul Schrader; First Reformed	Barry Jenkins; If Beale Street Could Talk	
8th AACTA International Awards	5 January 2019	Roma	Alfonso Cuarón; Roma	Rami Malek; Bohemian Rhapsody	Olivia Colman; The Favourite	Mahershala Ali; Green Book	Nicole Kidman; Boy Erased	Deborah Davis and Tony McNamara; The Favourite		
53rd National Society of Film Critics Awards	5 January 2019	The Rider	Alfonso Cuarón; Roma	Ethan Hawke; First Reformed	Olivia Colman; The Favourite	Steven Yeun; Burning	Regina King; If Beale Street Could Talk	Armando Iannucci, David Schneider and Ian Martin; The Death of Stalin		
76th Golden Globe Awards	6 January 2019	Bohemian Rhapsody (Drama); Green Book (Musical or Comedy)	Alfonso Cuarón; Roma	Rami Malek (Drama); Bohemian Rhapsody; Christian Bale (Musical or Comedy); Vice	Glenn Close (Drama); The Wife; Olivia Colman (Musical or Comedy); The Favourite	Mahershala Ali; Green Book	Regina King; If Beale Street Could Talk	Nick Vallelonga, Brian Currie and Peter Farrelly; Green Book		
24th Critics' Choice Awards	13 January 2019	Roma	Alfonso Cuarón; Roma	Rami Malek; Bohemian Rhapsody	Glenn Close; The Wife; Lady Gaga; A Star Is Born	Mahershala Ali; Green Book	Regina King; If Beale Street Could Talk	Nick Vallelonga, Brian Currie and Peter Farrelly; Green Book		
30th Producers 25th Screen Actors 71st Directors Guild of America Awards	19, 27 January, 2 February 2019	Green Book	Alfonso Cuarón; Roma	Rami Malek; Bohemian Rhapsody	Glenn Close; The Wife	Mahershala Ali; Green Book	Emily Blunt; A Quiet Place	—N/a		
72nd British Academy Film Awards	10 February 2019	Roma	Alfonso Cuarón; Roma	Rami Malek; Bohemian Rhapsody	Olivia Colman; The Favourite	Mahershala Ali; Green Book	Rachel Weisz; The Favourite	Deborah Davis and Tony McNamara; The Favourite	Charlie Wachtel, David Rabinowitz, Kevin Willmott and Spike Lee; BlacKkKlansman	
71st Writers Guild of America Awards	17 February 2019	—N/a						Bo Burnham; Eighth Grade	Nicole Holofcener and Jeff Whitty; Can You Ever Forgive Me?	
23rd Satellite Awards	22 February 2019	If Beale Street Could Talk (Drama); A Star Is Born (Comedy/Musical)	Alfonso Cuarón; Roma	Willem Dafoe (Drama); At Eternity's Gate; Rami Malek (Comedy/Musical); Bohemian Rhapsody	Glenn Close (Drama); The Wife; Olivia Colman (Comedy/Musical); The Favourite	Richard E. Grant; Can You Ever Forgive Me?	Regina King; If Beale Street Could Talk	Alfonso Cuarón; Roma	Nicole Holofcener and Jeff Whitty; Can You Ever Forgive Me?	
34th Independent Spirit Awards	23 February 2019	If Beale Street Could Talk	Barry Jenkins; If Beale Street Could Talk	Ethan Hawke; First Reformed	Glenn Close; The Wife	Richard E. Grant; Can You Ever Forgive Me?	Regina King; If Beale Street Could Talk	Nicole Holofcener and Jeff Whitty; Can You Ever Forgive Me?		
91st Academy Awards	24 February 2019	Green Book	Alfonso Cuarón; Roma	Rami Malek; Bohemian Rhapsody	Olivia Colman; The Favourite	Mahershala Ali; Green Book	Regina King; If Beale Street Could Talk	Nick Vallelonga, Brian Currie and Peter Farrelly; Green Book	Charlie Wachtel, David Rabinowitz, Kevin Willmott and Spike Lee; BlacKkKlansman	

=== Technical Guild awards ===
Award ceremony	Ceremony date	Main categories winner(s)	Ref.
69th American Cinema Editors Eddie Awards	1 February 2019	Best Edited Feature Film Dramatic: John Ottman – Bohemian Rhapsody; Best Edited Feature Film Comedy: Yorgos Mavropsaridis – The Favourite	
23rd Art Directors Guild Excellence in Production Design Awards	2 February 2019	Contemporary Film: Nelson Coates – Crazy Rich Asians; Fantasy Film: Hannah Beachler – Black Panther; Period Film: Fiona Crombie – The Favourite; Animated Film: Adam Stockhausen and Paul Harrod – Isle of Dogs	
17th Visual Effects Society Awards	5 February 2019	Outstanding Visual Effects: Daniel DeLeeuw, Jen Underdahl, Kelly Port, Matt Aitken, Dan Sudick – Avengers: Infinity War	
33rd American Society of Cinematographers Awards	9 February 2019	Outstanding Achievement in Cinematography: Łukasz Żal – Cold War	
55th Cinema Audio Society Awards	16 February 2019	Outstanding Achievement in Sound Mixing – Live Action: Bohemian Rhapsody; Outstanding Achievement in Sound Mixing – Animated: Isle of Dogs	
21st Costume Designers Guild Awards	19 February 2019	Contemporary Film: Mary E. Vogt – Crazy Rich Asians; Period Film: Sandy Powell – The Favourite; Sci-Fi/Fantasy Film: Ruth E. Carter – Black Panther	

=== Critics Prizes ===
Award dates	Ceremony	Best Film winner	Ref.
29 November 2018	88th New York Film Critics Circle Awards	Roma	
8 December 2018	31st Chicago Film Critics Association Awards	Roma	
9 December 2018	44th Los Angeles Film Critics Association Awards	Roma	
9 December 2018	22nd Toronto Film Critics Association Awards	Roma	
16 December 2018	39th Boston Society of Film Critics Awards	If Beale Street Could Talk	
20 January 2019	39th London Film Critics' Circle Awards	Roma	

== Films by awards gained ==
Major Awards and nominations received
Films	Academy Awards		BAFTA Awards		Golden Globe Awards		Guild Awards		Critics' Choice Awards		Satellite Awards		Total	
Films	Noms	Wins	Noms	Wins	Noms	Wins	Noms	Wins	Noms	Wins	Noms	Wins	Noms	Wins
A Quiet Place	1		1		1		7	2	3	1	2	1	15	4
A Star Is Born	8	1	7	1	5	1	16	1	9	2	11	3	56	9
Black Panther	7	3	1	1	3		10	4	12	3	7	1	40	12
BlacKkKlansman	6	1	5	1	4		10	1	4		7	1	36	4
Bohemian Rhapsody	5	4	7	2	2	2	9	4	3		1	1	27	13
Crazy Rich Asians	—N/a	—N/a	—N/a	—N/a	2		8	4	4	1	2		16	5
First Man	4	1	7		2	1	6		10	2	7		36	4
Green Book	5	3	4	1	5	3	8	3	7	1	5		34	11
If Beale Street Could Talk	3	1	2		3	1	2		5	2	7	2	22	6
Roma	10	3	7	4	3	2	6	1	8	4	8	4	42	18
The Favourite	10	1	12	7	5	1	10	3	14	2	9	2	60	16
Vice	8	1	6	1	6	1	9	3	9	3	—N/a	—N/a	38	9
