= 2021–22 film awards season =

Film awards for 2021

- Duration: 21 October 2021 – 27 March 2022

Film Awards seasons
- ← 2020–21 2022–23 →

The 2021–22 film awards season began in November 2021 with the Gotham Independent Film Awards 2021 and ended in March 2022 with the 94th Academy Awards.

== Award ceremonies ==
Award ceremony	Ceremony date	Best Picture	Best Director	Best Actor	Best Actress	Best Supporting Actor	Best Supporting Actress	Best Original Screenplay	Best Adapted Screenplay	Ref.
31st Annual Gotham Awards	29 November 2021	The Lost Daughter	—N/a	Frankie Faison; The Killing of Kenneth Chamberlain	Olivia Colman; The Lost Daughter	Troy Kotsur; CODA		Maggie Gyllenhaal; The Lost Daughter		
92nd National Board of Review Awards	2 December 2021	Licorice Pizza	Paul Thomas Anderson; Licorice Pizza	Will Smith; King Richard	Rachel Zegler; West Side Story	Ciarán Hinds; Belfast	Aunjanue Ellis-Taylor; King Richard	Asghar Farhadi; A Hero	Joel Coen; The Tragedy of Macbeth	
56th National Society of Film Critics Awards	8 January 2022	Drive My Car	Ryusuke Hamaguchi; Drive My Car and Wheel of Fortune and Fantasy	Hidetoshi Nishijima; Drive My Car	Penélope Cruz; Parallel Mothers	Anders Danielsen Lie; The Worst Person in the World	Ruth Negga; Passing	Ryusuke Hamaguchi and Takamasa Oe; Drive My Car		
79th Golden Globe Awards	9 January 2022	The Power of the Dog (Drama); West Side Story (Musical or Comedy)	Jane Campion; The Power of the Dog	Will Smith (Drama); King Richard; Andrew Garfield (Musical or Comedy); Tick, Tick... Boom!	Nicole Kidman (Drama); Being the Ricardos; Rachel Zegler (Musical or Comedy); West Side Story	Kodi Smit-McPhee; The Power of the Dog	Ariana DeBose; West Side Story	Kenneth Branagh; Belfast		
11th AACTA International Awards	26 January 2022	The Power of the Dog	Denis Villeneuve; Dune	Benedict Cumberbatch; The Power of the Dog	Nicole Kidman; Being the Ricardos	Kodi Smit-McPhee; The Power of the Dog	Judi Dench; Belfast	Aaron Sorkin; Being the Ricardos		
28th Screen Actors Guild Awards	27 February 2022	—N/a		Will Smith; King Richard	Jessica Chastain; The Eyes of Tammy Faye	Troy Kotsur; CODA	Ariana DeBose; West Side Story	—N/a		
37th Independent Spirit Awards	6 March 2022	The Lost Daughter	Maggie Gyllenhaal; The Lost Daughter	Simon Rex; Red Rocket	Taylour Paige; Zola	Troy Kotsur; CODA	Ruth Negga; Passing	Maggie Gyllenhaal; The Lost Daughter		
74th Directors Guild of America Awards	12 March 2022	—N/a	Jane Campion; The Power of the Dog	—N/a						
75th British Academy Film Awards	13 March 2022	The Power of the Dog	Jane Campion; The Power of the Dog	Will Smith; King Richard	Joanna Scanlan; After Love	Troy Kotsur; CODA	Ariana DeBose; West Side Story	Paul Thomas Anderson; Licorice Pizza	Sian Heder; CODA	
27th Critics' Choice Awards	13 March 2022	The Power of the Dog	Jane Campion; The Power of the Dog	Will Smith; King Richard	Jessica Chastain; The Eyes of Tammy Faye	Troy Kotsur; CODA	Ariana DeBose; West Side Story	Kenneth Branagh; Belfast	Jane Campion; The Power of the Dog	
33rd Producers Guild of America Awards 74th Writers Guild of America Awards	19–20 March 2022	CODA	—N/a					Adam McKay; Don't Look Up	Sian Heder; CODA	
94th Academy Awards	27 March 2022	CODA	Jane Campion; The Power of the Dog	Will Smith; King Richard	Jessica Chastain; The Eyes of Tammy Faye	Troy Kotsur; CODA	Ariana DeBose; West Side Story	Kenneth Branagh; Belfast	Sian Heder; CODA	
26th Satellite Awards	2 April 2022	Belfast (Drama); Tick, Tick... Boom! (Musical or Comedy)	Jane Campion; The Power of the Dog	Benedict Cumberbatch (Drama); The Power of the Dog; Andrew Garfield (Musical or Comedy); Tick, Tick... Boom!	Kristen Stewart (Drama); Spencer; Alana Haim (Musical or Comedy); Licorice Pizza	Kodi Smit-McPhee; The Power of the Dog	Kirsten Dunst; The Power of the Dog	Kenneth Branagh; Belfast	Sian Heder; CODA	

=== Other Awards ===
Category	34th European Film Awards 11 December 2021
Best Picture	Quo Vadis, Aida?
Ref.	

=== Guild awards ===
Award ceremony	Ceremony date	Main categories winner(s)	Ref.
12th Make-Up Artists & Hair Stylists Guild Awards	19 February 2022	Contemporary Make-Up: Merc Arceneaux, Vera Steimberg, Trent Simmons, and Caroline Monge – Coming 2 America; Contemporary Hair Styling: Stacey Morris, Carla Farmer, Louisa Anthony and Victor Paz – Coming 2 America; Period and/or Character Make-Up: Nadia Stacey, Naomi Donne and Guy Common – Cruella; Period and/or Character Hair Styling: Teressa Hill, Yvonne De Patis-Kupka, Lindy Dunn, and Kim Santantonio – Being the Ricardos	
2nd Set Decorators Society of America Awards	22 February 2022	Contemporary: Véronique Melery and Mark Tildesley – No Time to Die; Period: Ellen Brill and Jon Hutman – Being the Ricardos; Science Fiction or Fantasy: Zsuzsanna Sipos and Patrice Vermette – Dune; Comedy or Musical: Rena DeAngelo and Adam Stockhausen – The French Dispatch	
72nd American Cinema Editors Eddie Awards	5 March 2022	Dramatic: Pamela Martin – King Richard; Comedy: Myron Kerstein and Andrew Weisblum – tick, tick... BOOM!	
26th Art Directors Guild Excellence in Production Design Awards	5 March 2022	Contemporary: Mark Tildesley – No Time to Die; Period: Tamara Deverell – Nightmare Alley; Fantasy: Patrice Vermette – Dune; Animated: Ian Gooding and Lorelay Bové – Encanto	
20th Visual Effects Society Awards	8 March 2022	Outstanding Visual Effects in a Photoreal Feature: Paul Lambert, Brice Parker, Tristan Myles, Brian Connor and Gerd Nefzer – Dune	
24th Costume Designers Guild Awards	9 March 2022	Contemporary Film: Ruth E. Carter – Coming 2 America; Period Film: Jenny Beavan – Cruella; Sci-Fi/Fantasy Film: Jacqueline West and Robert Morgan – Dune	
69th Golden Reel Awards	13 March 2022	Sound Editing – Dialogue and ADR: Jill Purdy and Nelson Ferreira – Nightmare Alley	
58th Cinema Audio Society Awards	19 March 2022	Outstanding Achievement in Sound Mixing – Live Action: Mac Ruth, Ron Bartlett, Douglas Hemphill, Alan Meyerson, Tommy O'Connell and Don White – Dune	
36th American Society of Cinematographers Awards	20 March 2022	Outstanding Achievement in Cinematography: Greig Fraser – Dune	

=== Critics awards ===
Award dates	Ceremony	Best Film winner	Ref.
3 December 2021	87th New York Film Critics Circle Awards	Drive My Car	
6 December 2021	15th Detroit Film Critics Society Awards	Cyrano	
6 December 2021	20th Washington D.C. Area Film Critics Association Awards	Belfast	
12 December 2021	42nd Boston Society of Film Critics Awards	Drive My Car	
12 December 2021	21st New York Film Critics Online Awards	The Power of the Dog	
15 December 2021	34th Chicago Film Critics Association Awards	The Power of the Dog	
18 December 2021	47th Los Angeles Film Critics Association Awards	Drive My Car	
19 December 2021	18th St. Louis Film Critics Association Awards	Licorice Pizza	
20 December 2021	27th Dallas–Fort Worth Film Critics Association Awards	The Power of the Dog	
21 December 2021	16th Dublin Film Critics' Circle	The Power of the Dog	
22 December 2021	26th Florida Film Critics Circle Awards	The Power of the Dog	
10 January 2022	26th San Diego Film Critics Society Awards	The Power of the Dog	
10 January 2022	20th San Francisco Bay Area Film Critics Circle Awards	The Power of the Dog	
11 January 2022	17th Austin Film Critics Association Awards	The Power of the Dog	
13 January 2022	11th Georgia Film Critics Association Awards	Licorice Pizza	
16 January 2022	55th Kansas City Film Critics Circle Awards	The Power of the Dog	
16 January 2022	25th Toronto Film Critics Association Awards	Drive My Car	
17 January 2022	18th African-American Film Critics Association Awards	The Harder They Fall	
17 January 2022	6th Seattle Film Critics Society Awards	Drive My Car	
19 January 2022	15th Houston Film Critics Society Awards	The Power of the Dog	
24 January 2022	25th Online Film Critics Society Awards	The Power of the Dog	
25 January 2022	18th EDA Awards	The Power of the Dog	
6 February 2022	42nd London Film Critics' Circle Awards	The Power of the Dog	
28 February 2022	5th Hollywood Critics Association Film Awards	CODA	
7 March 2022	22nd Vancouver Film Critics Circle Awards	The Power of the Dog	
