= 2014–15 film awards season =

Film awards for 2014

- Duration: 23 October 2014 – 22 February 2015

Film Awards seasons
- ← 2013–14 2015–16 →

The 2014–15 film awards season began in December 2014 with the Gotham Independent Film Awards 2014 and ended in February 2015 with the 87th Academy Awards. Major winners for the year included The Grand Budapest Hotel, Birdman or (The Unexpected Virtue of Ignorance), Boyhood, Whiplash, and The Theory of Everything, among others.

== Award ceremonies ==
Award ceremony	Ceremony date	Best Film	Best Director	Best Actor	Best Actress	Best Supporting Actor	Best Supporting Actress	Best Original Screenplay	Best Adapted Screenplay	Ref.
24th Annual Gotham Independent Film Awards	1 December 2014	Birdman	—N/a	Michael Keaton; Birdman	Julianne Moore; Still Alice	—N/a				
87th National Board of Review Awards	1 December 2015	A Most Violent Year	Clint Eastwood; American Sniper	Oscar Isaac; A Most Violent Year; Michael Keaton; Birdman	Julianne Moore; Still Alice	Edward Norton; Birdman	Jessica Chastain; A Most Violent Year	Phil Lord and Christopher Miller; The Lego Movie	Paul Thomas Anderson; Inherent Vice	
49th National Society of Film Critics Awards	3 January 2015	Goodbye to Language	Richard Linklater; Boyhood	Timothy Spall; Mr. Turner	Marion Cotillard; The Immigrant and Two Days, One Night	J. K. Simmons; Whiplash	Patricia Arquette; Boyhood	Wes Anderson; The Grand Budapest Hotel		
72nd Golden Globe Awards	11 January 2015	Boyhood (Drama); The Grand Budapest Hotel (Musical or Comedy)	Richard Linklater; Boyhood	Eddie Redmayne (Drama); The Theory of Everything; Michael Keaton (Musical or Comedy); Birdman	Julianne Moore (Drama); Still Alice; Amy Adams (Musical or Comedy); Big Eyes	J. K. Simmons; Whiplash	Patricia Arquette; Boyhood	Alejandro G. Iñárritu, Nicolás Giacobone, Alexander Dinelaris Jr., and Armando Bó; Birdman		
20th Critics' Choice Awards	15 January 2015	Boyhood	Richard Linklater; Boyhood	Michael Keaton; Birdman	Julianne Moore; Still Alice	J. K. Simmons; Whiplash	Patricia Arquette; Boyhood	Alejandro G. Iñárritu, Nicolás Giacobone, Alexander Dinelaris Jr., and Armando Bó; Birdman	Gillian Flynn; Gone Girl	
26th Producers Guild of America Awards	24 January 2016	Birdman	—N/a							
21st Screen Actors Guild Awards	25 January 2015	Birdman (Ensemble Cast)	—N/a	Eddie Redmayne; The Theory of Everything	Julianne Moore; Still Alice	J. K. Simmons; Whiplash	Patricia Arquette; Boyhood	—N/a		
4th AACTA International Awards	31 January 2015	Birdman	Alejandro G. Iñárritu; Birdman	Michael Keaton; Birdman	Julianne Moore; Still Alice	J. K. Simmons; Whiplash	Patricia Arquette; Boyhood	Alejandro G. Iñárritu, Nicolás Giacobone, Alexander Dinelaris Jr., and Armando Bó; Birdman		
67th Directors Guild of America Awards	7 February 2015	—N/a	Alejandro G. Iñárritu; Birdman	—N/a						
68th British Academy Film Awards	8 February 2015	Boyhood	Richard Linklater; Boyhood	Eddie Redmayne; The Theory of Everything	Julianne Moore; Still Alice	J. K. Simmons; Whiplash	Patricia Arquette; Boyhood	Wes Anderson; The Grand Budapest Hotel	Anthony McCarten; The Theory of Everything	
67th Writers Guild of America Awards	14 February 2015	—N/a						Wes Anderson; The Grand Budapest Hotel	Graham Moore; The Imitation Game	
19th Satellite Awards	15 February 2015	Birdman	Richard Linklater; Boyhood	Michael Keaton; Birdman	Julianne Moore; Still Alice	J. K. Simmons; Whiplash	Patricia Arquette; Boyhood	Dan Gilroy; Nightcrawler	Graham Moore; The Imitation Game	
30th Independent Spirit Awards	21 February 2015	Birdman	Richard Linklater; Boyhood	Michael Keaton; Birdman	Julianne Moore; Still Alice	J. K. Simmons; Whiplash	Patricia Arquette; Boyhood	Dan Gilroy; Nightcrawler		
87th Academy Awards	22 February 2015	Birdman	Alejandro G. Iñárritu; Birdman	Eddie Redmayne; The Theory of Everything	Julianne Moore; Still Alice	J. K. Simmons; Whiplash	Patricia Arquette; Boyhood	Alejandro G. Iñárritu, Nicolás Giacobone, Alexander Dinelaris Jr., and Armando Bó; Birdman	Graham Moore; The Imitation Game	

== Films by awards gained ==
Major Awards and nominations received
Films	Academy Awards		BAFTA Awards		Golden Globe Awards		Guild Awards		Critics' Choice Awards		Satellite Awards		Total	
Films	Noms	Wins	Noms	Wins	Noms	Wins	Noms	Wins	Noms	Wins	Noms	Wins	Noms	Wins
American Sniper	6	1	2		—N/a	—N/a	4		2	1	2		16	2
Big Eyes	—N/a	—N/a	2		3	1	—N/a	—N/a	1		—N/a	—N/a	6	1
Birdman	9	4	10	1	7	2	9	6	13	7	10	3	58	23
Boyhood	6	1	5	3	5	3	7	1	8	4	7	2	38	14
Dawn of the Planet of the Apes	1		1		—N/a	—N/a	1		2	1	3	2	8	3
Foxcatcher	5		2		3		6		2		2		20	0
Gone Girl	1		2		4		5		6	1	7		25	1
Guardians of the Galaxy	2		2		—N/a	—N/a	7	4	5	2	1		17	6
Ida	2		2	1	1		—N/a	—N/a	1		1		5	1
Inherent Vice	2		—N/a	—N/a	1		2		4		3		17	0
Interstellar	5	1	4	1	1		3		7	1	3		23	3
Into the Woods	3		2		3		3	1	5		4	1	20	2
Mr. Turner	4		4		—N/a	—N/a	—N/a	—N/a	2		2	1	12	1
Nightcrawler	1		4		1		4		3		2	1	15	1
Paddington	—N/a	—N/a	2		—N/a	—N/a	—N/a	—N/a	—N/a	—N/a	—N/a	—N/a	2	0
Pride	—N/a	—N/a	3	1	1		—N/a	—N/a	—N/a	—N/a	—N/a	—N/a	4	1
Selma	2	1	—N/a	—N/a	4	1	1		5	1	4		16	3
Still Alice	1	1	1	1	1	1	1	1	1	1	1	1	6	6
The Grand Budapest Hotel	9	4	11	5	4	1	3	2	11	3	3	2	41	17
The Imitation Game	8	1	9		5		8	1	6		8	1	44	3
The Theory of Everything	5	1	10	3	4	2	6	1	5		5		35	7
Unbroken	3		—N/a	—N/a	—N/a	—N/a	3	1	4		—N/a	—N/a	10	1
Virunga	1		1		—N/a	—N/a	1		—N/a	—N/a	2	1	5	1
Whiplash	5	3	5	3	1	1	3	1	4	1	5	2	23	11
Wild	2		1		1		3	1	2		3		12	1
Under the Skin	—N/a	—N/a	2		—N/a	—N/a	—N/a	—N/a	1		—N/a	—N/a	3	0

=== Critics Prizes ===
Award dates	Ceremony	Best Film winner	Ref.
1 December 2014	80th New York Film Critics Circle Awards	Boyhood	
7 December 2014	40th Los Angeles Film Critics Association Awards	Boyhood	
18 January 2015	35th London Film Critics Circle Awards	Boyhood	
