= 2013–14 film awards season =

Film awards for 2013

- Duration: 24 October 2013 – 2 March 2014

Film Awards seasons
- ← 2012–13 2014–15 →

The 2013–14 film awards season began in November 2013 with the Gotham Independent Film Awards 2013 and ended in March 2014 with the 86th Academy Awards. Major winners for the year included 12 Years a Slave, Gravity, Dallas Buyers Club, American Hustle, Blue Jasmine, and Her, among others.

== Award ceremonies ==
Award ceremony	Ceremony date	Best Film	Best Director	Best Actor	Best Actress	Best Supporting Actor	Best Supporting Actress	Best Original Screenplay	Best Adapted Screenplay	Ref.
23rd Annual Gotham Independent Film Awards	2 December 2013	Inside Llewyn Davis	—N/a	Matthew McConaughey; Dallas Buyers Club	Brie Larson; Short Term 12	—N/a				
85th National Board of Review Awards	4 December 2013	Her	Spike Jonze; Her	Bruce Dern; Nebraska	Emma Thompson; Saving Mr. Banks	Will Forte; Nebraska	Octavia Spencer; Fruitvale Station	Joel and Ethan Coen; Inside Llewyn Davis	Terence Winter; The Wolf of Wall Street	
48th National Society of Film Critics Awards	4 January 2014	Inside Llewyn Davis	Joel and Ethan Coen; Inside Llewyn Davis	Oscar Isaac; Inside Llewyn Davis	Cate Blanchett; Blue Jasmine	James Franco; Spring Breakers	Jennifer Lawrence; American Hustle	Richard Linklater, Ethan Hawke and Julie Delpy; Before Midnight		
3rd AACTA International Awards	10 January 2014	Gravity	Alfonso Cuarón; Gravity	Chiwetel Ejiofor; 12 Years a Slave	Cate Blanchett; Blue Jasmine	Michael Fassbender; 12 Years a Slave	Jennifer Lawrence; American Hustle	Eric Warren Singer and David O. Russell; American Hustle		
71st Golden Globe Awards	12 January 2014	12 Years a Slave (Drama); American Hustle (Musical/Comedy)	Alfonso Cuarón; Gravity	Matthew McConaughey (Drama); Dallas Buyers Club; Leonardo DiCaprio (Musical/Comedy); The Wolf of Wall Street	Cate Blanchett (Drama); Blue Jasmine; Amy Adams (Musical/Comedy); American Hustle	Jared Leto; Dallas Buyers Club	Jennifer Lawrence; American Hustle	Spike Jonze; Her		
19th Critics' Choice Awards	16 January 2014	12 Years a Slave	Alfonso Cuarón; Gravity	Matthew McConaughey; Dallas Buyers Club	Cate Blanchett; Blue Jasmine	Jared Leto; Dallas Buyers Club	Lupita Nyong'o; 12 Years a Slave	Spike Jonze; Her	John Ridley; 12 Years a Slave	
20th Screen Actors Guild Awards	18 January 2014	American Hustle (Ensemble Cast)	—N/a	Matthew McConaughey; Dallas Buyers Club	Cate Blanchett; Blue Jasmine	Jared Leto; Dallas Buyers Club	Lupita Nyong'o; 12 Years a Slave	—N/a		
25th Producers Guild of America Awards	19 January 2015	12 Years a Slave; Gravity	—N/a							
66th Directors Guild of America Awards	25 January 2014	—N/a	Alfonso Cuarón; Gravity	—N/a						
66th Writers Guild of America Awards	1 February 2014	—N/a						Spike Jonze; Her	Billy Ray; Captain Phillips	
67th British Academy Film Awards	16 February 2014	12 Years a Slave	Alfonso Cuarón; Gravity	Chiwetel Ejiofor; 12 Years a Slave	Cate Blanchett; Blue Jasmine	Barkhad Abdi; Captain Phillips	Jennifer Lawrence; American Hustle	Eric Warren Singer and David O. Russell; American Hustle	Steve Coogan and Jeff Pope; Philomena	
18th Satellite Awards	23 February 2014	12 Years a Slave	Steve McQueen; 12 Years a Slave	Matthew McConaughey; Dallas Buyers Club	Cate Blanchett; Blue Jasmine	Jared Leto; Dallas Buyers Club	June Squibb; Nebraska	Eric Warren Singer and David O. Russell; American Hustle	Steve Coogan and Jeff Pope; Philomena	
29th Independent Spirit Awards	1 March 2014	12 Years a Slave	Steve McQueen; 12 Years a Slave	Matthew McConaughey; Dallas Buyers Club	Cate Blanchett; Blue Jasmine	Jared Leto; Dallas Buyers Club	Lupita Nyong'o; 12 Years a Slave	John Ridley; 12 Years a Slave		
86th Academy Awards	2 March 2014	12 Years a Slave	Alfonso Cuarón; Gravity	Matthew McConaughey; Dallas Buyers Club	Cate Blanchett; Blue Jasmine	Jared Leto; Dallas Buyers Club	Lupita Nyong'o; 12 Years a Slave	Spike Jonze; Her	John Ridley; 12 Years a Slave	

=== Critics Prizes ===
Award dates	Ceremony	Best Film winner	Ref.
3 December 2013	79th New York Film Critics Circle Awards	American Hustle	
8 December 2013	39th Los Angeles Film Critics Association Awards	Gravity and Her	
2 February 2014	34th London Film Critics Circle Awards	12 Years a Slave	

== Films by awards gained ==
Major Awards and nominations received
Films	Academy Awards		BAFTA Awards		Golden Globe Awards		Guild Awards		Critics' Choice Awards		Satellite Awards		Total	
Films	Noms	Wins	Noms	Wins	Noms	Wins	Noms	Wins	Noms	Wins	Noms	Wins	Noms	Wins
12 Years a Slave	9	3	10	2	7	1	8	3	13	3	10	2	57	14
All Is Lost	1		—N/a	—N/a	2	1	—N/a	—N/a	1		4		8	1
American Hustle	10		10	3	7	3	7	1	13	4	8	2	55	13
August: Osage County	2		1		2		5		3		2		15	0
Before Midnight	1		—N/a	—N/a	1		1		1		1		5	0
Behind the Candelabra	—N/a	—N/a	5		—N/a	—N/a	—N/a	—N/a	—N/a	—N/a	—N/a	—N/a	5	0
Blue Is the Warmest Colour	—N/a	—N/a	2		1		—N/a	—N/a	2	2	3		8	2
Blue Jasmine	3	1	3	1	2	1	5	2	2	1	5	1	20	7
Captain Phillips	6		9	1	4		5		6		5		35	1
Dallas Buyers Club	6	3	—N/a	—N/a	2	2	6	2	3	2	2	2	19	11
Frozen	2	2	1	1	2	1	1	1	2	2	2		10	7
Gravity	10	7	11	6	4	1	4	3	10	7	8	3	47	27
Her	5	1	—N/a	—N/a	3	1	4	2	6	1	2		20	5
Inside Llewyn Davis	2		3		3		1		4		6	1	19	1
Mandela: Long Walk to Freedom	1		—N/a	—N/a	3	1	—N/a	—N/a	1		—N/a	—N/a	5	1
Nebraska	6		3		5		7		6		3	2	30	2
Philomena	4		4	1	3		3		2		4	1	20	2
Rush	—N/a	—N/a	4	1	2		2		4		7		19	1
Saving Mr. Banks	1		5		1		5		4		6		22	0
The Great Gatsby	2	2	3	2	—N/a	—N/a	2	1	3	2	3	2	13	9
The Hobbit: The Desolation of Smaug	3		2		—N/a	—N/a	2		5		1		13	0
The Wolf of Wall Street	5		4		2	1	4		6	1	5		26	2
