= 2024–25 film awards season =

Film awards for 2024

- Duration: 29 October 2024 – 2 March 2025

Film Awards seasons
- ← 2023–24 2025–26 →

The 2024–25 film awards season began on 29 October 2024 with the 34th Annual Gotham Awards and ended in March 2025 with the 97th Academy Awards.

== Award ceremonies ==
Award ceremony	Ceremony date	Best Picture	Best Director	Best Actor	Best Actress	Best Supporting Actor	Best Supporting Actress	Best Original Screenplay	Best Adapted Screenplay	Ref.
34th Annual Gotham Awards	2 December 2024	A Different Man	RaMell Ross; Nickel Boys	Colman Domingo; Sing Sing		Clarence Maclin; Sing Sing		Azazel Jacobs; His Three Daughters		
96th National Board of Review Awards	4 December 2024	Wicked	Jon M. Chu; Wicked	Daniel Craig; Queer	Nicole Kidman; Babygirl	Kieran Culkin; A Real Pain	Elle Fanning; A Complete Unknown	Mike Leigh; Hard Truths	Clint Bentley and Greg Kwedar; Sing Sing	
59th National Society of Film Critics Awards	4 January 2025	Nickel Boys	Payal Kapadia; All We Imagine as Light	Colman Domingo; Sing Sing	Marianne Jean-Baptiste; Hard Truths	Kieran Culkin; A Real Pain	Michele Austin; Hard Truths	Jesse Eisenberg; A Real Pain		
82nd Golden Globe Awards	5 January 2025	The Brutalist (Drama); Emilia Pérez (Musical or Comedy)	Brady Corbet; The Brutalist	Adrien Brody (Drama); The Brutalist; Sebastian Stan (Musical or Comedy); A Different Man	Fernanda Torres (Drama); I'm Still Here; Demi Moore (Musical or Comedy); The Substance	Kieran Culkin; A Real Pain	Zoe Saldaña; Emilia Pérez	Peter Straughan; Conclave		
29th Satellite Awards	26 January 2025	The Brutalist (Drama); Anora (Musical or Comedy)	Brady Corbet; The Brutalist	Colman Domingo (Drama); Sing Sing; Keith Kupferer (Musical or Comedy); Ghostlight	Fernanda Torres (Drama); I'm Still Here; Demi Moore (Musical or Comedy); The Substance	Guy Pearce; The Brutalist	Ariana Grande; Wicked	Jesse Eisenberg; A Real Pain	RaMell Ross and Joslyn Barnes; Nickel Boys	
14th AACTA International Awards	7 February 2025	Better Man	Michael Gracey; Better Man	Ralph Fiennes; Conclave	Nicole Kidman; Babygirl	Guy Pearce; The Brutalist	Zoe Saldaña; Emilia Pérez	Jesse Eisenberg; A Real Pain		
30th Critics' Choice Awards	7 February 2025	Anora	Jon M. Chu; Wicked	Adrien Brody; The Brutalist	Demi Moore; The Substance	Kieran Culkin; A Real Pain	Zoe Saldaña; Emilia Pérez	Coralie Fargeat; The Substance	Peter Straughan; Conclave	
36th Producers 77th Directors 77th Writers Guild of America Awards	8, 15 February 2025	Anora	Sean Baker; Anora	—N/a				Sean Baker; Anora	RaMell Ross and Joslyn Barnes; Nickel Boys	
78th British Academy Film Awards	16 February 2025	Conclave	Brady Corbet; The Brutalist	Adrien Brody; The Brutalist	Mikey Madison; Anora	Kieran Culkin; A Real Pain	Zoe Saldaña; Emilia Pérez	Jesse Eisenberg; A Real Pain	Peter Straughan; Conclave	
40th Independent Spirit Awards	22 February 2025	Anora	Sean Baker; Anora	Mikey Madison; Anora		Kieran Culkin; A Real Pain		Jesse Eisenberg; A Real Pain		
31st Screen Actors Guild Awards	23 February 2025	—N/a		Timothée Chalamet; A Complete Unknown	Demi Moore; The Substance	Kieran Culkin; A Real Pain	Zoe Saldaña; Emilia Pérez	—N/a		<
97th Academy Awards	2 March 2025	Anora	Sean Baker; Anora	Adrien Brody; The Brutalist	Mikey Madison; Anora	Kieran Culkin; A Real Pain	Zoe Saldaña; Emilia Pérez	Sean Baker; Anora	Peter Straughan; Conclave	

=== Technical Guild awards ===
Award ceremony	Ceremony date	Main categories winner(s)	Ref.
39th American Society of Cinematographers Awards	23 February 2025	Outstanding Achievement in Cinematography: Edward Lachman – Maria	

=== Critics awards ===
Award dates	Ceremony	Best Film winner	Ref.
3 December 2024	90th New York Film Critics Circle Awards	The Brutalist	
8 December 2024	50th Los Angeles Film Critics Association Awards	Anora	
2 February 2025	45th London Film Critics' Circle Awards	The Brutalist	
