= 2017–18 film awards season =

Film awards for 2017

- Duration: 19 October 2017 – 4 March 2018

Film Awards seasons
- ← 2016–17 2018–19 →

The 2017–18 film awards season began in November 2017 with the Gotham Independent Film Awards 2017 and ended in March 2018 with the 90th Academy Awards.

== Award ceremonies ==
Award ceremony	Ceremony date	Best Picture	Best Director	Best Actor	Best Actress	Best Supporting Actor	Best Supporting Actress	Best Original Screenplay	Best Adapted Screenplay	Ref.
27th Gotham Independent Film Awards	27 November 2017	Call Me by Your Name	—N/a	James Franco; The Disaster Artist	Saoirse Ronan; Lady Bird	—N/a		Jordan Peele; Get Out		
89th National Board of Review Awards	28 November 2017	The Post	Greta Gerwig; Lady Bird	Tom Hanks; The Post	Meryl Streep; The Post	Willem Dafoe; The Florida Project	Laurie Metcalf; Lady Bird	Paul Thomas Anderson; Phantom Thread		
7th AACTA International Awards	5 January 2018	Three Billboards Outside Ebbing, Missouri	Christopher Nolan; Dunkirk	Gary Oldman; Darkest Hour	Margot Robbie; I, Tonya	Sam Rockwell; Three Billboards Outside Ebbing, Missouri	Allison Janney; I, Tonya	Martin McDonagh; Three Billboards Outside Ebbing, Missouri		
52nd National Society of Film Critics Awards	6 January 2018	Lady Bird	Greta Gerwig; Lady Bird	Daniel Kaluuya; Get Out	Sally Hawkins; The Shape of Water	Willem Dafoe; The Florida Project	Laurie Metcalf; Lady Bird	Greta Gerwig; Lady Bird		
75th Golden Globe Awards	7 January 2018	Three Billboards Outside Ebbing, Missouri (Drama); Lady Bird (Musical or Comedy)	Guillermo del Toro; The Shape of Water	Gary Oldman (Drama); Darkest Hour; James Franco (Musical or Comedy); The Disaster Artist	Frances McDormand (Drama); Three Billboards Outside Ebbing, Missouri; Saoirse Ronan (Musical or Comedy); Lady Bird	Sam Rockwell; Three Billboards Outside Ebbing, Missouri	Allison Janney; I, Tonya	Martin McDonagh; Three Billboards Outside Ebbing, Missouri		
23rd Critics' Choice Awards	11 January 2018	The Shape of Water	Guillermo del Toro; The Shape of Water	Gary Oldman; Darkest Hour	Frances McDormand; Three Billboards Outside Ebbing, Missouri	Sam Rockwell; Three Billboards Outside Ebbing, Missouri	Allison Janney; I, Tonya	Jordan Peele; Get Out	James Ivory; Call Me by Your Name	
29th Producers 24th Screen Actors 70th Directors 70th Writers Guild of America Awards	20–21 January, 3, 11 February 2018	The Shape of Water	Guillermo del Toro; The Shape of Water	Gary Oldman; Darkest Hour	Frances McDormand; Three Billboards Outside Ebbing, Missouri	Sam Rockwell; Three Billboards Outside Ebbing, Missouri	Allison Janney; I, Tonya	Jordan Peele; Get Out	James Ivory; Call Me by Your Name	
22nd Satellite Awards	11 February 2018	Three Billboards Outside Ebbing, Missouri (Major); God's Own Country (Independent)	Jordan Peele; Get Out	Gary Oldman (Major); Darkest Hour; Harry Dean Stanton (Independent); Lucky	Sally Hawkins (Major); The Shape of Water; Diane Kruger (Independent); In the Fade	Sam Rockwell; Three Billboards Outside Ebbing, Missouri	Lois Smith; Marjorie Prime	Martin McDonagh; Three Billboards Outside Ebbing, Missouri	Scott Neustadter and Michael H. Weber; The Disaster Artist	
71st British Academy Film Awards	18 February 2018	Three Billboards Outside Ebbing, Missouri	Guillermo del Toro; The Shape of Water	Gary Oldman; Darkest Hour	Frances McDormand; Three Billboards Outside Ebbing, Missouri	Sam Rockwell; Three Billboards Outside Ebbing, Missouri	Allison Janney; I, Tonya	Martin McDonagh; Three Billboards Outside Ebbing, Missouri	James Ivory; Call Me by Your Name	
33rd Independent Spirit Awards	3 March 2018	Get Out	Jordan Peele; Get Out	Timothée Chalamet; Call Me by Your Name	Frances McDormand; Three Billboards Outside Ebbing, Missouri	Sam Rockwell; Three Billboards Outside Ebbing, Missouri	Allison Janney; I, Tonya	Greta Gerwig; Lady Bird		
90th Academy Awards	4 March 2018	The Shape of Water	Guillermo del Toro; The Shape of Water	Gary Oldman; Darkest Hour	Frances McDormand; Three Billboards Outside Ebbing, Missouri	Sam Rockwell; Three Billboards Outside Ebbing, Missouri	Allison Janney; I, Tonya	Jordan Peele; Get Out	James Ivory; Call Me by Your Name	

=== Other Awards ===
Category	49th NAACP Image Awards 15 January 2018	18th Annual Black Reel Awards 23 February 2018
Best Picture	Girls Trip	Get Out
Best Director	Jordan Peele; Get Out	
Best Actor	Daniel Kaluuya; Get Out	
Best Actress	Octavia Spencer; Gifted	Natalie Paul; Crown Heights
Best Supporting Actor	Idris Elba; Thor: Ragnarok	Jason Mitchell; Mudbound
Best Supporting Actress	Tiffany Haddish; Girls Trip	
Best Screenplay	Jordan Peele; Get Out	
Ref.		

=== Critics Prizes ===
Award dates	Ceremony	Best Film winner	Ref.
30 November 2017	83rd New York Film Critics Circle Awards	Lady Bird	
3 December 2017	43rd Los Angeles Film Critics Association Awards	Call Me by Your Name	
7 December 2017	11th Detroit Film Critics Society Awards	The Florida Project	
8 December 2017	16th Washington D.C. Area Film Critics Association Awards	Get Out	
10 December 2017	17th New York Film Critics Online Awards	(tie) The Florida Project; Mudbound	
10 December 2017	21st Toronto Film Critics Association Awards	The Florida Project	
10 December 2017	38th Boston Society of Film Critics Awards	Phantom Thread	
10 December 2017	16th San Francisco Film Critics Circle Awards	The Florida Project	
11 December 2017	22nd San Diego Film Critics Society Awards	Get Out	
12 December 2017	30th Chicago Film Critics Association Awards	Lady Bird	
13 December 2017	23rd Dallas–Fort Worth Film Critics Association Awards	The Shape of Water	
17 December 2017	52nd Kansas City Film Critics Circle Awards	Get Out	
18 December 2017	21st Las Vegas Film Critics Awards	Three Billboards Outside Ebbing, Missouri	
18 December 2017	2nd Seattle Film Critics Society Awards	Get Out	
18 December 2017	18th Vancouver Film Critics Circle Awards	Lady Bird	
19 December 2017	26th Southeastern Film Critics Association Awards	Get Out	
19 December 2017	18th Phoenix Film Critics Society Awards	The Shape of Water	
19 December 2017	1st Los Angeles Online Film Critics Society Awards	The Shape of Water	
22 December 2017	7th Nevada Film Critics Society Awards	Three Billboards Outside Ebbing, Missouri	
23 December 2017	22nd Florida Film Critics Circle Awards	Dunkirk	
28 December 2017	21st Online Film Critics Society Awards	Get Out	
2 January 2018	12th Oklahoma Film Critics Circle Awards	Get Out	
6 January 2018	11th Houston Film Critics Society Awards	Lady Bird	
8 January 2018	13th Austin Film Critics Association Awards	Get Out	
28 January 2018	38th London Film Critics' Circle Awards	Three Billboards Outside Ebbing, Missouri	

== Films by awards gained ==
Major Awards and nominations received
Films	Academy Awards		BAFTA Awards		Golden Globe Awards		Guild Awards		Critics' Choice Awards		Satellite Awards		Total	
Films	Noms	Wins	Noms	Wins	Noms	Wins	Noms	Wins	Noms	Wins	Noms	Wins	Noms	Wins
All the Money in the World	1		1		3		1		—N/a	—N/a	—N/a	—N/a	6	0
Baby Driver	3		2	1	1		4	2	2	1	1		13	4
Battle of the Sexes	—N/a	—N/a	—N/a	—N/a	2		1		2		1		6	0
Beauty and the Beast	2		2		—N/a	—N/a	4		4		1		13	0
Blade Runner 2049	5	2	8	2	—N/a	—N/a	3	1	7	1	4	2	28	8
Call Me by Your Name	4	1	4	1	3		5	3	8	1	3		27	6
Coco	2	2	1	1	2	1	4	2	2	2	2	1	13	9
Darkest Hour	6	2	9	2	1	1	5	3	4	2	5	1	30	11
Dunkirk	8	3	8	1	3		6	1	8	1	11	1	44	7
Film Stars Don't Die in Liverpool	—N/a	—N/a	3		—N/a	—N/a	1		—N/a	—N/a	—N/a	—N/a	4	0
Get Out	4	1	2		2		8	2	5	2	4	1	25	6
I, Tonya	3	1	5	1	3	2	8	3	5	2	3		27	9
In the Fade	—N/a	—N/a	—N/a	—N/a	1	1	—N/a	—N/a	1	1	2	2	4	4
Lady Bird	5		3		4	2	10	1	8		6		36	3
Lady Macbeth	—N/a	—N/a	2		—N/a	—N/a	—N/a	—N/a	—N/a	—N/a	—N/a	—N/a	2	0
Molly's Game	1		1		2		2		2		2		10	0
Mudbound	4		—N/a	—N/a	2		5		4		4		14	0
Paddington 2	—N/a	—N/a	3		—N/a	—N/a	—N/a	—N/a	—N/a	—N/a	—N/a	—N/a	3	0
Phantom Thread	6	1	4	1	2		2		4	1	3	1	21	4
Star Wars: The Last Jedi	4		2		—N/a	—N/a	2		—N/a	—N/a	—N/a	—N/a	8	0
The Big Sick	1		—N/a	—N/a	—N/a	—N/a	6		6	1	2		15	1
The Death of Stalin	—N/a	—N/a	2		—N/a	—N/a	—N/a	—N/a	—N/a	—N/a	—N/a	—N/a	2	0
The Disaster Artist	1		—N/a	—N/a	2	1	2		4	1	2	1	11	3
The Greatest Showman	1		—N/a	—N/a	3		4		1		—N/a	—N/a	9	0
The Post	2		—N/a	—N/a	6		2		8		—N/a	—N/a	12	0
The Shape of Water	13	4	12	3	7	2	8	4	14	4	10	2	64	19
Three Billboards Outside Ebbing, Missouri	7	2	9	5	6	4	10	3	6	3	6	3	50	20
Victoria & Abdul	2		1		1		1		—N/a	—N/a	3		8	0
