= 2016–17 film awards season =

- Duration: 20 October 2016 – 26 February 2017

Film Awards seasons
- ← 2015–16 2017–18 →

The 2016–17 film awards season began in November 2016 with the Gotham Independent Film Awards 2016 and ended in February 2017 with the 89th Academy Awards. Major winners for the year included La La Land, Moonlight, Manchester by the Sea, among others.

== Award ceremonies ==
Award ceremony	Ceremony date	Best Film	Best Director	Best Actor	Best Actress	Best Supporting Actor	Best Supporting Actress	Best Original Screenplay	Best Adapted Screenplay	Ref.
26th Annual Gotham Independent Film Awards	28 November 2016	Moonlight	—N/a	Casey Affleck; Manchester by the Sea	Isabelle Huppert; Elle	—N/a		Barry Jenkins and Tarell Alvin McCraney; Moonlight		
88th National Board of Review Awards	29 November 2016	Manchester by the Sea	Barry Jenkins; Moonlight	Casey Affleck; Manchester by the Sea	Amy Adams; Arrival	Jeff Bridges; Hell or High Water	Naomie Harris; Moonlight	Kenneth Lonergan; Manchester by the Sea	Jay Cocks and Martin Scorsese; Silence	
22nd Critics' Choice Awards	11 December 2016	La La Land	Damien Chazelle; La La Land	Casey Affleck; Manchester by the Sea	Natalie Portman; Jackie	Mahershala Ali; Moonlight	Viola Davis; Fences	Damien Chazelle; La La Land; Kenneth Lonergan; Manchester by the Sea	Eric Heisserer; Arrival	
6th AACTA International Awards	6 January 2017	La La Land	Mel Gibson; Hacksaw Ridge	Casey Affleck; Manchester by the Sea	Emma Stone; La La Land	Dev Patel; Lion	Nicole Kidman; Lion	Kenneth Lonergan; Manchester by the Sea		
51st National Society of Film Critics Awards	7 January 2017	Moonlight	Barry Jenkins; Moonlight	Casey Affleck; Manchester by the Sea	Isabelle Huppert; Elle	Mahershala Ali; Moonlight	Michelle Williams; Manchester by the Sea	Kenneth Lonergan; Manchester by the Sea		
74th Golden Globe Awards	8 January 2017	Moonlight (Drama); La La Land (Musical/Comedy)	Damien Chazelle; La La Land	Casey Affleck (Drama); Manchester by the Sea; Ryan Gosling (Musical/Comedy); La La Land	Isabelle Huppert (Drama); Elle; Emma Stone (Musical/Comedy); La La Land	Aaron Taylor-Johnson; Nocturnal Animals	Viola Davis; Nocturnal Animals	Damien Chazelle; La La Land		
28th Producers 23rd Screen Actors 69th Directors Guild of America Awards	28–29 January, 4 February 2017	La La Land	Damien Chazelle; La La Land	Denzel Washington; Fences	Emma Stone; La La Land	Mahershala Ali; Moonlight	Viola Davis; Fences	—N/a		
70th British Academy Film Awards	12 February 2017	La La Land	Damien Chazelle; La La Land	Casey Affleck; Manchester by the Sea	Emma Stone; La La Land	Dev Patel; Lion	Viola Davis; Fences	Kenneth Lonergan; Manchester by the Sea	Luke Davies; Lion	
69th Writers Guild of America Awards	19 February 2017	—N/a						Barry Jenkins and Tarell Alvin McCraney; Moonlight	Eric Heisserer; Arrival	
21st Satellite Awards	19 February 2017	La La Land (Major); Manchester by the Sea (Independent)	Kenneth Lonergan; Manchester by the Sea	Andrew Garfield (Major); Hacksaw Ridge; Viggo Mortensen (Independent); Captain Fantastic	Ruth Negga (Major); Loving; Isabelle Huppert (Independent); Elle	Jeff Bridges; Hell or High Water	Naomie Harris; Moonlight	Barry Jenkins and Tarell Alvin McCraney; Moonlight	Oliver Stone and Kieran Fitzgerald; Snowden	
32nd Independent Spirit Awards	25 February 2017	Moonlight	Kenneth Lonergan; Manchester by the Sea	Casey Affleck; Manchester by the Sea	Isabelle Huppert; Elle	Ben Foster; Hell or High Water	Molly Shannon; Other People	Barry Jenkins and Tarell Alvin McCraney; Moonlight		
89th Academy Awards	26 February 2017	Moonlight	Damien Chazelle; La La Land	Casey Affleck; Manchester by the Sea	Emma Stone; La La Land	Mahershala Ali; Moonlight	Viola Davis; Fences	Kenneth Lonergan; Manchester by the Sea	Barry Jenkins and Tarell Alvin McCraney; Moonlight	

=== Critics Prizes ===
Award dates	Ceremony	Best Film winner	Ref.
1 December 2016	82nd New York Film Critics Circle Awards	La La Land	
4 December 2016	42nd Los Angeles Film Critics Association Awards	Moonlight	
22 January 2017	37th London Film Critics Circle Awards	La La Land	

== Films by awards gained ==
Major Awards and nominations received
Films	Academy Awards		BAFTA Awards		Golden Globe Awards		Guild Awards		Critics' Choice Awards		Satellite Awards		Total	
Films	Noms	Wins	Noms	Wins	Noms	Wins	Noms	Wins	Noms	Wins	Noms	Wins	Noms	Wins
20th Century Women	1		—N/a	—N/a	2		—N/a	—N/a	3		1		7	0
A Man Called Ove	2		—N/a	—N/a	—N/a	—N/a	—N/a	—N/a	—N/a	—N/a	1		3	0
Arrival	8	1	9	1	2		5	1	10	2	—N/a	—N/a	34	5
Captain Fantastic	1		1		1		4		1		4	1	12	1
Deadpool	—N/a	—N/a	—N/a	—N/a	2		5		4	2	1		12	2
Deepwater Horizon	2		1		—N/a	—N/a	—N/a	—N/a	—N/a	—N/a	—N/a	—N/a	3	0
Doctor Strange	1		3		—N/a	—N/a	4	1	6		2		16	1
Elle	1		1		2	2			2	1	2	1	8	4
Fantastic Beasts and Where to Find Them	2	1	5	1	—N/a	—N/a	5		4		—N/a	—N/a	16	2
Fences	4	1	1	1	2	1	6	2	6	1	4		23	6
Florence Foster Jenkins	2		4	1	4		2		3	1	2		17	2
Hacksaw Ridge	6	2	5	1	3		5	1	7	2	8	3	35	9
Hell or High Water	4		3		3		5		6		3	1	24	1
Hidden Figures	3		1		2		7	4	3		7	1	23	5
Kubo and the Two Strings	2		1	1	1		2		1		1		8	1
I, Daniel Blake	—N/a	—N/a	5	1	—N/a	—N/a	—N/a	—N/a	—N/a	—N/a	—N/a	—N/a	5	1
Jackie	3		3	1	1		4		6	3	5	1	22	5
The Jungle Book	1	1	1	1	—N/a	—N/a	—N/a	—N/a	1	1	7	2	10	5
La La Land	14	6	11	5	7	7	12	9	12	8	13	4	69	39
Lion	6		5	2	4		8	1	6		5		34	3
Loving	1		1		2		3		4		3	1	14	1
Manchester by the Sea	6	2	6	2	5	1	10		8	3	7	2	42	10
Moana	2		1		2		1		2		1		9	0
Moonlight	8	3	4		6	1	6	2	10	2	6	2	40	10
Nocturnal Animals	1		9		3	1	6	1	3		3		25	2
Passengers	2		—N/a	—N/a	—N/a	—N/a	—N/a	—N/a	—N/a	—N/a	—N/a	—N/a	2	0
Rogue One: A Star Wars Story	2		2		—N/a	—N/a	3	1	—N/a	—N/a	—N/a	—N/a	7	1
Sully	1		—N/a	—N/a	—N/a	—N/a	1		4		3		9	0
The Girl on the Train	—N/a	—N/a	1		—N/a	—N/a	3		—N/a	—N/a	—N/a	—N/a	4	0
The Lobster	1		1		1		—N/a	—N/a	1		1		5	0
