= 2022–23 film awards season =

Film awards for 2022

- Duration: 25 October 2022 – 12 March 2023

Film Awards seasons
- ← 2021–22 2023–24 →

The 2022–23 film awards season began in October 2022 with the 32nd Annual Gotham Awards and ended in March 2023 with the 95th Academy Awards.

== Award ceremonies ==
Award ceremony	Ceremony date	Best Picture	Best Director	Best Actor	Best Actress	Best Supporting Actor	Best Supporting Actress	Best Original Screenplay	Best Adapted Screenplay	Ref.
32nd Annual Gotham Awards	28 November 2022	Everything Everywhere All at Once	—N/a	Danielle Deadwyler; Till		Ke Huy Quan; Everything Everywhere All at Once		Todd Field; Tár		
93rd National Board of Review Awards	8 December 2022	Top Gun: Maverick	Steven Spielberg; The Fabelmans	Colin Farrell; The Banshees of Inisherin	Michelle Yeoh; Everything Everywhere All at Once	Brendan Gleeson; The Banshees of Inisherin	Janelle Monáe; Glass Onion: A Knives Out Mystery	Martin McDonagh; The Banshees of Inisherin	Edward Berger, Lesley Paterson and Ian Stokell; All Quiet on the Western Front	
57th National Society of Film Critics Awards	7 January 2023	Tár	Charlotte Wells; Aftersun	Colin Farrell; The Banshees of Inisherin	Cate Blanchett; Tár	Ke Huy Quan; Everything Everywhere All at Once	Kerry Condon; The Banshees of Inisherin	Todd Field; Tár		
80th Golden Globe Awards	10 January 2023	The Fabelmans (Drama); The Banshees of Inisherin (Musical or Comedy)	Steven Spielberg; The Fabelmans	Austin Butler (Drama); Elvis; Colin Farrell (Musical or Comedy); The Banshees of Inisherin	Cate Blanchett (Drama); Tár; Michelle Yeoh (Musical or Comedy); Everything Everywhere All at Once	Ke Huy Quan; Everything Everywhere All at Once	Angela Bassett; Black Panther: Wakanda Forever	Martin McDonagh; The Banshees of Inisherin		
28th Critics' Choice Awards	15 January 2023	Everything Everywhere All at Once	Daniel Kwan and Daniel Scheinert; Everything Everywhere All at Once	Brendan Fraser; The Whale	Cate Blanchett; Tár	Ke Huy Quan; Everything Everywhere All at Once	Angela Bassett; Black Panther: Wakanda Forever	Daniel Kwan and Daniel Scheinert; Everything Everywhere All at Once	Sarah Polley; Women Talking	
75th Directors Guild of America Awards	18 February 2023	—N/a	Daniel Kwan and Daniel Scheinert; Everything Everywhere All at Once	—N/a						
76th British Academy Film Awards	19 February 2023	All Quiet on the Western Front	Edward Berger; All Quiet on the Western Front	Austin Butler; Elvis	Cate Blanchett; Tár	Barry Keoghan; The Banshees of Inisherin	Kerry Condon; The Banshees of Inisherin	Martin McDonagh; The Banshees of Inisherin	Edward Berger, Lesley Paterson and Ian Stokell; All Quiet on the Western Front	
12th AACTA International Awards	24 February 2023	Avatar: The Way of Water	Baz Luhrmann; Elvis	Austin Butler; Elvis	Cate Blanchett; Tár	Brendan Gleeson; The Banshees of Inisherin	Kerry Condon; The Banshees of Inisherin	Martin McDonagh; The Banshees of Inisherin		
34th Producers Guild of America Awards 29th Screen Actors Guild Awards	25–26 February 2023	Everything Everywhere All at Once	—N/a	Brendan Fraser; The Whale	Michelle Yeoh; Everything Everywhere All at Once	Ke Huy Quan; Everything Everywhere All at Once	Jamie Lee Curtis; Everything Everywhere All at Once	—N/a		
27th Satellite Awards	3 March 2023	Top Gun: Maverick (Drama); Everything Everywhere All at Once (Musical or Comedy)	James Cameron; Avatar: The Way of Water	Brendan Fraser (Drama); The Whale; Austin Butler (Musical or Comedy); Elvis	Danielle Deadwyler (Drama); Till; Michelle Yeoh (Musical or Comedy); Everything Everywhere All at Once	Ke Huy Quan; Everything Everywhere All at Once	Claire Foy; Women Talking	Martin McDonagh; The Banshees of Inisherin	Sarah Polley; Women Talking	
38th Independent Spirit Awards	4 March 2023	Everything Everywhere All at Once	Daniel Kwan and Daniel Scheinert; Everything Everywhere All at Once	Michelle Yeoh; Everything Everywhere All at Once		Ke Huy Quan; Everything Everywhere All at Once		Daniel Kwan and Daniel Scheinert; Everything Everywhere All at Once		
75th Writers Guild of America Awards	5 March 2023	—N/a						Daniel Kwan and Daniel Scheinert; Everything Everywhere All at Once	Sarah Polley; Women Talking	
95th Academy Awards	12 March 2023	Everything Everywhere All at Once	Daniel Kwan and Daniel Scheinert; Everything Everywhere All at Once	Brendan Fraser; The Whale	Michelle Yeoh; Everything Everywhere All at Once	Ke Huy Quan; Everything Everywhere All at Once	Jamie Lee Curtis; Everything Everywhere All at Once	Daniel Kwan and Daniel Scheinert; Everything Everywhere All at Once	Sarah Polley; Women Talking	

=== Technical Guild awards ===
Award ceremony	Ceremony date	Main categories winner(s)	Ref.
37th American Society of Cinematographers Awards	5 March 2023	Outstanding Achievement in Cinematography: Mandy Walker – Elvis	

=== Critics awards ===
Award dates	Ceremony	Best Film winner	Ref.
2 December 2022	88th New York Film Critics Circle Awards	Tár	
11 December 2022	48th Los Angeles Film Critics Association Awards	Everything Everywhere All at Once; Tár	
5 February 2023	43rd London Film Critics' Circle Awards	Tár	
