= List of Sebastian Stan performances =

Stan at the 2024 Berlin International Film Festival

Sebastian Stan is a Romanian and American actor. He appeared briefly in Michael Haneke's 71 Fragments of a Chronology of Chance (1994) as a child, before taking on minor roles in the early 2000s, considering The Architect (2006) to be his major debut. This was followed by roles in Renny Harlin's The Covenant (2006), Fred Durst's The Education of Charlie Banks (2007), Jonathan Demme's Rachel Getting Married (2008), David Mackenzie's Spread (2009), and the television series Gossip Girl (2007–2010) and Kings (2009), as well as his Broadway debut in Eric Bogosian's play Talk Radio (2007). Despite performing in Darren Aronofsky's blockbuster Black Swan (2010), he struggled financially and survived on residuals from Steve Pink's Hot Tub Time Machine (2010).

In 2010, Stan was cast in his most prolific role as Bucky Barnes / Winter Soldier in the Marvel Cinematic Universe (MCU). He began portraying the character in Captain America: The First Avenger (2011), and has since appeared in nine films, two television series, and one video game within the franchise. Notable entries include Captain America: The Winter Soldier (2014), Captain America: Civil War (2016), Avengers: Infinity War (2018), Avengers: Endgame (2019), The Falcon and the Winter Soldier (2021), What If...? (2021–2024), Thunderbolts* (2025), and the upcoming Avengers: Doomsday (2026); of these, Avengers: Infinity War and Avengers: Endgame rank among the highest-grossing films of all time. He is also slated to join the Batman film franchise as Harvey Dent in The Batman: Part II (2028).

Stan began increasing his workload in the 2010s, notably appearing in television series such as Once Upon a Time (2012) and Political Animals (2012), and films such as Demme's Ricki and the Flash (2015), Ridley Scott's The Martian (2015), Steven Soderbergh's Logan Lucky (2017), Craig Gillespie's I, Tonya (2017), and Mimi Cave's Fresh (2022). He began to find wider critical success in the 2020s, receiving Emmy and Golden Globe nominations for portraying musician Tommy Lee in the miniseries Pam & Tommy (2022). He won the Golden Globe for Best Actor for playing a disfigured actor with neurofibromatosis in Aaron Schimberg's A Different Man (2024), and was nominated for the Academy Award and BAFTA Award for Best Actor for playing Donald Trump in Ali Abbasi's The Apprentice (2024). Further acclaim came for portraying a conservative father in Cristian Mungiu's Fjord (2026).

== Film ==
Stan at the 2013 San Diego Comic-Con

Key
†	Denotes films that have not yet been released

List of Sebastian Stan film credits
Year	Title	Role	Notes	Ref.
1994	71 Fragments of a Chronology of Chance	Kid in Subway	Cameo	
2004	Tony n' Tina's Wedding	Johnny Nunzio		
2005	Red Doors	Simon		
2006	The Architect	Martin Waters		
2006	The Covenant	Chase Collins		
2007	The Education of Charlie Banks	Leo Reilly		
2008	Rachel Getting Married	Walter		
2009	Spread	Harry		
2010	Hot Tub Time Machine	Blaine		
2010	Black Swan	Andrew / Suitor		
2011	Captain America: The First Avenger	James Buchanan "Bucky" Barnes		
2012	Gone	Billy		
2012	The Apparition	Ben Curtis		
2014	Captain America: The Winter Soldier	Bucky Barnes / Winter Soldier		
2015	Ant-Man	Bucky Barnes / Winter Soldier	Uncredited cameo; post-credits scene	
2015	The Bronze	Lance Tucker		
2015	Ricki and the Flash	Joshua Brummel		
2015	The Martian	Chris Beck		
2016	Captain America: Civil War	Bucky Barnes / Winter Soldier		
2017	Logan Lucky	Dayton White		
2017	I, Tonya	Jeff Gillooly		
2017	I'm Not Here	Young Steve		
2018	Destroyer	Chris		
2018	We Have Always Lived in the Castle	Charles Blackwood		
2018	Black Panther	Bucky Barnes / Winter Soldier / White Wolf	Uncredited cameo; post-credits scene	
2018	Avengers: Infinity War	Bucky Barnes / Winter Soldier / White Wolf		
2019	Avengers: Endgame	Bucky Barnes / Winter Soldier / White Wolf		
2019	Endings, Beginnings	Frank		
2019	The Last Full Measure	Scott Huffman		
2020	The Devil All the Time	Lee Bodecker		
2020	Monday	Mickey		
2022	The 355	Nick Fowler		
2022	Fresh	Steve / Brendan		
2023	Sharper	Max		
2023	Ghosted	God	Cameo	
2023	Dumb Money	Vlad Tenev		
2024	A Different Man	Edward Lemuel / Guy Moratz	Also executive producer	
2024	The Apprentice	Donald Trump		
2025	Captain America: Brave New World	Bucky Barnes / Winter Soldier	Uncredited cameo	
2025	Thunderbolts*	Bucky Barnes / Winter Soldier		
2026	Fjord	Mihai Gheorghiu		
2026	A River's Gaze	—N/a	Producer; originally titled Malul vânăt	
2026	Avengers: Doomsday †	Bucky Barnes / Winter Soldier	Post-production	
2028	The Batman: Part II †	Harvey Dent	Filming	

== Television ==
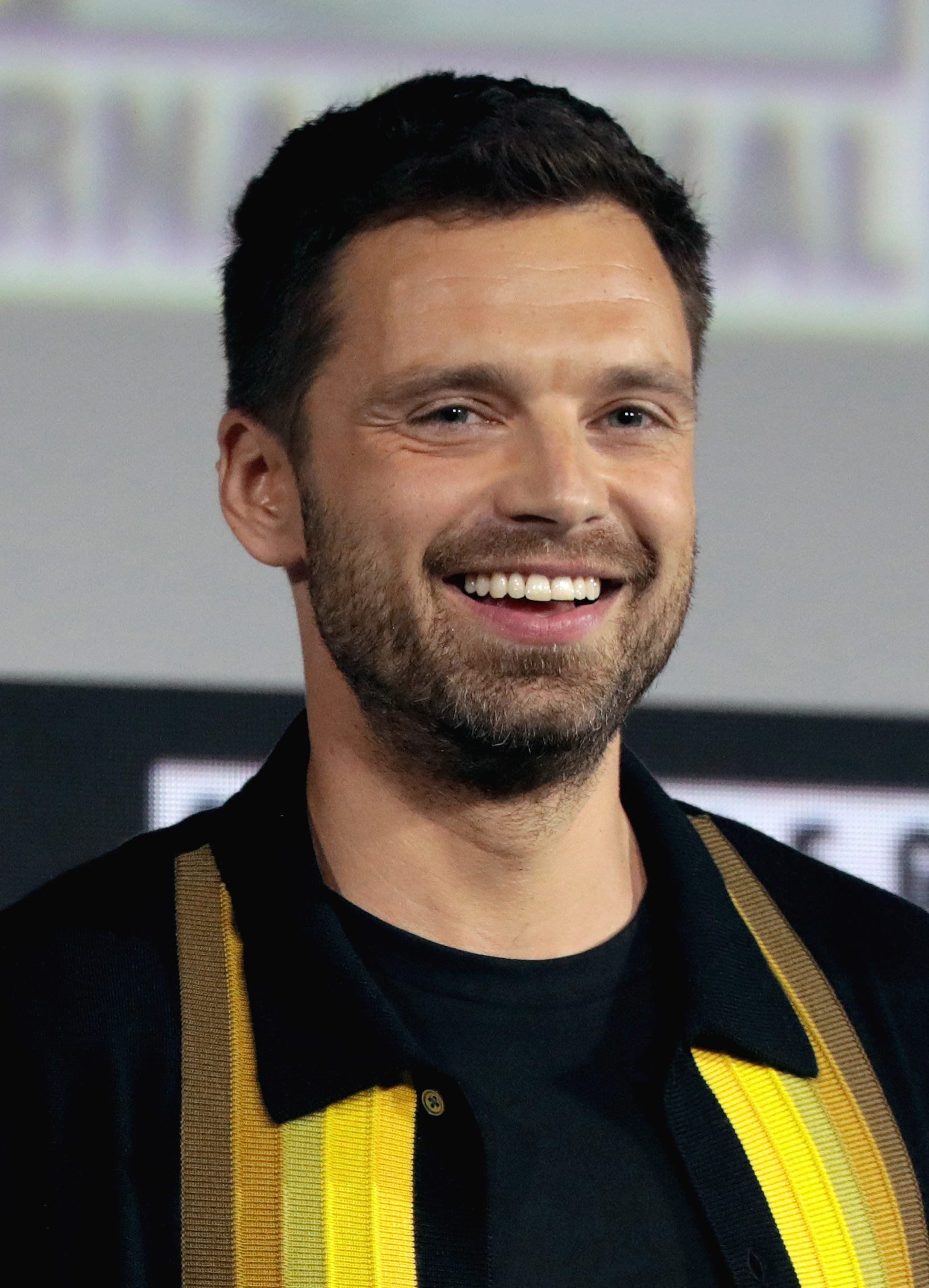
Stan at the 2019 San Diego Comic-Con

List of Sebastian Stan television credits
Year	Title	Role	Notes	Ref.
2003	Law & Order	Justin Capshaw	Episode: "Sheltered"	
2007–2010	Gossip Girl	Carter Baizen	11 episodes	
2009	Kings	Jonathan "Jack" Benjamin	13 episodes	
2012	Once Upon a Time	Jefferson / Mad Hatter	6 episodes	
2012	Political Animals	Thomas James "T.J." Hammond	Miniseries; 6 episodes	
2012	Labyrinth	Will Franklyn	Miniseries; 2 episodes	
2017	I'm Dying Up Here	Calogero "Clay" Apuzzo	Episode: "Pilot"	
2021	The Falcon and the Winter Soldier	Bucky Barnes / Winter Soldier / White Wolf	Miniseries; 6 episodes	
2021	Marvel Studios: Assembled	Himself	Episode: "The Making of The Falcon and the Winter Soldier"	
2021–2024	What If...?	Bucky Barnes / Winter Soldier	Voice role; 7 episodes	
2022	Pam & Tommy	Tommy Lee	Miniseries; 8 episodes	
2023	Bupkis	Himself	Episode: "ISO"	

== Stage ==
List of Sebastian Stan stage credits
Year	Title	Role	Venue	Ref.
2007	Talk Radio	Kent	Longacre Theatre, Broadway	
2013	Picnic	Hal Carter	American Airlines Theatre, Broadway	

== Video games ==
List of Sebastian Stan video game credits
Year	Title	Role	Notes	Ref.
2011	Captain America: Super Soldier	Bucky Barnes	Voice role	

== Music videos ==
List of Sebastian Stan music video credits
Year	Title	Artist	Ref.
2008	"Wake Up Call"	Hayden Panettiere	

== Soundtrack discography ==
List of Sebastian Stan soundtrack credits
Year	Title	Soundtrack	Ref.
2022	"Get Outta My Face"	Pam & Tommy	
2022	"She Says Yeah Yeah"	Pam & Tommy	

== See also ==
- List of awards and nominations received by Sebastian Stan
