= List of awards and nominations received by Sebastian Stan =

Sebastian Stan awards and nominations
- Stan at the 2024 Berlin International Film Festival, where he won the Silver Bear for Best Leading Performance
Awards and nominations
Award	Wins	Nominations
Academy Awards	0	1
BAFTA Awards	0	1
Critics' Choice Awards	0	2
Emmy Awards	0	1
Golden Globe Awards	1	3

Totals (Note: Certain award groups do not simply award one winner. They acknowledge several different recipients, have runners-up, and have third place. Since this is a specific recognition and is different from losing an award, runner-up mentions are considered wins in this award tally. For simplification and to avoid errors, each award in this list has been presumed to have had a prior nomination.)
- Wins: 9
- Nominations: 32

Sebastian Stan is a Romanian and American actor who has received numerous accolades, including a Golden Globe Award, as well as nominations for an Academy Award, a British Academy Film Award, two Critics' Choice Awards, and a Primetime Emmy Award. Overall, he has received 9 awards from 32 nominations.

After gaining early recognition in the 2000s, in 2010, Stan was cast in his most prolific role as Bucky Barnes / Winter Soldier in the Marvel Cinematic Universe (MCU). He began portraying the character in Captain America: The First Avenger (2011), and has since appeared in several entries for the franchise. For his work, he won a shared MTV Movie & TV Award and nominations for another MTV Movie Award, two Nickelodeon Kids' Choice Awards, and a Teen Choice Award.

For his performance as the gay son of a former first lady in the comedy drama miniseries Political Animals (2012), Stan received his first major nomination for the Critics' Choice Award for Best Supporting Actor in a Miniseries. He began to find wider critical success in the 2020s, beginning with his portrayal of Tommy Lee in the biographical drama miniseries Pam & Tommy (2022), earning nominations for the Critics' Choice Award, Golden Globe Award, and Primetime Emmy Award for Best Actor in a Miniseries.

Stan received praise for portraying a struggling actor with neurofibromatosis in the psychological thriller film A Different Man (2024), winning the Golden Globe Award for Best Actor – Musical or Comedy and Silver Bear for Best Leading Performance. For playing Donald Trump in the biographical drama film The Apprentice (2024), he was nominated for the Academy Award, BAFTA Award, and Golden Globe Award – Drama for Best Actor. Further acclaim came for portraying a conservative father in the legal drama film Fjord (2026).

== Awards and nominations ==
Awards and nominations received by Sebastian Stan
Award	Year (Note: Indicates the year of ceremony. Each year is linked to the article about the awards held that year, wherever possible.)	Category	Nominated work	Result	Ref.
Academy Awards	2025	Best Actor	The Apprentice	Nominated	
Alliance of Women Film Journalists	2024	Best Actor	The Apprentice	Nominated	
Astra Midseason Film Awards	2022	Best Actor	Fresh	Nominated	
Astra TV Awards	2022	Best Actor in an Anthology or Limited Series or Movie	Fresh	Nominated	
Astra TV Awards	2022	Best Actor in an Anthology or Limited Series or Movie	Pam & Tommy	Nominated	
Berlin International Film Festival Awards	2024	Silver Bear for Best Leading Performance	A Different Man	Won	
British Academy Film Awards	2025	Best Actor in a Leading Role	The Apprentice	Nominated	
Canadian Screen Awards	2025	Best Lead Performance in a Drama Film	The Apprentice	Won	
Critics' Choice Television Awards	2013	Best Supporting Actor in a Limited Series or Movie Made for Television	Political Animals	Nominated	
Critics' Choice Television Awards	2023	Best Actor in a Limited Series or Movie Made for Television	Pam & Tommy	Nominated	
Deauville American Film Festival Awards	2024	Hollywood Rising Star Award	—N/a	Honored	
Dublin Film Critics' Circle Awards	2024	Best Actor	A Different Man	Nominated	
European Film Awards	2027	Best European Actor	Fjord	Pending	
Florida Film Critics Circle Awards	2017	Best Ensemble (shared with the cast of I, Tonya)	I, Tonya	Nominated	
Golden Globe Awards	2023	Best Actor – Miniseries or Television Film	Pam & Tommy	Nominated	
Golden Globe Awards	2025	Best Actor in a Motion Picture – Musical or Comedy	A Different Man	Won	
Golden Globe Awards	2025	Best Actor in a Motion Picture – Drama	The Apprentice	Nominated	
Hellenic Film Academy Awards	2022	Best Actor	Monday	Nominated	
Hollywood Film Awards	2017	Ensemble of the Year (shared with the cast of I, Tonya)	I, Tonya	Won	
Independent Spirit Awards	2025	Best Lead Performance	The Apprentice	Nominated	
Irish Film and Television Awards	2025	Best International Actor	The Apprentice	Nominated	
Miami Film Festival Awards	2024	Precious Gem Award	—N/a	Honored	
MTV Movie & TV Awards	2015	Best Fight (shared with Chris Evans)	Captain America: The Winter Soldier	Nominated	
MTV Movie & TV Awards	2021	Best Duo (shared with Anthony Mackie)	The Falcon and the Winter Soldier	Won	
New York Film Critics Online Awards	2024	Best Actor	A Different Man	Nominated	
Nickelodeon Kids' Choice Awards	2017	#SQUAD (shared with Chris Evans, Robert Downey Jr., Scarlett Johansson, Anthony Mackie, Don Cheadle, Jeremy Renner, and Chadwick Boseman)	Captain America: Civil War	Nominated	
Nickelodeon Kids' Choice Awards	2025	Favorite Butt-Kicker	Thunderbolts*	Nominated	
Online Film Critics Society Awards	2024	Best Actor	A Different Man	Nominated	
Primetime Emmy Awards	2022	Outstanding Lead Actor in a Limited Series or Movie	Pam & Tommy	Nominated	
Santa Barbara International Film Festival Awards	2025	Virtuosos Award	—N/a	Honored	
Savannah Film Festival Awards	2024	Maverick Award	—N/a	Honored	
Teen Choice Awards	2016	Choice Movie: Chemistry (shared with Chris Evans, Anthony Mackie, Elizabeth Olsen, and Jeremy Renner)	Captain America: Civil War	Nominated	

== See also ==
- List of Sebastian Stan performances
- List of Romanian Academy Award winners and nominees
