= Sebastian Stan =

Romanian and American actor (born 1982)

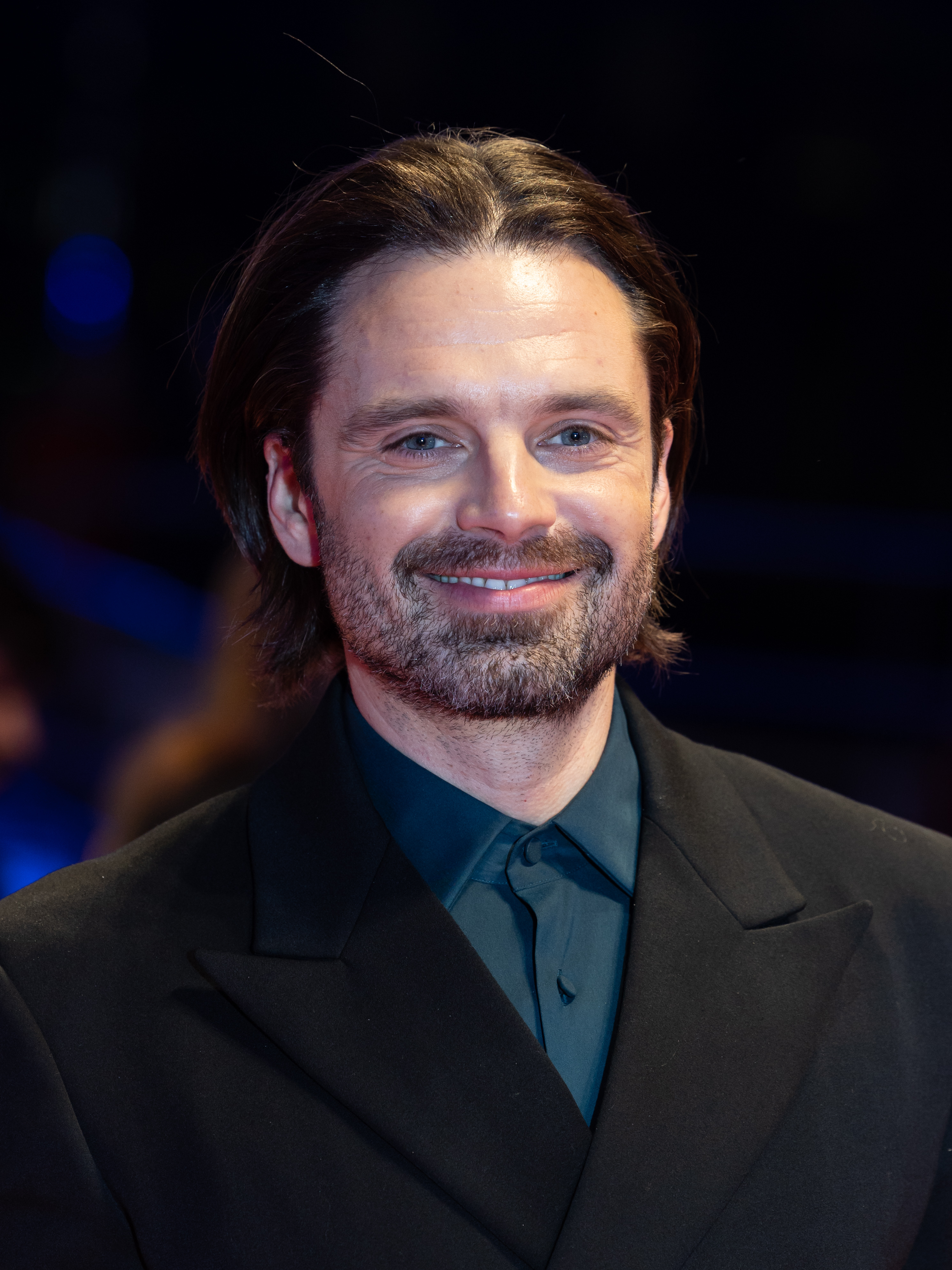
- Stan in 2024
- Born: August 13, 1982 (age 44); Constanța, Romania
- Citizenship: Romania; United States (since 2002)
- Education: Rutgers University (BFA)
- Occupation: Actor
- Years active: 1994–present
- Works: Full list
- Partner: Annabelle Wallis (2022–present)
- Children: 1
- Awards: Full list

Sebastian Stan (born August 13, 1982) is a Romanian and American actor. His films, which include blockbusters and independent features, have grossed over $7 billion worldwide. His accolades include a Golden Globe Award and nominations for an Academy Award, a British Academy Film Award, and a Primetime Emmy Award.

Born in Constanța, Stan relocated to Vienna at age eight following the Romanian Revolution, before immigrating to the United States at twelve and becoming an American citizen in 2002. He studied theater at Rutgers University and Shakespeare's Globe, receiving a Bachelor of Fine Arts in acting. After a series of minor roles, he made his professional film debut in The Architect (2006), and gained early recognition for appearing in the series Gossip Girl (2007–2010) as Carter Baizen and Kings (2009). He also had leading roles in Broadway revivals of Talk Radio (2007) and Picnic (2013), and supporting roles in the films Hot Tub Time Machine (2010) and Black Swan (2010). However, he struggled to support himself financially during this period.

Stan achieved global stardom for portraying Bucky Barnes / Winter Soldier in the Marvel Cinematic Universe (MCU), beginning with Captain America: The First Avenger (2011) and including his headlining miniseries The Falcon and the Winter Soldier (2021). After experiencing continued success with The Martian (2015) and I, Tonya (2017), his portrayal of musician Tommy Lee in the miniseries Pam & Tommy (2022) earned him nominations for the Golden Globe and Primetime Emmy for Best Actor. He gave acclaimed performances in 2024 as an actor with neurofibromatosis in A Different Man, winning the Golden Globe for Best Actor, and as Donald Trump in The Apprentice, earning nominations for the Academy Award and BAFTA Award for Best Actor. Further acclaim came for portraying a conservative father in Fjord (2026).

Stan is an advocate for broader equality and supports several charitable causes. He has been open about his lifestyle and personal struggles, including his experiences with body dysmorphia and obsessive–compulsive disorder. He has been in a relationship with actress Annabelle Wallis since 2022 and they have one child.

== Early life ==
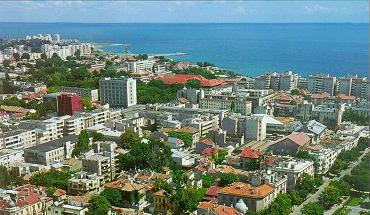
The city of Constanța, Romania, where Stan was born

Sebastian Stan was born August 13, 1982, in Constanța to Constantin Stan, a dockworker, and Georgeta Orlovschi, a pianist. His parents divorced when he was two years old, and he lost touch with his biological father until he was 18. Following the Romanian Revolution of 1989, eight-year-old Stan and his mother relocated to Vienna. At age twelve, they immigrated to the United States, settling in Rockland County, New York, after his mother married Anthony Fruhauf, a private school headmaster. He described the move as traumatizing, but something that "did feed me resilience, because it did allow me to get better at restarting and restarting, it fed a lot of who I am."

Stan attended Rockland Country Day School, where he began acting at his mother's encouragement and starred in school productions such as Cyrano de Bergerac. His first film credit came as a child, making a brief appearance in Michael Haneke's 1994 drama film 71 Fragments of a Chronology of Chance. He disliked the experience and considered quitting due to the long shooting schedule, but scarcely remembers it as an adult. He attended the Stagedoor Manor performing arts camp, which he credited with giving him the confidence to pursue acting seriously. At Stagedoor, he performed in musicals like Grease, Sweet Charity and On the Twentieth Century. After becoming an American citizen in 2002, he enrolled at Rutgers University's Mason Gross School of the Arts. As part of his curriculum, he studied abroad at Shakespeare's Globe in London, England. He graduated from Rutgers in 2005 with a Bachelor of Fine Arts in acting.

== Career ==
=== 2003–2010: Early work ===
Focusing on his education, Stan did not begin professionally acting until 2003, with a guest spot as an accused teenage killer in the Law & Order episode "Sheltered". This followed with minor roles in the films Tony n' Tina's Wedding (2004) and Red Doors (2005). He considers the 2006 drama film The Architect, in which he plays a teen exploring his sexuality, to be his first major film. He next starred in Renny Harlin's dark fantasy horror film The Covenant (2006) as a high schooler who becomes a warlock. To prepare for the role, he was told by a producer to "look like John Travolta in Staying Alive", which sparked his enduring interest in fitness. The film achieved modest sales and a cult following.

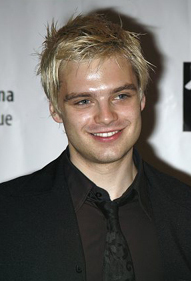
Stan at the 2007 Drama League Awards

In 2007, Stan made his Broadway debut as Kent in a production of Eric Bogosian's play Talk Radio. Writing for The New York Times, Ben Brantley called Stan's performance "compellingly hyper". The same year, he appeared in Fred Durst's drama The Education of Charlie Banks. From 2007 to 2010, he played a recurring role as villain Carter Baizen in the teen drama series Gossip Girl, which he called "the best of times" and garnered him early attention. In 2008, he performed in the music video for "Wake Up Call", the debut single of The Architect co-star Hayden Panettiere, and appeared in the opening scene of Jonathan Demme's drama film Rachel Getting Married, which Seongyong Cho of RogerEbert.com found amusing. The next year, he appeared in David Mackenzie's sex comedy film Spread.

Stan had his first starring television role in the drama series Kings (2009), portraying a prince and heir to a throne who is secretly gay. Although it was cancelled after one season, Daniel Fienberg of The Hollywood Reporter retrospectively declared that Stan "should have been an immediate star out of this project." He auditioned for the roles of Stefan and Damon Salvatore in the supernatural series The Vampire Diaries that same year; although considered for Stefan, he backed out because of his commitment to Kings. He secured his first commercial success in 2010 with a supporting role as a suitor in Darren Aronofsky's psychological horror film Black Swan, which grossed $332 million worldwide. The experience broadened his approach to acting, though he continued to struggle with work and credits his role as a bully in Hot Tub Time Machine (2010) for keeping him financially stable through residual checks.

=== 2011–2017: Breakthrough and rise to prominence ===
For his first comic book role, Stan appeared in the Marvel Cinematic Universe (MCU) film Captain America: The First Avenger. Stan initially auditioned for the titular character and "really impressed" casting director Sarah Halley Finn, but noticed a melancholic edge she felt better fit the role of James Buchanan "Bucky" Barnes, the sidekick and childhood best friend of Captain America. While actor Chris Evans was cast as Captain America, producer and studio executive Kevin Feige thought Stan would be a "good Bucky" and a "great Winter Soldier", contracting him for multiple films in the MCU. To prepare for the role, he watched Band of Brothers and various documentaries about World War II. It premiered in July 2011 and grossed a worldwide total of $370 million, though Stan continued to struggle with rent even after its success.

Stan at the 2013 San Diego Comic-Con

In 2012, Stan appeared in the thriller film Gone and the supernatural horror film The Apparition, which he later recognized was "not a great horror film." That same year, he starred in the drama miniseries Political Animals, which is about families in the White House, and the historical miniseries Labyrinth, inspired by the 2005 novel of the same name. For playing the gay son of an ex-first lady in the former, he was deemed "deeply affecting" by Matt Zoller Seitz of Vulture and nominated for the Critics' Choice Television Award for Best Supporting Actor in a Movie/Miniseries. Also in 2012, he played the Mad Hatter in the fantasy series Once Upon a Time, appearing in six episodes, including "Hat Trick". He returned to the stage in 2013, playing the lead role of a hobo in the Roundabout Theater Company's production of William Inge's play Picnic. He earned modest praise for his acting from Marilyn Stasio of Variety.

Stan's next entry in the MCU, Captain America: The Winter Soldier, was his first as the Winter Soldier, a mysterious assassin later revealed to be a brainwashed Bucky Barnes. Though his contract was expanded to nine films, Stan did not think he would return to the role so soon and only learned of the sequel's title through a friend. He prepared for the role with five months of physical training, researching the Cold War and the KGB, and learning daily knife tricks so he would not need a stuntman. Because the character's transformation resulted in very little spoken dialogue, Stan focused heavily on acting through his eyes and body language, drawing from his experience in theatre. Released in March 2014, the film outperformed its predecessor commercially, grossing $714 million. Entertainment Weekly's Owen Gleiberman felt Stan captured the character's "chilling transformation", and The Hollywood Reporter's Todd McCarthy wrote that he "proves a well-matched, and equally good-looking, antagonist for his old friend." He and Chris Evans received a shared nomination for the MTV Movie Award for Best Fight.

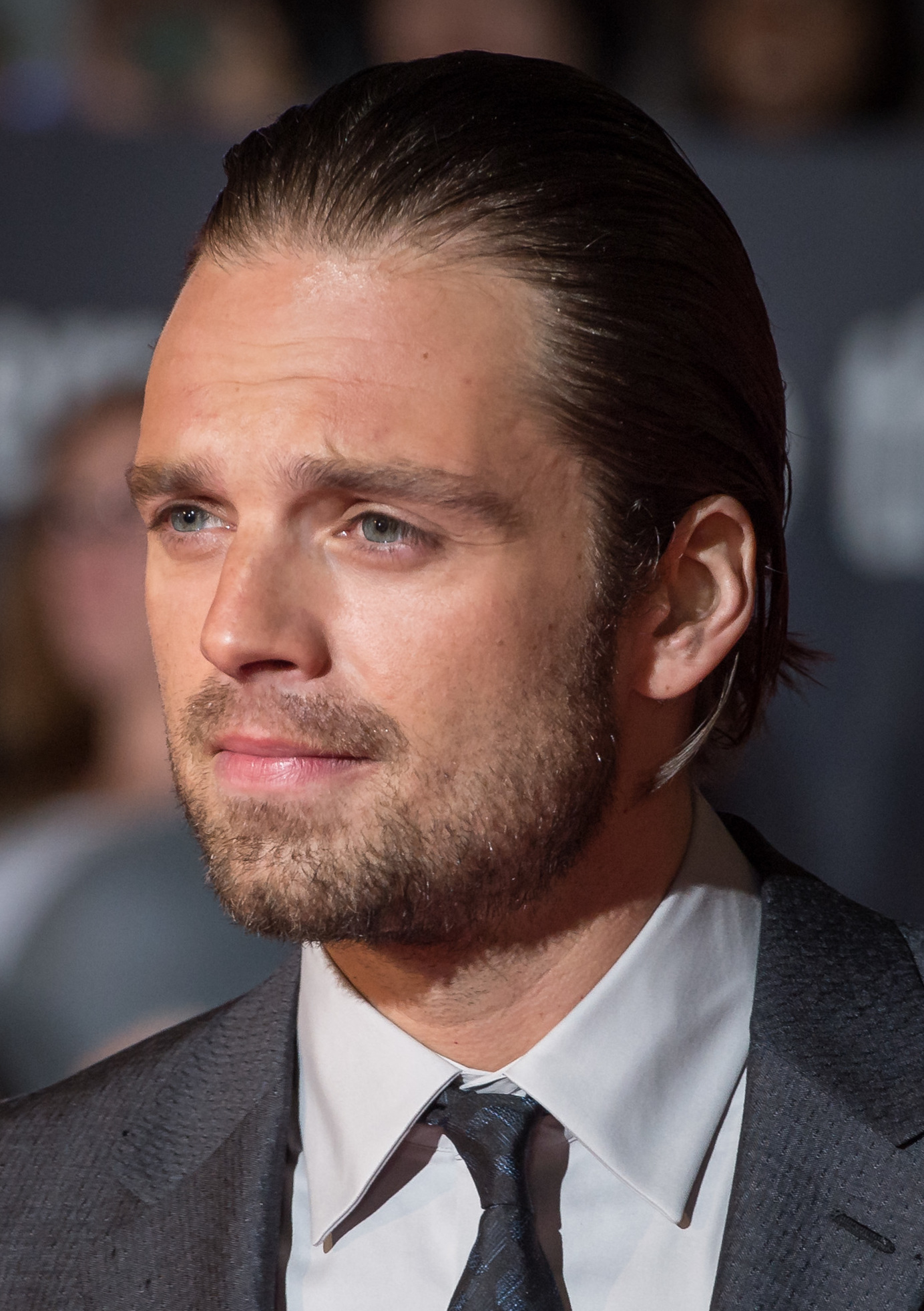
Stan at the premiere of The Martian in 2015

After an uncredited cameo as Barnes in the MCU film Ant-Man, Stan took on two comedic roles in 2015. The first was Bryan Buckley's The Bronze, which featured his first on-screen nude scene that he was "maybe too enthusiastic" about filming. The second was another film for Jonathan Demme, Ricki and the Flash, which is about a woman who leaves her family to become a rock star. He followed these playing a NASA scientist in Ridley Scott's The Martian, a science fiction feature about an astronaut's battle for survival after being stranded on Mars. He called Scott "one of the greatest filmmakers" and enjoyed the unique filming experience. It was his first film with actress Jessica Chastain, with whom he is close friends. The Martian became the tenth highest-grossing film of 2015 and Stan's highest-grossing non-MCU film, with sales of $630 million worldwide.

Stan next starred in the MCU film Captain America: Civil War, reprising the role of Barnes who is framed for terrorism amidst a split of the Avengers. According to co-star Anthony Mackie and director Joe Russo, Stan had the "most difficult" and "complicated" role of the film. He intended to portray his character as an amalgam of Barnes and the Winter Soldier, saying that "he's never really going to be Bucky Barnes again. There's going to be recognizable things about him, but his path through the Winter Soldier is always going to be there, haunting him." Because of this, he had significantly more dialogue compared to Captain America: The Winter Soldier. The film debuted in April 2016 and became Stan's first to exceed $1 billion at the box-office. Critics at The Hollywood Reporter and RogerEbert.com particularly praised the emotional depth of Stan's acting and his chemistry with Evans. He earned shared nominations with select cast members at the Teen Choice and Kids' Choice Awards.

Stan began 2017 with a supporting role in Steven Soderbergh's caper comedy film Logan Lucky, playing a disgruntled yet prideful NASCAR driver. He next starred in Craig Gillespie's I, Tonya, a biographical sports drama about the life of American figure skater Tonya Harding and the 1994 assault of Nancy Kerrigan, as Jeff Gilooly, Harding's husband. He prepared for the role by repeatedly listening to The Tonya Tapes and meeting with Gilooly two weeks before production, which he called "bizarre". The film was released in September 2017 to financial success, and Rex Reed of The New York Observer called his performance "career-changing". His last work of 2017 was the independent drama film I'm Not Here.

=== 2018–2023: Blockbusters and streaming projects ===
In 2018, Stan appeared in Karyn Kusama's independent crime drama film Destroyer alongside Nicole Kidman. The film follows a former police officer (Kidman) who enacts revenge against members of a gang who compromised her undercover operation. Stan portrays Chris, her former partner and lover from the assignment, who was killed prior to the events of the film. He next starred as Charles Blackwood in the fantasy thriller We Have Always Lived in the Castle, a film adaptation of Shirley Jackson's novel of the same name. He reprised the role of Barnes in the MCU film Avengers: Infinity War, following an uncredited cameo in Black Panther (2018). After overcoming his trauma as the Winter Soldier with help from the people of Wakanda, his character is given the nickname White Wolf. The film grossed $2 billion and set several box-office records.

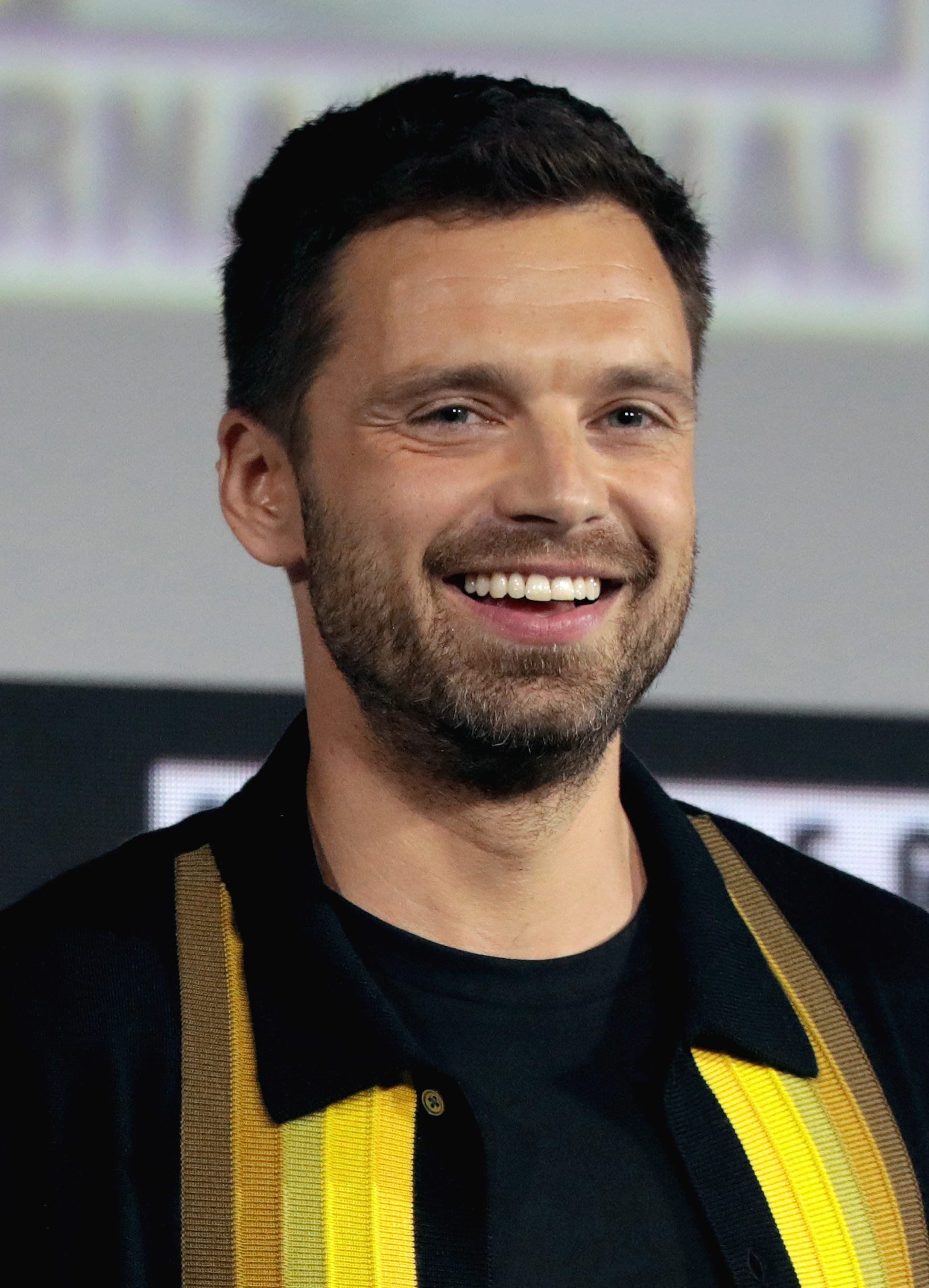
Stan at the 2019 San Diego Comic-Con

Stan's next appearance in the MCU was 2019's Avengers: Endgame, in which he briefly appears again as Barnes. The entirety of the cast except Robert Downey Jr. did not receive the full screenplay. Among other records, Avengers: Endgame became the highest-grossing film of all time with sales of $29. billion worldwide. Regarding its success, Stan remarked that "it's crazy to think it's [Avengers: Endgame] bigger than Titanic... it's exciting because ten years worth of filmmaking went into that movie." That same year, he headlined Drake Doremus's romantic drama Endings, Beginnings opposite Shailene Woodley and Matthew Gray Gubler, and Todd Robinson's war drama The Last Full Measure as a Pentagon staffer.

In 2020, Stan starred in Antonio Campos's psychological thriller film The Devil All the Time, replacing Chris Evans as a corrupt deputy after he personally recommended Stan for the role. He had three weeks to prepare, wearing prosthetics to simulate weight gain and studying movies with actors Tommy Lee Jones—whom he co-starred with in Captain America; The First Avenger—and John Wayne. He also starred in the romantic drama film Monday the same year.

Stan was announced in 2019 to co-star in the MCU television series The Falcon and the Winter Soldier alongside Anthony Mackie, reprising their respective roles as Barnes and Sam Wilson. The pair previously expressed interest in starring in a film together, and Marvel executive Kevin Feige took a "hands-on" approach to the series' development. The series follows the duo as they team up to stop anti-patriots who believe the world was better during the Blip. Head writer Malcolm Spellman explained that Barnes did "nothing but fight" over the past 100 years and, after removing his programming, has an identity crisis while adjusting to life in the 21st-century and making amends for his past. During filming, he injured his ankle from performing a boat stunt and broke his toe. The Falcon and the Winter Soldier ran on Disney+ from March to April 2021, and became the most-viewed series of April across multiple streaming platforms. Stan and Mackie were praised for their individual performances and chemistry; they won the shared MTV Movie & TV Award for Best Duo.

Stan appeared in Simon Kinberg's The 355 in 2022, an action thriller about a group of spies who work together to stop a terrorist organization from starting World War III. He reunites with The Martian co-star Jessica Chastain in the film, playing a CIA officer who is her character's previous love interest. The release was delayed by the COVID-19 pandemic from January 2021 to January 2022, becoming a commercial disappointment. He next starred in Mimi Cave's Hulu original film Fresh (2022) as a black market cannibal. For inspiration, he consulted psychiatrist Dorothy Otnow Lewis, who studied the psychology of serial killers such as Ted Bundy. Jeff Conway of Forbes called it his best performance to that point, and Tara Brady of The Irish Times said Stan was "charming" and "makes for an enjoyable, maddeningly earnest villain."

Stan next portrayed rock musician Tommy Lee in Pam & Tommy (2022), a Hulu biographical miniseries based on the marriage between Lee and actress and model Pamela Anderson during the time their personal sex tape was stolen in 1995. He underwent a physical transformation for the part, which included losing a drastic amount of weight, spending hours to have tattoos painted, piercing his nipples, and wearing a prosthetic penis. He additionally learnt to play the drums, which he described as "pretty terrifying", and contributed vocals to two songs on the series' soundtrack. The series premiered to plaudits for Stan's performance, and The Guardian's Lucy Mangan thought that he resembled Lee "aesthetically, vocally, and in every mannerism". Anderson later revealed she was not consulted about production of the series and criticized its producers, while Lee endorsed Stan. He was nominated for the Critics' Choice Television Award for Best Actor in a Movie/Miniseries, the Golden Globe Award for Best Actor – Miniseries or Television Film, and the Primetime Emmy Award for Outstanding Lead Actor in a Limited Series.

In 2023, Stan starred alongside Julianne Moore in Benjamin Caron's anthology thriller film Sharper, which is based on a script that appeared in the 2020 Black List. K. Austin Collins from Rolling Stone thought Stan and Moore's talents were wasted on its writing. He also made a cameo in Dexter Fletcher's action comedy film Ghosted at Chris Evans' request. Stan joined the ensemble of the biographical drama Dumb Money (2023), another film for Gillespie about the GameStop short squeeze, as entrepreneur Vlad Tenev. In his review for Empire magazine, John Nugent cited him among other cast members as "broad, capable, [and] watchable".

=== 2024–present: Widespread acclaim and expansion ===
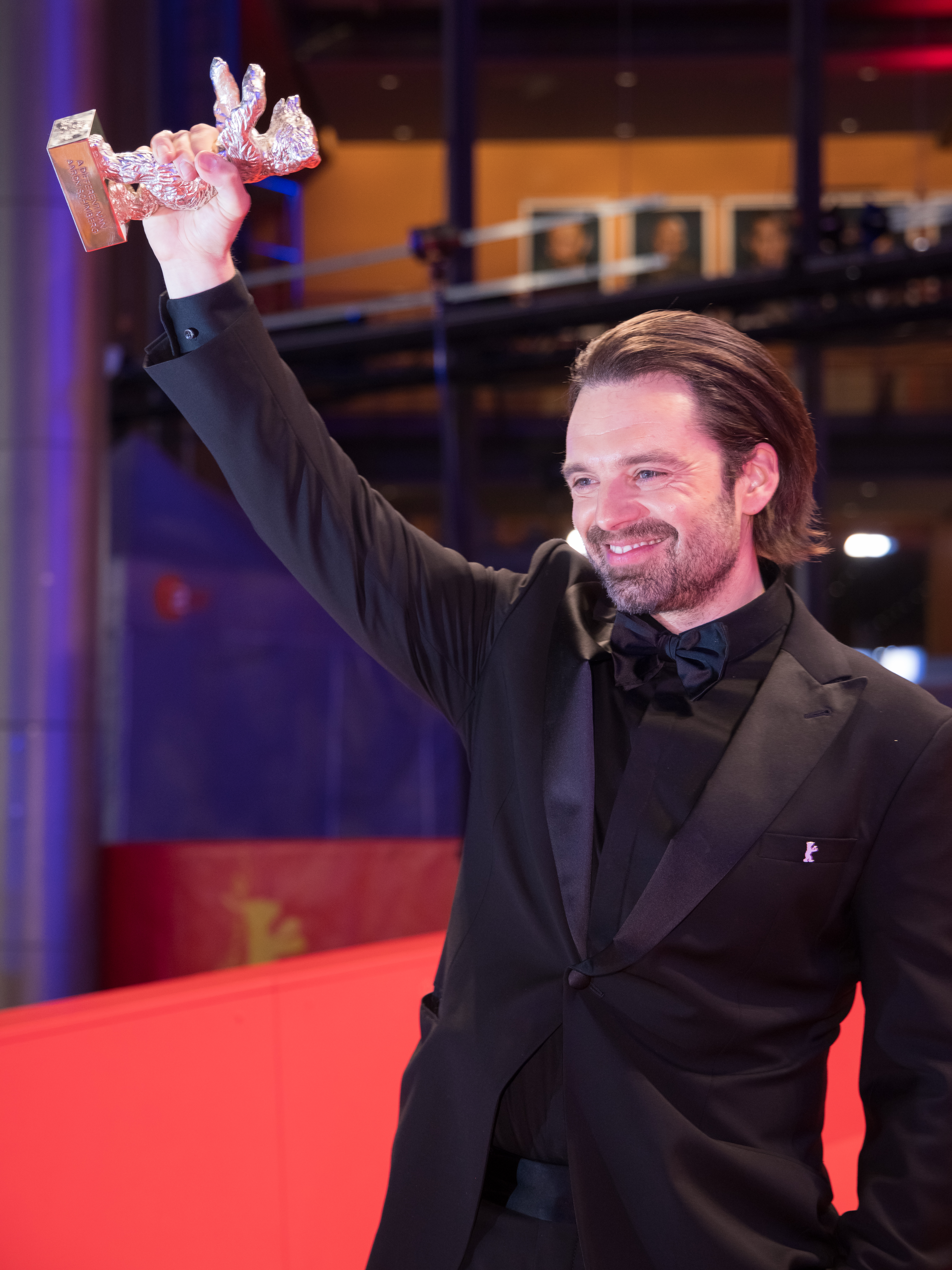
Stan at the 2024 Berlinale, where he won the Silver Bear for Best Leading Performance

In 2024, Stan starred in Aaron Schimberg's dark comedy thriller film A Different Man, which is about a disfigured actor with neurofibromatosis who undergoes a medical procedure to change his appearance. He was nervous to portray the condition as he felt that no matter what research he did, he would not do it justice; co-star Adam Pearson, who has neurofibromatosis, advised Stan on his performance. He wore extensive prosthetic makeup which took two hours to apply and weighed two pounds, and kept it on while traveling in New York City to study public reactions. In addition to playing the lead role, he served as an executive producer. He recalled, "I felt a much bigger attachment than I usually do as an actor in a way... you can help add more to the making of it in some capacity". Stan received numerous plaudits for his performance, with Jessica Kiang of Sight and Sound writing that he was "beautifully, brutally ill-at-ease playing a man who has never quite believed he deserved either of his faces". He won the Golden Globe Award for Best Actor – Musical or Comedy and the Silver Bear for Best Lead Performance.

In the same year, Stan portrayed Donald Trump in Ali Abbasi's biographical drama The Apprentice. He was initially hesitant to star in the film, but was encouraged to sign on by Jessica Chastain in 2023. He took many steps to prepare for the part during pre-production, listening to a younger Trump's voice as he did daily tasks, imitating his speech and how his mouth moved. He consumed peanut butter and jelly sandwiches, ramen with soy sauce, and Coca-Colas to gain weight before the film was temporarily suspended, after which he bulked for another film that later got suspended, leading him to reverse course again; he gained fifteen pounds. He reported nightly panic attacks while filming and, among other controversies, Trump derided the project as "malicious defamation" and Stan dropped out of a planned appearance on Variety Studio: Actors on Actors because publicists did not want to discuss the film. Though The Apprentice underperformed commercially, Stan's acting was highly praised by writers at BBC and The Hollywood Reporter, who commended his efforts to go "beyond impersonation to capture the essence of the man" and his "excellent, nuanced performance that could make Trump sympathetic, whatever your political leanings." He was nominated for the Academy Award for Best Actor, the British Academy Film Award for Best Actor in a Leading Role, and the Golden Globe Award for Best Actor – Drama.

Stan reprised the character of Bucky Barnes in the MCU twice in 2025, with an uncredited cameo in Captain America: Brave New World and as a leading actor in Thunderbolts*, which sees Barnes elected as a member of the United States House of Representatives and leads a group of antiheroes. Stan likened his role in Thunderbolts* to that of Jack Nicholson's character Randle McMurphy in the film One Flew Over the Cuckoo's Nest (1975), reasoning that they both worked to unite a group of chaotic individuals. Although the film performed below expectations at the box-office, Ed Power of The Independent described Stan as the "beating heart" and "MVP" of the MCU, while Erik Kain of Forbes wrote that Thunderbolts* proved "how much he [Stan] really deserves his own movie" in the franchise. He was nominated for the Kids' Choice Award for Favorite Butt-Kicker. The same year, he was invited to join the Academy of Motion Picture Arts and Sciences.

Stan at the premiere of Fjord in 2026

In 2026, Stan reunited with his A Different Man co-star Renate Reinsve in Cristian Mungiu's legal drama film Fjord, which follows a Romanian-Norwegian conservative couple facing intense scrutiny after moving to the wife's progressive Norwegian hometown. Because Stan had left Romania "in a very chaotic way" as a child, he saw the film as an opportunity "to rebond [sic]" with his birth country and an "invitation to be more tolerant" of different viewpoints. It was his first role spoken in Romanian, for which he prepared by shaving his hair to simulate hair loss and wearing fake teeth. Justin Chang of NPR observed that the film polarized audiences, but commended Stan for evoking genuine sympathy despite the rigidity of the character's beliefs; similarly, Deadline Hollywood's Pete Hammond called Stan "excellent" and Vulture's Alison Willmore thought it was the actor's "most ambitious" and "deft" performance to date.

Also in 2026, Stan produced the Romanian independent drama A River's Gaze, following a single mom and her teenage son over four seasons in rural Romania, which he says evoked his "desire to be more involved with Romania creatively". He will next reprise the role of Barnes in the MCU film Avengers: Doomsday, which is set for release in late 2026. Similar to the production of Avengers: Endgame, a majority of the actors including Stan did not receive the full script while filming. He is also slated to enter the Batman film franchise as Harvey Dent in Matt Reeves' action film The Batman: Part II, co-starring alongside MCU co-star Scarlett Johansson, set for release in early 2028.

== Artistry and public image ==
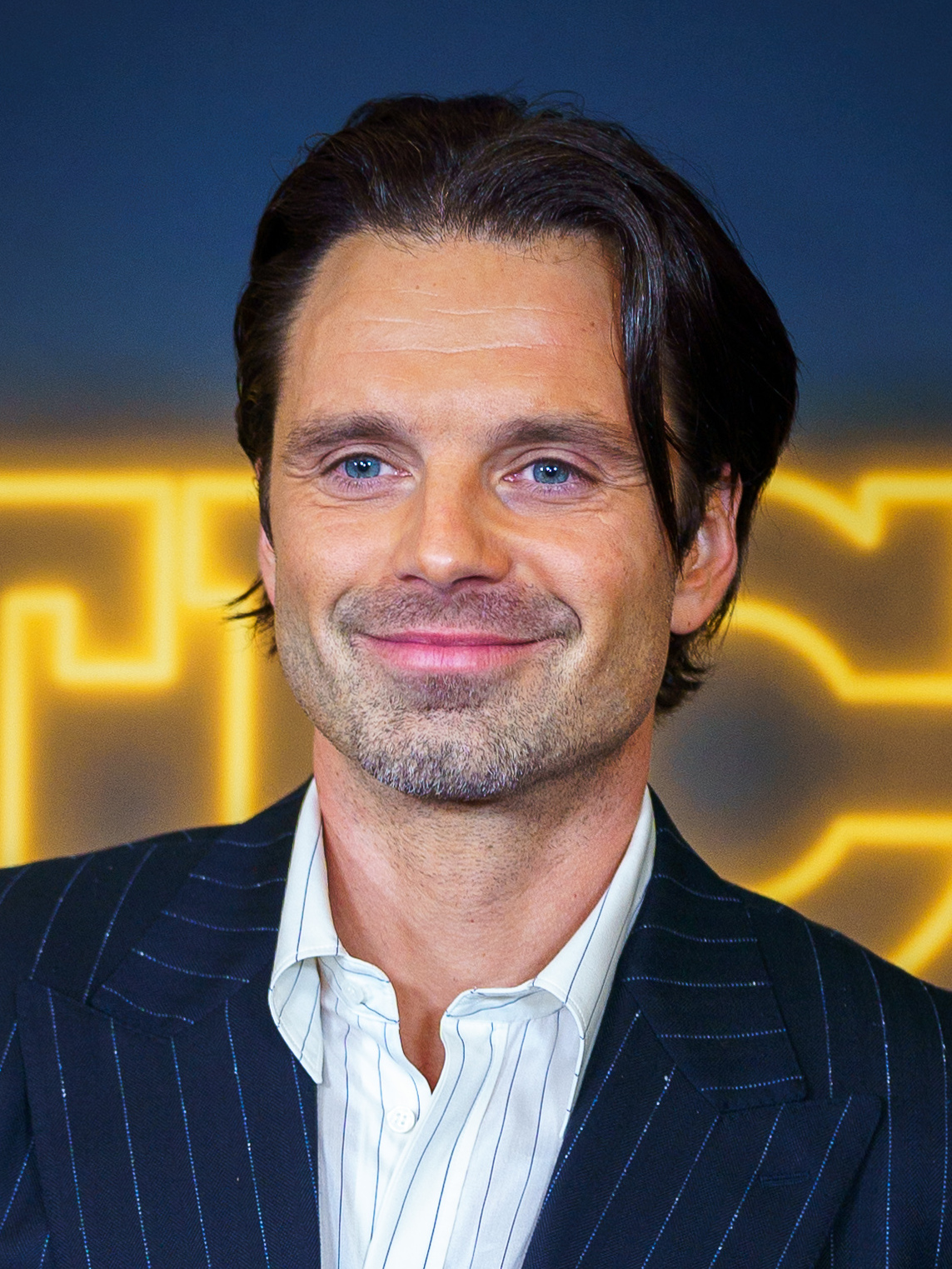
Stan at the premiere of The Apprentice in 2024

Stan is known for his versatility across comedy, drama, and action films, frequently portraying characters who are "usually tortured young men" or controversial real-life figures, including his best-known role as Bucky Barnes in the Marvel Cinematic Universe (MCU). Since starring in I, Tonya (2017), he has preferred to challenge himself with darker, harder, and more unconventional roles, aiming to select projects that do not ignore the "very dark" state of the world and filmmakers who are "fearless" in storytelling. He additionally prioritizes a strong work ethic, recognizing after performing in Talk Radio (2007) that "you can't take anything for granted; you gotta show up every day, no matter what's going on in your life."

Stan's acting style is rooted in his training with the Meisner technique at Rutgers University and his experience at Shakespeare's Globe. He emphasizes "bring[ing] in the truth of that day" to his performances and cites Christian Bale and MCU co-stars Robert Downey Jr. and Scarlett Johansson as influences. His preparation for specific roles involves meticulous research and dramatic physical and psychological transformations, including losing significant weight for Pam & Tommy (2022) and traveling in New York wearing facial prosthetics simulating neurofibromatosis for A Different Man (2024). Despite this immersive preparation, he has criticized method acting and the practice of staying in character off-camera to the detriment of the production, deeming it "a very irresponsible, narcissistic, kind of self-indulgent thing."

Critics have frequently highlighted Stan's career scope and dramatic range. The New York Observer profiled his performances as "marked by intensity and versatility, making him a sought-after actor in both blockbuster and independent films." Ixone Arana, a journalist for El País, similarly described him as "chameleonic" and "adept at stepping into the skin of very different characters". His evolution has led to industry acclaim, as observed by Annie Banks of MovieWeb, who called Marvel a "stepping stone" towards establishing himself as an "in-demand leading man" across mainstream cinema. Madeline Leung Coleman, a writer for New York and Vulture, recognized that while the character of Bucky Barnes was his best known role, Stan "quietly become one of the best art-house actors of our time". Publications such as BBC and Variety have further distinguished him as "one of the most interesting and versatile actors around", "one of our most exciting", and "one of the most recognizable stars".

Stan notes that he often feels self-conscious during media appearances and finds red carpet events to be artificial environments. He stated that he once "couldn't live without" social media but has since come to believe it can cause irreversible psychological damage to children, criticizing the normalization of online negativity and arguing that it encourages reactive hostility and judgment instead of curiosity and independent thinking. Critics have noted his simple and replicable approach to fashion, though Stan describes his personal style as merely "a collage of things". GQ India highlighted the accessibility and consistency of his wardrobe since his tenure on Gossip Girl, calling it "boy next door meets Hollywood, but is easy to copy". He has promoted numerous brands including BOSS and Cartier, and was ranked by Esquire magazine as the third-best dressed man of 2019.

== Political views and activism ==
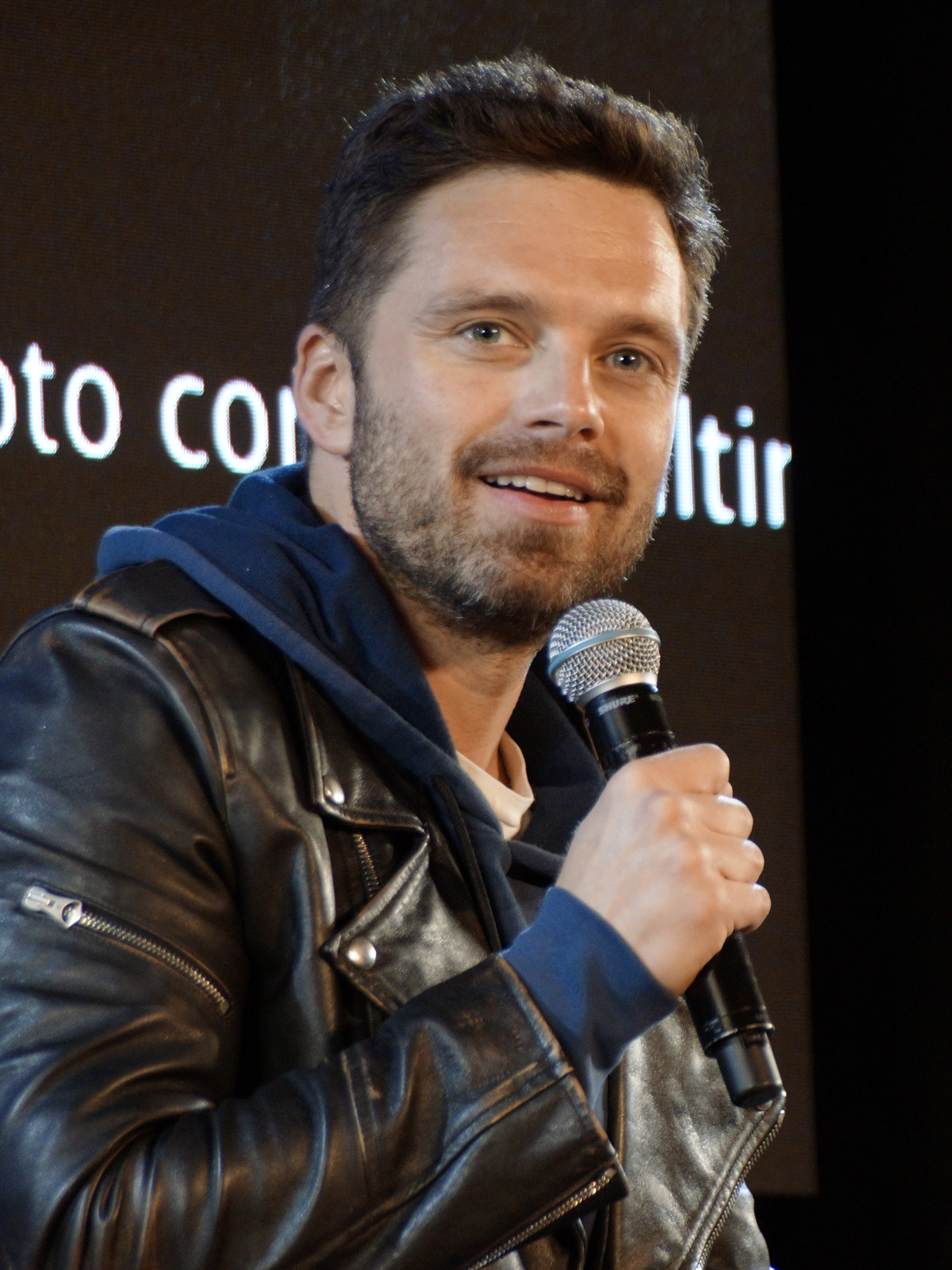
Stan speaking at a convention in 2019

Although Stan is not publicly affiliated with a political party, his views are shaped by his own experiences escaping Communist Romania as a child and immigrating to the United States. He is open to different viewpoints and ideologies, criticizing the practice of "being blind and absolute in our thinking, whichever side you're on" as it "doesn't seem to be moving us forward." Following his 2024 portrayal of Trump in The Apprentice, he strongly criticized him for ruling through "power and mistrust and paranoia", describing him as a "paranoid, scared little man" who "ain't caring about your situation." At a press conference for Fjord, he further remarked that the impact of Trump's 2025 presidential term was "not a laughing matter... I think we're in a really, really bad place."

Stan is an LGBTQ ally and advocates for a positive media representation of LGBTQ people, dismissing the idea of treating queer characters as novelties on television and stating that "movies are for people to relate to in whatever way they want". He wore a Time's Up pin at the 2018 Golden Globes and endorses the MeToo movement, stating that he felt the need "to support stories that have been, and still need to be told" and praising its exposure of systemic issues. He has called for an end to ableism and judgment around disfigurement, using his speech at the 2025 Golden Globes to encourage acceptance by "continuing to champion stories that are inclusive." On combating broader discrimination as an actor, he tries to participate in "movies that bring up conversations and different points of view… as long as we can continue to do that fearlessly, then I think we can actually push back".

Stan has supported various charitable efforts and organizations throughout his career, including the Chadwick Boseman Foundation, the Claire's Place Foundation, the Make-A-Wish Foundation, the non-profit Our Big Day Out, and the Ronald McDonald House New York. He performed in a 2017 production of The Children's Monologues for Dramatic Need, which raised funds for underprivileged South African communities, and took part in a 2018 table read of scripts by students from the non-profit Ghetto Film School, which offers free classes to aspiring filmmakers. In response to the January 2025 Southern California wildfires, he made the initial donation to start the Claire's Fire Emergency Fund, a relief initiative helping families navigate the health and financial crises caused by the fires.

== Personal life ==
Stan has dated Annabelle Wallis (pictured) since 2022 and they have one child.

Stan was raised in the Romanian Orthodox Church, though he has described himself as not "especially religious" in adulthood. He has described himself as an introvert who learned to be extraverted, and revealed his experiences with body dysmorphia in 2019, and with anxiety and obsessive–compulsive disorder in 2024. He reasons that this "keeps [him] connected to the planet" and grounds him with others. He prefers not to discuss his personal relationships, although he recognizes that "it's really difficult nowadays to be able to have any privacy whatsoever".

Stan had relationships with his Gossip Girl co-star Leighton Meester from 2008 to 2010—later referring to her as his first "serious love"—and his Once Upon a Time co-star Jennifer Morrison from 2012 to 2013. Afterwards, he dated his Spread co-star Margarita Levieva from 2014 to 2016, and actress Alejandra Onieva from 2020 to 2021. He began a relationship with actress Annabelle Wallis in 2022, and they welcomed their first child in 2026. The couple live in New York City, where Stan has resided most of his life.

== Acting credits and accolades ==
Stan's films as a leading or supporting actor have grossed over $7 billion worldwide. (Note: If including cameos in Ant Man (2015), Black Panther (2018), and Captain America: Brave New World (2025), his box-office total exceeds $9 billion.) According to Rotten Tomatoes, his most critically acclaimed films include Captain America: The Winter Soldier (2014), The Martian (2015), Captain America: Civil War (2016), Logan Lucky (2017), I, Tonya (2017), Avengers: Endgame (2019), A Different Man (2024), and Fjord (2026). His accolades include a Golden Globe Award, as well as nominations for an Academy Award, a British Academy Film Award, two Critics' Choice Awards, and a Primetime Emmy Award.

== See also ==
- List of actors with Academy Award nominations
- List of Golden Globe winners
- List of Romanian Academy Award winners and nominees
