= List of Academy Award winners and nominees from Romania =

This is a list of Academy Award winners and nominees from Romania.

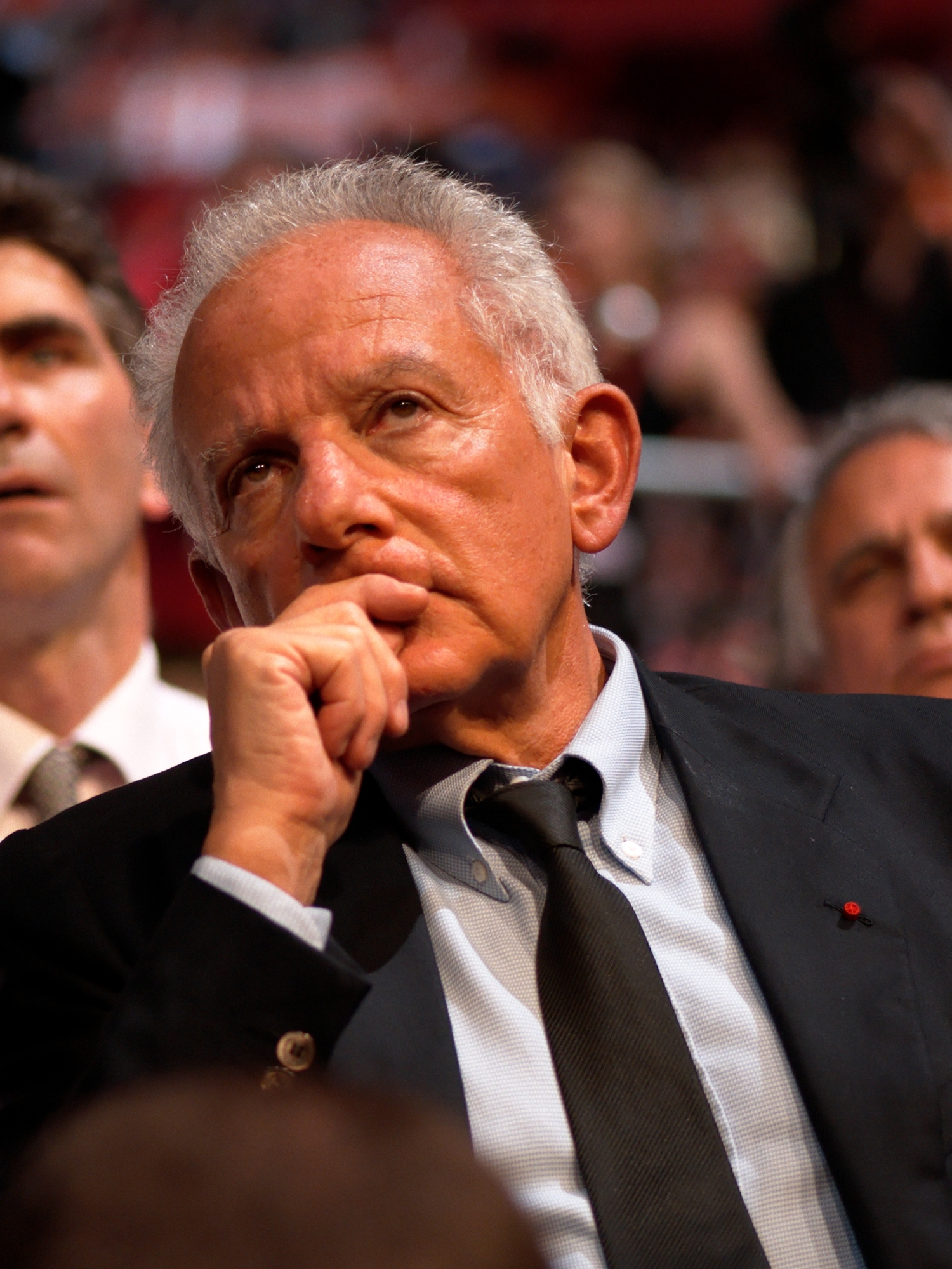
Romanian-born French director Marin Karmitz was nominated for Best Live Action Short Film.

== Best Picture ==
Best Picture
Year	Name	Film	Status	Milestone / Notes
1953	John Houseman	Julius Caesar	Nominated	Romanian-born British-American producer and actor.

== Best Actor ==
Best Actor
Year	Name	Film	Status	Milestone / Notes
2024	Sebastian Stan	The Apprentice	Nominated	Romanian and American actor.

== Best Supporting Actor ==
Best Actor in a Supporting Role
Year	Name	Film	Status	Milestone / Notes
1973	John Houseman	The Paper Chase	Won	Houseman was a Romanian-born British-American actor and producer.

== Best Actress ==
Best Actress in a Leading Role
Year	Name	Film	Status	Milestone / Notes
2011	Natalie Portman	Black Swan	Won	Israeli American actress with Romanian Jewish heritage.

== Best Supporting Actress ==
Best Actress in a Supporting Role
Year	Name	Film	Status	Milestone / Notes
1996	Lauren Bacall	The Mirror Has Two Faces	Nominated	American actress born to Romanian and Belarusian heritage.

== Best Adapted Screenplay ==
Best Adapted Screenplay
Year	Name	Film	Status	Milestone / Notes
1973	Robert Towne	The Last Detail	Nominated	American-born of Romanian and Russian descent.
1984	Robert Towne	Greystoke: The Legend of Tarzan, Lord of the Apes	Nominated	Shared with Michael Austin.
1992	Michael Tolkin	The Player	Nominated	American-born of Romanian-jewish and Ukrainian-jewish descent.

== Best Original Screenplay ==
Best Original Screenplay
Year	Name	Film	Status	Milestone / Notes
1974	Robert Towne	Chinatown	Won	Father Romanian jew
1975	Robert Towne	Shampoo	Nominated	Shared with Warren Beatty.

== Best Story ==
Best Story
Year	Name	Film	Status	Milestone / Notes
1934	Arthur Caesar	Manhattan Melodrama	Nominated	
1940	Bella and Samuel Spewack	My Favorite Wife	Nominated	
1955	Henri Troyat	The Sheep Has Five Legs	Nominated	

== Best International Feature Film ==
Best International Feature Film
Year	Film	Original Title	Status	Director(s)	Notes
2020/21	Collective	Colectiv	Nominated	Alexander Nanau	

== Best Documentary Feature ==
Best Documentary Feature
Year	Name	Film	Status	Milestone / Notes
1977	Miles Mogulescu	Union Maids	Nominated	Shared with Jim Klein and Julia Reichert.
2020/21	Alexander Nanau; Bianca Oana	Collective	Nominated	

== Best Production Design ==
Best Production Design
Year	Name	Film	Status	Milestone / Notes
1941	Nathan Juran	How Green Was My Valley	Won	Born in Austrian part of Austro-Hungarian Empire
1946	Nathan Juran	The Razor's Edge	Nominated	
1966	Richard Sylbert	Who's Afraid of Virginia Woolf?	Won	Born in Brooklyn, U S
1974	Richard Sylbert	Chinatown	Nominated	
1975	Richard Sylbert	Shampoo	Nominated	
1981	Richard Sylbert	Reds	Nominated	
1984	Richard Sylbert	The Cotton Club	Nominated	
1990	Richard Sylbert	Dick Tracy	Won	

== Best Live Action Short Film ==
Best Live Action Short Film
Year	Director	Film	Status	Milestone / Notes
1966	Marin Karmitz	Turkey the Bridge	Nominated	
1974	Julian Chagrin	The Concert	Nominated	(father romanian-jewish)
1976	Julian Chagrin	The Morning Spider	Nominated	
1976	Andre R. Guttfreund	In the Region of Ice	Won	(mother romanian)
2025	Natalie Musteata	Two People Exchanging Saliva	Won	Romanian-American. Shared with Alexandre Singh.

== Honorary Award ==
Honorary Academy Award
Year	Name	Notes	Milestone
1973	Edward G. Robinson (Posthumous)	"who achieved greatness as a player, a patron of the arts and a dedicated citizen...in sum, a Renaissance man. From his friends in the industry he loves."	First person of Romanian origin to be awarded an Honorary Academy Award.
2009	Lauren Bacall	"in recognition of her central place in the Golden Age of motion pictures."	

== Nominations and winners ==
No. of wins	No. of nominations
7	28
