= 71 Fragments of a Chronology of Chance =

1994 film by Michael Haneke

- Poster
- German: 71 Fragmente einer Chronologie des Zufalls
- Directed by: Michael Haneke
- Written by: Michael Haneke
- Produced by: Veit Heiduschka
- Starring: Gabriel Cosmin Urdes; Lukas Miko; Otto Grünmandl; Anne Bennent; Udo Samel
- Cinematography: Christian Berger
- Edited by: Marie Homolkova
- Production companies: ARTE; Zweites Deutsches Fernsehen; Wega Film
- Distributed by: Wega Film
- Release date: 18 May 1994; (Cannes)
- Running time: 96 minutes
- Countries: Austria; Germany
- Languages: German; Romanian

71 Fragments of a Chronology of Chance (German: 71 Fragmente einer Chronologie des Zufalls) is a 1994 drama film written and directed by Michael Haneke. It has a fragmented storyline as the title suggests, and chronicles several seemingly unrelated stories in parallel, but these separate narrative lines intersect in an incident at the end of the film. The film is set in Vienna from October to December 1993. Haneke refers to 71 Fragments of a Chronology of Chance as the last part of a trilogy, the other parts of which are his preceding two films The Seventh Continent and Benny's Video.

== Plot ==
The film opens with intertitles which introduce the mass killing in detail. It then chronicles in flashbacks the previous few months of several people in Vienna. A young Romanian boy sneaks across the border at night, wading through a swamp and hiding in the back of a truck. In Vienna he lives on the streets as a beggar. A security worker makes pickups at a bank. At home he argues with his wife and says prayers at great length. A young man steals weapons from a military armory. A college student plays games with his friends in which they bet against each other. He bets his watch against a stolen pistol. A retired man sits at home watching TV, talking at great length to his daughter who is too busy to spend time with him. A married couple tries to adopt a young girl.

The Romanian boy is picked up by authorities and his story receives news coverage. He is taken in by the couple who wanted to adopt the girl. While out doing errands, the wife leaves him in the car while she goes inside the bank. At the same time, the retired man goes to the bank under the guise of picking up his pension, but he's really there to see his daughter who works there.

The college student stops for gas. Short on cash, he goes across the street to use the ATM, but it is out of order. Stressed out and in a rush, he goes inside the crowded bank and attempts to cut to the front of the line, but he is assaulted by another customer. He leaves the bank and walks back to his car where he retrieves his gun. He returns to the bank, where he begins firing indiscriminately at the people inside. He then walks back to his car and shoots himself.

== Characters ==
The drama consists of varied characters in each storyline: a Romanian boy who immigrated illegally into Austria and lives on the streets of Vienna; a religious bank security worker; a lonely old man staring at a TV screen; a childless couple considering adoption; a frustrated student and so on.

== Film division ==
The film is divided into a number of variable-length "fragments" separated by black pauses and apparently unrelated to each other. The film is characterized by several fragments that take the form of video newscasts unrelated to the main storylines. News footage of real events is shown through video monitors. Newscasts report on the Bosnian War, the Somali Civil War, the South Lebanon conflict, the Kurdish–Turkish conflict, and molestation allegations against Michael Jackson.

== Reception ==
Adam Bingham of Senses of Cinema wrote, "Formally and conceptually, the film is one of the most challenging narrative works of the 1990s." Lexicon of International Films described the film as "An extremely matter-of-fact chronology of events that presents the lives of the individual participants [...]. A very cold film that offers no psychological explanation and, through its detached perspective, creates lasting unease."

Manohla Dargis of The New York Times called it "an icy-cool study of violence both mediated and horribly real", concluding that "For Mr. Haneke, the point seems less that evil is commonplace than that we don’t engage with it as thinking, actively moral beings. We slurp our soup while Sarajevo burns on the boob tube."

On the review aggregator website Rotten Tomatoes, 67% of 6 critics' reviews are positive. On Metacritic, the film has a weighted average score of 71 out of 100, based on 8 critics, indicating "generally favorable reviews".

== Cast ==
- Gabriel Cosmin Urdes as Marian Radu (Romanian Boy)
- Lukas Miko as Max
- Otto Grünmandl as Tomek
- Anne Bennent as Inge Brunner
- Udo Samel as Paul Brunner
- Branko Samarovski as Hans
- Claudia Martini as Maria
- Georg Friedrich as Bernie
- Alexander Pschill as Hanno
- Klaus Händl as Gerhard
- Corina Eder as Anni
- Sebastian Stan as Kid in Subway
