= Pam & Tommy =

2022 American biographical drama television miniseries

- Promotional poster
- Genre: Biographical drama; Black comedy; Crime; Romance
- Created by: Robert Siegel
- Based on: "Pam and Tommy: The Untold Story of the World's Most Infamous Sex Tape" by Amanda Chicago Lewis
- Starring: Lily James; Sebastian Stan; Nick Offerman; Seth Rogen; Taylor Schilling
- Composer: Matthew Margeson
- Country of origin: United States
- Original language: English
- No. of episodes: 8

Production
- Executive producers: Megan Ellison; Sue Naegle; Ali Krug; Seth Rogen; Evan Goldberg; James Weaver; Alex McAtee; Robert Siegel; D.V. DeVincentis; Craig Gillespie; Dylan Sellers; Dave Franco
- Cinematography: Paula Huidobro
- Editors: Tatiana S. Riegel; Annette Davey; Michael Giambra; Eric Kissack
- Running time: 32–51 minutes
- Production companies: Robert Siegel And Jen Cohn's Production Company; Limelight; Point Grey Pictures; Annapurna Television

Original release
- Network: Hulu
- Release: February 2 – March 9, 2022

Pam & Tommy is a 2022 American biographical drama television miniseries chronicling the marriage between actress and model Pamela Anderson and Mötley Crüe drummer Tommy Lee, played by Lily James and Sebastian Stan, respectively, during the period their unauthorised sex tape was made public. Based on the 2014 Rolling Stone article "Pam and Tommy: The Untold Story of the World's Most Infamous Sex Tape" by Amanda Chicago Lewis, the series was created for Hulu by Robert Siegel, and is produced by Point Grey Pictures and Annapurna Television.

The series development was announced in 2018, with James Franco attached to direct the miniseries and play Lee. It was given a series order in December 2020 by Hulu, announcing James to play Anderson and Stan to replace Franco following the latter's departure from the project. Casting announcements were made throughout 2021 and filming took place in Los Angeles between April and July 2021.

The first three episodes of Pam & Tommy premiered on Hulu on February 2, 2022, and were directed by Craig Gillespie, with the rest of the episodes debuting weekly. It received ten Primetime Emmy Award nominations, including Outstanding Limited Or Anthology Series and acting nominations for James, Stan, and Rogen.

== Premise ==
Pam & Tommy depicts the turbulent 3-year marriage between Pamela Anderson and Tommy Lee, with particular emphasis on personal home videos of Anderson and Lee filmed on a houseboat on Lake Mead that were stolen, spliced together, and sold as a sex tape.

== Cast and characters ==
=== Main ===
- Lily James as Pamela Anderson
- Sebastian Stan as Tommy Lee
- Nick Offerman as Uncle Miltie
- Seth Rogen as Rand Gauthier
- Taylor Schilling (Note: Schilling is only credited as "Starring" in select episodes.) as Erica Gauthier

=== Recurring ===
- Pepi Sonuga as Melanie
- Andrew Dice Clay as Louis "Butchie" Peraino
- Mozhan Marnò as Gail Chwatsky
- Fred Hechinger as Seth Warshavsky
- Paul Ben-Victor as Richard Alden, Pam and Tommy's lawyer
- Mike Seely as Hugh Hefner
- Medalion Rahimi as Danielle, Erica's girlfriend
- Don Harvey as Anthony Pellicano, a private investigator
- Adam Ray as Jay Leno
- Iker Amaya as Nikki Sixx
- Paul Guzman as Vince Neil
- Chris Mann as Mick Mars
- Zack Gold as Ace
- Sam Meader as Zakk

=== Guest ===
- Jason Mantzoukas as the voice of Tommy's penis (in "I Love You, Tommy")
- Maxwell Caulfield as Bob Guccione, the owner of Penthouse (in "Uncle Jim and Aunt Susie In Duluth")
- John Billingsley as Bruce Hendricks, the Penthouse defense counsel (in "Pamela in Wonderland")
- Brian Huskey as Albert, a gambler in debt (in "Destroyer of Worlds")
- Clint Howard as himself playing his character Schmitz in Barb Wire (in "Destroyer of Worlds")

== Production ==
=== Development ===
The series is based on a 2014 Rolling Stone article about the theft of the tapes. Siegel found it hard to believe the events had not been the subject of a film or series previously, with the producers optioning the rights to the article to serve as the basis of the series. Co-showrunners Siegel and D.V. DeVincentis argue that most of the "basic plot beats" came from that article.

The series was first announced in 2018, with Seth Rogen and Evan Goldberg developing the project under their production company Point Grey Pictures and James Franco attached to direct the miniseries and play Tommy Lee. By December 2020, Franco had left the series and it was announced that Hulu had greenlit the project with an eight-episode limited series order. Craig Gillespie was set to direct with Robert D. Siegel writing and Rogen and Goldberg executive producing the miniseries. Tatiana S. Riegel, a frequent collaborator of Gillespie's, was attached as editor.

=== Casting ===
Alongside the series order announcement, Lily James and Sebastian Stan were cast to play the titular characters, with Rogen also cast in a main role. In April 2021, Nick Offerman and Taylor Schilling were announced as main cast members, with Pepi Sonuga, Andrew Dice Clay, Spenser Granese and Mozhan Marnò in recurring roles. In June 2021, Fred Hechinger was announced as a part of the cast in a recurring role. In January 2022, it was revealed that Jason Mantzoukas was voicing Tommy Lee's penis.

=== Filming ===
The series began filming on April 5, 2021, in Los Angeles and finished on July 30, 2021. The two main actors went through long make-up processes to closely resemble their characters. Lily James wore a prosthetic forehead, chest, dentures, blue contact lenses, and a blonde wig. Sebastian Stan spent hours getting up to 30 tattoos painted on him, grew out and dyed his hair, and wore brown contact lenses, a prosthetic penis, and pierced nipples. Their wardrobe was not custom made, but purchased second-hand based on the clothes Anderson and Lee wore during that period of 1995–1998.

== Episodes ==
| No. | Title | Directed by | Written by | Original release date |
|---|---|---|---|---|
| 1 | "Drilling and Pounding" | Craig Gillespie | Robert Siegel | February 2, 2022 |
Carpenter Rand Gauthier is renovating a bedroom suite in the Malibu mansion of Tommy Lee, the drummer for rock band Mötley Crüe. Lee frustrates Gauthier with frequent, drastic, last-minute changes to the floor plan, all of which Gauthier has to charge to his credit card. Despite Lee promising to pay half the costs upfront, neither Gauthier nor his coworker Lonnie have received a cent. One day, Gauthier accidentally walks in on Lee's wife, television star Pamela Anderson, while she is half-naked in the kitchen. Lee, angered by the incident, dismisses Gauthier and Lonnie's work as shoddy and fires the men without pay. The following day, Gauthier attempts to retrieve a toolbox he left behind. However, he is held at gunpoint by Lee who claims the toolbox as "collateral" until he can hire new workers. Angered by Lee's abusive treatment, Gauthier decides to exact revenge on the rock star. Returning a few months later during the night, Gauthier sneaks onto Lee's property and steals a large safe from the garage. Among its contents is an Hi8 cassette tape. Due to the format, Gauthier takes it to a friend and former boss, pornographic director Uncle Miltie. They discover the tape contains a sexually explicit home video made by Lee and Anderson on their honeymoon.
| 2 | "I Love You, Tommy" | Craig Gillespie | Robert Siegel | February 2, 2022 |
Two months earlier, Pamela Anderson meets Tommy Lee at a nightclub. He follows her to Cancún, where the Baywatch cast are attending a conference for the show's syndicators. Lee coaxes Anderson away from the business dinner and the two engage in a wild night of debauchery. Despite Lee's being newly divorced from his marriage to actress Heather Locklear two years earlier, he impulsively proposes and Anderson accepts. They are married in front of friends on a beach. Upon returning to the United States, the couple learn about one another's tastes and decide where they should live. They move into Lee's house in Southern California, where he is beginning a renovation. After meeting the contractors, Lee announces that he has changed his mind about the theme and layout of the new suite.
| 3 | "Jane Fonda" | Craig Gillespie | D.V. DeVincentis | February 2, 2022 |
Miltie and Gauthier decide to sell Lee and Anderson's sex tape, but are rejected by various pornographic distributors out of fear of legal action. While attempting to fix his estranged porn star wife Erica's toilet, Gauthier orders a rare float cup valve off a website, sparking an idea. Gauthier and Miltie meet with Deep Throat producer and loan shark Butchie Peraino. Convincing him they can confidentially sell the sex tape on a website and ship it worldwide, Peraino agrees to finance their endeavor. Meanwhile, Anderson is growing tired of her treatment on the Baywatch set. She attends meetings regarding the promotion of her upcoming feature film Barb Wire and joyfully discovers she is pregnant with Lee's child.
| 4 | "The Master Beta" | Lake Bell | Matthew Bass & Theodore Bressman | February 9, 2022 |
Gauthier and Miltie's website becomes tremendously successful. Lee finally discovers his safe is missing and calls the police. When the LAPD informs Lee his case will not be their top priority, Anderson panics, remembering their sex tape was in the safe. She convinces Lee to hire private investigator Anthony Pellicano to find and retrieve it. Listening to Lee's long list of people he has angered over the years, Pellicano suspects Gauthier is the likely thief. Tracking him to his apartment, Pellicano beats Gauthier and demands the cassette be handed over when he returns in a couple days. Pellicano then informs Lee and Anderson that Gauthier is his prime suspect and assures them he will have the cassette by the weekend. However, while on the set of Baywatch, Anderson is horrified to find crewmen watching the sex tape. She and Lee find Miltie's website and learn the tape has already circulated nationally. An angry Lee sends a biker gang to Miltie's studio and Gauthier's apartment. Miltie escapes to Europe while Gauthier takes refuge in Erica's house. Anderson suffers a miscarriage and angrily bashes in a paparazzo's windshield.
| 5 | "Uncle Jim and Aunt Susie In Duluth" | Gwyneth Horder-Payton | Brooke Baker & D.V. DeVincentis | February 16, 2022 |
A depressed Lee worries his fame has passed him by, while Anderson continues to find success. After an intoxicated Lee gets into a public altercation at The Viper Room, Anderson is warned by her agent of the negative publicity her husband might bring to her career. After discovering new band Third Eye Blind has bumped Mötley Crüe out of the studio's best recording booth, Lee's anger strains his relationship with Anderson. Adding fuel to the fire, the couple's sex tape falls into the hands of Bob Guccione, owner of Penthouse magazine. Unsure of his intentions, Lee and his lawyers preemptively sue Guccione for invasion of privacy, against Anderson's wishes. In retaliation, Guccione demands stills from the video be published. Lee's lawsuit ends up making the Los Angeles Times, bringing the video widespread attention to the point that Jay Leno tells jokes about the tape on The Tonight Show. As the couple's lawsuit moves forward, Anderson is informed only she will be testifying against Penthouse.
| 6 | "Pamela in Wonderland" | Hannah Fidell | Sarah Gubbins | February 23, 2022 |
In 1989 Vancouver, Anderson joins her boyfriend at a Canadian Football League game where she appears on the Jumbotron. She is approached by a representative for Labatt Brewing Company, who asks her if she would consider becoming their new model. After accepting the gig, Anderson is contacted by Playboy to shoot some test shots for them. Anderson travels with her mother to the Playboy Mansion and has fun doing the shoot. Hugh Hefner advises Anderson to remember that the price for her modeling is not the same as her worth as a person. In 1995, Anderson and Lee travel to Lake Mead for their honeymoon, during which time they film themselves having sex on Lee's boat. After returning home, Lee tells Anderson he wants to keep the tape for sentimental reasons. In the present day, Anderson testifies at the deposition and becomes increasingly distraught at the invasive and judgmental questions asked. After the Penthouse lawyer plays portions of the sex tape, Anderson excuses herself to the bathroom and vomits. As the day's deposition ends, Anderson tells her lawyer she refuses to come back and answer any further questions.
| 7 | "Destroyer of Worlds" | Lake Bell | D.V. DeVincentis | March 2, 2022 |
As bootlegs of the sex tape begin dominating the market, Gauthier's business has all but dried up. An annoyed Peraino intimidates Gauthier to pay him the $50k he is owed. Unable to contact Miltie, Gauthier desperately tries to blackmail Lee for money in exchange for shutting down the website. The two meet in the Dodger Stadium parking lot but Lee, rather than pay, points out how Gauthier's desire to get back at him has ruined Anderson's life, setting the money on fire. When Gauthier returns empty handed, Peraino forces him to instead repay his debt by shaking down a gambler that owes money, but Gauthier is unable to go through with it. Later that night, Erica tells Gauthier that the sex tape has made her sympathize with Lee. When he breaks down and admits he stole and leaked the tape as revenge, a disgusted Erica throws him out of the house. Gauthier, distraught, returns to the gambler's house and beats him. Meanwhile, a newly pregnant Anderson goes on press tours to promote the premier of Barb Wire. However, all of the interviews veer into discussion about the sex tape. Furthermore, the couple learn their case has been thrown out with the judge ruling in favor of Penthouse. Anderson berates Lee for not seeing the hidden meaning behind the judgement, claiming that she has lost her rights to privacy and bodily autonomy. After attending the premiere of Barb Wire, Anderson and Lee sneak into a regular screening and overhear audience members mocking her performance. Meanwhile, Seth Warshavsky tries to come up with a way to combat his cam girls' low views on Clublove.com.
| 8 | "Seattle" | Gwyneth Horder-Payton | Robert Siegel | March 9, 2022 |
A heavily pregnant Anderson struggles to get work, getting passed up for L.A. Confidential and Austin Powers. Lee deals with a similar career decline as Mötley Crüe's Generation Swine underperforms and the band loses gigs to newer grunge groups. The two discover a bootleg of the sex tape is being streamed on Clublove.com for free. They attempt to sue Warshavsky, though the case is quickly dropped. Warshavsky offers to buy the exclusive streaming rights to the tape from the couple, explaining that once he has ownership, he will add a paywall to limit access to the footage. Though Anderson is open to giving away the rights, Lee rejects the offer. Gauthier is horrified by the work he's done to pay off his debt, so Butchie agrees to call things square in exchange for $10,000. While shaking down a gambler, Gauthier discovers Warshavsky's site. He initially plans to confront Warshavsky, but after a tarot reading he realizes he needs to make amends for what he has done. Gauthier attempts to apologize to Lee and Anderson when they are leaving their home, only to get run over. He then apologizes to Erica, who assures him he is not a bad person. Warshavsky offers to buy the original tape from Gauthier for $10,000, which he takes with the intent of paying off Butchie. Instead, he gives it to Erica so she can finalize their divorce. Anderson decides to leave Lee, but he convinces her to travel to Lake Mead with him. She later catches him bragging about the tape in the hotel bar, which prompts her to return home without Lee. There, Anderson begs him to sign over the rights to the tape. After a violent fit, Lee relents and signs the contract. Anderson tearfully tells him "it's over", and after their son is born, Anderson and Lee get a divorce.

== Release ==
Pam & Tommy premiered on February 2, 2022, on Hulu, with the first three episodes and the rest debuting on a weekly basis. The series was also released simultaneously internationally on Disney+ under the Star hub (including Hotstar in India), and on Star+ in Latin America.

== Reception ==
=== Viewership ===
According to market research company Parrot Analytics, which looks at consumer engagement in consumer research, streaming, downloads, and on social media, Pam & Tommy reached second place among breakout shows, which are the most in-demand series that have premiered in the past 100 days, during its first full week of data from February 5-11, 2022, achieving 32.9 times the average series demand. It was the third most in-demand breakout series from February 26 - March 4, 2022. It and ranked as the fourth most in-demand new show during the week of March 12-18, 2022. Nielsen Media Research, which records streaming viewership on U.S. television screens, reported that the series was watched for 312 million minutes. Whip Media, which tracks viewership data for the more than 19 million worldwide users of its TV Time app, calculated that Pam & Tommy was the tenth most-watched original series across all platforms in the United States during the week of February 6, 2022. It later climbed to sixth place during the week of March 13, 2022.

=== Critical reception ===
The review aggregator website Rotten Tomatoes reports a 78% approval rating based on 102 reviews, with an average rating of 7.3/10. The site's critical consensus reads: "Pam & Tommy sometimes undercuts its own critique of cultural voyeurism with lurid stylization, but Lily James' performance gives this sleazy opus an undeniable heart." On Metacritic, the series has a score of 70 out of 100, based on 42 reviews, indicating "generally favorable reviews".

James Poniewozik of The New York Times found the show "consistently entertaining" and praised the performances of the actors, calling James' portrayal a "sneakily complex performance", and complimented the narrative alongside the practical effects. Alison Foreman of Mashable praised the performances of the whole cast, especially James and Stan, complimented the soundtrack and pace, and stated that the show keeps "the entertainment value high". Inkoo Kang of The Washington Post stated that the transformation of James and Stan is a "casting and makeup coup", while saying that the production is admirable due to its "madeleine-esque needle drops to its relish in the baggy tackiness of so much '90s fashion.," although claiming that the show exploits Anderson's story. Alec Bojalad of Den of Geek reviewed Pam & Tommy positively, stating that James as Anderson and Stan as Lee are "excellent choices", praising the development of the characters, and saying that "it transports viewers into the mind of a real woman enduring real internet-era trauma."

Lucy Mangan of The Guardian rated the miniseries 4 out of 5 stars, saying that Pam & Tommy is a "warm, funny, intelligent and rather moving drama," while calling the performances from Lily James as Anderson and Sebastian Stan as Lee "astonishing", stating that "each achieve the feat of uncannily resembling – aesthetically, vocally, and in every mannerism – the real-life people, without descending into mimicry." Abhishek Srivastava of The Times of India rated the series 4 out of 5 stars, praised the performances of the actors and Craig Gillespie's direction, and stated that the miniseries manages to provide a captivating story. Martin Brown of Common Sense Media rated the series 3 out of 5 stars, writing, "In real life, Anderson and Tommy Lee came off as slightly more sympathetic than they do in this version of the story, which focuses more on the sensational aspects of the story and characters than on why they might be relevant to viewers nearly 25 years later."

Clint Worthington of RogerEbert.com rated the series 2.5 out of 4 stars and said that the series is entertaining, called the performances of the actors "strong" and the direction "stylish", but found that the show is a violation of privacy that is "filtered through the glossy lens of prestige TV." Laura Martin of BBC rated the show 2 out of 5 stars, complimented the performances of James and Stan, and found some scenes amusing, but stated that the show exploits the traumatic personal life of Anderson.

=== Response from Pamela Anderson ===
In her 2023 Netflix documentary Pamela, a Love Story, Pamela Anderson said that she was not consulted about the production of the series. Anderson said that "the idea of the whole thing happening was just really crushing for me" and called the show's producers "assholes... you still owe me a public apology". However, she felt no ill against Lily James, who she thought was "just doing her job", and invited James to attend the premiere of Pamela, a Love Story. Critics, journalists, and academics posited that the series was profiting off of Anderson's trauma without her consent, and likely doing further harm to her. Pamela, a Love Story verified those claims, in Anderson's own words. Producers of the series were able to develop the series without her participation, permission, or consent by optioning the rights to an article published by Rolling Stone in 2014. Some critics felt that this was a similar violation of privacy that mirrored the tape originally being stolen and distributed without Anderson's and Lee's consent. In January 2026, Anderson shared on Radio Andy that she had felt uncomfortable being near Rogen at the 83rd Golden Globe Awards, and that she still hadn't received an apology from the showrunners.

=== Accolades ===
| Year | Award | Category | Nominee(s) | Result | Ref. |
|---|---|---|---|---|---|
| 2022 | Hollywood Critics Association TV Awards | Best Streaming Limited or Anthology Series | Pam & Tommy | Nominated | |
| 2022 | Hollywood Critics Association TV Awards | Best Actor in a Streaming Limited or Anthology Series or Movie | Sebastian Stan | Nominated | |
| 2022 | Hollywood Critics Association TV Awards | Best Actress in a Streaming Limited or Anthology Series or Movie | Lily James | Nominated | |
| 2022 | Hollywood Critics Association TV Awards | Best Supporting Actor in a Streaming Limited or Anthology Series or Movie | Seth Rogen | Won | |
| 2022 | Hollywood Critics Association TV Awards | Best Directing in a Streaming Limited or Anthology Series or Movie | Lake Bell (for "The Master Beta") | Won | |
| 2022 | Hollywood Critics Association TV Awards | Best Directing in a Streaming Limited or Anthology Series or Movie | Craig Gillespie (for "I Love You, Tommy") | Nominated | |
| 2022 | MTV Movie & TV Awards | Best Performance in a Show | Lily James | Nominated | |
| 2022 | MTV Movie & TV Awards | Here for the Hookup | Pam & Tommy | Nominated | |
| 2022 | Primetime Emmy Awards | Outstanding Limited or Anthology Series | Megan Ellison, Sue Naegle, Ali Krug, Seth Rogen, Evan Goldberg, James Weaver, Alex McAtee, Robert Siegel, D.V. DeVincentis, Craig Gillespie, Dylan Sellers, Dave Franco, Chip Vucelich, and Sarah Gubbins | Nominated | |
| 2022 | Primetime Emmy Awards | Outstanding Lead Actor in a Limited or Anthology Series or Movie | Sebastian Stan | Nominated | |
| 2022 | Primetime Emmy Awards | Outstanding Lead Actress in a Limited or Anthology Series or Movie | Lily James | Nominated | |
| 2022 | Primetime Emmy Awards | Outstanding Supporting Actor in a Limited or Anthology Series or Movie | Seth Rogen | Nominated | |
| 2022 | Primetime Creative Arts Emmy Awards | Outstanding Casting for a Limited or Anthology Series or Movie | Mary Vernieu and Lindsay Graham Ahanonu | Nominated | |
| 2022 | Primetime Creative Arts Emmy Awards | Outstanding Contemporary Costumes | Kameron Lennox, Danielle Baker, and Petra Larsen (for "The Destroyer of Worlds") | Nominated | |
| 2022 | Primetime Creative Arts Emmy Awards | Outstanding Single-Camera Picture Editing for a Limited or Anthology Series or Movie | Tatiana S. Riegel (for "I Love You, Tommy") | Nominated | |
| 2022 | Primetime Creative Arts Emmy Awards | Outstanding Period And/Or Character Hairstyling | Barry Lee Moe, Erica Adams, George Guzman, and Helena Cepeda (for "Jane Fonda") | Nominated | |
| 2022 | Primetime Creative Arts Emmy Awards | Outstanding Period And/Or Character Makeup (Non-Prosthetic) | David Williams, Jennifer Aspinall, Jason Collins, Abby Lyle Clawson, Mo Meinhart, Dave Snyder, Bill Myer, and Victor Del Castillo (for "Jane Fonda") | Won | |
| 2022 | Primetime Creative Arts Emmy Awards | Outstanding Sound Mixing For A Limited Or Anthology Series Or Movie | Nick Offord, Ryan Collins, and Juan Cisneros (for "The Master Beta") | Nominated | |
| 2022 | ReFrame Stamp | IMDbPro Top 200 Scripted TV Recipients | Pam & Tommy | Won | |
| 2022 | Set Decorators Society of America Awards | Best Achievement in Décor/Design of a Television Movie or Limited Series | Nya Patrinos, Ethan Tobman, and David Batchelor Wilson | Nominated | |
| 2023 | Costume Designers Guild Awards | Excellence in Period Television | Kameron Lennox (for "I Love You, Tommy") | Nominated | |
| 2023 | Critics' Choice Awards | Best Movie/Miniseries | Pam & Tommy | Nominated | |
| 2023 | Critics' Choice Awards | Best Actor in a Movie/Miniseries | Sebastian Stan | Nominated | |
| 2023 | Critics' Choice Awards | Best Actress in a Movie/Miniseries | Lily James | Nominated | |
| 2023 | Golden Globe Awards | Best Limited or Anthology Series or Television Film | Pam & Tommy | Nominated | |
| 2023 | Golden Globe Awards | Best Actor in a Limited or Anthology Series or Television Film | Sebastian Stan | Nominated | |
| 2023 | Golden Globe Awards | Best Actress in a Limited or Anthology Series or Television Film | Lily James | Nominated | |
| 2023 | Golden Globe Awards | Best Supporting Actor in a Limited or Anthology Series or Television Film | Seth Rogen | Nominated | |
| 2023 | Make-Up Artists and Hair Stylists Guild Awards | Best Period and/or Character Make-Up in a Television Series, Television Limited or Miniseries or Television New Media Series | David Williams, Jennifer Aspinall, Dave Snyder, Bill Myer | Won | |
| 2023 | Make-Up Artists and Hair Stylists Guild Awards | Best Period and/or Character Hair Styling in a Television Series, Television Limited or Miniseries or Television New Media Series | Barry Lee Moe, Erica Adams, George Guzman, Helena Cepeda | Nominated | |
| 2023 | Make-Up Artists and Hair Stylists Guild Awards | Best Special Make-Up Effects in a Television Series, Television Limited or Miniseries or Television New Media Series | David Williams, Jason Collins, Mo Meinhart, Abby Lyle Clawson | Won | |
| 2023 | Producers Guild of America Awards | Best Limited Series | Pam & Tommy | Nominated | |
| 2023 | Satellite Awards | Best Actress – Miniseries or Television Film | Lily James | Won | |
| 2023 | Writers Guild of America Awards | Limited Series | Brooke Baker, Matthew Bass, Theodore Bressman, D.V. DeVincentis, Sarah Gubbins, and Robert Siegel | Nominated | |

== See also ==
- Tabloid television
- Dark Side of the 90s
