= Fjord (film) =

2026 film by Cristian Mungiu

- Romanian theatrical release poster
- Directed by: Cristian Mungiu
- Written by: Cristian Mungiu
- Produced by: Cristian Mungiu; Tudor Reu; Andrea Berentsen Ottmar; Dyveke Bjøkly Graver
- Starring: Sebastian Stan; Renate Reinsve
- Cinematography: Tudor Vladimir Panduru
- Edited by: Mircea Olteanu
- Music by: Kaspar Kaae
- Production companies: Mobra Films; Why Not Productions; Eye Eye Pictures; Snowglobe Film; Aamu Film Company; Filmgate Films
- Distributed by: Forum Film România (Romania); Le Pacte (France)
- Release dates: 18 May 2026 (Cannes); 13 June 2026 (Romania); 19 August 2026 (France)
- Running time: 146 minutes
- Countries: Romania; France; Norway; Sweden; Denmark; Finland
- Languages: Norwegian; English; Romanian; Swedish
- Box office: $3 million

Fjord is a 2026 legal thriller family drama film written, directed and co-produced by Cristian Mungiu. A co-production of Romania, France, Norway, Sweden, Denmark and Finland, it stars Sebastian Stan and Renate Reinsve as a conservative Romanian-Norwegian couple facing scrutiny after moving to the wife's progressive remote Norwegian hometown. It is loosely inspired by the true story of the Bodnariu family (renamed Gheorghiu in the film) whose children were forcefully taken from them by the authorities in Norway.

The film had its world premiere in the main competition of the 2026 Cannes Film Festival on 18 May, where it received a 12-minute standing ovation and won the Palme d'Or, the François Chalais Prize, the FIPRESCI Prize, the Prize of the Ecumenical Jury, and the Prix de la Citoyenneté. It received critical acclaim, with particular praise for its performances and screenplay, and was released theatrically in Romania on 13 June.

It was also selected as the Romanian entry for the Best International Feature Film at the 99th Academy Awards.

== Plot ==
Romanian engineer Mihai Gheorghiu and his Norwegian wife Lisbet, a nursing home worker, are devout evangelical Christians who have recently moved with their five children from Romania to Norway to be closer to Lisbet's family after the death of Mihai's parents. Their next door neighbours are Mats Halberg, the local school headmaster; his wife Mia, an attorney; Noora, Mats' daughter from a previous marriage; and Åke, Mats' widowed and disabled father.

The Gheorghius' oldest children, Elia and Emmanuel, become friends with Noora and proselytize to her, with Elia at one point seemingly walking on water; Elia and Noora's closeness inspires jealousy in Noora's friend Elsa. Frida, a teacher at their school who also works with Child Welfare Services, notices bruises on Elia's body during physical education class, and, suspecting child abuse, reports the Gheorghiu family to Child Services. Mihai admits to police that he spanks the children but he and Lisbet deny having abused their children. Child Services, acting on Mihai's admissions and testimony from Elia and Emmanuel, remove them from their home and put them in foster homes pending an investigation, and a parallel criminal investigation is opened.

The Gheorghius suspect religious discrimination and hire an attorney recommended by their church, but she drops their case after the first meeting with Child Services, finding Mihai too difficult to work with. Lisbet asks Mia to represent them. Mia asks Frida about her report, and comes to believe that there may have been a miscommunication between Frida and the children due to the language barrier. (Note: The children primarily speak Romanian at home and English and Norwegian at school, but they are not yet proficient in Norwegian.) Frida also says that she made an earlier report to Child Services after Judith, the Gheorghius' youngest daughter, told a lesbian classmate that her sexual orientation was contrary to God's will. Mia agrees to represent the Gheorghius.

Frustrated with delays from Child Services, Mihai reaches out to the Romanian embassy and conservative Christian groups, leading to an international campaign to reunite the Gheorghius with their children. Noora sneaks Elia a cell phone, and secretly visits her and Emmanuel at their foster home.

At the final Child Services hearing, Mia attempts to establish doubt as to whether Elia's bruising was caused by parental abuse, the children fighting amongst themselves, or wrestling in physical education class. The attorney for Child Services questions if Mihai believes that corporal punishment is an acceptable form of discipline because of his religiosity and his Romanian culture. The judicial panel decides to conditionally return the children to the Gheorghius, pending a ruling in their criminal trial.

Mia declines to represent the Gheorghius in their criminal trial. Mihai begins to suspect a romantic attraction between Elia and Noora, to his dismay. Fearing that they will be convicted and lose their children forever, the family flees to Denmark. Noora tracks Elia's phone and rushes after them to say goodbye, but arrives just after their ferry has departed. As Noora rushes after, she realizes she is walking on water.

== Cast ==
- Sebastian Stan as Mihai Gheorghiu
- Renate Reinsve as Lisbet Gheorghiu
- Lisa Carlehed as Mia Halberg, Mihai and Lisbet's neighbour
- Henrikke Lund-Olsen as Noora Halberg, Mats' daughter
- Vanessa Ceban as Elia Gheorghiu, Mihai and Lisbet's eldest daughter
- Jonathan Ciprian Breazu as Emmanuel Gheorghiu, Mihai and Lisbet's eldest son
- Ellen Dorrit Petersen as Gunda
- Lisa Loven Kongsli as Frida
- Markus Tønseth as Mats Halberg, Mia's husband and the school headmaster

== Production ==
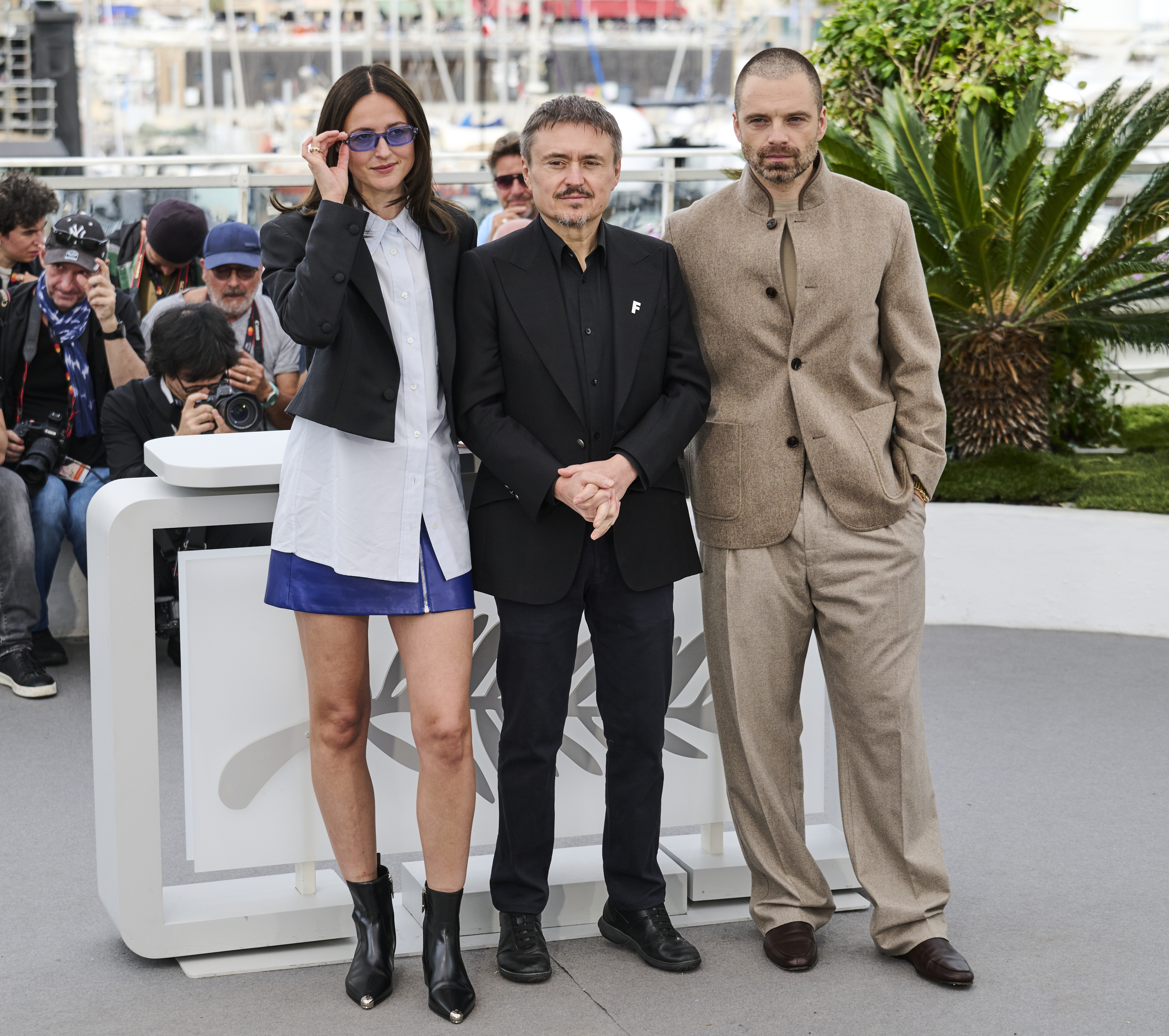
Left to right: Reinsve, Mungiu, and Stan promoting the film at the Cannes Film Festival on 19 May 2026

The film is a co-production between Romania, Norway, Sweden, Denmark, Finland, and France. Mungiu and Tudor Reu produced the film with Romanian production company Mobra Films, alongside Why Not Productions, Eye Eye Pictures, Snowglobe Film, Aamu Film Company, and Filmgate Films.

=== Filming ===
Principal photography began in Hjørundfjorden, Norway in March 2025. Marius Winje Brustad served as production designer, Mircea Olteanu served as film editor, and Tudor Vladimir Pandoru served as cinematographer.

=== Music ===
The score for the film was composed by Danish composer Kaspar Kaae. The soundtrack was released by Plaza Mayor Company in digital formats on 7 July 2026.

==== Track listing ====
Fjord (Original Motion Picture Soundtrack)
| No. | Title | Length |
|---|---|---|
| 1. | "En Siste Gang (feat. Johannes Forsberg)" | 3:17 |
| 2. | "Shared Our Stories" | 3:31 |
| 3. | "Jeg Begyndte at Gå" | 3:26 |
| 4. | "What If I Told You" | 2:30 |
| 5. | "Meditation 1" | 4:10 |
| 6. | "Meditation 4" | 2:14 |
| 7. | "Spiritual 3" | 3:37 |
| 8. | "Meditation 2" | 5:16 |
| 9. | "Spiritual 5" | 2:32 |
| 10. | "Spiritual 1" | 2:54 |
| 11. | "Kids Song: Alle Meine Entchen" | 1:59 |
| Total length: | | 35:41 |

== Release ==
In May 2025, it was reported that Neon had purchased distribution rights for the United States, United Kingdom, Canada, Australia and New Zealand, while French distributor Goodfellas would manage worldwide distribution, with an expected 2026 release.

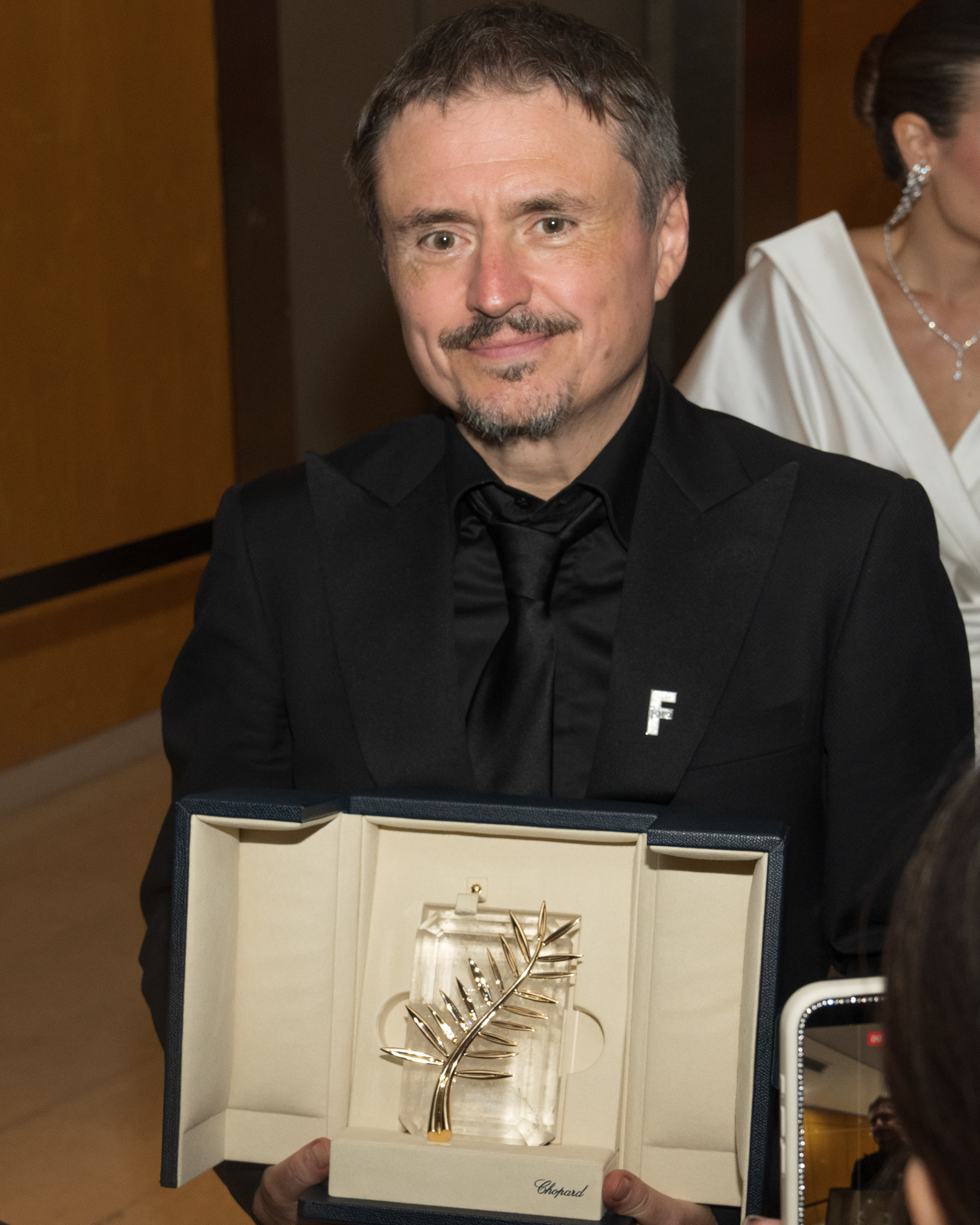
Mungiu holding the Palme d'Or awarded to Fjord, at the 2026 Cannes Film Festival

The film had its world premiere in the main competition of the 2026 Cannes Film Festival on 18 May, where it won the Palme d'Or. It was also screened in competition at the 73rd Sydney Film Festival. The film also screened at the Karlovy Vary International Film Festival and Hurtigruten Nordic Film Festival, both in July 2026. Additionally, it was screened in the Summer Screen Programme section of the 32nd Sarajevo Film Festival in August 2026. It had its North American premiere at the 53rd Telluride Film Festival. It was also selected for the Special Presentations section of the 2026 Toronto International Film Festival, the Perlak section at the 74th San Sebastián International Film Festival, and for the Spotlight Gala section of the 2026 New York Film Festival. It will also be screened in the Gala section of 39th Tokyo International Film Festival on 29 October 2026.

On 13 June 2026, Fjord had exclusive premiere screenings across Romania on 96 theaters, in 53 cities, and 315 screens. It had an unprecedented response from local audiences, becoming the most successful art film premiere in the country. Forum Film România secured Romanian distribution. It was released theatrically in France by Le Pacte on 19 August 2026, and in the United States by Neon on 9 October 2026. The Indian rights were acquired by Impact Films. Falcon Pictures acquired the Indonesian rights to the film.

It was also selected as the Romanian entry for the Best International Feature Film at the 99th Academy Awards, marking Mungiu's third film selected to represent Romania, following 4 Months, 3 Weeks and 2 Days (2007) and Beyond the Hills (2012).

== Reception ==
=== Critical response ===
On the review aggregator website Rotten Tomatoes, 92% of 162 critics' reviews are positive, with an average rating of 7.7/10. The website's consensus reads: "Presenting a knotty moral dilemma and refusing to provide easy answers, Cristian Mungiu's superbly well-acted Fjord has a chilly surface that belies a heated humanity beneath the frost." Metacritic, which uses a weighted average, assigned the film a score of 78 out of 100, based on 45 critics, indicating "generally favorable" reviews.

Guy Lodge of Variety wrote that Fjord is "sharply attuned to the world's ever-expanding possibilities for movement, misunderstanding and conflict". Lee Marshall of Screen Daily considered the film to be a "thought-provoking drama about conflicting values that feels, in the end, a little bloodless and underpowered". Pete Hammond of Deadline Hollywood lauded Fjord as "a fiercely intelligent and gripping movie that finds its power in providing no easy answers". Kat Rosenfield of The Free Press called it "an effective and beautiful work of cinema." Films Fatale called Fjord a "conversation starter" about "how different cultures can hold very different sets of values".

David Ehrlich of IndieWire gave the film a 'B+' rating, describing it as "a characteristically fraught and tangled drama" vivisecting the reactionary pitfalls of globalization. David Rooney of The Hollywood Reporter assessed the film to be "compellingly squirm-inducing, if far from the director's best" in the bottom line. Robbie Collin of The Telegraph rated the film 5 out of 5 stars, declaring it "a slow-burn provocation that knows exactly which buttons it is pressing".

Peter Bradshaw of The Guardian rated the film 2 out of 5 stars, billing it as an "anticlimactic, underpowered movie". He also criticised its win for the Palme d'Or, writing, "Fjord has the director's procedural mannerisms, but here they do not do real work in illuminating any very interesting truth; Fjord feels like a co-production contrivance, but certainly one that impressed [the Cannes] jury". Marshall Shaffer of Slant rated the film 2½ out of 4 stars, writing that the trial in the film "is far more interesting for what it reveals than how it resolves".

According to the Norwegian Broadcasting Corporation (NRK), the film is critical of the Norwegian Child Welfare Services.

=== Accolades ===
| Award | Date of ceremony | Category | Recipient | Result | Ref. |
|---|---|---|---|---|---|
| Cannes Film Festival | 23 May 2026 | Palme d'Or | Cristian Mungiu | Won | |
| Cannes Film Festival | 23 May 2026 | François Chalais Prize | Cristian Mungiu | Won | |
| Cannes Film Festival | 23 May 2026 | FIPRESCI Prize | Cristian Mungiu | Won | |
| Cannes Film Festival | 23 May 2026 | Prize of the Ecumenical Jury | Cristian Mungiu | Won | |
| Cannes Film Festival | 23 May 2026 | Prix de la Citoyenneté | Cristian Mungiu | Won | |
| European Film Awards | 16 January 2027 | Best European Film | Fjord | Pending | |
| European Film Awards | 16 January 2027 | Best European Director | Christian Mungiu | Pending | |
| European Film Awards | 16 January 2027 | Best European Screenwriter | Christian Mungiu | Pending | |
| European Film Awards | 16 January 2027 | Best European Actress | Renate Reinsve | Pending | |
| European Film Awards | 16 January 2027 | Best European Actor | Sebastian Stan | Pending | |

== See also ==
- List of submissions to the 99th Academy Awards for Best International Feature Film
- List of Romanian submissions for the Academy Award for Best International Feature Film
