= Monday (2020 film) =

Film by Argyris Papadimitropoulos

- Theatrical release poster
- Directed by: Argyris Papadimitropoulos
- Written by: Argyris Papadimitropoulos; Rob Hayes
- Produced by: Christos V. Konstantakopoulos; Brian Kavanaugh-Jones; Damian Jones; Deanna Barillari
- Starring: Sebastian Stan; Denise Gough
- Cinematography: Christos Karamanis
- Edited by: Napoleon Stratogiannakis
- Music by: Alexis Grapsas
- Production companies: Faliro House Productions; Automatik Entertainment; Protagonist Pictures
- Distributed by: IFC Films (United States); Paramount Pictures (United Kingdom); Tulip Entertainment (Greece)
- Release dates: September 11, 2020 (TIFF); April 16, 2021 (United States)
- Running time: 116 minutes
- Countries: United States; United Kingdom; Greece
- Language: English
- Box office: $30,932

Monday is a 2020 drama film directed by Argyris Papadimitropoulos, from a screenplay he co-wrote with Rob Hayes. It stars Sebastian Stan and Denise Gough.

The film had its world premiere on September 11, 2020, at the Toronto International Film Festival as part of TIFF Industry Selects. It was released in the United States on April 16, 2021, by IFC Films. The film received mixed reviews from critics.

== Plot ==
Meeting at a party in Athens, Mickey and Chloe instantly connect. They wake up naked on the beach Saturday morning surrounded by families - and police, who take them downtown. They are let go with a warning.

Chloe is leaving in two days because her toxic relationship ended, but must recover her purse from the party. Mickey invites her to his DJ gig on an island, until he can get it. They get to know one another, spending the day there. By the night's end, Mickey asks Chloe to stay. She refuses, so when her things arrive, they part awkwardly.

Argyris (Mickey's friend and business partner) realizes Mickey has fallen for Chloe, so they chase her to the airport. The gesture works, and soon they move in together. They fall in love... although they are polar opposites.

Mickey’s old bandmate tries to convince him to join her on the road. Mickey seems tempted, but when he sees Chloe, he decides against it.

Mickey and Argyris's freelance advertising jingle gig isn’t going well. They placate their client in the living room, while Chloe meets with an immigration client in the dining room.

Chloe and Mickey plan a party for all their friends. They’re meant to meet Aspa, his son's mother, beforehand but she ends up going alone, while he takes care of the party food. Aspa tells Chloe Mickey is a terrible father who's never bothered with Hector. When she returns home, he has not done as promised. Upset, she then unhappily discovers she's pregnant.

Takeout arrives ahead of the guests. Chloe is unimpressed, as Mickey had obviously forgotten. It is a disaster as their friends clash. Chloe and Mickey try to laugh about it afterwards however, it affects them.

A social worker informs them that Aspa has stipulated the visitation and guardianship must be shared between Chloe and Mickey, which troubles her more than Mickey. Chloe secretly has an abortion, pretending to have the stomach flu, so puts him off when he wants to have sex.

Chloe's ex Christos intimidates them both at a wedding, so Mickey gets drunk and belligerent. Argyris tries to stop him from sabotaging his relationship with Chloe, as she loves him. Unfortunately, Mickey embarrasses Chloe by drunkenly, halfheartedly proposing.

At Christmastime, the Friday before Hector’s first visit, they argue because Chloe is nervous. They joyfully learn a Greek song together to sing to Hector, then go out for one last carefree night before becoming responsible parents. At a club they have tequila, and Chloe insists they do cocaine, then they get bounced.

Chloe encourages Mickey to pull over so they can have sex immediately. She begins to cry and confesses to the abortion. He is not upset, which angers her. Their arguing alerts a security guard, so they must run.

Back at the motorcycle, remembering their first night together naked on the beach. Chloe convinces Mickey to relive it. They get on the cycle naked, then pull up next to a cop car at a red light. Chased, Mickey wants to pull over, but Chloe insists he keep going. Eventually they are cornered and stopped. Mickey complies, but Chloe resists arrest.

Like before, they are arrested naked and in the back of a police car. But now, Chloe is belligerent and assaults an officer, so they will not be treated so lightly. Taken to the station and charged, the court date is on Monday, so they will miss Hector’s visit tomorrow. Aghast, both beg to be let go until Monday, but to no avail. They are separated, and Chloe spends the weekend sleeping in a cell.

On Monday, Chloe's attorney gives her clothes, telling her everything will be fine. She's found guilty, but receives a suspended sentence and a fine. Chloe then discovers Mickey's case was dismissed. Returning home she confronts Mickey, there since Saturday. Christos got him out and the charges dropped. Chloe rages, but Mickey points out she is not innocent. She cries quietly to herself.

In the last scene, Mickey and Chloe are waiting outside a school for the doors to open. Small children come out and run into their parents' arms. Our last view is of Mickey and Chloe's smiling, expectant faces.

== Cast ==
- Sebastian Stan as Mickey
- Denise Gough as Chloe
- Dominique Tipper as Bastian
- Vangelis Mourikis as Takis
- Andreas Konstantinou as Christos
- Syllas Tzoumerkas as Manos
- Sofia Kokkali as Stephanie

== Production ==
In August 2018, it was announced that Sebastian Stan and Denise Gough had joined the cast of the film, with Argyris Papadimitropoulos directing from a screenplay he wrote alongside Rob Hayes.

== Release ==
Monday was originally scheduled to have its world premiere at the Tribeca Film Festival on April 15, 2020. However, the festival was postponed due to the COVID-19 pandemic.

The film premiered on September 11, 2020, at the Toronto International Film Festival as part of TIFF Industry Selects. In February 2021, IFC Films acquired U.S. distribution rights to the film and set it for an April 16, 2021, release.

== Reception ==
On review aggregator website Rotten Tomatoes, the film holds an approval rating of 49% based on 75 reviews, with an average rating of 5.6/10. The site's critics consensus reads: "Monday has attractive leads and a beautifully filmed setting, but fatal character flaws undermine the impact of this turbulent romance." According to Metacritic, which sampled 24 critics and calculated a weighted average score of 58 out of 100, the film received "mixed or average reviews".

Screen Rant gave the film a 2 out of 5 stars rating, stating that the film "fumbles its way through after a strong start and isn't interested in exploring or developing its characters as individuals or as a couple."
