= A Different Man (soundtrack) =

A Different Man (Original Motion Picture Soundtrack)

Film score by Umberto Smerilli
- Released: September 27, 2024
- Recorded: 2023
- Genre: Film score
- Length: 36:57
- Label: A24 Music
- Producer: Umberto Smerilli

Umberto Smerilli chronology
The Bunker Game (2022)	A Different Man (2024)

A Different Man (Original Score) is the film score to the 2024 film A Different Man directed by Aaron Schimberg starring Adam Pearson, Sebastian Stan, and Renate Reinsve. The film score is composed by Umberto Smerilli and released through A24 Music on September 27, 2024.

== Development ==
Schimberg sent the film script to Umberto Smerilli and was asked to compose an audition piece within 10 days. Smerilli who was on a vacation during that time, immediately reached home and read the first part of the script and composed a "somber and slow" waltz melody on piano with "something off but also maybe something romantic in it". The piece was composed within 20 minutes, after which Smerilli recorded a loose improvisation on his iPhone with his humming voice as an addition and mailed to Schimberg. He immediately liked the piece and confirmed his involvement in the film.

The demo theme was later orchestrated with a layer of strings, solo clarinet, piano and percussions, becoming the central point of the score. Smerilli wanted to convey several concepts into this theme without spoiling the sense of ambiguity in the script. The theme has multiple variations, ranging from solo piano to uptempo jazz energy, to overwhelming drama, and also the melancholy when Edward undergoes an experimental treatment and his old face crumbles off. Smerilli performed most of the instruments himself, including a contrabass clarinet which he bought and learnt for this score.

Smerilli took inspiration from opera and old Italian films, mostly those of which composed by Nino Rota, Duke Ellington and Bernard Herrmann, for incorporating black humor and arch fabulism, noting about the pre-conceived notions and beauty standards reflecting the inner thoughts of a man who cannot escape the ugly monster within himself. Schimberg felt the completed score left him in tears, as he thought " This is all the emotion that I put into the movie, and everything that I was feeling making this movie — this is it in musical form".

== Release ==
David Ehrlich of IndieWire wrote "Umberto Smerilli's woozy, clarinet-driven score makes hard truths melt away like warm butter sliding off a knife." Jordan Mintzer of The Hollywood Reporter mentioned that Smerilli's score "shifts between indie vibes and the classic melodies of Hollywood B-flicks." Christy Lemire of RogerEbert.com said, "Composer Umberto Smerilli's rich score beautifully reflects his tormented state, with just the slightest wink." James Mottram of NME wrote "A Different Man also comes scored by Umberto Smerilli, crafting vibrant music that seems to capture Ed's shifts in moods."

Jamie Tram of Australian Broadcasting Corporation wrote "Umberto Smerilli's jazzy, foreboding score brilliantly matches the film's mounting absurdity, descending into a soundscape best described as chaotic noir." Peter Debruge of Variety wrote "Umberto Smerilli's score [amplifies the] uneasy sense of identification." Robert Abele of Los Angeles Times noted that "Umberto Smerilli's striking dirge of a score" had established an "unforgiving, lose-yourself metropolis" which was reminiscent of Roman Polanski's The Tenant (1976).

Elizabeth Weitzman of Time Out wrote "Umberto Smerilli's outstanding score keeps pace with every moment, skittering from jittery nerves to ominous dread." Ty Burr of The Boston Globe wrote "Umberto Smerilli's gorgeous score, which marches Edward toward his fate with inexorable piano chords and swirling reeds." Lyvie Scott of Inverse called it a "morose, jazzy score".

== Track listing ==
No.	Title	Length
1.	"A Different Man" (Main Theme)	2:50
2.	"Melancholy"	3:16
3.	"Metamorphosys"	3:22
4.	"Abstract Night"	2:02
5.	"The Chase"	1:05
6.	"Disturbing March"	0:55
7.	"Habanera"	2:19
8.	"I Wanna Get Next to You" (Umberto Smerilli and Adam Pearson)	3:11
9.	"Monologue"	1:36
10.	"Going Mad"	2:04
11.	"Subconscious Dive"	4:15
12.	"Abstract Night" (Bonus Version)	2:44
13.	"A Different Man" (End Credits Suite)	7:18
Total length:		36:57

== Release history ==
Release history and formats for A Different Man (Original Motion Picture Soundtrack)
Region	Date	Format(s)	Label(s)	Ref.
Various	September 27, 2024	Digital download; streaming	A24 Music	
Various	January 17, 2025	LP	A24 Music	
