= Korsmo =

Korsmo may refer to the following people:

- Charlie Korsmo (born 1978), American former child actor turned lawyer
- Lisbeth Korsmo (1948–2017), Norwegian speed skater, cyclist, and Olympic medalist
- Arne Korsmo (1900–1968), Norwegian architect
- John Korsmo, American politician, father of Charlie
