= False =

False or falsehood most commonly refer to:

- False (logic), the negation of truth in classical logic
- Lie or falsehood, a type of deception in the form of an untruthful statement
- False statement, aka a falsehood, falsity, misstatement or untruth, is a statement that is false

== False ==
False may also refer to:

- false (Unix), a Unix command
- False, a 1992 album by Gorefest
- Matthew Dear or False (born 1979), American DJ and producer

== Falshood ==
Falshood may also refer to:

=== Film and television ===
- Falsehood (1952 film), an Italian melodrama film
- Falsehood (2001 film), an American short film
- "Falsehood" (2006), a television episode from xxxHolic, a Japanese anime.
- "Falsehood" (2020), a television episode from Detention, a Taiwanese supernatural horror drama.

=== Literature ===
- "Falsehood" (1869–1882), a set of verses from Ofudesaki, a scripture in Tenrikyo.
- "Falsehood" a short story by Al-Zayf in the collection Whisper of Madness (1938).
- "Falsehood" (2012), a chapter from Liar Game, a Japanese manga written by Shinobu Kaitani,
- Falsehood (1590), personified by Duessa, a fictional character in The Faerie Queene.
- Mr Falsehood (1894), a fictional characters in The House that Jack Built, played by Marie Dainton.
- Falsehood, a title of Baiji, a fictional character from Honkai Impact 3rd', science fantasy action role-playing game.

=== Music ===
- "Falsehood" (2011), a song from Tirtha by Vijay Iyer, American composer, pianist, bandleader, producer, writer, and professor, and with Prasanna and Nitin Mitta

== See also ==
- Anrita, falsehood in Hindu mythology
