= Adam Pearson =

Adam Pearson may refer to:

- Adam Pearson (sports executive) (born 1964), Hull football and rugby clubs
- Adam Pearson (actor) (born 1985), British actor
- Adam Pearson, guitarist with The Sisters of Mercy and others
