= Method Fest Independent Film Festival =

- Method Fest Independent Film Festival logo
- Location: Beverly Hills, California, U.S.
- Language: English
- Website: methodfest.com

The Method Fest Independent Film Festival is an independent film festival. The Method Fest is the Actor's Film Festival, a festival of discovery, seeking breakout-acting performances of emerging stars and established actors in story-driven independent films. The 13th The Method Fest Independent Festival was held in Beverly Hills, California, in March 2019. The festival is also dedicated to support the work of those who produce, make and work in independent film and to provide educational opportunities in independent filmmaking. The upcoming 14th The Method Fest Independent Film Festival will be held in Beverly Hills at the Fine Arts Theatre from March 20-26, 2020.

== 1999 ==
Best Feature:	Mud Season; dir. Anthony Hall	
John Garfield Award for Best Actor: (tie)	Noble Willingham The Corndog Man	Russ DeWees Mud Season
Geraldine Page Award for Best Actress:	Linda Shing Mud Season	
Best Director of a Feature Film:	Richard Schenkman, Went to Coney Island on a Mission from God, Be Back By Five	
Best Screenplay in a Feature:	Richard Schenkman, Went to Coney Island on a Mission from God, Be Back By Five	
Maverick Award for Quality in a Low-budget film:	My Brother Jack; dir. Anthony Caldarella	
Audience Award, Feature:	Do You Wanna Dance	
Best Actor, Feature Film:	Noble Willingham The Corndog Man	
Best Supporting Actor, Feature Film:	George Woodard Mud Season	
Best Supporting Actress in a Feature Film:	Daphne Ashbrooke Dumbarton Bridge	
Festival Director's Maverick Film Award:	Kirk Harris My Sweet Killer	Peter Gerety Went to Coney Island on a Mission from God, Be Back By Five
Jury Award for Best Short Film:	The Lonelys; dir. Henry Barrial	
Best Director, Short Film:	J. Miller Tobin 4 AM Open All Night	
Audience Award, Short Film:	Creampuff; dir.Jared Seide	
Best Actor in a Short Film:	Matt Casada The Lonelys	
Best Actress in a Short Film:	Danna Hansen Every Night and Twice on Sundays	
The Method Fest Lifetime Achievement Award:	Maximillian Schell	
The Method Fest Indie Supporter Award:	Karen Black	

== 2000 ==
Best Feature:	Stanley's Gig	
John Garfield Award for Best Actor: (tie)	Hill Harper The Visit	
Geraldine Page Award for Best Actress:	Robin Dearden Last Chance	
Festival Director's Breakout Filmmaking Award:	The Young Unknowns; dir. Catherine Jelski	Trash; dir. Mark Anthony Galluzzo
Best Director, Feature Film:	Bryan Cranston Last Chance	
Best Screenplay, Feature Film:	Post-Mortem Louis Belanger	
Maverick Award for Quality in a Low-budget film:	The Stonecutter; dir. Stephen Ericksen	
Audience Award, Feature Film:	The Visit	
Audience Award, Short Film:	Mutual Love Life	
Best Supporting Actor, Feature Film:	Brent Glenen Rollercoaster	
Best Supporting Actress, Feature Film:	Marla Gibbs The Visit	
Best Short Film:	Boundaries; dir. Greg Durbin	
Best Director, Short Film:	J. Miller Tobin 4 AM Open All Night	
Best Actor in a Short Film:	Allen Garfield Men Named Milo Women Named Greta	
Best Actress in a Short Film:	Tippi Hedren Mulligans!	

== 2001 ==
Best Feature:	I'll Wave Back; dir. Jefferson Davis	
Best Short Film	Egg; dir. Jacques Thelemaque	
Best Actress:	Romy Rosemont in I'll Wave Back	
Best Supporting Actor:	Matthew Faber in Hard Luck	
Best Supporting Actress:	Rusty Schwimmer in I'll Wave Back	
Breakout Acting Award:	D.W. Warren in Lansdown	
Maverick Actor Award:	Jon Jacobs in Hard Luck	
Best Director	I'll Wave Back; dir. Jefferson Davis	
Best Screenplay	Finder's Fee; Jeff Probst	
Maverick Film Award: (tie)	Falling Like This; dir. Dani Minnick	Hard Luck; dir. Jack Rubio
Festival Director's Breakout Filmmaking Award (tie)	The Restless	Falling Like This
Festival Director's Award for Excellence in Acting	Kirk Harris (Hard Luck)	Irina Bjorklund (The Restless)
Lifetime Achievement Award	James Earl Jones	

== 2002 ==
Best Feature:	Sunday; dir. Charles McDougall
Best Short Film	5 Minutes; dir. Larry Pennell
Best Actress in a Short:	Falsehood (film) Anne Welles
Best Actress in a Feature:	Walk Backwards Laurie Baranyay
Best Supporting Actress:	Suspended Lin Shaye
Best Director (feature)	Sunday; dir. Charles McDougall
Best Writer/Director	Falsehood (film) Kenneth Lui
Best Student Film	Falsehood (film); dir. Kenneth Lui
Festival Director's Breakout Filmmaking Award (tie)	Killer Me Zachary Hansen
Audience Award	Falsehood (film); dir. Kenneth Lui
Lifetime Achievement Award	Rod Steiger

== 2019 ==
Best Feature:	Chained for Life; dir. Aaron Schimberg	
Best Short Film:	The Critic; dir. Stella Velon	
Best Actress in a Feature:	Tayler Buck in Princess of the Row	
Best Actor in a Feature: (tie)	Ethan Hawke in Stockholm	John Rezaj in Albanian Gangster
Break Out Acting Award in a Feature:	Edi Gathegi in Princess of the Row	
Best Director Feature:	Windows on the World Michael D. Olmos	
Best Supporting Actor in a Feature:	Edward James Olmos in Windows on the World	
Best Supporting Actress in a Feature:	Allison Tolman in Speed of Life	
Best Screenplay Feature:	Windows on the World; Robert Mailer Anderson and Zack Anderson	
Best Actress in a Short:	Kirstin Anderson in S_15	
Best Actor in a Short:	Stéphane Monpetit in Without Saying Goodbye	
Best Director Short:	Mixed Signals Tracie Laymon	
Audience Award Feature:	Princess of the Row; dir. Max Carlson	
Audience Award Short Film:	The Rat; dir. Carlen May-Mann	
Generations of Cinematic Excellence Award:	Edward James Olmos and Michael D. Olmos	
The Festival Director Award for an Outstanding Performance:	Jon Jacobs in Lost Angelas	
Maverick Award for Quality in Low-Budget Feature:	A Room Full of Nothing; dir. Elena Weinberg and Duncan Coe	
Best Ensemble Cast:	Confessional; dir. Brad Gottfred	
Best Foreign Feature:	Sofia; dir. Meryem Benm'Barek-Aloïsi	
