= Marie-Noelle Marquis =

French-Canadian actress (born 1979)

- Born: January 29, 1979 (age 47); Rivière-du-Loup, Quebec, Canada

Marie-Noelle Marquis (born January 29, 1979) is a French-Canadian actress.

== Life ==
At an early age, she started ballet and painting, until she joined a music conservatory high school and studied clarinet for five years. Upon her graduation, she decided to focus on theater. She joined the theater arts program at St-Hyacinthe College near Montreal and completed her college studies at John Abbott College the following year.

After studying theatre in college, she moved to Los Angeles and attended the American Academy of Dramatic Arts, graduating with honors in 1999. While she was still at the academy, she played the lead in the short film "The Kiss".

Since then she has been performing as an actor in film and theater and has worked on a variety of voice-over projects for the French and the American market. She completed her first feature-length screenplay The Letter, which she co-wrote with her mother, French-Canadian writer Helene Carle.

As of 2008, she was a member of Playhouse West-School and repertory theatre.

== Filmography ==
- Eyeball Eddie (2000) - short film
- Falsehood (2001) - short film
- National Lampoon Presents Dorm Daze (2003)
- Masters of Magic (2008) - direct-to-video
- The Empty Room (2009) - short film
