= The Critic (2019 film) =

- Film poster
- Directed by: Stella Velon
- Written by: Stella Velon
- Produced by: Jean Gabriel Kauss; Stella Velon
- Starring: Stella Velon; Alan Smyth; Todd Karner
- Cinematography: Akis Konstantakopoulos
- Edited by: Ivan Andrijanic
- Music by: Asaf Sagiv
- Production company: The Punk Floyd Company
- Distributed by: Amazon Prime Video (US and UK) and Omeleto
- Release date: 3 June 2019
- Running time: 15 minutes
- Country: United States
- Language: English

The Critic is a 2019 American psychological thriller short film written and directed by Stella Velon. It is the story of an award-winning actress who faces her harshest critic during an interview gone wrong. The film stars Stella Velon and Alan Smyth, and explores themes of fame, drug addiction, mental health and impostor syndrome. The Critic had its world premiere at the Boston Film Festival in September 2018 and it was first released on Amazon Prime Video in June 2019 as part of Amazon Studios' inaugural All Voices Film Festival, where it was named one of the five winning films.

In 2020, the film was nominated for a Webby Award out of 13,000 entries worldwide in the Best Individual Performance category.

== Synopsis ==
An award-winning actress with a troubled past, goes for an interview after a major win. The interview takes a wrong turn and proves to be a lot more than just that. The Critic provides a glimpse into the darker side of fame and serves as a social commentary on the value we place on art.

== Cast ==
- Stella Velon as Actress
- Alan Smyth as Interviewer
- Todd Karner as Director

== Reception ==
The Critic received 5-star reviews from UK Film Review and Indie Shorts Mag. The Independent Critic rated it 3.5 out of 4 and Film Threat gave it 8 out of 10 stars, describing Velon’s performance as "excellent and poignant."

One Film Fan, called The Critic, "A quietly fierce, dramatically potent, and heartbreakingly palpable exercise in what could very well be one of the most impactful inward looks at the realities found within the celebrity mindset."

The Independent Critic described the film as "a remarkably poignant story that somehow manages to travel a broad emotional spectrum while delivering a complete story within its modest 15-minute running time."

UK Film Review called the film "a particularly poignant piece of cinema in the current social climate". Indie Shorts Mag elected the film their "Editor's Pick – The Best Of All, From 2018!" in which they wrote, "Of all the films of 2018, the best of it all had to be 'The Critic', for its sheer content and consistency with regards to performance and execution from all quarters."

On the review aggregator website Letterboxd the film holds an average rating of 3.4/5 based on 121 reviews.

== Accolades ==
| Awards/Festivals | Year | Category | Recipients | Result | Reference |
|---|---|---|---|---|---|
| The Webby Awards | 2020 | Best Individual Performance | Stella Velon | Nominated | |
| W3 Awards | 2020 | Best Individual Performance | Stella Velon | Won | |
| Arpa International Film Festival | 2020 | Best Short Film | The Critic | Nominated | |
| Amazon Prime Video’s All Voices Film Festival | 2019 | Runner-up | The Critic | Won | |
| Method Fest Independent Film Festival | 2019 | Best Short Film | The Critic | Won | |
| Method Fest Independent Film Festival | 2019 | Best Actress | Stella Velon | Nominated | |
| London Independent Film Festival | 2019 | Best Short Film | The Critic | Nominated | |
| Queen Palm International Film Festival | 2019 | Annual Grand Jury Prize | The Critic | Won | |
| Queen Palm International Film Festival | 2019 | Annual Best Short Film - First-time Filmmaker | The Critic | Won | |
| Sunscreen Film Festival | 2019 | Best Breakout Short | The Critic | Nominated | |
| UK Film Review Awards | 2018 | Best Director | Stella Velon | Won | |
| Boston Film Festival | 2018 | Best Short Film | The Critic | Nominated | |
