= Chained for Life (2019 film) =

- North American theatrical release poster
- Directed by: Aaron Schimberg
- Written by: Aaron Schimberg
- Produced by: Daniel Patrick Carbone; Vanessa McDonnell; Matthew Petock; Jane Schoenbrun; Zachary Shedd
- Starring: Jess Weixler; Adam Pearson; Stephen Plunkett; Charlie Korsmo; Sari Lennick
- Cinematography: Adam J. Minnick
- Edited by: Sofi Marshall
- Music by: C. Spencer Yeh
- Production companies: Flies Collective; Grand Motel Films; The Eyeslicer
- Distributed by: Kino Lorber
- Release date: September 11, 2019
- Running time: 91 minutes
- Country: United States
- Language: English
- Box office: $17,431

Chained for Life is a 2019 American drama film written and directed by Aaron Schimberg.

== Premise ==
A beautiful actress struggles to connect with her disfigured co-star on the set of a European auteur's English-language debut.

== Cast ==
- Jess Weixler as Mabel
- Adam Pearson as Rosenthal
- Stephen Plunkett as Max
- Charlie Korsmo as Herr Director
- Sari Lennick as Sarah
- Logan Register as Phrosa

== Reception ==
On review aggregator Rotten Tomatoes, Chained for Life holds an approval rating of 100%, based on 52 reviews. Its consensus reads, "Darkly funny and impressively ambitious, Chained for Life is as unpredictable as it is original." On Metacritic, the film has a weighted average score of 79 out of 100, based on 14 critics, indicating "generally favorable" reviews.
