= Stella Velon =

French-American actress and model

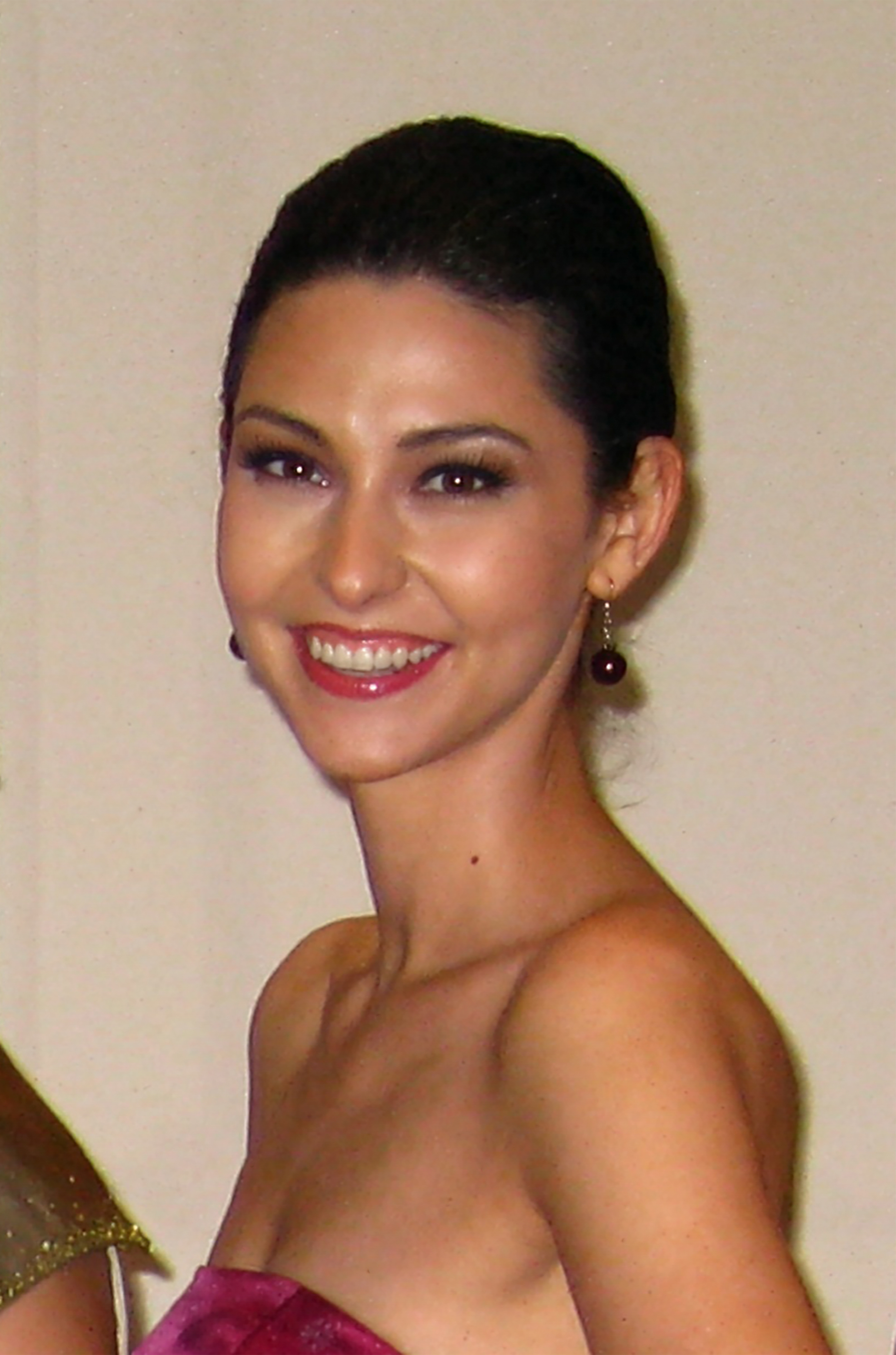
- Education: Paris Nanterre University; HB Studio
- Occupations: actress, writer, director
- Years active: 2005 - present
- Known for: Director of The Critic (2019 film)
- Awards: Full list

Stella Velon is a French-American model and actress. She directed and played in the 2019 film The Critic.

== Education ==
Velon received her bachelor’s degree in economics and business management at Paris Nanterre University. She took acting classes in Paris and Copenhagen, and later at HB Studio in New York. There she started her acting career.

== Career ==
Velon acted as a model and appeared in various advertisements for Calvin Klein, Oribe, Lacoste, and others. She is a brand ambassador for Di Modolo, a jewellery brand. She appeared in the television show Gossip Girl and the movie Men in Black 3 and Shutterbug.

=== The Critic ===
Velon co-founded The Punk Floyd Company along with Jean Gabriel Kauss, former photographer. The company produced The Critic, a psychological thriller short film, where Velon played as one of the two protagonists. The filming took place over two consecutive days at the same film set in Los Angeles, California. The film deals with topics ranging from impostor syndrome, mental health, substance abuse, to artists' and women’s place in Hollywood. She received nomination for the Best Individual Performance category at the 2020 Webby Awards for her role in the film. The received the Best Short Film award at the Method Fest Independent Film Festival, and was the runner-up for the Women in Film Award at the Kinofilm Manchester International Short Film Festival.

== Filmography ==
=== Film and television ===
Key

†	Denotes films that have not yet been released

Title	Year	Actor	Writer	Director	Notes
Vive la vie	2005	Yes	No	No	Feature film (France)
R.I.S. Police scientifique	2006	Yes	No	No	TV series (France)
A Girl and a Gun	2009	Yes	No	No	Shot on film
Shutterbug	2009	Yes	No	No	Feature film
Gossip Girl	2010	Yes	No	No	TV series
Dead End	2010	Yes	No	No	Short film (silent)
Hoppus on Music	2011	Yes	No	No	Promotional
Asylum	2011	Yes	No	No	Short film
Far Rockaway	2011	Yes	No	No	Feature film
Men in Black 3	2012	Yes	No	No	Feature film
Video Game	2013	Yes	No	No	Short film
Sruggleing	2017	Yes	No	No	Web series
Baskets	2016	Yes	No	No	TV series
79 Parts	2016	Yes	No	No	Feature film
Stella	2017	Yes	Yes	No	Short film
The Critic	2019	Yes	Yes	Yes	Short film
Erase & Rewind †	TBA	Yes	Yes	Yes	Feature film based on the short The Critic
Untitled Stella Velon Comedy Series Project †	TBA	Yes	Yes	Yes	TV series

== Music videos ==
Year	Title	Artist	Notes
2011	"Secret Window”	Dusty Wright	Performs “Soleils couchants” by Paul Verlaine at the top

== Awards and nominations ==
Award/Festival	Year	Category	Nominated work	Result
Boston Film Festival	2018	Best Short Film	The Critic	Nominated
Festival Angaelica X Catalyst Content	2019	Best Breakout Performance	The Critic	Won
London Independent Film Festival	2019	Best Short Film	The Critic	Nominated
Amazon Prime Video’s All Voices Film Festival	2019	Runner-up / First Prize recipient	The Critic	Won
Method Fest Independent Film Festival	2019	Best Short Film	The Critic	Won
Method Fest Independent Film Festival	2019	Best Actress	The Critic	Nominated
The Webby Awards	2020	Best Individual Performance	The Critic	Nominated
Arpa International Film Festival	2020	Best Short Film	The Critic	Nominated
