= Café Society (2016 film) =

Film by Woody Allen

- Theatrical release poster
- Directed by: Woody Allen
- Written by: Woody Allen
- Produced by: Letty Aronson; Stephen Tenenbaum; Edward Walson
- Starring: Jeannie Berlin; Steve Carell; Jesse Eisenberg; Blake Lively; Parker Posey; Kristen Stewart; Corey Stoll; Ken Stott
- Cinematography: Vittorio Storaro
- Edited by: Alisa Lepselter
- Production companies: Gravier Productions; Perdido Productions; FilmNation Entertainment
- Distributed by: Amazon Studios; Lionsgate
- Release dates: May 11, 2016 (Cannes); July 15, 2016 (United States)
- Running time: 96 minutes
- Country: United States
- Language: English
- Budget: $30 million
- Box office: $43.8 million

Café Society is a 2016 American romantic comedy drama film written and directed by Woody Allen. It stars Jesse Eisenberg, Kristen Stewart, Steve Carell, Jeannie Berlin, Blake Lively, Parker Posey, Corey Stoll, and Ken Stott. The plot follows a young man who moves to Hollywood in the 1930s, where he falls in love with the assistant to his uncle, a powerful talent agent.

The film had its premiere at the Cannes Film Festival on May 11, 2016, and was theatrically released in the United States on July 15, 2016, by Amazon Studios and Lionsgate. It received generally positive reviews and grossed $43 million. It received nomination at the Golden Eagle Award in 2017 for Best Foreign Language Film.

== Plot ==
Bobby Dorfman is the youngest son of a Jewish family in New York City in the 1930s. His elder sister Evelyn is a married school teacher, while his elder brother Ben is a gangster. Discontented with working for his father, a jeweler, Bobby decides to move to Hollywood, where he takes a job running menial errands for his uncle Phil, a powerhouse talent agent.

Phil introduces Bobby to his secretary Veronica, nicknamed Vonnie, who is tasked with helping Bobby settle into Hollywood. Bobby is drawn to her unpretentiousness as opposed to most young women living in Hollywood, and falls deeply in love with her. She rebuffs his advances, telling him she has a journalist boyfriend named Doug. In reality, "Doug" is Phil, with whom Vonnie is carrying on an illicit romance; he promises to divorce his wife and marry her.

On the first-year "paper anniversary" of their affair, Vonnie gives Phil a letter written and signed by Rudolph Valentino as a gift. However, Phil proceeds to tell her that he is incapable of divorcing his wife, so he ends the affair. Vonnie subsequently surrenders to Bobby's love for her and their friendship turns into a romance.

A forlorn Phil confides in Bobby about his affair—without naming his mistress—before telling him that he is determined to divorce his wife. Bobby passingly mentions his relationship with Vonnie and his intention to marry her and return to New York. Phil begins petitioning Vonnie privately to leave Bobby and marry him instead.

While having a conversation with Phil in his office, Bobby notices the Valentino letter. Recognizing it from Vonnie's account on her breakup with "Doug", he confronts her and asks her to choose between himself and Phil. Vonnie chooses Phil. A heartbroken Bobby returns to New York City where he begins to run a high-end nightclub with his gangster brother, Ben. It soon becomes a famous hangout for the rich and powerful, from politicians to gangsters. Bobby meets divorcée Veronica Hayes at the nightclub, and they begin dating, soon getting married.

On an extended visit to New York, a happily married Phil and Vonnie stop at the nightclub and insist on seeing Bobby. Vonnie has become a pretentious name-dropper and Bobby is at first repulsed by her. However, he agrees to show her around New York—as she had once done for him in Hollywood. They spend an evening without Phil, visiting Bobby's favorite haunts and, as dawn breaks over Central Park, share a kiss; but it is clear that it can go no further.

Bobby's sister Evelyn asks their brother, Ben, to "talk to" her disagreeable neighbor; Ben promptly kills him. He is arrested and convicted of murder and racketeering. Shortly before he goes to the electric chair, he converts to Christianity, mortifying his parents. His late brother's notoriety propels the nightclub to new heights, and Bobby travels to Los Angeles to contemplate opening a Hollywood version. He ultimately decides against it, but before he leaves, he and Vonnie have lunch together, where she mentions that she and Phil will be returning to New York for a short visit. However, they both agree to avoid seeing each other.

Months later, on New Year's Eve, a pregnant Veronica asks Bobby if he has ever cheated on her, saying she had a dream in which he slept with Vonnie while he was in Hollywood, but he denies it. Bobby is in New York City hosting festivities in his nightclub, while Vonnie is with Phil at a Hollywood house party. As the new year is rung in, they both seem distant to their spouses, and both have a faraway look in their eyes.

== Cast ==
- Jesse Eisenberg as Bobby Dorfman
- Kristen Stewart as Veronica "Vonnie" Sybil
- Steve Carell as Phil Stern
- Blake Lively as Veronica Hayes
- Parker Posey as Rad Taylor
- Corey Stoll as Ben Dorfman
- Jeannie Berlin as Rose Dorfman
- Ken Stott as Marty Dorfman
- Anna Camp as Candy
- Paul Schneider as Steve
- Sheryl Lee as Karen Stern
- Tony Sirico as Vito
- Stephen Kunken as Leonard
- Sari Lennick as Evelyn Dorfman
- Laurel Griggs as Evelyn Dorfman's daughter
- Max Adler as Walt
- Don Stark as Sol
- Gregg Binkley as Mike
- Anthony DiMaria as Howard Fox
- Magi Avila (uncredited) as service lady
- Woody Allen (uncredited) as Narrator (voice)

== Production ==
By March 9, 2015, Jesse Eisenberg, Bruce Willis and Kristen Stewart were added to the cast of the Woody Allen film, which was produced by Letty Aronson, Stephen Tenenbaum and Edward Walson. On May 6, 2015, Blake Lively was cast, followed by Parker Posey in mid-July. By August 4, 2015, more cast was added, including Jeannie Berlin, Corey Stoll and Ken Stott, along with Anna Camp, Stephen Kunken, Sari Lennick and Paul Schneider. In August, Tony Sirico was cast and Max Adler had also joined the cast. Vittorio Storaro is the cinematographer.

On August 24, 2015, it was reported that Willis had exited the film due to his scheduling conflicts with Misery, the Broadway stage adaptation of the novel by Stephen King. On August 28, 2015, Steve Carell was cast to replace Willis. In March 2016, the title was confirmed as Café Society.

=== Filming ===
Principal photography on the film began on August 17, 2015, in and around Los Angeles. On September 8, 2015, filming moved to New York City, where it was shot in Brooklyn. Allen moved to digital for the first time, using a Sony CineAlta F65 camera for this, his 47th film.

The film began with a budget of $18 million; however it went over budget, and by the end of production, its budget reached $30 million, making it one of the most expensive films of Allen's career.

== Release ==
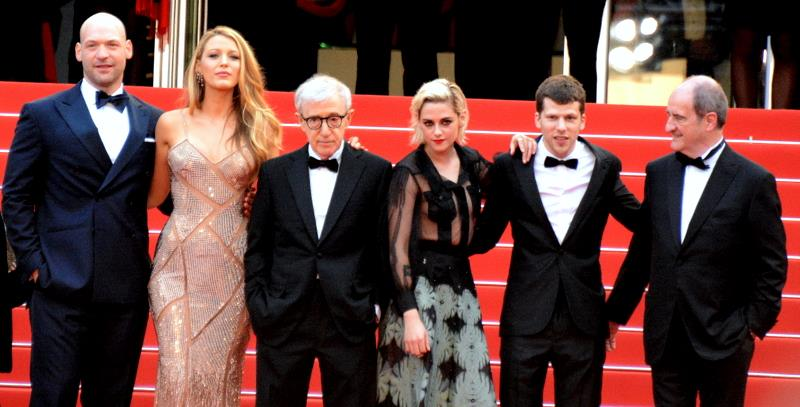
Allen and the cast at the 2016 Cannes Film Festival

In February 2016, Amazon Studios acquired distribution rights to the film. In March 2016, the film was selected to open the 2016 Cannes Film Festival. The film also opened the Seattle International Film Festival, on May 19, 2016, and served as the closing night film of the Karlovy Vary Film Festival. It was announced that Lionsgate would team up with Amazon to release the film on August 12, 2016. It was then moved up to July 15, 2016, in a limited release, before the wide expansion will starting July 29 and the widely release on August 5.

== Reception ==
=== Box office ===
Café Society grossed $11.1 million in the United States and Canada and $32.7 million in other countries, for a worldwide total of $43.8 million.

The film was released in five theaters on July 15, 2016, and grossed $359,289 in its opening weekend, an average per-theater gross of $71,858, the biggest average of 2016 to that point (its record was broken the following week by Don't Think Twice's $92,835 average). The film had its wide release on July 29 and grossed $2.3 million, finishing 12th at the box office.

=== Critical response ===
On Rotten Tomatoes, the film has an approval rating of 71% based on 258 reviews, with an average rating of 6.2/10. The site's critical consensus reads, "Café Society's lovely visuals and charming performances round out a lightweight late-period Allen comedy whose genuine pleasures offset its amiable predictability." On Metacritic, the film has a score of 64 out of 100, based on 37 critics, indicating "generally favorable" reviews.

Writing for New York, David Edelstein gave the film a positive review, stating: "Cafe Society is a surprisingly graceful work. It's a young man's tale of woe rendered with an old man's aversion to dawdling over what can't be helped, over questions of human nature that have long been settled to everyone's dissatisfaction. The worldview is weary, and Allen narrates in a voice that, for the first time, suggests his 80 years of age. But his touch lightens with each film, and the melancholy bubbles up from below and catches you off guard." Owen Gleiberman of Variety gave the film a mixed review, writing, "Café Society leaves you dreaming of the movie it might have been had Woody Allen made it by doing what he's done in his best work: nudging himself out of his comfort zone."

Wendy Ide of The Guardian gave the film three stars out of five, commenting, "From the reassuring chug of Woody Allen's trademark trad jazz score to Jesse Eisenberg's disconcertingly accurate channeling of the director's jittery introspection, this handsome, nostalgia-sodden romance feels rather familiar. But just when you are about to dismiss the picture as pure cappuccino froth, the bittersweet bite kicks in. It's not in the same league as Allen's finest work, but nor is it a honking misfire like Magic in the Moonlight." Todd McCarthy of The Hollywood Reporter added, "Layered with a rich soundtrack of romantic tunes from the period, this is a familiar tale of love yearned for, gained, lost and savored after the fact. In other words, it's a format Allen has relied upon many times before, but even past the age of 80, the still-fertile writer-director, amazingly sticking to his one-film-per-year rhythm (not to mention his upcoming TV series, also with Amazon), has created a small fiction of amiable appeal and vibrancy which goes down as easily as a fizzy cocktail."

== See also ==
- Café society
