= A Different Man =

2024 film by Aaron Schimberg

- Theatrical release poster
- Directed by: Aaron Schimberg
- Written by: Aaron Schimberg
- Produced by: Christine Vachon; Vanessa McDonnell; Gabriel Mayers
- Starring: Sebastian Stan; Renate Reinsve; Adam Pearson
- Cinematography: Wyatt Garfield
- Edited by: Taylor Levy
- Music by: Umberto Smerilli
- Production companies: A24; Killer Films; Grand Motel Films
- Distributed by: A24
- Release dates: January 21, 2024 (Sundance); September 20, 2024 (United States)
- Running time: 112 minutes
- Country: United States
- Language: English
- Box office: $1.5 million

A Different Man is a 2024 American dark comedy psychological thriller film written and directed by Aaron Schimberg, starring Sebastian Stan, Renate Reinsve, and Adam Pearson. The film follows Edward (Stan), an actor with neurofibromatosis who undergoes an experimental procedure to change his face, only for his new life to make past insecurities and new issues apparent.

The film had its world premiere at the Sundance Film Festival on January 21, 2024, and was screened at the 74th Berlin International Film Festival on February 16, where Stan won the Silver Bear for Best Leading Performance. It was theatrically released in the United States on September 20, 2024, by A24. It received positive reviews from critics, who mostly praised the performances of Stan and Pearson, as well as Schimberg's screenplay. The film earned a nomination for Best Makeup and Hairstyling at the 97th Academy Awards, while Stan won Best Actor in a Motion Picture – Musical or Comedy at the 82nd Golden Globe Awards.

== Plot ==
Edward Lemuel is a socially awkward struggling actor with neurofibromatosis that manifests as a disfiguring facial condition. He befriends his new neighbor Ingrid Vold, an aspiring playwright, but is too nervous to act on his romantic feelings towards her. He secretly undergoes an experimental medical treatment to cure him of his condition. Seeing that it has worked, he assumes the identity of "Guy Moratz" and claims that Edward has killed himself, instead of continuing to report to his doctors.

Some time later, "Guy" is now a wealthy and successful real estate agent. One day, he discovers that Ingrid is producing Edward, an off-Broadway play that she has written based on his life. Using an old cast mask of his original face that was given to him by the doctors, he auditions and is cast in the lead role after some initial questioning from Ingrid. Edward and Ingrid begin a sexual relationship soon thereafter, though Ingrid remains unaware of the truth of his identity. During rehearsals, they are visited by Oswald, a man also with neurofibromatosis who has taken an interest in the play. The confident and charismatic Oswald quickly befriends the cast and crew, although Edward is perturbed by his outgoing demeanor. One night, Ingrid asks Edward to wear the mask during sex; he hesitantly obliges until she abruptly laughs it off as "fucked up."

Ingrid and Oswald grow closer, and after Edward is unable to memorize his lines, she decides to recast Oswald in the lead role and make rewrites based on Oswald's feedback. The play is a success, and Oswald's performance receives rave reviews. Edward's mental state begins to deteriorate: he begins stalking Oswald, erratically starts acting like Oswald using the mask, and is fired from his real estate job. He eventually storms the stage of the play one night to physically attack Oswald. During the scuffle, part of the set falls on Edward, breaking his legs and arms. While he recovers from his injuries, he moves back into his former apartment next to Ingrid, who is now living with Oswald and making plans to adapt Edward into a film with Michael Shannon in the title role. One day, after Edward's physical therapist expresses disgust for Oswald, Edward stabs him and is jailed.

Years later, an aged Edward once again encounters Oswald. He has dinner with Oswald and Ingrid, who are planning their retirement to a commune in Canada. They reveal that the Edward film adaptation fell through and the two look back on the play with disdain. A waiter arrives to take their orders, but a visibly nervous Edward struggles to choose from the menu. Oswald jokes that "Edward" has not changed a bit.

== Cast ==
- Sebastian Stan as Edward
- Renate Reinsve as Ingrid
- Adam Pearson as Oswald
- C. Mason Wells as Carl
- Owen Kline as Nick
- Charlie Korsmo as Ron Belcher
- Patrick Wang as a director
- Michael Shannon as himself

== Production ==
A Different Man was announced in June 2022, with Aaron Schimberg set as writer and director. Sebastian Stan, Renate Reinsve, and Adam Pearson were also announced as the leads, with Christine Vachon, Gabriel Mayers and Vanessa McDonnell set as producers.

Principal photography began in July 2022 and shot over 22 days in New York City, primarily in the East Village, the Upper West Side, and parts of Brooklyn.

== Release ==
A Different Man premiered at the Sundance Film Festival on January 21, 2024. It also screened in Competition at the 74th Berlin International Film Festival on February 16, 2024. It also screened at New Directors/New Films Festival on April 3, 2024. It was released in the United States on September 20, 2024, and in the United Kingdom on October 4, 2024. The film has been selected for the MAMI Mumbai Film Festival 2024 under the World Cinema section.

== Reception ==
=== Critical response ===
On the review aggregator website Rotten Tomatoes, 93% of 178 critics' reviews are positive, with an average rating of 7.6/10. The website's consensus reads: "Surreal and unsettling, A Different Man overcomes an occasionally tenuous narrative grasp by virtue of its bold, provocative approach to serious themes." Metacritic, which uses a weighted average, assigned the film a score of 78 out of 100, based on 44 critics, indicating "generally favorable" reviews.

The film was named one of the top 10 independent films of 2024 by the National Board of Review, and ranked 21 on the Sight & Sound Best 50 Movies of 2024.

Filmmakers Karyn Kusama, Greg Kwedar and Lance Oppenheim all cited A Different Man as among their favorite films of 2024, with Kwedar saying "This movie works on you in so many ways. Its humor has a terrifying bite in that it holds a mirror to the pernicious ways that comparison is a plague on our self worth. The performances by Sebastian Stan and Adam Pearson and Renate Reinsve are stunning."

In June 2025, IndieWire ranked the film at number 51 on its list of "The 100 Best Movies of the 2020s (So Far)."

=== Accolades ===
The film was selected in Competition at the 74th Berlin International Film Festival, thus it was nominated to compete for the Golden Bear award.

Award	Date	Category	Recipient	Result	Ref.
Palm Springs International Film Festival	January 4, 2024	Directors to Watch	Aaron Schimberg	Won	
Berlin International Film Festival	February 25, 2024	Golden Bear	Aaron Schimberg	Nominated	
Berlin International Film Festival	February 25, 2024	Silver Bear for Best Leading Performance	Sebastian Stan	Won	
Sitges Film Festival	October 13, 2024	Best Feature Film	A Different Man	Nominated	
Sitges Film Festival	October 13, 2024	Best Screenplay	Aaron Schimberg	Won	
Savannah Film Festival	November 2, 2024	Maverick Award	Sebastian Stan	Won	
Gotham Awards	December 2, 2024	Best Feature	Aaron Schimberg, Gabriel Mayers, Vanessa McDonnell and Christine Vachon	Won	
Gotham Awards	December 2, 2024	Outstanding Supporting Performance	Adam Pearson	Nominated	
National Board of Review	December 4, 2024	Top Ten Independent Films	A Different Man	Won	
Los Angeles Film Critics Association	December 8, 2024	Best Supporting Performance	Adam Pearson	Runner-up (Note: Shared with Clarence Maclin for Sing Sing)	
Chicago Film Critics Association	December 11, 2024	Best Supporting Actor	Adam Pearson	Nominated	
New York Film Critics Online	December 16, 2024	Best Actor	Sebastian Stan	Nominated	
Dublin Film Critics' Circle	December 19, 2024	Best Actor	Sebastian Stan	3rd place	
Florida Film Critics Circle	December 20, 2024	Best Supporting Actor	Adam Pearson	Nominated	
Greater Western New York Film Critics Association	January 4, 2025	Best Original Screenplay	Aaron Schimberg	Nominated	
Greater Western New York Film Critics Association	January 4, 2025	Breakthrough Director	Aaron Schimberg	Nominated	
Golden Globe Awards	January 5, 2025	Best Actor in a Motion Picture – Musical or Comedy	Sebastian Stan	Won	
Portland Critics Association	January 14, 2025	Best Comedy Feature	A Different Man	Won	
Critics' Choice Movie Awards	January 26, 2025	Best Hair and Make-Up	Mike Marino, Sarah Graalman and Aaron Saucier	Nominated	
Casting Society of America	February 12, 2025	Outstanding Achievement in Casting – Feature Studio or Independent (Comedy)	Maribeth Fox and Kimberly Ostroy	Nominated	
Make-Up Artists & Hair Stylists Guild	February 15, 2025	Best Special Make-Up Effects	Mike Marino, David Presto and Crystal Junado	Nominated	
Independent Spirit Awards	February 22, 2025	Best Supporting Performance	Adam Pearson	Nominated	
Independent Spirit Awards	February 22, 2025	Best Screenplay	Aaron Schimberg	Nominated	
Academy Awards	March 2, 2025	Best Makeup and Hairstyling	Mike Marino, David Presto and Crystal Junado	Nominated	
