= John Korsmo =

American politician

John T. Korsmo

Chairman of the Federal Housing Finance Board
- In office 2002–2004
- Nominated by: George W. Bush
- Preceded by: J. Timothy O'Neill

Personal details
- Political party: Republican
- Children: Charlie Korsmo

John T. Korsmo is an American politician who formerly served as the chairman of the Federal Housing Finance Board.

== History ==
Korsmo was Chairman of the North Dakota State Republican Party from 1993 to 1995 and ran as the Republican nominee for North Dakota's at-large congressional district seat in the United States House of Representatives in 1992, but lost the election to Earl Pomeroy by a 57% to 39% margin. In 1996 and 1997, he served as Policy and Legislative Director for Republican North Dakota Governor Ed Schafer. An attorney, real estate title abstracter and title insurance agent, Mr. Korsmo was the founder and president since 1998 of Korsmo Consulting Services, Inc., a healthcare, political and sports marketing consulting firm in Fargo, North Dakota.

== Appointment ==
In 2002, President George W. Bush designated Korsmo to be Chairman of the Federal Housing Finance Board, an independent regulatory agency that regulates the 12 Federal Home Loan Banks, which help supply funds to lenders that finance loans for home mortgages. He was confirmed by the Senate on November 29, 2002. He replaced J. Timothy O'Neill, who has been serving as Chairman since June 18 and remained a director on the Board.

Korsmo resigned from the Finance Board in 2004.

== Investigation and conviction ==
The Banking Committee and the Inspector General were looking into the propriety of Korsmo's participation in a fundraising event for a congressional candidate. Korsmo was listed as the "Special Guest" on the invitation to the fundraiser, and the invitations were sent to the Presidents of the Federal Home Loan Banks that are regulated by the Finance Board.

Following the fundraising event, Sen. Paul Sarbanes, the Chairman of the Senate Banking Committee, questioned Korsmo about his participation in the fundraising event whose invitations were sent to banking officials that he regulated. Sarbanes asked the Inspector general to investigate. The FBI also investigated. In a written response to Senator Sarbanes, Korsmo stated that he did not know how the congressional campaign obtained contact information for the banking officials.

Later, Korsmo admitted that his letter to Chairman Sarbanes was false and that he knew before the fundraising event that his wife, Michelle Korsmo, who was involved in organizing the event, had provided Korsmo's detailed contact information to the banking officials to the campaign. Korsmo also admitted that he lied to Inspector General agents regarding his knowledge that his wife had provided the contact lists to the campaign.

Korsmo entered his plea in Federal Court in Washington, D.C., before Judge Henry H. Kennedy Jr. He pleaded guilty to one count of making false statements to the Senate Banking, Housing and Urban Affairs Committee, which oversees the Finance Board, and the Inspector General for the Finance Board. Korsmo was convicted of a felony in the United States District Court for the District of Columbia, in the case of United States of America v. John T. Korsmo, Case Number CR05-104-01, as follows: 18 USC 1001(a)(2), False and Fictitious Statements, for which he received a sentence of unsupervised probation for a term of 18 months, an assessment of $400 and a fine of $5,000.

== Personal ==
His son is Charlie Korsmo, a law professor at Case Western Reserve University and former child actor.
