= Falsehood (2001 film) =

2001 film by Kenneth Lui

- Web Series poster
- Directed by: Kenneth Lui
- Written by: Kenneth Lui
- Produced by: Lu Cien Hioe
- Starring: Anne Welles, Mark Irvingsen, Marie-Noelle Marquis, Stuart Proffitt
- Cinematography: Ken Glassing
- Edited by: Megan Madzeoff
- Music by: Kenneth Lui
- Production company: Mental Pictures
- Release date: 2001
- Running time: 34 minutes
- Language: English

Falsehood (2001) is a short film written and directed by Kenneth Lui starring Anne Welles, Mark Irvingsen, Marie-Noelle Marquis and Stuart Proffitt. Its style is a highly visual fusion of film noir against classic fairy tale motifs. It is written in the style of a courtroom drama with neo-noir elements.

== Story ==
The film opens on an idyllic pasture where a young Bo Peep awakens from an ill-timed nap to find her sheep missing. After searching for her sheep with no luck, she finds bloody wool remains and believes that The Big Bad Wolf has eaten her flock. Years later, the grown up Bo Peep (Anne Welles) is working as a public defense attorney and confronts her own prejudice when she's assigned to defend The Big Bad Wolf (Mark Irvingsen) in the infamous Red Riding Hood (Marie-Noelle Marquis) rape trial.

In the tradition of fables, the film makes use of the interactions between humans and imaginary characters to explore themes of racial discrimination and hypocrisy set in a dark fairy tale world.

== Cast ==
- Anne Welles as Little Bo Peep
- Mark Irvingsen as The Big Bad Wolf
- Marie-Noelle Marquis as Little Red Riding Hood
- Stuart Proffitt as The Hunter
- Barbara Scolaro as Storybook Hand
- Troy Barron as Bailiff
- Timothy Brennen as The Prosecutor
- Erynn Dana Dalton as Rapunzel
- Allison Ehly as Young Little Bo Peep
- Kim Farris as The Cat
- Zachary Hahn as The Judge
- Adrian Hasenmayer as Reporter
- Nancy Hasenmayer as Grandma
- Cathy King as Cinderella
- Mike Kruzel as Bailiff
- Thomas Mounkes as Bailiff
- Ariadne Shaffer as Snow White Charming

== Festivals and awards ==
(Left to Right) Kenneth Lui, Erynn Dalton, Anne Welles, Mark Irvingsen, Marie-Noelle Marquis, Vanessa Du & Stuart Proffitt at Cannes Film Festival 2002

Worldfest Houston 2001	Platinum Award, Best Experimental Drama
Edgeworks Film Festival 2002	Best of Show, Shorts Category
Method Fest 2002	Best Writer/Director, Best Actress, Best Student Film, Audience Award
Lake Arrowhead Film Festival 2002	
“Fine Cut” on PBS 2002	
“Tight Shorts” UCLA-TV 2002	
International Cinematographers Guild Shortfilm Showcase 2002	Ken Glassing - Emerging Cinematographer Award
Cannes Film Festival 2002	
Orinda Film Festival 2003	
ITVfest 2011	Best Director

== Other Showings ==
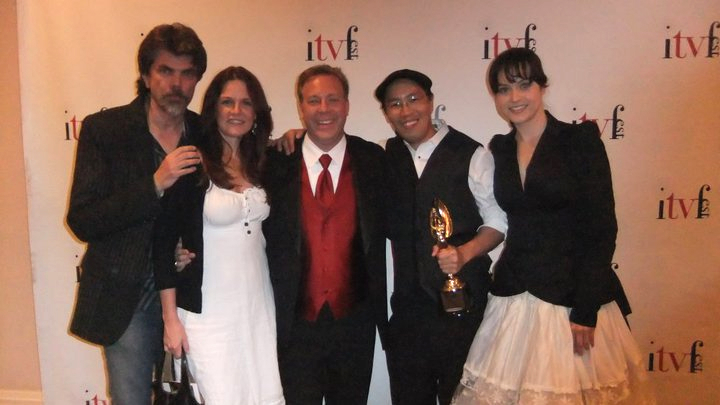
(Left to Right) Mark Irvingsen, Anne Welles, Frank Zanca, Kenneth Lui, Marie-Noelle Marquis

=== KCET Fine Cut ===
On August 16, 2002 the Sixth season of KCETs “Fine Cut – A Festival of Student Film” program aired Falsehood. Before the film began, a warning was issued for adult content, in reference to its coarse language, violence, and sexual content. An interview with writer/director Kenneth Lui was aired after the film.

=== Web series ===
In 2011, Falsehood was re-released as a web series on StayTunedTV and blip.tv. As a web series, Falsehood was nominated by StayTunedTV for five awards: Best Drama, Best Actor in a Drama (Mark Irvingsen), Best Actress in a Drama (Anne Welles), Best Director (Kenneth Lui), and Best Writer (Kenneth Lui). It was awarded the Best Director award at the StayTunedTV/ITVFest Awards 2011.
