= Sari Lennick =

American actress (born 1975)

Sari (Wagner) Lennick (born August 4, 1975) is an American actress. She is known for her film roles as Judith Gopnik in the Coen Brothers' movie A Serious Man (2010 Best Picture Oscar nominee and Robert Altman Independent Spirit Award winner) and Evelyn in Woody Allen's Café Society, which opened the 2016 Cannes Film Festival and was theatrically released in the U.S. on July 15, 2016.

== Biography ==
Sari Lennick was born and raised in Miami, Florida. She graduated from the University of Southern California with a bachelor's degree majoring in theatre and philosophy. Following USC, she moved to New York City and earned a Master of Fine Arts in Acting from the Actors Studio Drama School at New School University.

She currently resides in Los Angeles and is married to financial services executive Alan T. Lennick. They have a son, Dylan, born in August 2007.
