= Aaron Schimberg =

American filmmaker

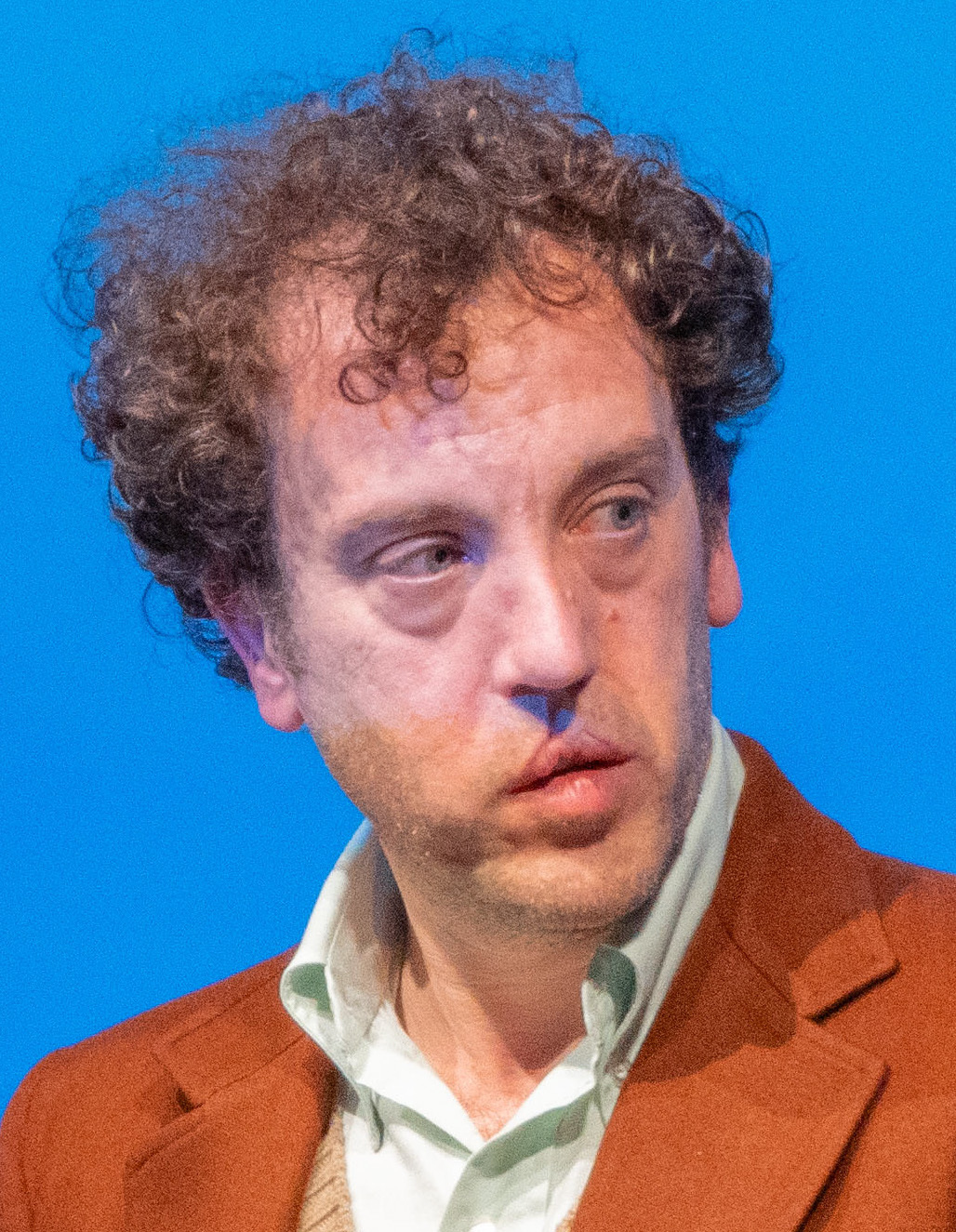
- Schimberg in 2024
- Born: Chicago, Illinois, U.S.
- Occupation: Filmmaker
- Years active: 2013–Present

Aaron Schimberg is an American filmmaker best known for the 2019 film Chained for Life and the 2024 film A Different Man.

== Career ==
Schimberg's debut feature, Go Down Death, was the closing film of the 2013 Fantasia Film Festival. His next film, Chained for Life, premiered at the 2018 BAMcinemaFest and was released theatrically by Kino Lorber the following year.

Schimberg's third feature A Different Man, starring Sebastian Stan and Adam Pearson and distributed by A24, premiered at the 2024 Sundance Film Festival. It was nominated for the Academy Award for Best Makeup and Hairstyling at the 97th Academy Awards. He was named one of the top ten new directors to watch by Variety at that year's Palm Springs International Film Festival.

== Personal life ==
Schimberg was born in Chicago and grew up in Minneapolis. He was born with a bilateral cleft lip and palate and cites it as the reason he gravitates toward narratives about facial disfigurement and disability.

Schimberg is married to Vanessa McDonnell, who is a producer on all of his films.

== Filmography ==
| Year | Title | Ref. |
|---|---|---|
| 2013 | Go Down Death | |
| 2018 | Chained for Life | |
| 2024 | A Different Man | |

Television

| Year | Title | Notes | Ref. |
|---|---|---|---|
| 2025 | The Chair Company | 3 episodes | |

== Awards and nominations ==
| Year | Award | Category | Nominated work | Result | Ref. |
|---|---|---|---|---|---|
| 2019 | Florida Film Festival | Grand Jury Award for Best Narrative Feature | Chained for Life | Won | |
| 2019 | New Hampshire Film Festival | Grand Jury Award for Best Narrative Feature | Chained for Life | Won | |
| 2019 | Knoxville Film Festival | Best Narrative Feature Film | Chained for Life | Won | |
| 2019 | New Orleans Film Festival | Best Narrative Feature | Chained for Life | Won | |
| 2019 | Champs-Élysées Film Festival | Best American Feature Film | Chained for Life | Nominated | |
| 2019 | Method Fest Independent Film Festival | Best Director Feature Film | Chained for Life | Nominated | |
| 2019 | Method Fest Independent Film Festival | Best Feature Film | Chained for Life | Won | |
| 2024 | Berlin International Film Festival | Golden Bear | A Different Man | Nominated | |
| 2024 | Sitges Film Festival | Best Screenplay | A Different Man | Won | |
| 2024 | Gotham Awards | Best Feature | A Different Man | Won | |
| 2024 | Independent Spirit Awards | Best Screenplay | A Different Man | Nominated | |
| 2024 | Palm Springs International Film Festival | Top 10 Directors to Watch | A Different Man | Won (Note: Recognized alongside Blitz Bazawule, Ilker Çatak, Sophie Dupuis, Cord Jefferson, Titus Kaphar, Anna Kendrick, Kobi Libii, Ena Sendijarevic, and Eva Trobisch.) | |
