= Charlie Korsmo =

American lawyer and actor (born 1978)

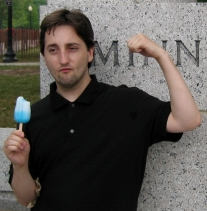
- Korsmo in 2007
- Born: Charles Randolph Korsmo; July 20, 1978 (age 48); Fargo, North Dakota, U.S.
- Education: Massachusetts Institute of Technology (BS); Yale University (JD)
- Occupations: Lawyer; law professor; actor
- Years active: 1988–1998; 2019–present
- Political party: Republican
- Spouse: Adrienne
- Children: 2
- Father: John Korsmo

Charles Randolph Korsmo (born July 20, 1978) is an American lawyer, academic, and actor. He first came to prominence as a child actor, portraying the Kid in the film adaptation of Dick Tracy (1990), Sigmund "Siggy" Marvin in What About Bob? (1991), and Jack Banning in Hook (1991). After earning degrees from the Massachusetts Institute of Technology and Yale Law School, he became a lawyer for the Environmental Protection Agency and worked as a visiting professor at Brooklyn Law School. He is currently a professor of corporate law and finance at Case Western Reserve University School of Law. He still performs as an actor periodically, with roles in films including Can't Hardly Wait (1998, William Lichter), Chained for Life (2019, Herr Director), and A Different Man (2024, Ron Belcher).

== Early life ==
Korsmo was born in Fargo, North Dakota, the son of Deborah Ruf, an educational psychologist, and John Korsmo, former owner of Cass County Abstract and former chairman of the Federal Housing Finance Board. He was raised in the Minneapolis suburb of Golden Valley, where he attended and graduated from Breck School in 1996. He has one older brother and one younger brother.

== Acting career ==
Korsmo's acting roles included The Kid/Dick Tracy Jr. in Dick Tracy; Siggy, the son of Richard Dreyfuss's character, in What About Bob?, and Jack Banning, the son of Peter Pan in the 1991 film Hook. He quit acting in 1991, and did not appear in another film until he portrayed the supporting character William Lichter in the 1998 film Can't Hardly Wait, which he filmed while he was attending MIT. He then took a 20-year break from acting before returning to the screen with a role in the 2019 film Chained for Life.

== Post-acting career ==
Korsmo earned a degree in physics from the Massachusetts Institute of Technology in 2000. He has worked for the Environmental Protection Agency, and for the Republican Party in the House of Representatives. He received his Juris Doctor degree from Yale Law School in 2006.

At Yale, he was a member of the Federalist Society, an organization for conservative and libertarian lawyers and law students. In January 2006, he and other Yale Law students signed an open letter to Pennsylvania Senator Arlen Specter supporting the nomination of Samuel Alito to the Supreme Court. In July 2007, Korsmo passed the New York State Bar exam. Formerly an associate in the New York office of Sullivan & Cromwell LLP and a visiting professor at Brooklyn Law School, Korsmo is a professor of corporate law and corporate finance at the Case Western Reserve University School of Law in Cleveland.

In May 2011, it was announced that Korsmo had been nominated by President Barack Obama as a member of the Board of Trustees of the Barry Goldwater Scholarship and Excellence in Education Foundation.

== Personal life ==
Korsmo is married to Adrienne, with whom he has a daughter and a son.

== Filmography ==
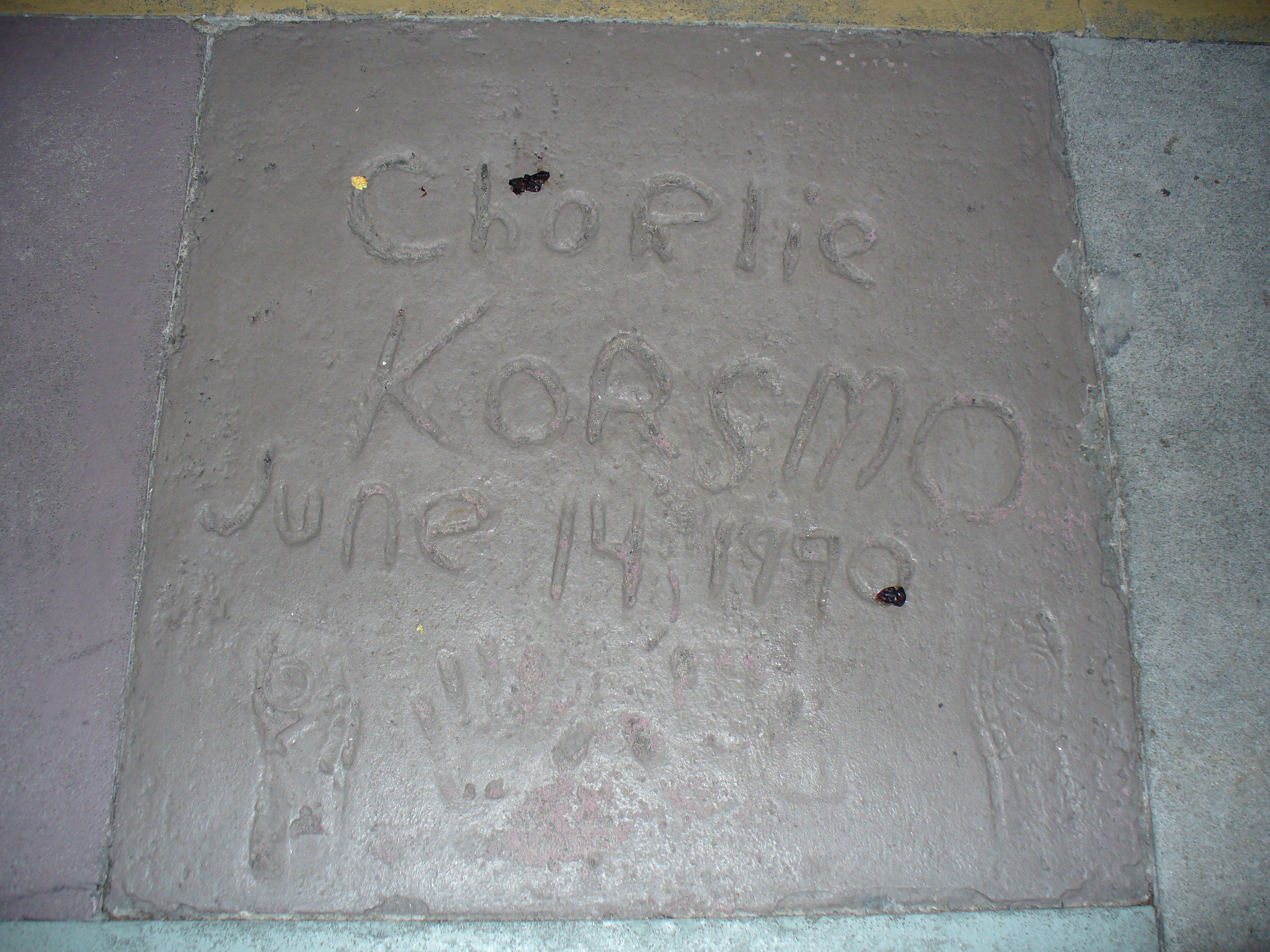
The handprints of Charlie Korsmo in front of The Great Movie Ride at Walt Disney World's Disney's Hollywood Studios theme park

| Year | Title | Role | Notes |
|---|---|---|---|
| 1990 | Men Don't Leave | Matt Macauley | Filmed in 1988 |
| 1990 | Dick Tracy | Kid | Nominated – Saturn Award for Best Performance by a Younger Actor; Nominated – Young Artist Award for Best Young Actor Starring in a Motion Picture |
| 1990 | Heat Wave | 12-Year-Old Jason | |
| 1991 | What About Bob? | Sigmund "Siggy" Marvin | |
| 1991 | The Doctor | Nicky MacKee | |
| 1991 | Hook | Jack Banning | Young Artist Award for Outstanding Young Ensemble Cast in a Motion Picture; Nominated – Chicago Film Critics Association Award for Most Promising Actor; Nominated – Young Artist Award for Best Young Actor Co-starring in a Motion Picture |
| 1998 | Can't Hardly Wait | William Lichter | |
| 2019 | Chained for Life | Herr Director | |
| 2024 | A Different Man | Ron Belcher | |
