= List of Liar Game chapters =

Written by Shinobu Kaitani, the Liar Game manga was published by Shueisha in the Weekly Young Jump magazine, starting in September 2005. In September 2010, after the release of Volume 13, the manga underwent a hiatus for 1.5 years, before resuming once again. However, in February 2013, the manga went into another hiatus briefly once more, before resuming towards its conclusion in January 2015.

== Volumes ==
No.	Release date	ISBN
01	September 16, 2005	978-4-08-876855-7
001. "The Legendary Swindler" (伝説の詐欺師, Densetsu no Sagishi); 002. "Flaw" (欠陥, Kekkan); 003. "Declaration of War" (宣戦布告, Sensen Fukoku); 004. "Intimidating the Enemy" (ゆさぶり, Yusaburi); 005. "Dissonance" (不協和, Fukyōwa); 006. "Game Over"; 007. "Game II"
Nao Kanzaki, a young woman honest to a fault, receives a package containing 100 million yen and is forced to participate in the first round of the elusive "Liar Game", where she must protect the sum she received for a period of one month with the risk of suffering a large debt if she fails. However, she is tricked by her opponent who manages to steal the entire money from her. With the help of Shinichi Akiyama, a famous swindler who recently was released from jail, she manages to get the money back, but by showing mercy to the same man who deceived her, she is forced to participate in the next round of the Liar Game.
02	January 19, 2006	978-4-08-877024-6
008. "Commence Battle" (開戦, Kaisen); 009. "Impatience" (焦燥, Shōsō); 010. "Hope" (光明, Kōmyō); 011. "Alliance"; 012. "Catastrophy"; 013. "Light vs Dark"; 014. "Scheme"; 015. "Upper Hand"; 016. "Foresight"; 017. "Trap"
Forced to keep participating in the Liar Game, Nao and the other contestants of the second round are reunited into a mansion to take part into the tricky "minority game", where each round a question with two options is presented, and those who voted with the majority are eliminated. Nao is relieved to know that Akiyama exchanged places with a contestant to infiltrate the game and help her, but they must also be careful with a mysterious player who also did the same trick with the intention to win the entire prize money for his/herself.
03	October 19, 2006	978-4-08-877151-9
018. "Revival Round"; 019. "Downsizing Game"; 020. "Incitement"; 021. "Scapegoat"; 022. "Battle Plan"; 023. "Light vs Dark"; 024. "Retribution"; 025. "Comeback"; 026. "Control"; 027. "Inflation"; 028. "Salvation"
Despite being relieved from the Liar Game thanks to Akiyama, Nao decides to participate in the Revival Round where losers from the second round are given another chance to continue in the game. In a game called "Downsizing" where all players must cast votes on other ones and the least voted one is eliminated, she is put in a dire situation when she is tricked by Yuji Fukunaga, the same dangerous player they faced in the second round and she must count with Akiyama's help to escape his trap.
04	May 18, 2007	978-4-08-877273-8
029. "Game III"; 030. "Contraband"; 031. "Head Start"; 032. "Chicken"; 033. "Yokoya"; 034. "Clairvoyance"; 035. "Confrontation"; 036. "Division"; 037. "Discovered"; 038. "Confession"
Nao, Akiyama and the seven remaining players from the revival round must participate in the third round as a team in a game entitled "Contraband" where the team who manages to smuggle more money through the other team's vigilance wins. But the opposing team is commanded by the mysterious Norihiko Yokoya who claims to have Clairvoyance powers, and easily obtain a headstart upon them.
05	September 19, 2007	978-4-08-877328-5
039. "Recollection"; 040. "Counterattack"; 041. "Unrest"; 042. "Experiment"; 043. "Strategy"; 044. "Miscalculation"; 045. "Pressure"; 046. "Confusion"; 047. "Reign"; 048. "Preparation"; 049. "Tip-Off"
Akiyama devises a scheme to turn the tables against Yokoya but the team is put into serious danger when he uses the same strategy on them first. Running out of time, he decides to use Yokoya's tyrannical rule over his teammates against him by convincing some of them to join his side in a last try to make a comeback.
06	December 19, 2007	978-4-08-877369-8
050. "Interrogation"; 051. "Confession"; 052. "Scheme"; 053. "Caution"; 054. "Completion"; 055. "Disturbance"; 056. "Blunder"; 057. "Solidarity"; 058. "Discrepancy"; 059. "Provocation"
Yokoya manages to see through Akiyama's plan to secure their team's victory, or so he thought as the results are announced and he finds that he fell into their trap. Nao, Akiyama and Fukunaga decide to continue the game, determined to free all other players, but when Yokoya is about to retire from the game, ruining various players in the process, Nao confronts him and convinces him to keep playing.
07	September 19, 2008	978-4-08-877509-8
060. "No Way Out"; 061. "Simulation"; 062. "Reload"; 063. "Shoot"; 064. "Pitfall"; 065. "Insight"; 066. "Avarice"; 067. "Agitation"; 068. "Centerfield"; 069. "Natural Talent"; 070. "Enticement"
Having technically lost the third round, Nao, Akiyama and Fukunaga take part in a series of one on one matches against another trio in another revival round in order to advance to the fourth round. In the first match, a harmless variation of the "Russian roulette", Nao convinces Fukunaga to force a draw in order to ensure that the game would be extended to the third match. But Akiyama's opponent in the second match, a game of poker with different rules, may be more than he could handle. To complicate matters, Nao realizes that the real opponent in this round are not the opposite team, but the LGT itself.
08	January 19, 2009	978-4-08-877581-4
071. "Divine Sight"; 072. "Counterattack"; 073. "Intuition"; 074. "Request"; 075. "Luck"; 076. "Ruse"; 077. "General"; 078. "Coercion"; 079. "Falter"; 080. "Secret Maneuver"; 081. "Distrust"; 082. "Surrender"; 083. "Ambition"
Akiyama manages to see through his opponent's plan and wins the second round. In the third match, a game called the "stationary roulette" where one player must guess which number the other chose. Nao tries to convince her opponent to cooperate with her in order to save their team, but she refuses. With no other choice, Nao carries out a plan she personally devised with Fukunaga to force their team's victory, and her opponent falls for the trap completely. With their victory assured, Nao and co. sink further into debt by paying for their opponents' freedom, but advance to the fourth round where Yokoya is eagerly waiting to have his revenge against them.
09	August 19, 2009	978-4-08-877703-0
084. "Game IV"; 085. "Pandemic"; 086. "Agree"; 087. "Virus Outbreak"; 088. "Confirmation"; 089. "Conspire"; 090. "Stalemate"; 091. "Doubt"; 092. "Anxiety"; 093. "Differentiate"; 094. "Setup"
Akiyama and Nao arrive at the site of the fourth round just to find that the competitors are split into two groups whose members must compete among themselves in a preliminary round first, and to complicate matters, they must face Yokoya without Fukunaga's help. In the game called "Pandemic" where "normal" players must make contact with other normal players in order to produce vaccines to protect them from "infected" ones, Both Nao and Akiyama try their best to obtain cooperation from the other players, but their efforts so far are being countered by Yokoya's schemes to manipulate them.
10	November 4, 2009	978-4-08-877769-6
095. "Overturn"; 096. "Split"; 097. "Trust"; 098. "Selflessness"; 099. "Check"; 100. "Lookout"; 101. "Bribery"; 102. "Closure"; 103. "Contest"; 104. "Musical Chairs"; 105. "Strategy"
Yokoya plans to take revenge at Akiyama by having Nao as the only eliminated player in the preliminary round, but once again his efforts to obtain victory by corrupting the other players are thwarted by the duo and he is forced to cooperate with them. Qualified for the fourth round, a modified version of the "Musical Chairs" game, Nao and Akiyama find that Fukunaga is among the players who failed to qualify, and the only advice she can give to them is that one of their opponents is an old man who can pose as a threat even more serious than Yokoya himself.
11	February 19, 2010	978-4-08-877805-1
106. "Deception"; 107. "Maneuver"; 108. "Friendship"; 109. "Medals"; 110. "Foundation"; 111. "Bonds"; 112. "Union"; 113. "Recapture"; 114. "Surprise Attack"; 115. "Abstaining"; 116. "Cause"
The fourth round begins and it does not take long to become a three-sided battle between Akiyama, Yokoya and cult leader Takashi Harimoto's groups. Yokoya and Harimoto make a temporary alliance in order to have Akiyama's team defeated first. However, Akiyama manages to have most of the defeated players under his influence and they start fighting each other instead.
12	May 19, 2010	978-4-08-877851-8
117. "Breach"; 118. "Ambush"; 119. "Alliance"; 120. "Puppeteer"; 121. "Dummy"; 122. "Logical Reasoning"; 123. "Turn Around"; 124. "Chance"; 125. "Demons"; 126. "Heartless"
Akiyama's team manages to take control of the game until Yokoya and Harimoto start working together once more. The situation becomes even more critical when one of their allies fails to gain control of the group by intimidation and betrays them, joining Yokoya's side. While his companions believe this sudden development can bring their defeat, Akiyama claims it is the opportunity he waited for to draw a comeback.
13	September 17, 2010	978-4-08-879026-8
127. "Betrayal"; 128. "Prediction"; 129. "Rift"; 130. "Negotiations"; 131. "Make & Break"; 132. "Trickster"; 133. "Under Control"; 134. "Counterattack"; 135. "Shorn"; 136. "Overwhelming"; 137. "Unity"; 138. "Conclusion"
The fourth round becomes a heated battle of wits between the three factions as it draws to its conclusion. Just when Yokoya believed his victory to be assured, Akiyama once again proves himself to be one step ahead of him, and his team emerge victorious in the end. However, Akiyama, Nao and their friends' struggle against Harimoto and Yokoya is set to continue in the next round of the Liar Game.
14	February 24, 2012	978-4-08-879224-8
139. "Resolve"; 140. "A White Lie"; 141. "Bid Poker"; 142. "Growth"; 143. "Unexpected"; 144. "Start"; 145. "Bad Omen"; 146. "Foolhardiness"; 147. "Mysterious Power"; 148. "Blasphemy"
Despite having finally cleared all their debts, both Nao and Akiyama refuse to leave the Liar Game for personal reasons. In the following consolation match, Yokoya declares that he has figured the true colors of the game and to convince the others of it, he accurately deduces that it is a game of bid poker, although with some modified rules. Nao attempts to have the players cooperate for everyone's sake as usual but Harimoto and his followers make plans to thwart her efforts until Akiyama makes his move to stop them.
15	March 16, 2012	978-4-08-879475-4
149. "Insight"; 150. "Cornering the Enemy"; 151. "Collapse"; 152. "Prologue"; 153. "Faith"; 154. "As One"; 155. "Falsehood"; 156. "Multi-layered"; 157. "Strategist"; 158. "Reversal"
Despite succeeding to expose Harimoto's lies, Akiyama fails to prevent the compromise between the players from falling out and the game goes out of control. However, both Nao and Akiyama realize that Harimoto is not the true leader of their group, but Kei Kimura, one of his supposed followers instead and make plans to take advantage of it, but the situation gets even more tense when one of the players, claiming that he was betrayed by the pair, starts selling information to Kimura, who uses his services to increase their profits, seeking to achieve an overwhelming victory.
16	May 17, 2013	978-4-08-879547-8
159. "Resignation"; 160. "Iron-tight"; 161. "Underground"; 162. "Shutout"; 163. "In the Lead"; 164. "Overrun"; 165. "Destruction"; 166. "Will"; 167. "Flipside"; 168. "Catharsis"; 169. "Hope"
Just like in previous rounds, Nao and Akiyama bring down Kimura's strategy by having the remaining players cooperate with them and win. In the occasion, Harimoto reforms and decides to forfeit, using the money he and his team earned to clear a part of other players debts. However, Yokoya defeats Fukunaga in their match and renders her eliminated from the game and with a huge debt to pay. Despite being once again freed from all her debts, Nao decides to return to the game once again to help her friend, but is shocked upon knowing that just as Yokoya predicts, the fifth round of the Liar Game will be the last.
17	September 20, 2014	978-4-08-890013-1
170. "Convening"; 171. "Screams"; 172. "Auction"; 173. "Empire"; 174. "Winning Bid"; 175. "Competition"; 176. "Hostility"; 177. "Novel"; 178. "Backfire"; 179. "Convergence"
The nineteen remaining players must be arranged in teams of four to compete in the fifth and final round of the Liar Game, and a game of "human auction" begins to decide not only the line up of each team, but the three leftover players that will be eliminated right off the bat (after a brief Amidakuji). Once again, Nao and Akiyama work together to make sure that the three eliminated players are exactly those with money enough to resign the game with no problems, but in the occasion, Nao is forced to join Yokoya's team and will be Akiyama's opponent for the main battle.
18	December 19, 2014	978-4-08-890062-9
180. "Double-Edged Blade"; 181. "Rampaging Truth"; 182. "Entrusted Feelings"; 183. "Bad Feeling"; 184. "The Records of the Four Kingdoms Game"; 185. "Offense and Defense"; 186. "Simple Reality"; 187. "Inquiry"; 188. "Declaration of War"; 189. "Trade Secret"; 190. "Bait and Probabilities"
The final round of the Liar Game begins and Akiyama's team get themselves in a serious disadvantage when Yokoya puts the other two teams against them, as part of his plan to destroy not only Akiyama, but Nao as well, by allowing his own team to lose.
19	April 17, 2015	978-4-08-890144-2
191. "Disbalance"; 192. "Wei and Wo"; 193. "Trap"; 194. "Last Choice"; 195. "Danger Zone"; 196. "According to Plan"; 197. "The Only Loophole"; 198. "Stasis"; 199. "Impression"; 200. "Move of Trust"; 201 "Traitor"; 202 "Norihiko Yokoya"; 203. "Liar Game"; Note: Chapter 203 originally came out as Chapter 201, as the 2 previous chapters were added as a bonus in this volume.
Yokoya's strategy works and both Nao and Akiyama are disqualified from the final round. However, he later realizes that he fell into another of Akiyama's schemes, which put the remaining contestants into a loophole and the game ends with no winners nor losers. Afterwards, the executives reveal the true objective of the Liar Game and asks the remaining contestants to cooperate with their plan.
20	October 19, 2026	978-4-08-894360-2
