= Adam Pearson (actor) =

British actor and TV presenter (born 1985)

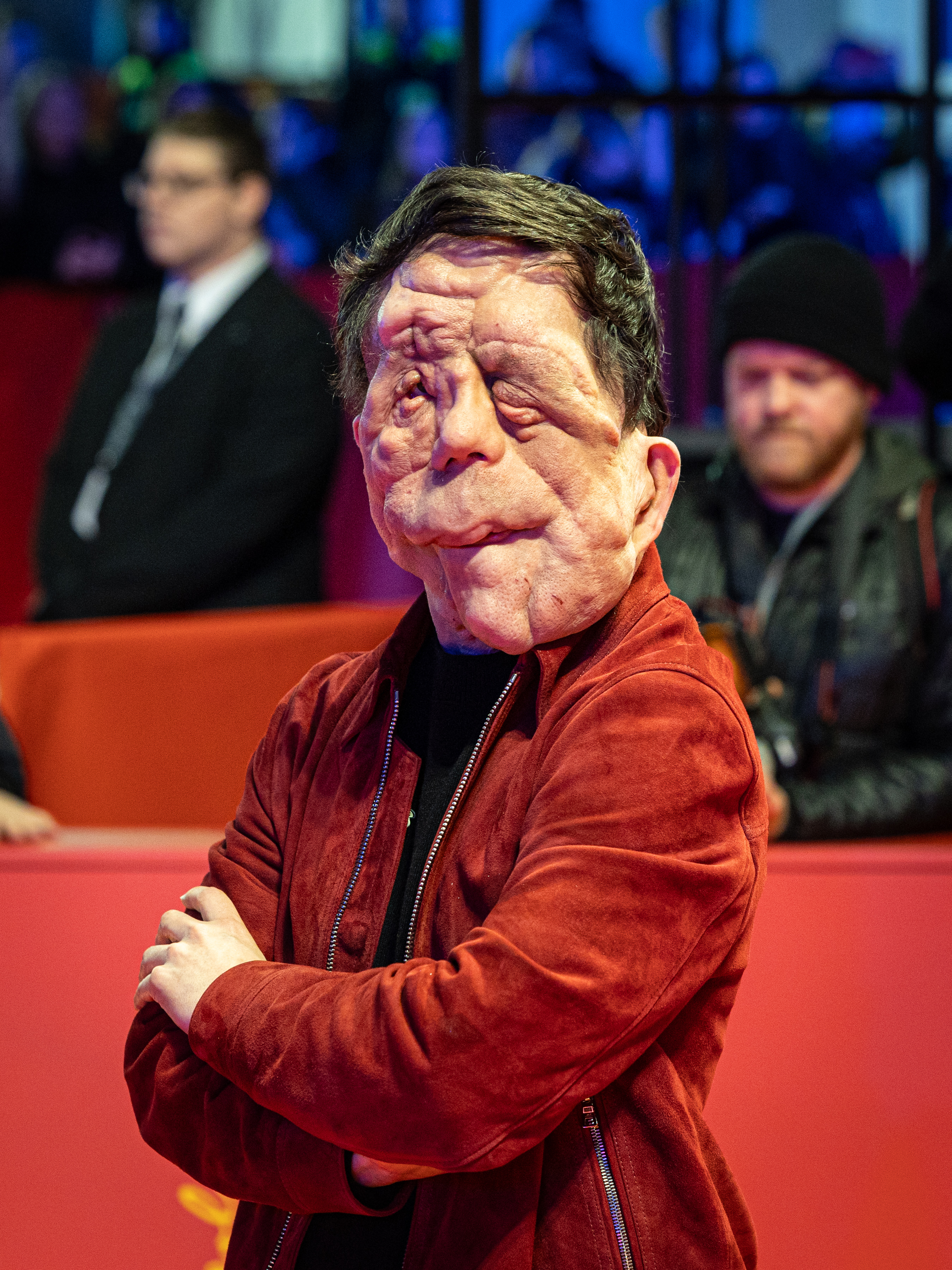
- Adam Pearson at the Berlinale 2024
- Born: 6 January 1985 (age 41); Croydon, London, England
- Education: Brighton University
- Occupations: Actor; television presenter; campaigner
- Years active: 2013–present
- Website: adam-pearson.com

Adam Pearson (born 6 January 1985) is a British actor, television presenter and campaigner. He made his acting debut in the 2013 film Under the Skin. He has neurofibromatosis and has been involved in outreach programmes to combat bullying associated with visible differences. In 2024, Pearson's starring performance in the film A Different Man received wide critical acclaim, and he was nominated for awards including the Independent Spirit Award.

== Early life ==
Pearson was born in Croydon, London, on 6 January 1985, along with his identical twin brother, Neil. After he hit his head at the age of five, the resultant bump persisted instead of healing. He was diagnosed with neurofibromatosis type I, which causes non-cancerous tumours to grow on nerve tissue. Both Adam and his brother Neil have the condition, which manifests in them differently.

== Career ==
=== Presenting ===
The trailer for the Horizon episode "My Amazing Twin", in which Adam starred with his twin brother Neil

Pearson graduated from the University of Brighton with a degree in Business Management. He had various jobs in television production for the BBC and Channel 4 including the shows The Undateables and Beauty and the Beast. He worked as a researcher for the BBC and Channel 4 before becoming a strand presenter on the first series of Beauty and the Beast: The Ugly Face of Prejudice in 2015 on Channel 4. Pearson stated that he had faced violent confrontation because of his appearance. He was on the development team of Beauty and the Beast and consulted on the Dutch version of the series.

Pearson has worked on all five series of The Undateables for Channel 4 as the casting researcher. He has presented the BBC Three documentaries Adam Pearson: Freak Show and The Ugly Face of Disability Hate Crime, and appeared as a reporter in the Channel 4 series Tricks of the Restaurant Trade. He co-hosted the BBC Four documentary Eugenics: Science's Greatest Scandal with Angela Saini in 2019.

Pearson is a regular caller and occasional guest host to The Bedtime Babble On, a radio programme that airs on Spark Sunderland, weeknights from 9pm. Pearson was nominated as UK Documentary Presenter of the Year at the 2016 Grierson Awards. In August 2022, Pearson appeared on Celebrity MasterChef, becoming the first contestant to be eliminated. That year, he also appeared in Celebrity Antiques Road Trip. In 2024, he was the Brighton team captain on Christmas University Challenge.

=== Acting ===
In 2013, Pearson was cast alongside Scarlett Johansson in Jonathan Glazer's film Under the Skin. He said that he hoped the role would challenge disfigurement stigma. It was in this film that Pearson discovered his enjoyment of acting.

In 2019, Pearson starred in the film Chained for Life (directed by Aaron Schimberg). In 2024, Pearson played a leading role in Schimberg's next movie, A Different Man, alongside Sebastian Stan and Renate Reinsve. The film premiered at the 2024 Sundance Film Festival on 21 January 2024, and was screened in Competition at the 74th Berlin International Film Festival on 16 February 2024. Pearson said of the film, "In order to challenge stereotypes, they first need to establish they exist".

In May 2025, Pearson was announced to be starring as Joseph Merrick in an upcoming film adaptation of Bernard Pomerance's play The Elephant Man. Pearson will be the first disabled actor to play this role in a film. The following month, Pearson was invited to become a member of The Academy of Motion Picture Arts and Sciences.

== Charity work ==
In 2024 Pearson became a patron of Face Equality International, an alliance of Non-Governmental Organisations (NGOs), charities and support groups which are working at national, regional or international levels to promote the campaign for ‘face equality’. Pearson is an ambassador for Changing Faces, having first become involved with them as a child.

== Personal life ==
Pearson lives in the Addiscombe area of South London. He is a Christian, and in a 2020 episode of Sunday Morning Live spoke to Sally Phillips about reconciling his faith with his disability, remarking: "A life without hardship is a life without faith; how can you practise your faith if you aren't walking through the fire?"

== Filmography ==
Acting roles

Year	Title	Role	Notes
2013	Under the Skin	The Deformed Man	
2015	Oddity	Andrew Galveston	Short film
2015	Rodentia	Hermes	Short film
2017	DRIB	Himself	
2019	Chained for Life	Rosenthal	
2022	Ruby Splinter	Adam	
2024	A Different Man	Oswald	

Presenting

Year	Title	Notes
2015	The Ugly Face of Disability Hate Crime	BBC Three
2015–2018	Tricks of the Restaurant Trade	Channel 4
2016	Adam Pearson: Freak Show	BBC Three
2019	Eugenics: Science's Greatest Scandal	BBC Four

Television appearances

Year	Title	Channel	Notes
2016	Horizon: "My Amazing Twin"	BBC Two	Self
2017	Celebrity Eggheads	BBC Two	Contestant
2018	Pointless Celebrities	BBC One	Contestant
2019	Celebrity Mastermind	BBC One	Self
2022	Celebrity Masterchef	BBC One	Contestant
2022	Celebrity Antiques Road Trip	BBC One	Self
2024	Christmas University Challenge	BBC Two	Team captain

== Awards and nominations ==
Year	Awards	Category	Nominated work	Result	Ref.
2024	Gotham Awards	Outstanding Supporting Performance	A Different Man	Nominated	
2024	Los Angeles Film Critics Association	Best Supporting Performance	A Different Man	Runner-up (Note: Shared with Clarence Maclin for Sing Sing)	
2024	Chicago Film Critics Association	Best Supporting Actor	A Different Man	Nominated	
2024	Florida Film Critics Circle	Best Supporting Actor	A Different Man	Nominated	
2025	Independent Spirit Awards	Best Supporting Performance	A Different Man	Nominated	
