= List of accolades received by Call Me by Your Name =

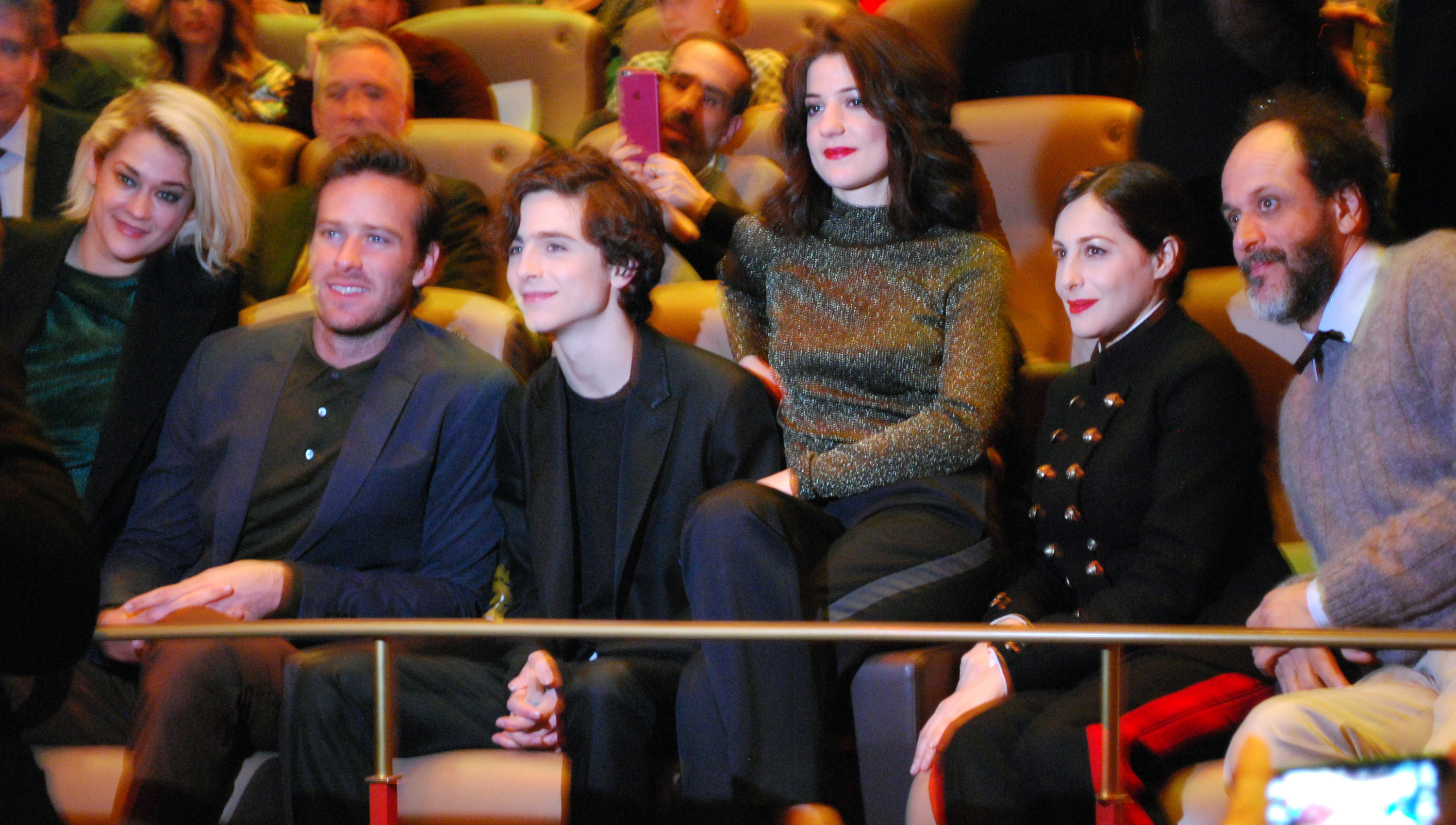
- Victoire Du Bois, Armie Hammer, Timothée Chalamet, Esther Garrel, Amira Casar, and Luca Guadagnino at the screening of Call Me by Your Name at the 67th Berlin International Film Festival in 2017
Accolades
Award	Wins	Nominations
AACTA International Awards	0	5
AARP's Movies for Grownups Awards	0	1
Academy Awards	1	4
Adelaide Film Festival	0	1
African-American Film Critics Association	1	1
Alliance of Women Film Journalists	1	4
Amanda Award	0	1
American Film Institute	1	1
Austin Film Critics Association	4	6
Australian Film Critics Association	0	1
Berlin International Film Festival	0	1
Bodil Awards	0	1
Boston Society of Film Critics	1	1
BreakTudo Awards	0	1
British Academy Film Awards	1	4
British Film Institute	1	1
Calgary International Film Festival	1	1
Capri Hollywood International Film Festival	1	1
Chicago Film Critics Association	3	8
Cinema for Peace Awards	0	1
Critics' Choice Movie Awards	1	8
Dallas–Fort Worth Film Critics Association	3	3
David di Donatello	2	12
Detroit Film Critics Society	0	3
Dorian Awards	5	9
Dublin Film Critics' Circle	4	4
Empire Awards	0	5
European Film Awards	1	1
FEST Film Festival	0	1
Florida Film Critics Circle	3	6
Georgia Film Critics Association	0	6
Ghent International Film Festival	1	2
GLAAD Media Award	1	1
Golden Ciak Awards	3	6
Golden Globe Awards	0	3
Golden Tomato Awards	1	2
Golden Trailer Awards	1	1
Gotham Awards	2	4
Grammy Awards	0	2
Grande Prêmio do Cinema Brasileiro	0	1
Guild of Music Supervisors Awards	2	2
Hollywood Film Awards	1	1
Houston Film Critics Society	0	5
IFTA Film & Drama Awards	0	1
Independent Spirit Awards	2	6
IndieWire Critics Poll	6	6
International Cinephile Society	5	11
Jameson CineFest–Miskolc International Film Festival	0	1
Jim Ridley Memorial Film Poll	1	1
La Roche-sur-Yon International Film Festival	1	1
Ljubljana International Film Festival	1	1
Lisbon & Estoril Film Festival	1	2
Los Angeles Film Critics Association	3	3
Los Angeles Italia Film Festival	1	1
Los Angeles Online Film Critics Society	1	6
London Film Critics' Circle	1	3
Melbourne International Film Festival	1	1
MTV Movie & TV Awards	0	2
Nastro d'Argento	1	3
National Board of Review	2	2
National Society of Film Critics	2	2
New York Film Critics Circle	1	1
New York Film Critics Online	2	2
Online Film Critics Society	2	6
Palm Springs International Film Festival	1	1
Producers Guild of America Awards	0	1
Robert Awards	0	1
San Diego Film Critics Society	2	6
San Francisco Film Critics Circle	1	5
San Sebastián International Film Festival	0	1
Santa Barbara International Film Festival	1	1
Satellite Awards	0	3
Seattle Film Critics Society	0	1
Sergio Amidei Award	0	1
Screen Actors Guild Awards	0	1
Singapore International Film Festival	1	1
St. Louis Film Critics Association	0	2
St. Louis International Film Festival	1	1
Sydney Film Festival	1	1
Time Out Film Poll	2	2
Toronto Film Critics Association	2	2
Toronto International Film Festival	1	1
Turkish Film Critics Association	1	1
USC Scripter Award	1	1
Vancouver Film Critics Circle	0	2
Village Voice Film Poll	7	7
Washington D.C. Area Film Critics Association	0	5
Women Film Critics Circle	0	1
Writers Guild of America Awards	1	1

Totals (Note: Certain award groups do not simply award one winner. They acknowledge several different recipients, have runners-up, and have third place. Since this is a specific recognition and is different from losing an award, runner-up mentions are considered wins in this award tally. For simplification and to avoid errors, each award in this list has been presumed to have had a prior nomination.)
- Wins: 107
- Nominations: 254

Call Me by Your Name is a 2017 coming-of-age drama film directed by Luca Guadagnino. The screenplay, written by James Ivory, is based on André Aciman's 2007 novel of the same name. Set in Italy in 1983, the film follows Elio Perlman (Timothée Chalamet), a Jewish-Italian boy, and Oliver (Armie Hammer), a visiting American Jewish scholar, and their ensuing romantic relationship. Michael Stuhlbarg, Amira Casar, Esther Garrel, and Victoire Du Bois feature in supporting roles. Sayombhu Mukdeeprom served as the cinematographer and Sufjan Stevens contributed three songs to the soundtrack.

The film premiered at the Sundance Film Festival on January 22, 2017. Sony Pictures Classics gave the film a limited release in the United States on November 24, 2017, before a wide release on January 19, 2018. Its $101,219 per theater average was the highest opening average of the year, and has earned $41.9 million at the worldwide box office, against a production budget of $3.5 million. Call Me by Your Name received widespread acclaim, particularly for its direction, cinematography, screenplay, music, and performances. Review aggregator Rotten Tomatoes surveyed 354 reviews and judged 95% of them to be positive. Metacritic calculated a weighted average score of 93/100 based on 53 reviews, indicating "universal acclaim". Call Me by Your Name was Metacritic's fifth-best reviewed film of 2017.

The film garnered four nominations at the 90th Academy Awards, including Best Picture and Best Original Song ("Mystery of Love"). Timothée Chalamet became the third-youngest Best Actor nominee and the youngest since 19-year-old Mickey Rooney in 1939—the first person born in the 1990s to be nominated in the category, and Ivory received his first Academy Award for Best Adapted Screenplay. He also won Best Adapted Screenplay at the 71st British Academy Film Awards, making him the oldest-ever winner in any competitive category for both awards at the age of 89. At the latter award ceremony, the film was also nominated for Best Film, Best Director (Guadagnino), and Best Actor in a Leading Role (Chalamet). Critics' Choice Movie Awards, USC Scripter Award, and Writers Guild of America awarded Ivory for his screenplay.

Call Me by Your Name received three nominations at the 27th Gotham Independent Film Awards, winning Best Feature and Breakthrough Actor for Chalamet. The actor was nominated for Golden Globe Award for Best Actor – Motion Picture Drama, along with nominations for Best Supporting Actor for Hammer, and Best Motion Picture – Drama at its 75th ceremony. The film led the 33rd Independent Spirit Awards with six nominations, winning Best Male Lead (Chalamet) and Best Cinematography (Mukdeeprom). It went on to win the GLAAD Media Award for Outstanding Film – Wide Release at its 29th ceremony. At the 24th Screen Actors Guild Awards, Chalamet was nominated for Outstanding Performance by a Male Actor in a Leading Role. The National Board of Review and Hollywood Film Awards both awarded him their Breakout Actor Awards.

The American Film Institute and National Board of Review included Call Me by Your Name in their list of top ten films of 2017. In Italy, it received six nominations at the 33rd Golden Ciak Awards, winning Best Film, Best Poster, and Best Editing for Walter Fasano. He later won Best Editing at the 73rd Nastro d'Argento Awards. The film won the People's Choice Award for Best European Film at the 31st European Film Awards. In 2019, it garnered twelve nominations at the David di Donatello Awards, including Best Film and Best Director for Guadagnino. The film was also nominated for the Bodil Award for Best Non-American Film and Robert Award for Best English Language Film. At the 61st Annual Grammy Awards, the soundtrack was nominated for Best Compilation Soundtrack for Visual Media, and Stevens received his first nomination for Best Song Written for Visual Media ("Mystery of Love").

== Accolades ==
Award	Date of ceremony	Category	Recipients	Result	Ref.
AACTA International Awards	January 5, 2018	Best Film	Call Me by Your Name	Nominated	
AACTA International Awards	January 5, 2018	Best Direction	Luca Guadagnino	Nominated	
AACTA International Awards	January 5, 2018	Best Actor	Timothée Chalamet	Nominated	
AACTA International Awards	January 5, 2018	Best Supporting Actor	Armie Hammer	Nominated	
AACTA International Awards	January 5, 2018	Best Screenplay	James Ivory	Nominated	
AARP's Movies for Grownups Awards	February 5, 2018	Best Screenwriter	James Ivory	Nominated	
Academy Awards	March 4, 2018	Best Picture	Peter Spears, Luca Guadagnino, Émilie Georges and Marco Morabito	Nominated	
Academy Awards	March 4, 2018	Best Actor	Timothée Chalamet	Nominated	
Academy Awards	March 4, 2018	Best Adapted Screenplay	James Ivory	Won	
Academy Awards	March 4, 2018	Best Original Song	"Mystery of Love" by Sufjan Stevens	Nominated	
Adelaide Film Festival	October 12, 2017	Best Feature	Call Me by Your Name	Nominated	
African-American Film Critics Association	December 12, 2017	Top Ten Films	Call Me by Your Name	6th place	
Alliance of Women Film Journalists	January 9, 2018	Best Film	Call Me by Your Name	Nominated	
Alliance of Women Film Journalists	January 9, 2018	Best Actor	Timothée Chalamet	Nominated	
Alliance of Women Film Journalists	January 9, 2018	Best Adapted Screenplay	James Ivory	Won	
Alliance of Women Film Journalists	January 9, 2018	Best Actor in a Supporting Role	Michael Stuhlbarg	Nominated	
Amanda Award	August 18, 2018	Best Foreign Feature Film	Call Me by Your Name	Nominated	
American Film Institute	January 5, 2018	Movies of the Year	Call Me by Your Name	Won	
Austin Film Critics Association	January 8, 2018	Best Film	Call Me by Your Name	Nominated	
Austin Film Critics Association	January 8, 2018	Best Actor	Timothée Chalamet	Won	
Austin Film Critics Association	January 8, 2018	Best Supporting Actor	Armie Hammer	Nominated	
Austin Film Critics Association	January 8, 2018	Best Supporting Actor	Michael Stuhlbarg	Nominated	
Austin Film Critics Association	January 8, 2018	Best Adapted Screenplay	James Ivory	Won	
Austin Film Critics Association	January 8, 2018	Robert R. 'Bobby' McCurdy Memorial Breakthrough Artist Award	Timothée Chalamet (Note: Also for his work in Lady Bird and Hostiles.)	Won	
Austin Film Critics Association	January 8, 2018	Top Ten Films	Call Me by Your Name	2nd place	
Australian Film Critics Association	March 13, 2018	Best International Film (English Language)	Call Me by Your Name	Nominated	
Berlin International Film Festival	February 17, 2017	Teddy Award	Call Me by Your Name	Nominated	
Bodil Awards	March 2, 2019	Best Non-American Film	Call Me by Your Name	Nominated	
Boston Society of Film Critics	December 10, 2017	Best Actor	Timothée Chalamet	Runner-up	
British Academy Film Awards	February 18, 2018	Best Film	Call Me by Your Name	Nominated	
British Academy Film Awards	February 18, 2018	Best Director	Luca Guadagnino	Nominated	
British Academy Film Awards	February 18, 2018	Best Adapted Screenplay	James Ivory	Won	
British Academy Film Awards	February 18, 2018	Best Actor in a Leading Role	Timothée Chalamet	Nominated	
British Film Institute	December 14, 2017	Sight & Sound's Best Films of 2017	Call Me by Your Name	3rd place	
Calgary International Film Festival	October 12, 2017	Fan Favourite Award	Call Me by Your Name	Won	
Capri Hollywood International Film Festival	January 2, 2018	Best Adapted Screenplay	James Ivory and Luca Guadagnino	Won (Note: Shared with Scott Neustadter, Michael H. Weber, Greg Sestero and Tom Bissell for The Disaster Artist.)	
Chéries-Chéris	November 21, 2017	Grand Prize	Call Me by Your Name	Won	
Chicago Film Critics Association	December 12, 2017	Best Film	Call Me by Your Name	Nominated	
Chicago Film Critics Association	December 12, 2017	Best Director	Luca Guadagnino	Nominated	
Chicago Film Critics Association	December 12, 2017	Best Actor	Timothée Chalamet	Won	
Chicago Film Critics Association	December 12, 2017	Best Supporting Actor	Armie Hammer	Nominated	
Chicago Film Critics Association	December 12, 2017	Best Supporting Actor	Michael Stuhlbarg	Nominated	
Chicago Film Critics Association	December 12, 2017	Best Adapted Screenplay	James Ivory	Won	
Chicago Film Critics Association	December 12, 2017	Best Editing	Walter Fasano	Nominated	
Chicago Film Critics Association	December 12, 2017	Most Promising Performer	Timothée Chalamet	Won	
Cinema for Peace Awards	February 19, 2018	Most Valuable Film of the Year	Call Me by Your Name	Nominated	
Critics' Choice Movie Awards	January 11, 2018	Best Picture	Call Me by Your Name	Nominated	
Critics' Choice Movie Awards	January 11, 2018	Best Director	Luca Guadagnino	Nominated	
Critics' Choice Movie Awards	January 11, 2018	Best Actor	Timothée Chalamet	Nominated	
Critics' Choice Movie Awards	January 11, 2018	Best Supporting Actor	Armie Hammer	Nominated	
Critics' Choice Movie Awards	January 11, 2018	Best Supporting Actor	Michael Stuhlbarg	Nominated	
Critics' Choice Movie Awards	January 11, 2018	Best Adapted Screenplay	James Ivory	Won	
Critics' Choice Movie Awards	January 11, 2018	Best Cinematography	Sayombhu Mukdeeprom	Nominated	
Critics' Choice Movie Awards	January 11, 2018	Best Song	"Mystery of Love" by Sufjan Stevens	Nominated	
Dallas–Fort Worth Film Critics Association	December 13, 2017	Best Film	Call Me by Your Name	4th place	
Dallas–Fort Worth Film Critics Association	December 13, 2017	Best Actor	Timothée Chalamet	4th place	
Dallas–Fort Worth Film Critics Association	December 13, 2017	Best Supporting Actor	Armie Hammer	4th place	
David di Donatello	March 27, 2019	Best Film	Call Me by Your Name	Nominated	
David di Donatello	March 27, 2019	Best Director	Luca Guadagnino	Nominated	
David di Donatello	March 27, 2019	Best Adapted Screenplay	James Ivory, Luca Guadagnino and Walter Fasano	Won	
David di Donatello	March 27, 2019	Best Original Song	"Mystery of Love" by Sufjan Stevens	Won	
David di Donatello	March 27, 2019	Best Cinematography	Sayombhu Mukdeeprom	Nominated	
David di Donatello	March 27, 2019	Best Producer	Luca Guadagnino, Émilie Georges, Peter Spears, Marco Morabito, Rodrigo Teixeira, James Ivory and Howard Rosenman	Nominated	
David di Donatello	March 27, 2019	Best Production Design	Samuel Deshors	Nominated	
David di Donatello	March 27, 2019	Best Costumes	Giulia Piersanti	Nominated	
David di Donatello	March 27, 2019	Best Make-up	Fernanda Perez	Nominated	
David di Donatello	March 27, 2019	Best Hairstyling	Manolo García	Nominated	
David di Donatello	March 27, 2019	Best Editing	Walter Fasano	Nominated	
David di Donatello	March 27, 2019	Best Sound	Call Me by Your Name	Nominated	
Detroit Film Critics Society	December 7, 2017	Best Actor	Timothée Chalamet	Nominated	
Detroit Film Critics Society	December 7, 2017	Best Supporting Actor	Michael Stuhlbarg	Nominated	
Detroit Film Critics Society	December 7, 2017	Breakthrough Performance	Timothée Chalamet (Note: Also for his work in Lady Bird and Hot Summer Nights.)	Nominated	
Dorian Awards	February 24, 2018	Film of the Year	Call Me by Your Name	Won	
Dorian Awards	February 24, 2018	Director of the Year (Film or Television)	Luca Guadagnino	Nominated	
Dorian Awards	February 24, 2018	Best Performance of the Year – Actor	Timothée Chalamet	Won	
Dorian Awards	February 24, 2018	Supporting Film Performance of the Year – Actor	Armie Hammer	Nominated	
Dorian Awards	February 24, 2018	Supporting Film Performance of the Year – Actor	Michael Stuhlbarg	Won	
Dorian Awards	February 24, 2018	LGBTQ Film of the Year	Call Me by Your Name	Won	
Dorian Awards	February 24, 2018	Screenplay of the Year (Original or Adapted)	James Ivory	Nominated	
Dorian Awards	February 24, 2018	Visually Striking Film of the Year	Call Me by Your Name	Nominated	
Dorian Awards	February 24, 2018	'We're Wilde About You!' Rising Star Award	Timothée Chalamet	Won	
Dublin Film Critics' Circle	December 13, 2017	Best Film	Call Me by Your Name	7th place (Note: Tied with The Florida Project.)	
Dublin Film Critics' Circle	December 13, 2017	Best Actor	Timothée Chalamet	4th place	
Dublin Film Critics' Circle	December 13, 2017	Best Actor	Armie Hammer	6th place	
Dublin Film Critics' Circle	December 13, 2017	Best Cinematography	Sayombhu Mukdeeprom	Runner-up	
Empire Awards	March 18, 2018	Best Film	Call Me by Your Name	Nominated	
Empire Awards	March 18, 2018	Best Actor	Armie Hammer	Nominated	
Empire Awards	March 18, 2018	Best Male Newcomer	Timothée Chalamet	Nominated	
Empire Awards	March 18, 2018	Best Screenplay	Call Me by Your Name	Nominated	
Empire Awards	March 18, 2018	Best Soundtrack	Call Me by Your Name	Nominated	
European Film Awards	December 15, 2018	People's Choice Award for Best European Film	Call Me by Your Name	Won	
FEST Film Festival	March 4, 2018	Merlinka Festival – 'Marble' Queer Award	Call Me by Your Name	Nominated	
Florida Film Critics Circle	December 23, 2017	Best Film	Call Me by Your Name	Nominated	
Florida Film Critics Circle	December 23, 2017	Best Actor	Timothée Chalamet	Won	
Florida Film Critics Circle	December 23, 2017	Best Supporting Actor	Armie Hammer	Nominated	
Florida Film Critics Circle	December 23, 2017	Best Supporting Actor	Michael Stuhlbarg	Nominated	
Florida Film Critics Circle	December 23, 2017	Best Adapted Screenplay	James Ivory	Won	
Florida Film Critics Circle	December 23, 2017	Pauline Kael Breakout Award	Timothée Chalamet	Won	
Gaudí Awards	February 2, 2019	Best European Film	Call Me by Your Name	Nominated	
Georgia Film Critics Association	January 12, 2018	Best Film	Call Me by Your Name	Nominated	
Georgia Film Critics Association	January 12, 2018	Best Actor	Timothée Chalamet	Nominated	
Georgia Film Critics Association	January 12, 2018	Best Supporting Actor	Michael Stuhlbarg	Nominated	
Georgia Film Critics Association	January 12, 2018	Best Adapted Screenplay	James Ivory	Nominated	
Georgia Film Critics Association	January 12, 2018	Best Original Song	"Mystery of Love" by Sufjan Stevens	Nominated	
Georgia Film Critics Association	January 12, 2018	Breakthrough Award	Timothée Chalamet (Note: Also for his work in Hostiles, Hot Summer Nights, and Lady Bird.)	Nominated	
Ghent International Film Festival	October 20, 2017	Grand Prix	Call Me by Your Name	Nominated	
Ghent International Film Festival	October 20, 2017	Explore Award	Call Me by Your Name	Won	
GLAAD Media Awards	May 5, 2018	Outstanding Film – Wide Release	Call Me by Your Name	Won	
Golden Ciak Awards	June 7, 2018	Alice/Giovani	Call Me by Your Name	Nominated	
Golden Ciak Awards	June 7, 2018	Best Film	Call Me by Your Name	Won	
Golden Ciak Awards	June 7, 2018	Best Poster	Luca Guadagnino, Chen Li and Carmelo Pirrone	Won	
Golden Ciak Awards	June 7, 2018	Best Editing	Walter Fasano	Won	
Golden Ciak Awards	June 7, 2018	Best Producer	Luca Guadagnino, Marco Morabito and Francesco Melzi d'Eril	Nominated	
Golden Ciak Awards	June 7, 2018	Best Costume Design	Giulia Piersanti	Nominated	
Golden Globe Awards	January 7, 2018	Best Motion Picture – Drama	Call Me by Your Name	Nominated	
Golden Globe Awards	January 7, 2018	Best Actor – Motion Picture Drama	Timothée Chalamet	Nominated	
Golden Globe Awards	January 7, 2018	Best Supporting Actor – Motion Picture	Armie Hammer	Nominated	
Golden Schmoes Awards	March 2, 2018	Breakthrough Performance of the Year	Timothée Chalamet	Nominated	
Golden Tomato Awards	January 4, 2018	Best-Reviewed Limited Release	Call Me by Your Name	Won	
Golden Tomato Awards	January 4, 2018	Best-Reviewed Romance Movies	Call Me by Your Name	2nd place	
Golden Tomato Awards	January 25, 2019	Fans' Choice for Favorite Movie of 2018	Call Me by Your Name	Nominated	
Golden Trailer Awards	May 31, 2018	Best Romance	Call Me by Your Name ("Theatrical Trailer")	Won	
Gotham Awards	November 27, 2017	Best Feature	Call Me by Your Name	Won	
Gotham Awards	November 27, 2017	Best Screenplay	James Ivory	Nominated	
Gotham Awards	November 27, 2017	Breakthrough Actor	Timothée Chalamet	Won	
Gotham Awards	November 27, 2017	Audience Award	Call Me by Your Name	Nominated	
Grammy Awards	February 10, 2019	Best Compilation Soundtrack for Visual Media	Luca Guadagnino and Robin Urdang for Call Me by Your Name: Original Motion Picture Soundtrack	Nominated	
Grammy Awards	February 10, 2019	Best Song Written for Visual Media	"Mystery of Love" by Sufjan Stevens	Nominated	
Grande Prêmio do Cinema Brasileiro	August 14, 2019	Best Foreign Feature Film	Call Me by Your Name	Nominated	
Guild of Music Supervisors Awards	February 8, 2018	Best Music Supervision for Film: Budgeted Under 5 Million Dollars	Robin Urdang	Won	
Guild of Music Supervisors Awards	February 8, 2018	Best Song/Recording Created for a Film	Robin Urdang (supervisor) for "Mystery of Love"	Won	
Hollywood Film Awards	November 6, 2017	Hollywood Breakout Performance Actor Award	Timothée Chalamet	Won	
Houston Film Critics Society	January 6, 2018	Best Picture	Call Me by Your Name	Nominated	
Houston Film Critics Society	January 6, 2018	Best Actor	Timothée Chalamet	Nominated	
Houston Film Critics Society	January 6, 2018	Best Supporting Actor	Michael Stuhlbarg	Nominated	
Houston Film Critics Society	January 6, 2018	Best Cinematography	Sayombhu Mukdeeprom	Nominated	
Houston Film Critics Society	January 6, 2018	Best Original Song	"Visions of Gideon" by Sufjan Stevens	Nominated	
IFTA Film & Drama Awards	February 15, 2018	International Actor	Timothée Chalamet	Nominated	
Independent Spirit Awards	March 3, 2018	Best Feature	Call Me by Your Name	Nominated	
Independent Spirit Awards	March 3, 2018	Best Director	Luca Guadagnino	Nominated	
Independent Spirit Awards	March 3, 2018	Best Male Lead	Timothée Chalamet	Won	
Independent Spirit Awards	March 3, 2018	Best Supporting Male	Armie Hammer	Nominated	
Independent Spirit Awards	March 3, 2018	Best Cinematography	Sayombhu Mukdeeprom	Won	
Independent Spirit Awards	March 3, 2018	Best Editing	Walter Fasano	Nominated	
IndieWire Critics Poll	December 19, 2017	Best Picture	Call Me by Your Name	7th place	
IndieWire Critics Poll	December 19, 2017	Best Director	Luca Guadagnino	2nd place	
IndieWire Critics Poll	December 19, 2017	Best Actor	Timothée Chalamet	Won	
IndieWire Critics Poll	December 19, 2017	Best Supporting Actor	Armie Hammer	3rd place	
IndieWire Critics Poll	December 19, 2017	Best Supporting Actor	Michael Stuhlbarg	4th place	
IndieWire Critics Poll	December 19, 2017	Best Screenplay	Call Me by Your Name	3rd place	
IndieWire Critics Poll	December 19, 2017	Best Cinematography	Call Me by Your Name	4th place	
International Cinephile Society	February 4, 2018	Best Picture	Call Me by Your Name	Won	
International Cinephile Society	February 4, 2018	Best Director	Luca Guadagnino	Runner-up	
International Cinephile Society	February 4, 2018	Best Actor	Timothée Chalamet	Won	
International Cinephile Society	February 4, 2018	Best Supporting Actor	Armie Hammer	Nominated	
International Cinephile Society	February 4, 2018	Best Supporting Actor	Michael Stuhlbarg	Won	
International Cinephile Society	February 4, 2018	Best Supporting Actress	Amira Casar	Nominated	
International Cinephile Society	February 4, 2018	Best Adapted Screenplay	James Ivory	Won	
International Cinephile Society	February 4, 2018	Best Cinematography	Sayombhu Mukdeeprom	Nominated	
International Cinephile Society	February 4, 2018	Best Production Design	Samuel Deshors	Nominated	
International Cinephile Society	February 4, 2018	Best Original Score	Sufjan Stevens	Nominated	
International Cinephile Society	February 4, 2018	Best Ensemble	Call Me by Your Name	Nominated	
Jameson CineFest–Miskolc International Film Festival	September 17, 2017	Emeric Pressburger Prize	Call Me by Your Name	Nominated	
Jim Ridley Memorial Film Poll	January 4, 2018	Films of the Year	Call Me by Your Name	3rd place	
La Roche-sur-Yon International Film Festival	October 22, 2017	Special Jury Prize	Call Me by Your Name	Won	
Ljubljana International Film Festival	November 18, 2017	Youth Jury Award	Call Me by Your Name	Won	
Lisbon & Estoril Film Festival	November 26, 2017	Jaeger–LeCoultre Best Film Award	Call Me by Your Name	Nominated	
Lisbon & Estoril Film Festival	November 26, 2017	NOS Audience Award	Call Me by Your Name	Won	
Los Angeles Film Critics Association	January 13, 2018	Best Film	Call Me by Your Name	Won	
Los Angeles Film Critics Association	January 13, 2018	Best Director	Luca Guadagnino	Won (Note: Tied with Guillermo del Toro for The Shape of Water.)	
Los Angeles Film Critics Association	January 13, 2018	Best Actor	Timothée Chalamet	Won	
Los Angeles Italia Film Festival	March 3, 2018	Excellence Award	Luca Guadagnino and Marco Morabito	Won	
Los Angeles Online Film Critics Society	January 3, 2018	Best Picture	Call Me by Your Name	Nominated	
Los Angeles Online Film Critics Society	January 3, 2018	Best Male Director	Luca Guadagnino	Nominated	
Los Angeles Online Film Critics Society	January 3, 2018	Best Performance By An Actor Or Actress Under 23 Years Old	Timothée Chalamet	Nominated	
Los Angeles Online Film Critics Society	January 3, 2018	Best Adapted Screenplay	James Ivory	Nominated	
Los Angeles Online Film Critics Society	January 3, 2018	Best Supporting Actor	Michael Stuhlbarg	Won (Note: Tied with Patrick Stewart for Logan.)	
Los Angeles Online Film Critics Society	January 3, 2018	Best Actor	Timothée Chalamet	Nominated	
London Film Critics' Circle	January 28, 2018	Film of the Year	Call Me by Your Name	Nominated	
London Film Critics' Circle	January 28, 2018	Director of the Year	Luca Guadagnino	Nominated	
London Film Critics' Circle	January 28, 2018	Actor of the Year	Timothée Chalamet	Won	
London Film Critics' Circle	January 28, 2018	Supporting Actor of the Year	Michael Stuhlbarg	Nominated	
London Film Critics' Circle	January 28, 2018	Screenwriter of the Year	James Ivory	Nominated	
Melbourne International Film Festival	August 20, 2017	Audience Award	Call Me by Your Name	Won	
MTV Movie & TV Awards	June 18, 2018	Best Performance in a Movie	Timothée Chalamet	Nominated	
MTV Movie & TV Awards	June 18, 2018	Best Musical Moment	Elio crying through the end credits	Nominated	
Nastro d'Argento	June 30, 2018	Best Film	Call Me by Your Name	Nominated	
Nastro d'Argento	June 30, 2018	Best Director	Luca Guadagnino	Nominated	
Nastro d'Argento	June 30, 2018	Best Editing	Walter Fasano	Won (Note: Tied with Marco Spoletini for Dogman.)	
National Board of Review	January 9, 2018	Top Ten Films	Call Me by Your Name	Won	
National Board of Review	January 9, 2018	Breakthrough Performance	Timothée Chalamet	Won	
National Society of Film Critics	January 6, 2018	Best Actor	Timothée Chalamet	3rd place	
National Society of Film Critics	January 6, 2018	Best Supporting Actor	Michael Stuhlbarg (Note: Also for his work in The Post and The Shape of Water.)	2nd place	
New York Film Critics Circle	January 3, 2018	Best Actor	Timothée Chalamet	Won	
New York Film Critics Online	December 10, 2017	Breakthrough Performer	Timothée Chalamet	Won	
New York Film Critics Online	December 10, 2017	Top Ten Films	Call Me by Your Name	Won	
Online Film Critics Society	December 28, 2017	Best Picture	Call Me by Your Name	Nominated	
Online Film Critics Society	December 28, 2017	Best Actor	Timothée Chalamet	Nominated	
Online Film Critics Society	December 28, 2017	Best Supporting Actor	Armie Hammer	Nominated	
Online Film Critics Society	December 28, 2017	Best Supporting Actor	Michael Stuhlbarg	Nominated	
Online Film Critics Society	December 28, 2017	Best Adapted Screenplay	James Ivory	Won	
Online Film Critics Society	December 28, 2017	Best Breakout Star	Timothée Chalamet	Won	
Palm Springs International Film Festival	January 2, 2018	Rising Star Award	Timothée Chalamet	Won	
Producers Guild of America Awards	January 20, 2018	Best Theatrical Motion Picture	Peter Spears, Luca Guadagnino, Émilie Georges and Marco Morabito	Nominated	
Robert Awards	February 3, 2019	Best American Film	Call Me by Your Name	Nominated	
San Diego Film Critics Society	December 11, 2017	Best Film	Call Me by Your Name	Nominated	
San Diego Film Critics Society	December 11, 2017	Best Actor	Timothée Chalamet	Nominated	
San Diego Film Critics Society	December 11, 2017	Best Adapted Screenplay	James Ivory	Nominated	
San Diego Film Critics Society	December 11, 2017	Best Use of Music	Call Me by Your Name	Runner-up	
San Diego Film Critics Society	December 11, 2017	Breakthrough Artist	Timothée Chalamet	Nominated	
San Diego Film Critics Society	December 11, 2017	Body of Work	Michael Stuhlbarg	Won	
San Francisco Film Critics Circle	December 10, 2017	Best Film	Call Me by Your Name	Nominated	
San Francisco Film Critics Circle	December 10, 2017	Best Actor	Timothée Chalamet	Nominated	
San Francisco Film Critics Circle	December 10, 2017	Best Supporting Actor	Armie Hammer	Nominated	
San Francisco Film Critics Circle	December 10, 2017	Best Supporting Actor	Michael Stuhlbarg	Nominated	
San Francisco Film Critics Circle	December 10, 2017	Best Adapted Screenplay	James Ivory	Won	
San Sebastián International Film Festival	September 29, 2017	Sebastiane Award	Call Me by Your Name	Nominated	
Santa Barbara International Film Festival	January 31, 2018	Virtuoso Award	Timothée Chalamet	Won	
Satellite Awards	February 11, 2018	Best Film	Call Me by Your Name	Nominated	
Satellite Awards	February 11, 2018	Best Supporting Actor	Armie Hammer	Nominated	
Satellite Awards	February 11, 2018	Best Adapted Screenplay	James Ivory	Nominated	
Screen Actors Guild Awards	January 21, 2018	Outstanding Performance by a Male Actor in a Leading Role	Timothée Chalamet	Nominated	
Seattle Film Critics Society	December 18, 2017	Best Ensemble Cast	Call Me by Your Name	Nominated	
Sergio Amidei Award	July 18, 2018	Best Screenplay International	Call Me by Your Name	Nominated	
Singapore International Film Festival	December 3, 2017	Audience Choice Award	Call Me by Your Name	Won	
St. Louis Film Critics Association	December 17, 2017	Best Adapted Screenplay	James Ivory and André Aciman	Nominated	
St. Louis Film Critics Association	December 17, 2017	Best Scene	Mr. Perlman's (Michael Stuhlbarg) closing monologue	Nominated	
St. Louis International Film Festival	November 12, 2017	Best of Fest Audience Choice Awards	Call Me by Your Name	Won	
Sydney Film Festival	June 18, 2017	Foxtel Movies Audience Award	Call Me by Your Name	2nd place	
Time Out Film Poll	April 13, 2018	The 50 Best Gay Movies	Call Me by Your Name	8th place	
Time Out Film Poll	April 12, 2018	The 100 Best Romantic Movies	Call Me by Your Name	15th place	
Toronto Film Critics Association	December 10, 2017	Best Actor	Timothée Chalamet	Runner-up	
Toronto Film Critics Association	December 10, 2017	Best Supporting Actor	Michael Stuhlbarg	Runner-up	
Toronto International Film Festival	September 17, 2017	People's Choice Award	Call Me by Your Name	3rd place	
Turkish Film Critics Association	January 1, 2019	Best Foreign Film	Call Me by Your Name	3rd place	
USC Scripter Award	February 10, 2018	Best Screenplay	André Aciman and James Ivory	Won	
Vancouver Film Critics Circle	January 8, 2018	Best Actor	Timothée Chalamet	Nominated	
Vancouver Film Critics Circle	January 8, 2018	Best Supporting Actor	Armie Hammer	Nominated	
Village Voice Film Poll	February 13, 2018	Best Film	Call Me by Your Name	4th place	
Village Voice Film Poll	February 13, 2018	Best Lead Performance	Timothée Chalamet	2nd place	
Village Voice Film Poll	February 13, 2018	Best Lead Performance	Armie Hammer	86th place (Note: Tied with Seo-hyun Ahn for Okja, Jennifer Ferrin for Mosaic, Carla Gugino for Gerald's Game, Sherwan Haji for The Other Side of Hope, Anne Heche for Catfight, Ryunosuke Kamiki for Your Name, Noa Koler for The Wedding Plan, Kyle Mooney for Brigsby Bear, Keanu Reeves for John Wick: Chapter 2, Lee Se-rang for Autumn, Autumn, Ben Stiller for The Meyerowitz Stories, and Nakhane Touré for The Wound.)	
Village Voice Film Poll	February 13, 2018	Best Supporting Performance	Michael Stuhlbarg	5th place	
Village Voice Film Poll	February 13, 2018	Best Supporting Performance	Armie Hammer	12th place	
Village Voice Film Poll	February 13, 2018	Best Director	Luca Guadagnino	5th place	
Village Voice Film Poll	February 13, 2018	Best Screenplay	James Ivory	4th place (Note: Tied with Terence Davies for A Quiet Passion, Martin McDonagh for Three Billboards Outside Ebbing, Missouri, and Ruben Östlund for The Square.)	
Washington D.C. Area Film Critics Association	December 8, 2017	Best Film	Call Me by Your Name	Nominated	
Washington D.C. Area Film Critics Association	December 8, 2017	Best Actor	Timothée Chalamet	Nominated	
Washington D.C. Area Film Critics Association	December 8, 2017	Best Supporting Actor	Armie Hammer	Nominated	
Washington D.C. Area Film Critics Association	December 8, 2017	Best Supporting Actor	Michael Stuhlbarg	Nominated	
Washington D.C. Area Film Critics Association	December 8, 2017	Best Adapted Screenplay	James Ivory	Nominated	
Washington D.C. Area Film Critics Association	December 8, 2017	Best Cinematography	Sayombhu Mukdeeprom	Nominated	
Women Film Critics Circle	December 21, 2017	Best Actor	Timothée Chalamet	Nominated	
Writers Guild of America Awards	February 11, 2018	Best Adapted Screenplay	James Ivory	Won	

== See also ==
- 2017 in film
