= I, Tonya (soundtrack) =

I, Tonya (Original Motion Picture Soundtrack)

Soundtrack album by various artists
- Released: December 8, 2017
- Genre: Rock; soundtrack
- Length: 67:07
- Label: Milan
- Producer: Susan Jacobs

I, Tonya (Original Motion Picture Soundtrack) is the compilation soundtrack to the 2017 biographical black comedy film I, Tonya, directed by Craig Gillespie. Based on the life of figure skater Tonya Harding and her connection to the 1994 attack on her rival Nancy Kerrigan, the film starred Margot Robbie in the title role. The album featured several popular non-original compositions, and few cues from the incidental underscore composed by Peter Nashel. It was released on December 8, 2017, by Milan Records, the same day coinciding with the film's theatrical release.

== Background ==
Susan Jacobs, the music supervisor of the film, was hired by Gillespie, for the licensing of several tracks from the album, when the film was in post-production. She compared the film as a cross-over between "the scale of The Big Lebowski (1998), the soundtrack of American Hustle (2013) or any Scorsese film soundtrack", but the film had the heart of Silver Linings Playbook (2012). (Note: Susan worked as music supervisor on American Hustle and Silver Linings Playbook.) The film featured over 25 songs, but only 13 tracks are included in the album.

"Spirit in the Sky" by Norman Greenbaum, a track that was featured in the soundtrack of Guardians of the Galaxy (2014), is also used for this film, it plays when Harding's father leaves the family, leaving her disappointed and from there, the scene transitions from a teenage Harding meets Jeff Gillooly (Sebastian Stan). She earlier licensed the track for Sunshine Cleaning (2008) in the main credits, but later decided to use it again, after watching the film. The song worked as "it gave this energy to the first time we see her as an adult" and comes in there "with a lot of punch and power". "Romeo And Juliet" from Dire Straits which highlighted the burgeoning relationship of Harding and Gillooly, was an integral part of the story, as Craig's wife had given him the song, before the film's shooting began and for her "the lyrics felt like the film's story". However, Dire Straits' founder Mark Knopfler was not willing to license the song for use. Jacobs said to Knopfler about the premise and also let him watch the film, after which Knopler agreed to use the song. Some of the songs of the soundtrack were used in Harding's real routines, such as ZZ Top's "Sleeping Bag".

The track "Dream a Little Dream of Me" performed by Doris Day was not Jacobs' original choice to use in the film. She initially planned to use "Over the Rainbow". However, the decision was made around the time of the Manchester Arena bombing; Ariana Grande performed "Over the Rainbow" at the One Love Manchester benefit concert, and Jacobs felt that the song "took a different meaning" and wanted "to give respect to that [after it became synonymous with healing in the attack's aftermath]". Hence, she replaced it with "Dream a Little Dream of Me" as "the healing song" for the film, which she felt added "a really good contrast to the rest of the soundtrack". Tracks from 1970s such as Fleetwood Mac's "The Chain" or Supertramp's "Goodbye Stranger" came from an era when music was "powerful and full" and "warm." Jacobs felt the "classic rock songs filled the picture without getting in the way of the story."

According to critic Emily Manning of Vice Media's i-D magazine, she wrote that En Vogue's "Free Your Mind" and Heart's "Barracuda", created "an interesting parallel between Tonya's tenacity and ambition." For the ending track – Siouxsie and the Banshees' cover of "The Passenger", Jacobs said that the original version of was "something obviously female and the lyrics [resonated]". Sufijan Stevens' song "Tonya Harding" was rejected by Jacobs and Gillespie for using in the film.

== Recording and composition ==
Peter Nashel, composed the incidental music for the film, after being recommended by Jacobs. This was Nashel's first feature film as he previously scored for documentaries and television shows, and took over three weeks to write the film score. The film score and the incorporated songs did not occupy the entire film, but only two-thirds of the underscore is featured in the film, that "ends up being kind of a melodramatic character that heightens the actions surrounding the incident". The scoring sessions took within a quick pace, as much of the score being written and composed by summer (June–August), before the premiere at the Toronto International Film Festival on September 8, 2017.

Nashel focused on a sound initially and it took much time to get the tone right, as the film served as a mockumentary. He created the score with percussion instruments and trashcans, that creates a "slightly more jangled, de-tuned sounds" and do not have a "clean precision of what is expected in contemporary scores". The piano was used as a key instrument in the film, and the score is accompanied by 10-piece string orchestra and a small woodwinds section. The score, at regular intervals, produces odd overtures and sounds.

== Reception ==
Will Hodgkinson of The Times called it as a "broad, borderline cheesy, nostalgic soundtrack featuring big songs that scream of frosted hair and shopping malls". British Film Institute magazine called the soundtrack as "evocative", while Helen O'Hara of Empire called it as "pumping". Connect Savannah's Jim Morekis wrote "A particularly brilliant decision in the film has to do with the soundtrack. Most of the many vintage tunes you hear in the movie aren’t from the late ‘80s and ‘90s at all – when most of the actual plot happens – but from the decade prior when Harding was growing up dirt-poor in Oregon (think Heart’s “Barracuda,” Foreigner's “Feels Like the First Time,” etc.) Instead of the soundtrack of the era, we hear the soundtrack of Tonya Harding's own life and girlhood, thus giving us more insight into what made her what she is." Christy Lemire of RogerEbert.com wrote "Great songs, all, but the classic rock needle drops can be distractingly obvious."

== Track listing ==
No.	Title	Artist	Length
1.	"Fair to Love Me"	Mark Batson	2:08
2.	"Devil Woman"	Cliff Richard	3:34
3.	"Shooting Star"	Bad Company	6:15
4.	"Romeo and Juliet"	Dire Straits	6:01
5.	"A Fair Shot"	Peter Nashel	1:52
6.	"Free Your Mind"	En Vogue	4:53
7.	"Goodbye Stranger"	Supertramp	5:48
8.	"How Can You Mend a Broken Heart"	Chris Stills	4:00
9.	"The Chain"	Fleetwood Mac	4:29
10.	"The Incident"	Peter Nashel	2:51
11.	"Barracuda"	Heart	4:22
12.	"Gloria"	Laura Branigan	4:49
13.	"Gone Daddy Gone"	Violent Femmes	3:06
14.	"Dream a Little Dream of Me"	Doris Day	3:43
15.	"The Passenger"	Siouxsie and the Banshees	4:09
16.	"Tonya Suite"	Peter Nashel	5:04

== Film music not included in the album ==
- "Hey Mama Keep Your Mouth Shut" by Dr. Feelgood
- "Shining Star" by Fun Lovin' Criminals
- "Spirit in the Sky" by Norman Greenbaum
- "Can't You See" by The Marshall Tucker Band
- "Sleeping Bag" by ZZ Top
- "Mysterious Night" by Damon Criswell
- "Feels Like the First Time" by Foreigner
- "Little Girl Bad" by Joanie Sommers
- "Every 1's a Winner" by Hot Chocolate
- "People Are Still Having Sex" by LaTour
- "25 or 6 to 4" by Chicago

Note: Additional songs adapted from film credits

== Charts ==
Chart (2017–2018)	Peak position
UK Soundtrack Albums (OCC)	43
US Billboard 200	105
US Soundtrack Albums (Billboard)	14

== Release history ==
Region	Date	Format(s)	Label	Version(s)	Catalog Code	Ref.
United States	December 8, 2017	CD	Milan Records	Standard	399 975–2	
United States	March 30, 2018	Vinyl	Milan Records	Standard	MLN1-36927	
United States	March 30, 2018	Vinyl	Milan Records	Autographed	MLN1-36927	
United States	March 30, 2018	Vinyl	Milan Records	Limited Edition	MLN1-36927	
Europe	December 22, 2017	CD	Universal Music; Warner Music International	Standard	399 975–2	
Europe	March 30, 2018	Vinyl	Universal Music; Warner Music International	Standard	399 999–2	
