= Call Me by Your Name: Original Motion Picture Soundtrack =

Soundtrack album by various artists
- Released: November 3, 2017
- Genres: Pop; classical
- Length: 71:08
- Labels: Madison Gate; Sony Music Masterworks

Singles from Call Me by Your Name: Original Motion Picture Soundtrack
- 1. "Mystery of Love" Released: December 1, 2017

Call Me by Your Name: Original Motion Picture Soundtrack is the soundtrack to the 2017 romantic drama film, Call Me by Your Name. It features songs by The Psychedelic Furs, Franco Battiato, Loredana Bertè, Bandolero, Giorgio Moroder, Joe Esposito, and F. R. David, with compositions by John Adams, Erik Satie, Ryuichi Sakamoto, Johann Sebastian Bach, and Maurice Ravel. American singer-songwriter Sufjan Stevens composed two original songs for the film, and the soundtrack also features a remix of his track "Futile Devices". Stevens' original song "Mystery of Love" was nominated for the Academy Award for Best Original Song at the 2018 ceremony. At the 61st Annual Grammy Awards, "Mystery of Love" received a nomination for Best Song Written for Visual Media and the soundtrack received one for Best Compilation Soundtrack for Visual Media.

== Release ==
The soundtrack album was digitally released under Madison Gate Records and Sony Classical on November 3, 2017 and physically on November 17. "Mystery of Love" was first featured in the film's first trailer, released on August 1, 2017. Its music video was released on January 4, 2018, featuring footage taken at The National Archaeological Museum of Naples. It was released on vinyl on February 16, 2018. The limited release consists of 1,000 copies printed on blue vinyl and includes a poster. The limited "peach season" edition consists of 14,999 copies printed on peach-scented vinyl was released on August 3, 2018, by Music on Vinyl.

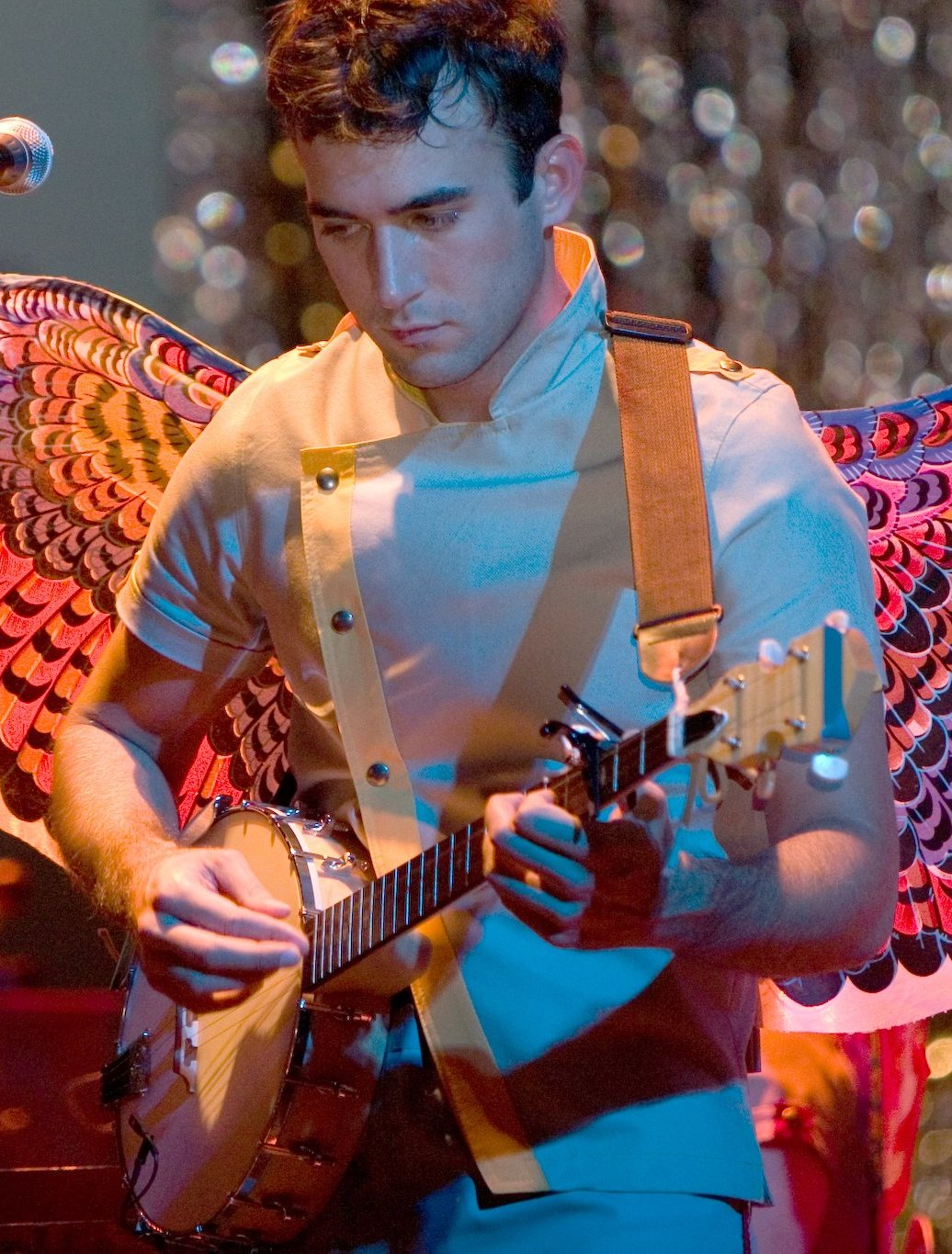
Sufjan Stevens contributed three songs to the film's soundtrack

== Critical reception ==
Professional ratings
Review scores
Source	Rating
Consequence of Sound	B+
Pitchfork	7.6/10

Call Me by Your Name: Original Motion Picture Soundtrack received positive reviews from music critics.

== Track listing ==
No.	Title	Writer(s)	Performer(s)	Length
1.	"Hallelujah Junction – 1st Movement"	John Adams	Rolf Hind, Nicolas Hodges	7:09
2.	"M.A.Y. in the Backyard"	Ryuichi Sakamoto	Ryuichi Sakamoto	4:25
3.	"J'adore Venise"	Ivano Fossati	Loredana Bertè	4:15
4.	"Paris Latino"	Carlos Perez; José Perez	Bandolero	4:01
5.	"Sonatine bureaucratique"	Erik Satie	Frank Glazer	3:44
6.	"Zion hört die Wächter singen" (from Cantata BWV 140, Wachet auf, ruft uns die Stimme)	Johann Sebastian Bach	Alessio Bax	5:10
7.	"Lady Lady Lady"	Giorgio Moroder; Keith Forsey	Giorgio Moroder; Joe Esposito	4:15
8.	"Une barque sur l'océan" (from Miroirs)	Maurice Ravel	André Laplante	7:10
9.	"Futile Devices" (Doveman Remix)	Sufjan Stevens	Sufjan Stevens	2:15
10.	"Germination"	Ryuichi Sakamoto	Ryuichi Sakamoto	2:09
11.	"Words"	Martin Kupersmith; Louis S. Yaguda; Robert Fitoussi	F. R. David	3:27
12.	"È la vita"	Marco Antonio Armenise; Paolo Armenise	Marco Armani	4:11
13.	"Mystery of Love"	Stevens	Sufjan Stevens	4:08
14.	"Radio Varsavia"	Franco Battiato; Giusto Pio	Battiato	4:07
15.	"Love My Way"	John Ashton; Tim Butler; Richard Butler; Vince Ely	The Psychedelic Furs	3:33
16.	"Le Jardin féerique" (from Ma mère l'Oye)	Maurice Ravel	Valéria Szervánszky; Ronald Cavaye	3:02
17.	"Visions of Gideon"	Stevens	Sufjan Stevens	4:08
Total length:				71:08

== Chart performance ==
The soundtrack debuted at number 18 on the UK Soundtrack Albums chart during the week of November 10, 2017. On March 3, 2018, it climbed to number 11, which became its peak position on the chart. It debuted at number 23 on the US Billboard Soundtrack Albums chart in the issue dated January 13, 2018, as the week's highest ranking debut. It became the greatest gainer in the following week, climbing to number 19. It peaked at number 14 on February 3, 2018.

Chart (2017–18)	Peak position
Belgian Albums (Ultratop Flanders)	46
Belgian Albums (Ultratop Wallonia)	190
French Albums (SNEP)	186
Italian Compilation Albums (FIMI)	5
South Korean International Albums (Circle)	28
Swiss Albums (Schweizer Hitparade)	76
UK Soundtrack Albums (Official Charts)	11
US Soundtrack Albums (Billboard)	14
US Vinyl Albums (Billboard)	10

== Certifications ==
Certifications
Region	Certification	Certified units/sales
Denmark (IFPI Danmark)	Gold	10,000^{‡}
^{‡} Sales+streaming figures based on certification alone.

== Release history ==
Region	Date	Edition(s)	Format(s)	Label	Ref.
Various	November 3, 2017	Standard	Digital download	Madison Gate Records and Sony Classical	
Various	November 17, 2017	Standard	CD	Madison Gate Records and Sony Classical	
Various	February 16, 2018	Standard	LP	Madison Gate Records and Sony Classical	
Various	August 3, 2018	Limited "peach season" edition	LP	Madison Gate Records and Sony Classical	
