= Futile Devices =

2010 song by Sufjan Stevens

Song by Sufjan Stevens

from the album The Age of Adz
- Released: October 12, 2010
- Length: 2:11
- Label: Asthmatic Kitty
- Songwriter: Sufjan Stevens
- Producer: Sufjan Stevens

"Futile Devices" is a song by American singer, songwriter, and multi-instrumentalist Sufjan Stevens. Originally a track from Stevens' sixth studio album, The Age of Adz, remixes of the song were released in 2012 and 2017, respectively. It was also featured in the 2017 film Call Me by Your Name.

== Background and composition ==
As the first track of The Age of Adz, "Futile Devices" is described as a combination of "piano and acoustic guitar" and "tippy-toed grace".

== Remixes and cover versions ==
The song was covered by American band Rituals of Mine (then-known as Sister Crayon) in 2011. A remix of "Futile Devices" by American musician Shigeto was released on February 29, 2012. The remix incorporates "bass-clouds and IDM clicks". In 2017, a new remix of the song by American producer Doveman was commissioned for the romantic drama film Call Me by Your Name. The film's director, Luca Guadagnino, specifically asked to include the song in the film. Doveman's remix was physically released on limited edition 10-inch vinyl in February 2018 alongside the songs "Mystery of Love" and "Visions of Gideon", all three of which were featured on the Call Me by Your Name soundtrack album.

== Critical reception ==
In his review of The Age of Adz for The Guardian, Alexis Petridis praised the song's "delicate guitar figure" as well as its "beautiful Simon and Garfunkel-ish melody". Also writing for The Guardian, Alexandra Pollard ranked the song eighth on a list of Stevens' ten best songs.

== Certifications ==
Certifications for "Futile Devices"
Region	Certification	Certified units/sales
France (SNEP) Doveman remix	Gold	100,000^{‡}
New Zealand (RMNZ) Doveman remix	Gold	15,000^{‡}
United Kingdom (BPI)	Silver	200,000^{‡}
^{‡} Sales+streaming figures based on certification alone.
