= Marco Armani =

Italian singer-songwriter and composer (born 1961)

- Born: Marco Antonio Armenise; 14 June 1961 (age 65); Bari, Italy
- Occupation: Singer-songwriter

Marco Antonio Armenise (born 14 June 1961), known professionally as Marco Armani, is an Italian singer-songwriter and composer.

== Life and career ==
In 1982, while still a student at the Conservatory of Bari, Armani debuted as a singer in the RAI musical contest Azzurro. In 1983, he entered the competition at the Sanremo Music Festival, where he ranked tenth with the song "È la vita". He participated at the Sanremo Festival four more times between 1984 and 1994.

His most successful song is "Solo con l'anima mia", which reached #25 on the Italian hit parade.

In 2017, his song "È la vita" was included on the original motion picture soundtrack for Call Me by Your Name.

== Discography ==
Albums

- 1985: Le cose che vanno lontano (Cinevox, SC 33/52)
- 1988: Molti volti (Cinevox, SC 3357)
- 1991: Posso pensare a te? (Fonit Cetra, LPX 276)
- 1994: Esser duri (Bubble Record, TCD – BLU 1845)
- 1997: 13 (BMG Ricordi, PPM - BMG RICORDI 74321500112)
- 1999: Il meglio (DV More Record CD DV 6395)
- 2007: Parlami d'amore (Cinevox, CD SC 74)
