= I, Tonya =

2017 film by Craig Gillespie

- Theatrical release poster
- Directed by: Craig Gillespie
- Written by: Steven Rogers
- Produced by: Tom Ackerley; Margot Robbie; Steven Rogers; Bryan Unkeless
- Starring: Margot Robbie; Sebastian Stan; Julianne Nicholson; Bobby Cannavale; Allison Janney
- Cinematography: Nicolas Karakatsanis
- Edited by: Tatiana S. Riegel
- Music by: Peter Nashel
- Production companies: AI Film; beIN Media Group; LuckyChap Entertainment; Clubhouse Pictures
- Distributed by: Neon; 30West
- Release dates: September 8, 2017 (TIFF); December 8, 2017 (United States)
- Running time: 120 minutes
- Countries: Qatar; United States
- Language: English
- Budget: $11 million
- Box office: $53.9 million

I, Tonya is a 2017 biographical comedy-drama sports film directed by Craig Gillespie and written by Steven Rogers. It follows the life and career of American figure skater Tonya Harding and her connection to the 1994 assault on her rival Nancy Kerrigan. The film states it is based on "contradictory" and "totally true" interviews with Harding and her ex-husband Jeff Gillooly, suggesting they are unreliable narrators. It features darkly comedic interviews with the characters, set in the modern day, and breaks the fourth wall. Margot Robbie (who also produced) stars as Harding, Sebastian Stan as Gillooly, and Allison Janney as Harding's mother LaVona Golden. Julianne Nicholson, Caitlin Carver, Paul Walter Hauser, and Bobby Cannavale also star.

Loosely based on actual events, the film depicts Harding as a victim, reframing the narrative around her implication in the aftermath of the crime and other criticism of her actions. I, Tonya premiered at the 2017 Toronto International Film Festival on September 8, and was released theatrically in the United States on December 8, 2017, by Neon and 30West. It grossed $53.9 million worldwide on an $6 million budget, and received highly positive reviews from critics, who particularly praised the performances of Robbie, Stan, and Janney.

At the 90th Academy Awards, Janney won for Best Supporting Actress, while the film also earned nominations for Best Actress for Robbie and Best Film Editing. It earned three nominations at the 75th Golden Globe Awards, winning Best Supporting Actress for Janney, who also won at the Screen Actors Guild and Critics' Choice Movie Awards. Robbie herself was nominated for Best Actress at both shows. At the 71st British Academy Film Awards, the film earned five nominations, winning Best Actress in a Supporting Role for Janney.

== Plot ==
In Portland, Oregon in the 1970s, a four-year-old Tonya Harding is forced to ice skate by her physically abusive mother, LaVona Golden. Tonya's parents eventually take her out of school to focus on her skating career as she trains under coach Diane Rawlinson. Tonya's father leaves the family home. Tonya rapidly becomes one of the best figure skaters in the United States, but is held back by her "white trash" reputation, homemade costumes, and unconventional choice of performance music (e.g., ZZ Top). At 15, she begins dating 18-year-old Jeff Gillooly. They marry, but Jeff becomes abusive. When LaVona scorns Tonya for putting up with it, Tonya blames LaVona for raising her badly.

After a dispute with Diane, Tonya fires her and hires Dody Teachman as her new coach. Tonya becomes the first American female figure skater to complete two triple Axel jumps in competition. At the 1992 Winter Olympics, Tonya fails to stick her landings and finishes fourth. Defeated, she takes a job as a waitress, but Diane convinces her to train for the 1994 Winter Olympics. She performs well but still feels she is being underscored. She confronts a judge about her scores, and he explains that Tonya's image is not wholesome enough. Tonya approaches her mother for help, but is scolded and rebuffed, leading Tonya to reluctantly ask Jeff for support. On the day of her November 1993 competition at the Northwest Pacific Regional Championships in Portland, Tonya receives a death threat and chooses not to compete. Realizing that he can sabotage Tonya's competition, Jeff instructs his friend Shawn Eckardt to send death threats to Tonya's rival, Nancy Kerrigan. Tonya makes a phone call trying to locate Nancy's training arena and her practice times. The idea of injuring Nancy to prevent her from competing is floated around by Tonya and Jeff, leading to Shawn hiring two henchmen to injure Nancy after a practice session in Detroit in January 1994. Shawn's henchman Shane Stant strikes Nancy's knee with a police baton, leaving her unable to compete at the next day's National competition. The hired henchmen are arrested.

Shawn's bragging quickly leads the FBI to him. He blames Jeff, who is horrified to learn that Shawn himself was behind Tonya's death threat to get hired as her bodyguard. Tonya qualifies for the Olympic team but realizes she will be found guilty by association. She goes to the FBI and reports what Jeff and Shawn did, but they show her interview transcript to Jeff after his surrender, and he races home to confront her. She briefly speaks to Jeff from behind a locked door, then climbs out the window, leaving him for good. Jeff later implicates Tonya by saying she knew beforehand about the attack.

LaVona visits Tonya and offers her kind words; however, when she asks if Tonya had prior knowledge of the attack, Tonya realizes that LaVona is wearing a wire and throws her out. Jeff, Shawn, and the henchmen are charged, and Tonya's hearing is postponed until after the Olympics. Tonya finishes eighth while Nancy wins the silver medal. Tonya avoids jail but is banned from competitive figure-skating for life. Heartbroken, she begs the judge to give her jail time instead of taking away her livelihood, but the decision stands.

Jeff acknowledges that he ruined Tonya's life and career. He changes his name, opens a hair salon, divorces Tonya, and remarries. LaVona moves to Washington and has no contact with Tonya. Tonya remarries, divorces, takes up professional boxing, then works as a landscaper, house painter, and deck builder. She since lives happily with her third husband and their seven-year-old son. Text at the end states that Tonya wants people to know that she is a good mother.

== Cast ==
- Margot Robbie as Tonya Harding
  - Mckenna Grace as young Tonya
  - Maizie Smith as four-year-old Tonya
- Sebastian Stan as Jeff Gillooly, Tonya's boyfriend, later ex-husband
- Allison Janney as LaVona Golden, Tonya's abusive and selfish mother
- Julianne Nicholson as Diane Rawlinson, Tonya's skating coach
- Caitlin Carver as Nancy Kerrigan, Tonya's skating rival and Olympic teammate, and the victim of the 1994 attack
- Bojana Novakovic as Dody Teachman, another of Tonya's coaches
- Paul Walter Hauser as Shawn Eckardt, Tonya's bodyguard and friend of Jeff
- Bobby Cannavale as Martin Maddox, a former reporter
- Dan Triandiflou as Bob Rawlinson, Diane's husband and Tonya's attorney
- Ricky Russert as Shane Stant, hired by Jeff and Shawn to attack Nancy
- Anthony Reynolds as Derrick Smith, Stant's uncle, prior friend of Shawn, first hired to attack Nancy before recruiting Stant himself to injure her
- Cassidy Balkcom as Oksana Baiul, competitor in the Winter Olympics (uncredited)
- Fi Dieter as Midori Ito (uncredited)

== Production ==
=== Development ===
Screenwriter Steven Rogers was inspired to write I, Tonya after watching a documentary on figure skating which mentioned Tonya Harding. Rogers arranged separate interviews with Harding and her ex-husband Jeff Gillooly; each remembered the events of the 1994 scandal very differently. Rogers decided, "Well, that's my way in - to put everyone's point of view out there, and then let the audience decide." He later said that the film was really about "things we tell ourselves in order to...live with ourselves...how we change the narrative, and then want that to be the narrative."

Regarding Gillooly, Rogers stated, "What's curious about Jeff is that he refused to take any money for life rights, for his interview, for anything." He remembered Jeff Gillooly saying that Harding was a great figure skater. According to Rogers, Gillooly also said that it was his own idea to threaten Nancy Kerrigan's ability to perform and took responsibility for his part in Harding's 1994 ruin: "he doesn't want to profit from it."

Margot Robbie, who played Harding and co-produced the film, did not realize the screenplay was based on a real event until after she finished reading it. Immediately prior to filming, Robbie flew from Los Angeles to Portland, Oregon to meet Harding. To prepare for the skating scenes, Robbie trained for four months. Heidi Munger and Anna Malkova served as skating doubles and Sarah Kawahara provided coaching and choreography. The production was unable to find a skating double who could perform a triple Axel, which was accomplished by visual effects.

Rogers wrote the role of Tonya's mother LaVona for Allison Janney; she is a longtime friend of Rogers, but the "stars had [not] aligned" for them to work together until he completed the script for I, Tonya. Janney said the part was one of the most challenging of her career. Shortly after the premiere at the Toronto International Film Festival, she said, "I think LaVona was actually a very smart woman, very articulate[...] She was not messing around and didn't want [Tonya] distracted[...] She wanted [Tonya] to know that it was going to be hard work, and knowing her daughter needed to be told she couldn't do it in order to do it was LaVona's way of saying, 'I was there to inspire her'."

Director Craig Gillespie was interested in the project because he "realized it was a great opportunity to revisit the story and make a commentary about how the media treats people." He added that he didn't "feel great about having to drag Nancy's name back into this." Gillespie said that he tried to present Harding "in a very honest way" without "trying to pull those heartstrings... just showing you why she is the way she is."

=== Filming ===
Principal photography began in late January 2017 in Macon, Georgia, where Macon Coliseum was used as a set. Throughout the shoot, Robbie suffered from a herniated disc in her neck and had routine MRIs to ensure it was safe for her to continue filming skating scenes. Filming wrapped in late February of that year, with pickups in Atlanta on May 16. In an interview, Margot Robbie highlighted that she and Tom Ackerley had to postpone their honeymoon for the production of I, Tonya.

=== Music ===
Some of the songs featured in I, Tonya had been used in Harding's real-life routines, such as ZZ Top's "Sleeping Bag". Others were selected by music supervisor Susan Jacobs: tracks from 1970s such as Fleetwood Mac's "The Chain" or Supertramp's "Goodbye Stranger" came from an era when music was "warm", "powerful and full." Jacobs felt the "classic rock songs filled the picture without getting in the way of the story." Critic Emily Manning found that others, such as En Vogue's "Free Your Mind" and Heart's "Barracuda", created "an interesting parallel between Tonya's tenacity and ambition." The film ends with Siouxsie and the Banshees' cover of "The Passenger"; Manning wrote: "There was something really right about seeing Tonya skate to Siouxsie." Jacobs said that "The Passenger" was "something obviously female and the lyrics [resonated]". The lyrics of Dire Straits' "Romeo and Juliet" were also important as "they felt like the story".

A soundtrack was released on December 8, 2017, by Milan Records, featuring songs used in the film by various artists and tracks from the original score.

Although he was not commissioned to write a song for the film, Sufjan Stevens sent his song "Tonya Harding" (2017) to Jacobs, but it was turned down because no way could be found for it to be used in the film.

== Release ==
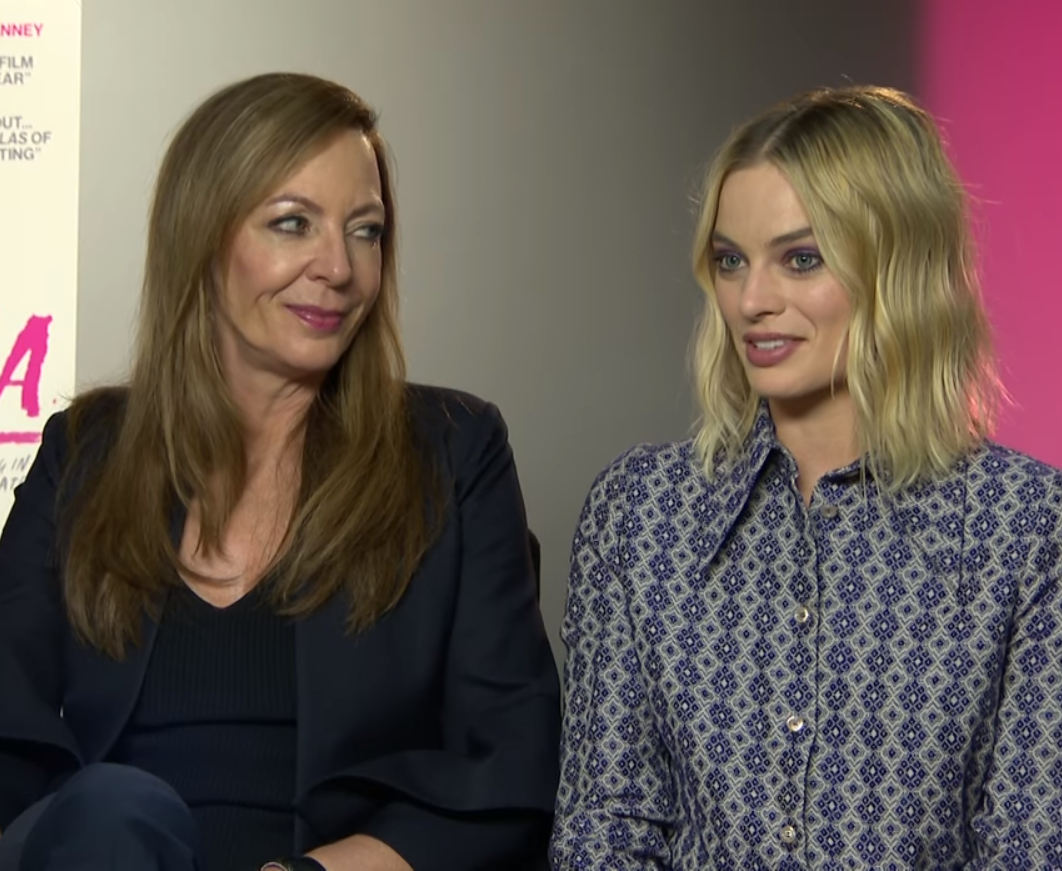
Allison Janney (left) and Margot Robbie (right) promoting the film

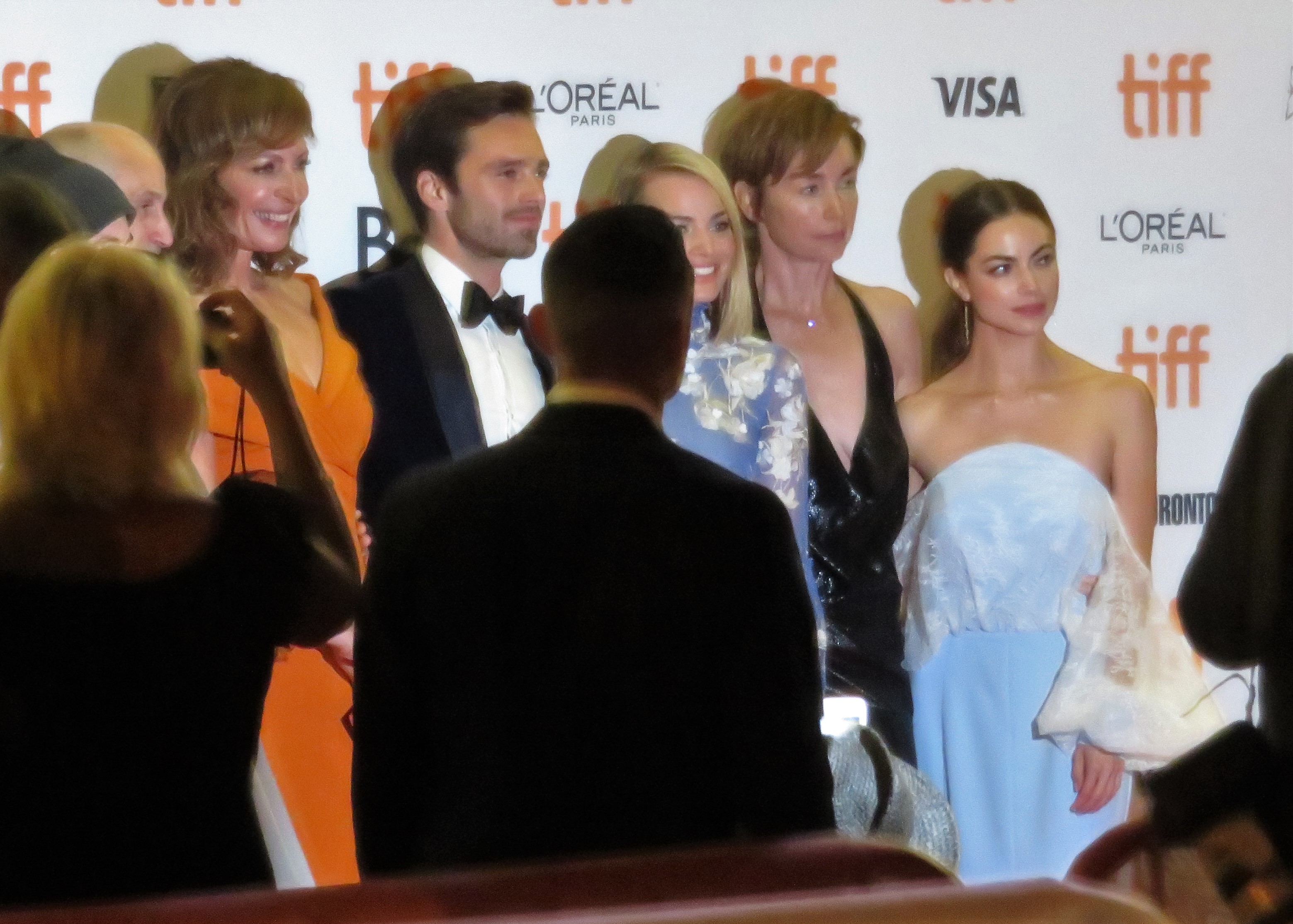
The cast of I, Tonya at the 2017 Toronto International Film Festival

Shortly before production on the film began, Miramax acquired U.S., Eastern European, Russian and Greek distribution rights to I, Tonya for $6 million and helped complete the film. Before the film's premiere, its distribution rights Miramax held were back on the market, with the company still attached to the film. I, Tonya premiered at the 2017 Toronto International Film Festival on September 8, 2017. A bidding war ensued for the domestic distribution rights to the film, with Netflix, Entertainment Studios, Annapurna Pictures, CBS Films and Aviron Pictures being some companies bidding for the film. Neon and 30West acquired domestic distribution rights to the film for $5 million. It was theatrically released on December 8, 2017.

In January 2018, Dan Shaughnessy, columnist for The Boston Globe, asked Nancy Kerrigan in a telephone interview if she had seen the film – she had not. When Shaughnessy posited that Kerrigan was once "a victim of Harding's dysfunctional life", she agreed but emphasized that she was occupied with living her own life. Shaughnessy also asked Kerrigan to comment on whether she was "bothered by Hollywood's portrayal of Tonya"; she replied that the issue was no longer her business. Nancy Kerrigan said that her only "role" in the 1994 scandal was recovering from an attack, "That's it", she finished. She went on, during the interview, to speak about how she remembered the scandal as "A bizarre thing. The whole thing was crazy, being that it's a story. I mean, come on."

=== Home media ===
The film was released on DVD and Blu-ray on March 13, 2018.

== Reception ==
=== Box office ===
I, Tonya has grossed $30 million in the United States and Canada, and $23.9 million in other territories, for a worldwide total of $53.9 million.

After making $11.6 million over a month in limited release, the film made $2.9 million from 799 theaters in its wide weekend. After the film earned its three Oscar nominations, it was added to 161 theaters the following week and made $3 million.

=== Critical response ===
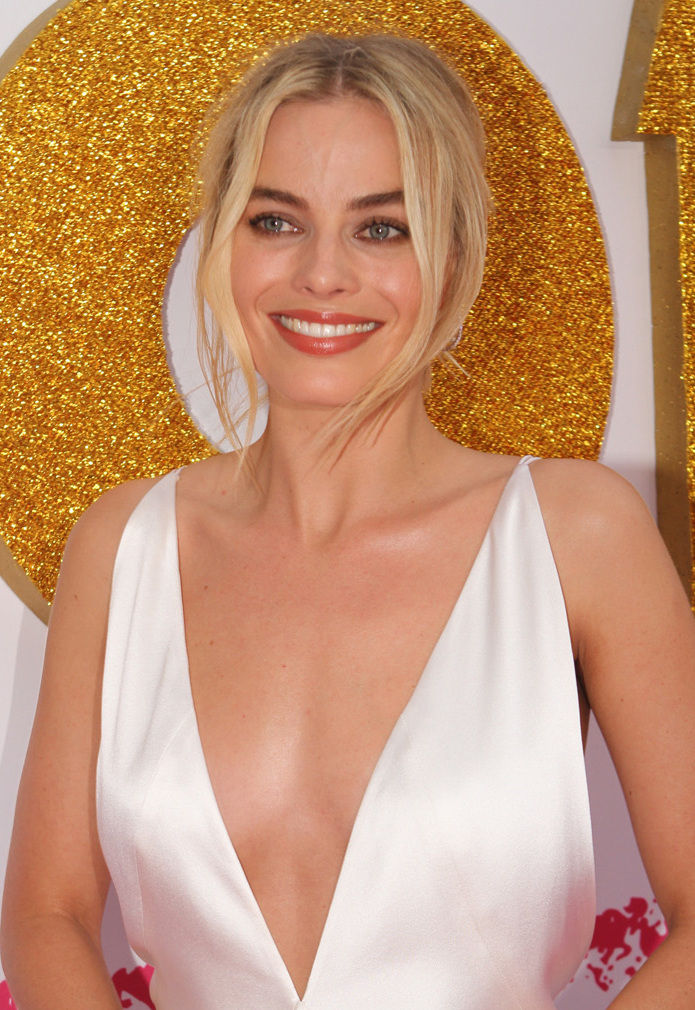
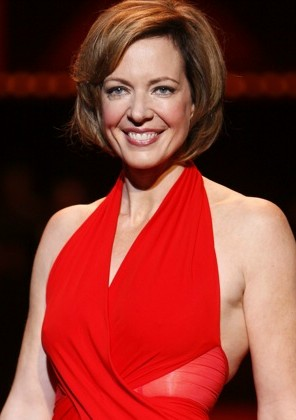
The performances of Margot Robbie and Allison Janney garnered widespread critical acclaim, earning them Academy Award nominations for Best Actress and Best Supporting Actress respectively, with Janney winning her category.

On review aggregator Rotten Tomatoes, I, Tonya holds an approval rating of 90% based on 384 reviews, with an average rating of 7.80/10. The website's critical consensus reads: "Led by strong work from Margot Robbie and Allison Janney, I, Tonya finds the humor in its real-life story without losing sight of its more tragic – and emotionally resonant – elements." On Metacritic, which assigns a rating to reviews, the film has a weighted average score of 77 out of 100, based on 47 critics, indicating "generally favorable" reviews.

Christy Lemire of RogerEbert.com described it as "an irresistible, soapy mix of jealousy, competition and class warfare, fortified by powerful performances and unexpected emotional resonance." Lemire also complimented Gillespie for "what would seem to be an impossible high-wire act: He's made a movie that's affectionately mocking—of this theatrical sport, of the idiots who surrounded Harding, of this hideous moment in fashion and pop culture—without actually mocking Harding herself." In Rolling Stone, Peter Travers wrote that the film holds "a mirror up to the class-conscious America most of us tend to ignore or dismiss – and makes us see ourselves reflected in it, too. I, Tonya is funny as hell, but the pain is just as real. You'll laugh till it hurts." Angelica Jade Bastién of Vulture praised Robbie's performance, feeling she had found a new "weight".

Ty Burr of The Boston Globe wrote that it was one of the most surprising films of the year - a "multi-layered saga of talent and class resentment". He praised Rogers' script as "sympathetic but clear-eyed, foul-mouthed but fair-minded". Burr wrote that the domestic abuse scenes are presented effectively because of the film's style of "ironic as-told-to comedy that intentionally curdles when the extent of [violence]...and Harding's grim acceptance...of it become obvious". However, when writing of the scene where Harding voices how she has internalized a victim-like identity, Burr believed the filmmakers failed to appreciate the scope of what that really means to her. He considered whether the filmmakers had an obligation not to be among "the many vultures picking at [Tonya's] pop-culture corpse". Burr did not think the filmmakers properly addressed the predicament of making a film about Harding's media over-exposure.

Richard Brody of The New Yorker felt the film failed to find an original depiction of the working class, and "treats Tonya's background, her tastes, her habits, her way of talking, as a joke... The result is a film that's as derisive and dismissive toward Tonya Harding as it shows the world at large to have been". In The Guardian, Jean Hannah Edelstein felt that the film was "played for laughs" at the expense of its subject.

Allison Janney was widely lauded for her performance as LaVona Golden, singled out for praise by critics. Lemire of RogerEbert.com said: "Janney absolutely tears it up as the profane, chain-smoking LaVona Harding, constantly insulting Tonya and messing with her mind in the name of making her a champion. It's a showy, scenery-chewing performance but it's not one-note; Janney brings an undercurrent of sorrow to the part in revealing LaVona's twisted methodology." Michael O'Sullivan of The Washington Post wrote, "Janney steals every scene she's in, playing LaVona, a harridan whose nodding goes beyond tough love." Helen O'Hara from Empire called Janney's performance flawless and flamboyant, and an unforgettable one. Brian Truitt of USA Today said, "Janney is magnificent as Tonya Harding's villainous and abusive mommy dearest. No curse word goes unused and no scenery is left unchewed by the actress, who takes over whenever she's onscreen, whether dealing with a pesky parakeet or breaking the fourth wall."

The film received some criticism for taking liberties with facts in order to make Harding sympathetic. Reviewing the film for USA Today, Christine Brennan, who covered the real story in 1994, wrote that "the movie certainly doesn't worry about letting facts get in the way of a good story or bother to tell you that the only person Tonya has to blame...is herself." In the Sonoma Index-Tribune and The Oregonian, J.E. Vader, who covered Harding's rise as a local up-and-coming hero, wrote a scathing review titled "I, Nauseated", in which she accuses Harding of being an "unrepentant felon" and "habitually 'truth challenged'", adding that "this fantasy film is Harding's dream come true".

== Accolades ==
I, Tonya earned various awards and nominations following its release. At the 7th AACTA International Awards, Robbie won Best Actress, while Janney won Best Supporting Actress. I, Tonya received five nominations at the 71st British Academy Film Awards, including Best Actress in a Leading Role for Robbie, Best Original Screenplay for Rogers and winning Best Actress in a Supporting Role for Janney. The film also garnered five Critics' Choice Movie Awards, with Robbie winning Best Actress in a Comedy and Janney winning Best Supporting Actress.

At the 75th Golden Globe Awards, Janney received the Golden Globe Award for Best Supporting Actress – Motion Picture, while the film was nominated for Best Motion Picture – Musical or Comedy and Robbie was nominated for Best Actress in a Motion Picture – Musical or Comedy I, Tonya gathered three Independent Spirit Awards nominations, and a Producers Guild of America Award nomination. Robbie and Janney were nominated for Outstanding Performance by a Female Actor in a Leading Role and Outstanding Performance by a Female Actor in a Supporting Role respectively at the 24th Screen Actors Guild Awards. Rogers earned a nomination for Best Original Screenplay from the Writers Guild of America. Tatiana S. Riegel won the American Cinema Editors Award for Best Edited Film (Comedy or Musical).

At the 90th Academy Awards, Janney won Best Supporting Actress. Robbie earned a nomination for Best Actress and Tatiana S. Riegel earned a nomination for Best Film Editing.
