= Mystery of Love =

- Cover art for 10" single

Single by Sufjan Stevens

from the album Call Me by Your Name: Original Motion Picture Soundtrack
- B-side: "Visions of Gideon"; "Futile Devices" (Doveman Remix)
- Released: 1 December 2017
- Genre: Acoustic
- Length: 4:08
- Label: Self-released
- Songwriter: Sufjan Stevens
- Producer: Thomas Bartlett

Sufjan Stevens singles chronology
"Venus" (2017)	"Mystery of Love" (2017)	"Tonya Harding" (2017)

Music video
- "Mystery of Love" on YouTube

"Mystery of Love" is a song written and performed by American singer-songwriter Sufjan Stevens and produced by Thomas Bartlett. It was self-released digitally, under license to Madison Gate Records and Sony Classical, on 1 December 2017. Luca Guadagnino, director of the 2017 film Call Me by Your Name, approached the singer to contribute to the film as a narrator, but Stevens declined and agreed to record an original song instead. Stevens was granted full creative control during the songwriting process and received inspiration from the film's script and André Aciman's novel of the same name. An acoustic ballad, the lyrics describe romance and allude to the relationship between film characters Elio and Oliver. They also make several references to the state of Oregon, birds, and Christianity.

A music video for the track was released on 4 January 2018, on Pitchfork's YouTube channel. It contains clips from the film and footage of artwork recorded at the National Archaeological Museum in Naples. The song was featured in the trailer for the movie and during a scene in the film where Elio and Oliver go hiking in Bergamo. It was featured on the film's official soundtrack in addition to two other Stevens-penned songs ("Futile Devices" and "Visions of Gideon"). Critical response to the song was generally positive.

"Mystery of Love" was nominated for awards at several ceremonies, including the Critics' Choice Movie Awards, Georgia Film Critics Association, and Guild of Music Supervisors Awards. It was also nominated by the Academy of Motion Picture Arts and Sciences for the Academy Award for Best Original Song. The song also received a nomination for the Grammy Award for Best Song Written for Visual Media at the 61st ceremony. Commercially, "Mystery of Love" entered Billboard's Hot Rock Songs chart in the United States and reached the main record charts in France, Hungary, Portugal, and Scotland.

== Concept and development ==
"I wanted to work on a contribution from the standpoint of music that could give the film a precise identity that was going to go beyond the philologic aspect of the '80s and the commentary music of the classical music. And that's why I was seeking a voice to add itself to the voices of the film – played by the actors playing the characters – and that's when I thought of Sufjan Stevens."

— Luca Guadagnino discussing his decision to work with Sufjan Stevens for Call Me by Your Name.

"Mystery of Love" was written by Sufjan Stevens. In an interview, film director and producer Luca Guadagnino said that although he normally selects the music for his films himself, he wanted to find an "emotional narrator to the film" through music. He also wanted the music to feel connected to main character Elio Perlman, a young pianist who enjoys transcribing and adapting musical pieces in order to get close to his love interest, Oliver. Describing the process as challenging due to Stevens being a "very reserved person as an artist", Guadagnino eventually convinced him to create music for the film and supplied him the script and André Aciman's novel, which served as the basis for the film, for inspiration. Stevens was also inspired after partaking in conversation with Guadagnino about the story's plot and characters. Stevens was given complete creative control while songwriting, which he was grateful for. He also thanked Guadagnino's willingness to trust others for the opportunity. Although he had only been asked to pen one song for Call Me by Your Name, Stevens offered Guadagnino two ("Mystery of Love" and "Visions of Gideon"), which were both used.

The Hollywood Reporter first reported on Stevens' involvement with the film's soundtrack in January 2017. Although Stevens had declined a voiceover role in the film, Guadagnino jokingly called the singer the narrator of the movie, saying that he fulfilled "a sort of narrator that could make justice of the book [and] of the film, [as] drawn from the narrative of Elio". "Mystery of Love" was first teased in the trailer for Call Me by Your Name, which premiered on 1 August 2017. Stevens contributed to a total of three songs on the soundtrack: "Mystery of Love", "Visions of Gideon", and a remix of his 2010 song "Futile Devices", which originally appeared on his sixth studio album The Age of Adz. His work on Call Me by Your Name marks Stevens' first contributions to a feature film soundtrack. The film's soundtrack was released on 3 November 2017, by Madison Gate Records, whereas "Mystery of Love" was self-released as a single on 1 December 2017, to digital platform hubs such as the iTunes Store, under license to Madison Gate Records and Sony Classical.

In February 2018, it was announced that "Mystery of Love" would be physically released on limited edition 10" vinyl as part of the special releases for Record Store Day in the United States. In addition to new cover art taken from the film, the single was paired with A-side and B-side tracks "Visions of Gideon" and the Doveman remix of "Futile Devices". The shipment of vinyl was limited to 10,000 copies and each vinyl sleeve was individually labeled.

In March 2025, on the tenth anniversary of Stevens' album Carrie & Lowell (2015), a previously unreleased demo version of "Mystery of Love" was released. It served to mark the announcement of an anniversary deluxe edition of the album. The song was originally conceptualized during the album's recording sessions, before being reworked for the Call Me By Your Name soundtrack.

== Composition and lyrical interpretation ==
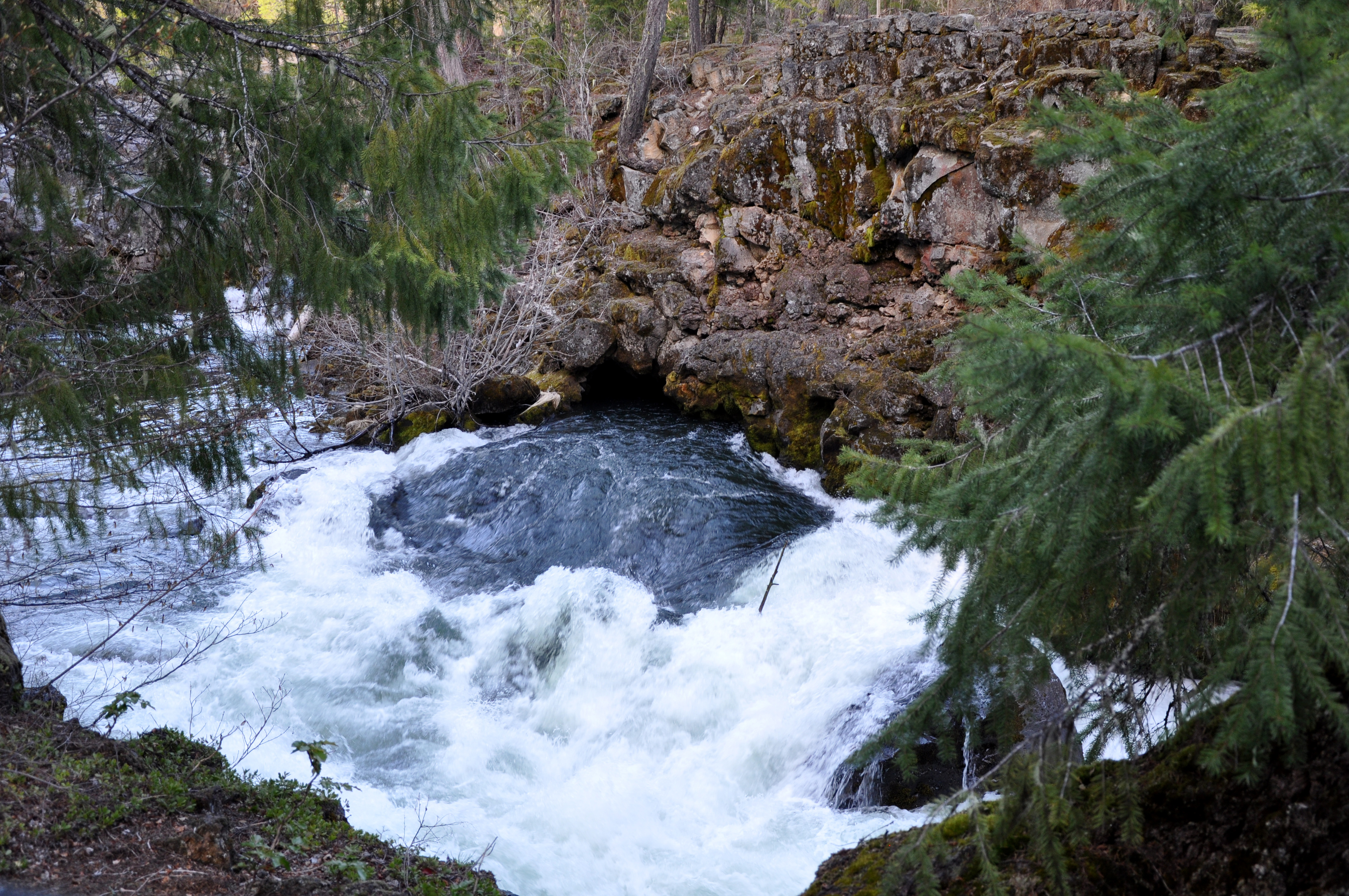
Stevens wrote "Mystery of Love" while in Oregon and references the state's Rogue River.

"Mystery of Love" is an acoustic song that lasts four minutes and eight seconds. It is composed in the key of G major using common time and a tempo of 108 beats per minute. Instrumentation is provided by strings, a mandolin, a guitar, and a piano. Three reviewers from North by Northwestern felt that Stevens' songs "capture [a] sense of intimacy" that alludes to the film's themes of mythology. Alex Robert Ross from Noisey wrote that the track contains a "delicate, plucked-guitar" beat. The Daily Californian's Anagha Komaragiri described it as "light and airy". Daniel Mergarry, a writer for Gay Times, called "Mystery of Love" the "more hopeful" of Stevens' two songs, and David Bauder from Albany Times Union called the track a "lovely, ethereal ballad".

On the track, Stevens' vocal range spans from the low note of D_{3} to the high note of E_{4}. Guadagnino considered Stevens' vocals to be crystal and equated them to that of an angel. Noisey's Alex Robert Ross noted that he sings in a "semi-whisper". Stevens considered the creation of both "Mystery of Love" and "Visions of Gideon" to be easy as they are lyrically about "love and loss", which he has used as the basis for songwriting since he was a child. The song opens with Stevens singing the first verse, the lyrics including "Oh, to see without my eyes / The first time that you kissed me". Brandon Tensley from Pacific Standard noted the lyrics, "The first time that you touched me / Oh, will wonders ever cease?", to describe the complicated relationship between Elio and Oliver. In the third iteration of the chorus, the lyrics change to "The last time that you touched me" after Stevens asks "How much sorrow can I take?" in the previous verse, referencing "how a gnawing emptiness smacks into [Elio and Oliver's] initial bliss once summer ends". According to Ivan Raykoff from Oxford University Press' OUPblog, the song "describes the communicative power of touch over vision" and the potential to find both comfort and pain in nostalgia.

Joe Utichi from Deadline Hollywood noted references to the state of Oregon in "Mystery of Love", which Stevens had previously experimented with in Carrie & Lowell. Stevens mentions Rogue River during a verse, which is both a waterway and town in the state. In an interview, the singer confirmed Utichi's claim and explained that "Mystery of Love" was written in Oregon while touring for his album. Other references in the song are to birds, which Stevens claims represents "absolute freedom and transcendence". Sam Eichner from UrbanDaddy noted themes of Christianity in the lyrics, saying that "'Mystery of Love,' in particular – ha[s] a spiritual bent, exalting the feeling to the realm of the divine".

== Critical reception ==
Chicago Tribune's Michael Phillips praised "Mystery of Love" and "Visions of Gideon" for being "piercing original songs" and found them to help the viewer find sympathy with understanding Elio's emotions. Elliot Kronsberg from North by Northwestern enjoyed "Mystery of Love" the most out of Stevens' three contributions, stating: "I got so excited when it was on and it’s been stuck in my head for almost a week." Hannah Fleming, a writer for Paste, felt that the song "solidifies Stevens as a kind of modern Shakespeare sonneteer", while the staff at Vanity Fair described it as "heartfelt". The Daily Campus's Abby Brone praised the song's ability to "accentuate the captivating quality of the film". In a column for Mint, Sanjor Narayan discussed her favorite songs by Stevens and listed "Mystery of Love" as one of five tracks for readers to listen to. Bill Pearis from BrooklynVegan criticized the track for not "breaking any new ground" but called its sound "very much welcome". He compared its musical direction to the style Stevens featured on his studio albums Seven Swans (2004) and Carrie & Lowell (2015).

=== Accolades ===
Several music critics suggested that Stevens would receive award nominations for his work on the track. Larry Fitzmaurice from Vice predicted that both "Mystery of Love" and "Visions of Gideon" were strong enough for Golden Globe nominations. Entertainment Tonight's Stacy Lambe wrote that they "make Stevens a dark horse contender for the Oscars’ Best Original Song category". Glenn Whipp from Los Angeles Times agreed and called it a "good bet" for being a contender. At the 23rd Critics' Choice Awards, "Mystery of Love" received a nomination for Best Song, but lost to "Remember Me" from the 2017 animated film Coco. The song was up in the same category at awards from the Georgia Film Critics Association, but also lost to "Remember Me". In the Best Song/Recording Created for a Film category at the Guild of Music Supervisors Awards, "Mystery of Love" was selected as one of the five nominees. At the 90th Academy Awards, both "Mystery of Love" and "Visions of Gideon" were shortlisted as two of seventy contenders for the Best Original Song category. The former choice was ultimately nominated and is Stevens' first nomination in the category. Albany Times Union's David Bauder called "Mystery of Love" the "outlier among the nominees, at least stylistically". Ultimately, the award went to "Remember Me" from Coco. "Mystery of Love" also received a nomination for Best Song Written for Visual Media at the 61st Annual Grammy Awards, thus becoming Stevens's first Grammy Award nomination. It won the David di Donatello for Best Original Song in March 2019.

== Commercial performance ==
In the United States, "Mystery of Love" entered the Hot Rock & Alternative Songs chart compiled by Billboard, which tracks digital download sales, streaming data, and radio airplay for rock songs over all formats and determines the most successful ones. During the issue dating 20 January 2018, the single debuted at number 47, becoming Stevens' first and only appearance on the chart. Following Stevens' performance of “Mystery of Love” during the Academy Awards, it garnered 129,000 on-demand audio streams, up 60 percent compared to the day prior, when it received 80,000 plays. Among the five nominees, "Mystery of Love" was the greatest gainer in terms of daily streams. During the week of 17 March, it peaked at number 13. It also reached the Alternative Songs digital component chart in the US, reaching number 6. "Mystery of Love" also entered the record charts in three European countries. It reached number 44 on France's SNEP chart, peaked at number 34 on the Hungarian Single Top 40 list, and entered Portugal's AFP chart at number 93.

== Promotion and music video ==
"Mystery of Love" is featured in the official trailer for Call Me by Your Name and during a scene in the film where Elio and Oliver go hiking in Bergamo. As part of his nomination for the Academy Award for Best Song, Stevens was invited to perform "Mystery of Love" at the awards ceremony, which took place on 4 March 2018. He was joined onstage by fellow musicians Chris Thile, Moses Sumney, and St. Vincent. While on stage, he wore a custom Gucci pink and purple-striped tuxedo, embossed with blue dragons. Stevens told reporters at the show that he had never worn a tuxedo prior to his live performance. The song also appears in the episode titled "What Have They Done?" of HBO's Big Little Lies, aired on 9 June 2019.

A music video for "Mystery of Love" was uploaded onto Pitchfork's YouTube channel on 4 January 2018. The video featured scenes from the film and new footage captured at the National Archaeological Museum in Naples. Lauren O'Neill from Noisey lauded the video, called it a collection of "the film's most iconic moments", and claimed that "the whole package [is] sure to make you misty eyed". She also noted that the clip focused on common symbols and images from the movie, such as "peaches, swimming, [and the] Italian countryside". The Film Stage's Jordan Raup described the video as "a beautiful ode to one of 2017's best romances".

== Track listings and formats ==
- Digital download/promotional CD single/streaming
  1. "Mystery of Love" – 4:08
- 10" single
  - A1. "Mystery of Love" – 4:08
  - B1. "Visions of Gideon" – 4:07
  - B2. "Futile Devices" (Doveman Remix) – 2:15

== Charts ==
Chart performance for "Mystery of Love"
Chart (2018)	Peak position
France (SNEP)	44
Hungary (Single Top 40)	34
Portugal (AFP)	93
Scottish Singles Sales (Official Charts)	67
UK Singles Sales (OCC)	63
US Hot Rock & Alternative Songs (Billboard)	13

== Certifications ==
Certifications for "Mystery of Love"
Region	Certification	Certified units/sales
Denmark (IFPI Danmark)	Gold	45,000^{‡}
France (SNEP)	Diamond	333,333^{‡}
Italy (FIMI)	Gold	35,000^{‡}
Poland (ZPAV)	Platinum	50,000^{‡}
Spain (Promusicae)	Gold	30,000^{‡}
United Kingdom (BPI)	Gold	400,000^{‡}
United States (RIAA)	Platinum	1,000,000^{‡}
^{‡} Sales+streaming figures based on certification alone.

== Release history ==
Release dates and formats for "Mystery of Love"
Region	Date	Format(s)	Label(s)	Ref.
Various	1 December 2017	Digital download; streaming	Self-released	
United States	2017	Promotional CD single	Sony Classical	
United States	21 April 2018	10"	Music on Vinyl	
