= Assault of Nancy Kerrigan =

American competitive figure skating scandal

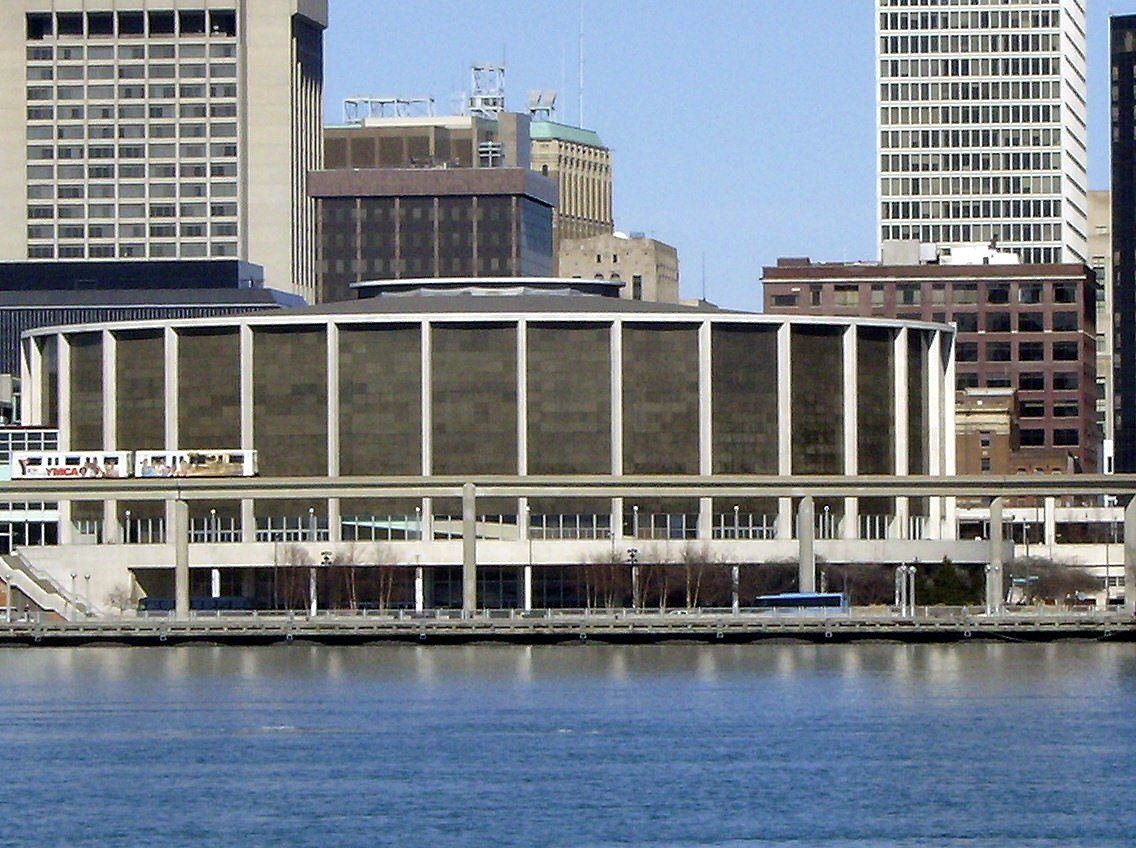
- Cobo Arena, the site of the attack, pictured in 2007
- Location: 42°19′35″N 83°2′49″W; Cobo Arena; Detroit, Michigan, U.S.
- Date: January 6, 1994; 32 years ago c. 14:35 (EST (UTC−05:00))
- Target: Nancy Kerrigan
- Attack type: Bludgeoning
- Weapon: ASP telescopic baton
- Injuries: Nancy Kerrigan
- Perpetrators: Jeff Gillooly; Shawn Eckardt; Derrick Smith
- Assailant: Shane Stant
- Accused: Tonya Harding
- Charges: Racketeering; Conspiracy; Hindering prosecution
- Litigation: Harding v. US Figure Skating Ass'n, 851 F. Supp. 1476 (D. Or. 1994)

On January 6, 1994, Nancy Kerrigan, an American figure skater, was struck on the lower right thigh with a baton by assailant Shane Stant as she walked down a corridor in Cobo Arena in Detroit, Michigan, United States. Kerrigan had been practicing skating on an ice rink in the arena shortly beforehand. The attack happened at around 14:35 (2:35 PM) Eastern Standard Time.

The attack was planned by Jeff Gillooly, the ex-husband of fellow American figure skater Tonya Harding, and his co-conspirator Shawn Eckardt; they both admitted guilt to police and were convicted. They hired Stant and his uncle Derrick Smith to carry out the attack. Gillooly and Eckardt both claimed that Harding was involved in the attack and had knowledge of it beforehand. Harding initially denied all knowledge of the attack, but soon accepted a plea agreement admitting to helping cover up the attack after the fact. Later, both a grand jury and a disciplinary panel from the United States Figure Skating Association (USFSA) found further evidence of Harding's involvement during the planning and execution phases. Despite this, Harding has always denied involvement and was not convicted of any crime in connection with this incident.

The attack was intended to prevent Kerrigan from taking part in the ongoing 1994 United States Figure Skating Championships and the forthcoming Winter Olympics, thus increasing the prospects of Harding in both figure skating events. Kerrigan could not compete in the US Championship but recovered in time to compete in the Winter Olympics. Both women competed in the 1994 Olympics; Harding was banned for life from USFSA figure skating events as a result of the attack later that year. The incident and its aftermath were covered extensively by national and some international media. The attack also had an effect on American popular culture, notably being dramatized in the 2017 film I, Tonya.

== Background ==
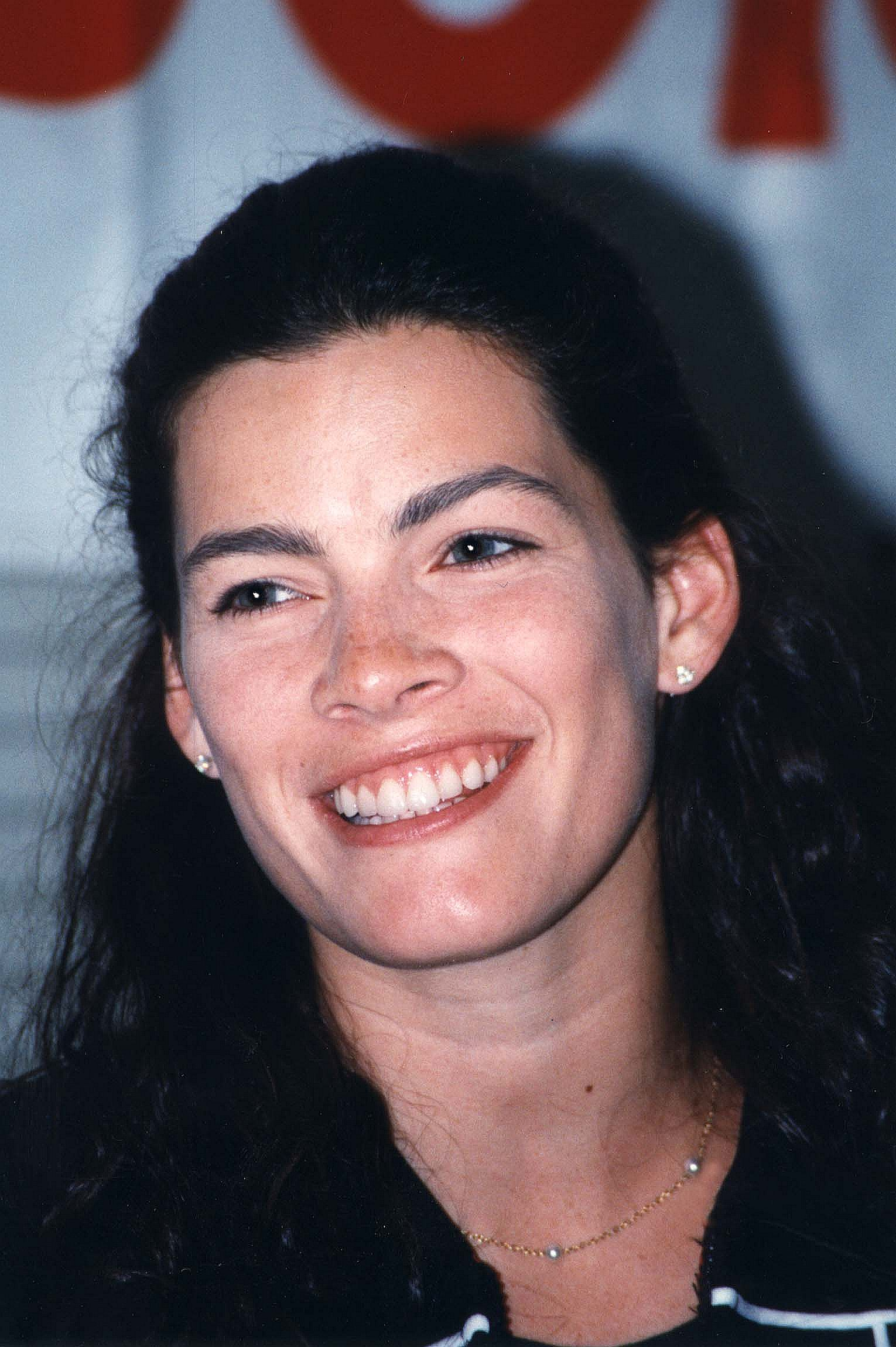
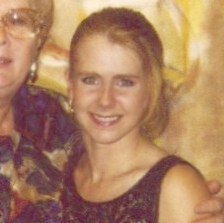
Figure skaters Nancy Kerrigan (left, 1995) and Tonya Harding (right, 1994)

Nancy Kerrigan is an American former figure skater who, in January 1994, was about to take part in the United States Figure Skating Championships in Detroit, Michigan. Her main rival in that tournament was Tonya Harding. The attack took place just days before the tournament, and rendered Kerrigan unable to take part. The Winter Olympics were also set to take place in February, where Kerrigan and Harding were likely to be the two female figure skaters representing the United States. The attack benefited Harding as it allowed her to win the U.S. Championships with ease and could have benefited her if it had taken Kerrigan out of the Olympics.

Jeff Gillooly was Tonya Harding's ex-husband. At the time of the attack, the couple were together and still referred to each other as husband and wife. Shawn Eckardt, a friend of Gillooly's who was also Harding's bodyguard before the attack, had originally been hired by the figure skater after she received an anonymous death threat. Shane Stant later testified that Harding was part of staging the death threat against herself. Derrick Smith, an associate of Eckardt, was paid $6,500 to carry out the attack; Eckardt had received the money from Gillooly. Shane Stant, Smith's nephew, initially planned to carry out the attack by himself and had travelled to Kerrigan's home rink in Cape Cod in late December 1993, but was unable to locate her. Stant then followed Kerrigan to the Nationals in Detroit in early January 1994. Gillooly opposed carrying out an attack in Detroit, feeling it too likely they would be caught, and instructed Eckardt to wire Stant funds to return home without carrying out the attack. Eckardt instead wired the funds to Smith, who then traveled to join Stant in Detroit. Stant and Smith then planned to carry out the attack together.

== Attack ==
On the afternoon of January 6, 1994, Kerrigan was practicing for the U.S. Championships on an ice rink inside Cobo Arena. A camera crew was recording her practice session and showed her leaving the ice rink and walking through a curtain and down a hallway; the camera then cuts out. Stant stated in a 2018 interview that he was standing "about a foot and a half" (around half a meter) behind the camera crew and waited for them to stop filming before he followed Kerrigan through the curtain.

Stant approached Kerrigan from behind, extended a telescopic baton, struck her lower right thigh and walked away. He then escaped from the arena by smashing through a locked glass door. Smith was waiting in a car outside and acted as a getaway driver. The camera crew began recording again shortly after the attack and recorded Kerrigan sitting on the floor crying surrounded by arena staff. Here, Kerrigan exclaimed, with tears, the now famous line, "Why? Why? Why?". (Note: Some newspapers, such as the New York Daily News, misquoted Kerrigan as saying "Why me!?". This sentence cannot be heard on the clip filmed by the camera crew. The phrase she said is "Why? Why? Why?" while crying.) This footage was later broadcast around the world in news programs. Kerrigan was then carried away to a changing room by her father. The attack severely bruised her knee and quadriceps tendon and forced her to withdraw from the U.S. Championships.

== Criminal investigation and testimonies ==
=== Harding and Gillooly's relationship ===
Harding met Jeff Gillooly in 1986 when she was skating at the Clackamas Town Center; she was 15, he was 17. They later exchanged phone numbers and went out to the movies, chaperoned by her father. In 1988, the couple moved into a home together, and Harding claimed she began experiencing physical abuse from Gillooly. They married on March 18, 1990. Harding's mother, LaVona, said she opposed the marriage: "I knew Jeff had a violent streak [...] he tried to break down the door because he thought [Tonya] had gone out with another boy." On June 17, 1991, Harding filed for divorce, citing irreconcilable differences. Two days later, she received a restraining order against Gillooly: "He wrenched my arm and wrist, pulled my hair and shoved me [...] he bought a shotgun, and I am scared for my safety."

Harding later claimed she was the victim of acquaintance rape sometime during her separation from Gillooly in 1991, "by a friend of mine, who I knew for eight years." In summer 1991, she became engaged to mechanical engineer Mike Pliska. He ended their engagement after he saw Harding disrespecting people and giving her phone number to another man. In autumn 1991, Harding dated a Canadian banker. In October, she decided to reconcile with Gillooly and withdraw the divorce, saying they were still in love and seeking counseling: "I know he's changed. I see it in his eyes, and I believe in him... I don't want to lose him. I really don't."

On March 10, 1992, Harding had a roadside physical altercation with a female motorist in Portland, Oregon. The first deputy on the scene observed Harding holding a baseball bat after breaking the motorist's eyeglasses. The incident ended in apologies and no criminal charges were filed.

In both March and July 1993, police came to Harding and Gillooly's shared apartment after reported arguments. In a July affidavit, Harding wrote that she had been in an abusive marriage for two years, "he has assaulted me physically with his open hand and fist [...] put me down to the floor on several occasions." Harding was granted another restraining order and filed for divorce. In spring 1993, she dated Tom Arant who spoke about Harding to The Oregonian, saying she would complain about Gillooly, yet still contacted him often: "she couldn't stop talking to him." That summer, a man from Harding's gym claimed to The Oregonian that Harding offered to pay him to "take care" of Gillooly, "slap him around a little." He said he was offended and declined.

On August 28, 1993, Harding and Gillooly were granted a divorce. Ten days later, Harding's lawyer asked the restraining order to be lifted because the couple again wished to reconcile. On October 2, at approximately 3 a.m., neighbours of the couple called the police when they heard them arguing outside and a single gunshot. The neighbours reported seeing Gillooly pick Harding up and place her in a truck, and feared Harding had been shot. A police officer stopped the truck and confiscated a found shotgun and a 9mm Beretta pistol that had recently been discharged. The officer then interviewed Harding and Gillooly separately about what had happened, but their stories did not match. Gillooly first stated that the gun had fired when he was carrying it. Harding then admitted that she had fired the gun and was worried about the publicity. Gillooly said that Harding had been moving her possessions into his truck when they started an argument over his former girlfriend; he declined to press charges. In November 1993, the couple were evicted from their apartment for failing to pay rent.

=== Harding's FBI testimony and other claims ===
During Tonya Harding's FBI testimony on January 18, 1994, she requested and received some ice to treat her swollen ankle. When asked about her finances, Harding said she had one bank account which was currently $109 overdrawn. She was also asked about her relationship with Gillooly and replied she still considered him her husband. When asked whether Gillooly had ever threatened her, Harding said he had not. FBI agent James Russell then asked if she was at Shawn Eckardt's house at any time on January 11, Harding replied that she "definitely" had not been. Russell then advised her that while concealing criminal knowledge did not violate Oregon law, lying to the FBI would violate federal law. Harding said she understood that. Russell then told her that he knew she had lied to him. Harding's lawyer, Robert Weaver, then stated he wished to speak privately with his client. When Harding returned, she testified that she and Gillooly went to Eckardt's home on December 28, 1993; he went inside, she drove away. Harding said that Gillooly phoned her one hour later asking her to pick him up.

After Harding's plea deal on March 16, 1994, she has since made other claims about the assault scandal. In 2018, she said she had prior knowledge of Gillooly and Eckardt discussing "[taking] out" one of her competitors in late 1993. Harding said she protested that she wanted to win fairly, and asked them what they were talking about.

In Harding's 2008 authorized biography, The Tonya Tapes (written by Lynda D. Prouse from recorded interviews), Harding denied ever asking Vera Marano for the name of Nancy Kerrigan's training rink and that Marano may not have remembered details properly and "was a little bit out there." Harding also expressed anxiety when Prouse asked about Marano's testimony:

"I really didn't do anything wrong except ask questions to win a bet...It's just that this sounds bad...I think [the bet] was for a quarter or something like that. Big deal."

=== Gillooly's FBI testimony ===
Jeff Gillooly first testified about the attack plot on January 26, 1994. He said that in early December 1993, Harding phoned him after the 1993 NHK Trophy competition and was upset about her placement. He said he was also upset for her and later spoke about figure skating politics to his friend Shawn Eckardt. According to Gillooly, Eckardt then wondered aloud what would happen if Nancy Kerrigan were to receive a threat. Gillooly said he liked that idea. According to him, Eckardt wanted to keep the idea of injuring Kerrigan a secret from Harding, but Gillooly explained that injuring a competitor might psychologically affect Harding's performance too. Gillooly claimed that when he told Harding about plotting to injure Kerrigan, she thought it was "a good idea." However, she was skeptical about Eckardt's ability to arrange it. Gillooly assured her Eckardt knew people who could carry out the attack, and they could abort the plot if they did not like Eckardt's plan.

Shortly after Eckardt had spoken on the phone with Derrick Smith, he visited Gillooly and Harding at their home and quoted $4,500 to execute the plot. Gillooly replied that it was too much and said he could pay $2,000. On December 25, Gillooly had an answering machine message from Smith asking for more details about the plan. He claimed that he then phoned Eckardt to cancel the deal. Eckardt replied that Smith was already driving to Portland and that he needed more information about Kerrigan — a photograph and the location of the ice rink where she practiced. On December 27, Harding phoned her friend Vera Marano, a Pennsylvania figure skating writer, saying she and Gillooly had a "bet" about where Nancy Kerrigan trained. Marano then called a USFSA contact to find the name of the rink and left a message on Harding and Gillooly's answering machine. He said the message was difficult to understand, it sounded like "Tunee Can." Harding then phoned Marano again asking her to spell the arena name, and Gillooly said he watched as Harding wrote out "Tony Kent Arena."

Smith and his nephew, Shane Stant, arrived in Portland on December 27, drove to Eckardt's home, and asked for a meeting with Gillooly tomorrow at 10 a.m. Gillooly said Harding would be training at that time, but he agreed to meet them. On December 28, Harding finished her practice session at 10:30 a.m., then Gillooly drove them to Eckardt's home. According to him, she knew about the meeting and was anxious about Gillooly talking to dangerous people. He also testified that Harding told him she wanted Kerrigan injured either at her home or skating rink. Gillooly said he would phone her after the meeting, and Harding then drove to Gillooly's mother's house.

He arrived at 11 a.m. to the meeting held at Eckardt's home office, knocking on the door with Stant letting him in. Eckardt introduced Gillooly to Derrick Smith, using only his first name, Stant was introduced as Smith's "friend." Stant said it was "a pleasure" to meet Gillooly, then remained silent. Smith told Gillooly he could solve "problems," and Gillooly said he wanted Kerrigan out of the National Championships so Harding could win an Olympic gold medal. Once this was achieved, Harding would receive endorsements and he could offer $1,000 per week for her security. Gillooly said he could pay $6,500 for this plan and wanted to know what they could do. Eckardt suggested cutting Kerrigan's Achilles tendon, using a beater car to run her off the road, or "just kill her," but those ideas were opposed. Gillooly said only her right leg needed to be disabled, her landing leg; he claimed to have previously verified this with Harding. They settled on injuring Kerrigan's right leg. Gillooly was told his money would be returned if the deed was not completed. He then phoned Harding asking her to pick him up.

According to Gillooly, as he was driving himself and Harding home, she asked if the meeting went well. When he told her about their "money-back guarantee," Harding laughed out loud. Gillooly said he felt "pretty good" about the meeting and thought Smith was competent. He then told her, "I think we should go for it." According to Gillooly, Harding replied, "Let's do it."

He said the men would need another photo of Kerrigan and her "skating times." Gillooly suggested that Harding call the Tony Kent Arena because she knew ice skating terminology. According to him, she did phone the arena asking for Kerrigan's "patch and freestyle times," and phoned again for the address. They also found two photos of Kerrigan from the World Team handbook and Olympian magazine. Gillooly said Harding told him to tear off the magazine's mailing label because it had their home address. They drove to Eckardt's home that night with the photos, practice times, and $2,700 in cash. Gillooly said he paid Eckardt while Harding was in another room having coffee with Eckardt's mother. He remembered Harding briefly talking to him and Eckardt saying Kerrigan's photo was "flattering." Gillooly and Harding were surprised that Eckardt's mother seemed to know about the plot too.

Gillooly testified that by January 1994, he and Harding were upset that the plot had apparently failed. When Eckardt said it could still be done for more money, Gillooly asked "Do I have stupid written across my forehead?" Harding told him that Eckardt should return the money. On January 1, 1994, she had a late-night skating session from 11:30 p.m to 1 a.m., and Gillooly asked Eckardt to meet them at the rink. When Eckardt arrived, Gillooly agreed to pay more if Kerrigan could still be disabled before the Nationals competition.

According to Gillooly, Harding then approached both men and asked Eckardt if his previous back pains were better. She then angrily asked him why "this thing" (the plot) was not completed. Eckardt was flustered and said he did not know why.

=== Marano's FBI testimony ===
On January 22, 1994, Vera Marano was interviewed by the FBI. She said she worked as a freelance writer and had written some figure skating articles about Harding, regularly trading phone calls with her. Marano stated that Harding had phoned her about a "bet" regarding Nancy Kerrigan. She said Harding then asked for the name of Kerrigan's training rink and also wanted to know if Kerrigan owned property in Cape Cod.

=== Eckardt's FBI testimony ===
Shawn Eckardt first testified about parts of the attack plot on January 12, 1994. He had known Gillooly since they were in the first grade at school. In 1993, Eckardt was enrolled in a paralegal course at Pioneer Pacific College and trying to build a business called World Bodyguard Services. He claimed that in mid-December, Gillooly approached him to ask if he knew anyone who could disable Kerrigan.

On December 22, 1993, Eckardt received a call from his friend Derrick Smith who lived in Phoenix, Arizona. Smith wanted to know if Eckardt was still interested in moving to Phoenix to help set up an anti-terrorist training camp as they had previously discussed. Eckardt claimed he had a contract to disable a female figure skater issued by her rival's husband, that it involved good money because one of the rival's sponsors was George Steinbrenner. It was true that Steinbrenner had recently given Harding a $10,000 donation through the USFSA. Smith was interested in the deal and agreed to drive to Portland with his nephew, Shane Stant, to meet with Eckardt and Gillooly.

On December 28, as the men were waiting for Gillooly to arrive at his office, Smith persuaded Eckardt to tape record the meeting to use as "leverage." Eckardt hid the tape recorder on his desk under a paper towel. After the meeting, Gillooly left, returning that night to pay Eckardt in cash. He later gave the money to Smith who then drove Stant to the Seattle airport so Stant could fly to Boston. Smith returned to Arizona and was communicating separately with Stant and Eckardt by phone, while Eckardt reported back to Gillooly. Eckardt did not know where exactly Stant was and told Gillooly that Smith needed more money. Gillooly refused to pay more until he had receipts proving that someone was in Boston for their plan.

On January 1, 1994, Eckardt met Gillooly and Harding at the skating rink during her late-night session. He remembered Gillooly saying he would pay more money if the plot happened. Eckardt said Harding then skated up to him and commiserated about his ongoing back pain. According to him, she then said "You need to stop screwing around with this and get it done."

=== Smith's FBI testimony ===
When Derrick Smith was first interviewed by FBI on January 12, 1994, he held to the cover story that had been agreed upon with his co-conspirators until later in the day when he confessed to his part in the plot. He had met Eckardt when they were students at Mt. Hood Community College, shared an interest in espionage and survivalism, and had discussed opening a school together someday. Smith later worked for the United States Army as an "intelligence analyst" for about 3 years until he was discharged. He then worked in Milwaukie, Oregon as a group home coordinator for Developmental Systems Inc., a company that employed and trained mentally disabled adults to sort laundry hangers. The company said Smith was good at his work, remaining quiet and patient if a little anti-social. He quit that job in late 1993 and moved to Arizona with his wife. Smith then applied for a police officer job and was waiting for his interview to be scheduled before Eckardt told him about possible bodyguard work in Oregon.

When he phoned Eckardt on December 22, 1993, Eckardt told Smith he had a client who needed someone physically "taken down," saying the job would entail more bodyguard work in the future. Smith did not want to commit the assault himself because he had no criminal record, but said he might know someone who would do it. He knew his nephew, Shane Stant, was currently unemployed so Smith told him about his conversation with Eckardt.

On December 28, he and Stant were in Portland to discuss the attack plan. Before Gillooly arrived to the meeting, Smith asked Eckardt to tape-record the impending plotting for security. During the meeting, he thought Eckardt was leading Gillooly to think he had many "underground" contacts. After the meeting, he and Stant agreed not to injure Kerrigan "too badly."

=== Stant's FBI testimony ===
Shane Stant first testified about the attack plot after he turned himself in to the FBI on January 14, 1994. He was the son of Derrick Smith's wife's sister. Stant and his girlfriend also moved to Arizona along with Smith after once serving 15 days in jail for stealing cars. He was interested in bodybuilding, martial arts, and helping Smith open his training camp someday.

When Smith told Stant about his phone call with Eckardt, Stant wanted to know more specifics. Eckardt then phoned him to say the plot involved making "an accident happen" to a skater, maybe cutting an Achilles tendon. Stant said he would not cut anyone. Eckardt then offered more money than Gillooly stated and said more bodyguard work would follow. Stant agreed to go to Portland with Smith for a meeting, then he paid $59 for a 21-inch (53 cm) ASP tactical baton from a store called Spy Headquarters.

On December 29, 1993, Stant agreed to execute the plot and took a flight to Boston, yet discovered he could not rent a car with his girlfriend's credit card. He received his own credit card from an evening mail delivery the next day. On December 31, Stant drove to Yarmouth, Massachusetts, reaching the Tony Kent Arena that afternoon. Nancy Kerrigan had already finished her practice session and departed to Stoneham, Massachusetts for the weekend. Stant, thinking Kerrigan would still be training at the arena, frequented the parking lot for two days and relocated his car every half hour.

On January 3, 1994, he called the Tony Kent Arena and the staff told him that Nancy Kerrigan was travelling to Nationals. Stant then drove back to Boston so he could take a 20-hour Greyhound bus trip to Detroit. Smith decided to fly to the city too so they could finish the plot together. On January 5, Stant and Smith considered injuring Kerrigan's knee at her Westin hotel room in the Renaissance Center. They knew the correct room number because Tonya Harding was now in Detroit, and had told the registration clerk she wanted to give Kerrigan a poster at her room. Gillooly, still in Portland, then told Stant and Smith the room number. However, they later aborted the idea of a hotel-room-attack because they did not have a sure escape route.

== Aftermath ==
=== Immediate aftermath ===
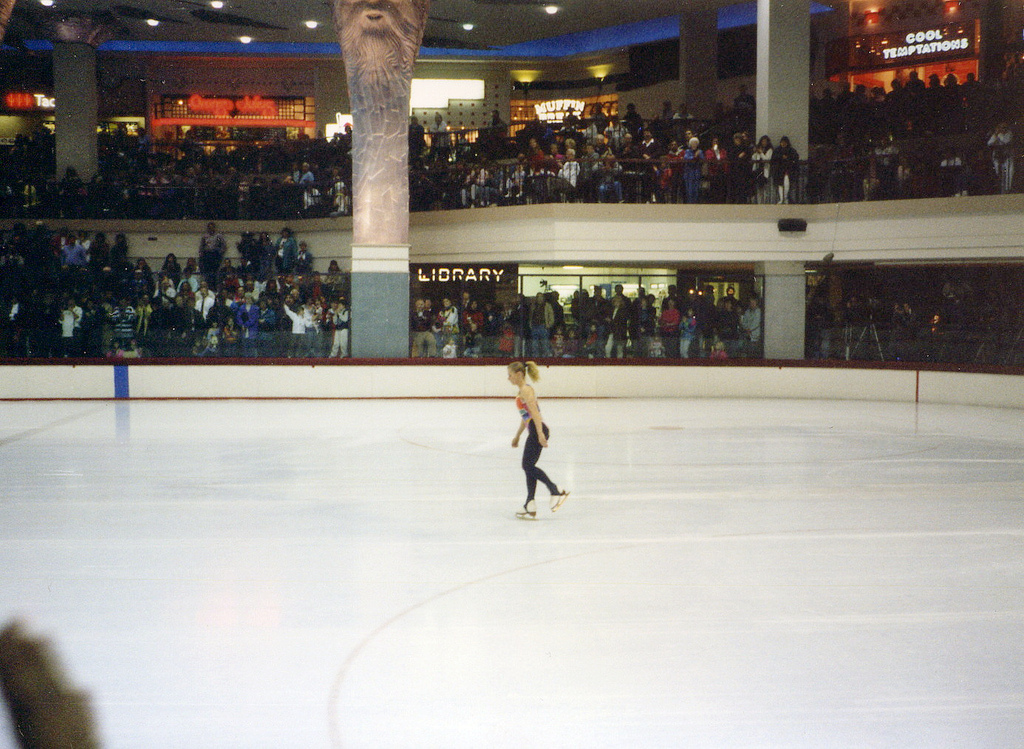
Harding's practice sessions at Clackamas Town Center, in preparation for the 1994 Winter Olympics, were attended by thousands of spectators and dozens of reporters and film crews.

On January 11, Ann Schatz interviewed Harding for KOIN-TV in Portland, Oregon. Schatz asked Harding whether someone she knew could have planned the attack. Harding replied, "I have definitely thought about it." Gillooly stood in her view behind the camera during the interview. The interview ended with Harding saying, "No one controls my life but me...if there's something in there that I don't like, I'm going to change it." Harding also confirmed she had spoken with FBI agents in Detroit and again in Portland. On January 13, Eckardt and Smith were arrested. On January 14, the United States Figure Skating Association (USFSA) made a statement on whether Eckardt's arrest affected Harding's Olympic placement: "We will deal only with the facts." Harding and Gillooly's separate lawyers confirmed the couple were in daily contact and cooperation with law enforcement. On January 15, Harding and Gillooly spoke with reporters, but declined to comment about the investigation. On January 16, Harding's lawyer held a news conference in which he read a statement denying Harding's involvement in the attack on Kerrigan. Harding left her home that evening to practice figure skating with her coaches, where she spoke with reporters and performed a triple Axel.

=== Harding's confession ===
On January 18, 1994, Harding was with her lawyers when she submitted to questioning by the DA and FBI. She was interviewed for over ten hours. Eight hours into the interview, her lawyer read a statement declaring her separation from Gillooly: "I continue to believe that Jeff is innocent of any wrongdoing. I wish him nothing but the best." Her full FBI transcript was released on February 1. The Seattle Times reported on the transcript, stating that Harding had "changed her story well into a long interview [...] After hours of denying any involvement in trying to cover up the plot, an FBI agent finally told [her] that he knew she had lied to him, that he would tell her exactly how she had lied to him." In the transcript's final passage, Harding stated, "I hope everyone understands. I'm telling on someone I really care about. I know now [Jeff] is involved. I'm sorry." On January 19, Gillooly surrendered to the FBI. On January 20, Diane Sawyer asked Harding on Primetime about the case. Harding said she had done nothing wrong. On January 27, it was reported that Gillooly had been testifying about the attack plot since January 26, possibly implicating Harding as allegedly assisting. Harding's close friend, Stephanie Quintero, with whom she was living, spoke to reporters on her behalf: "[Tonya] was shocked, very hurt. She was believing in [Jeff]." Harding later held a press conference to read a prepared statement. She said she was sorry Kerrigan was attacked, that she respected Kerrigan, and claimed not to have known in advance of the plot to disable her. Harding took responsibility "for failing to report things [about the assault] when I returned home from Nationals [on January 10]. Failure to immediately report this information is not a crime." Many states' laws, including Oregon's, state that the act of concealing criminal knowledge alone is not a crime.

The attack on Kerrigan received a substantial amount of publicity, and news media crews camped outside Kerrigan's home. In January 1994, the story was on the covers of Sports Illustrated, Newsweek, and TIME. There was now much speculation about Harding's alleged involvement in the assault plot. Because Harding and Kerrigan would be representing the US in the February Lillehammer Olympics, speculation reached a media frenzy. Abby Haight and J.E. Vader, reporters for The Oregonian, wrote a biography of Harding called Fire on Ice, which included excerpts of her January 18 FBI interview.

=== USFSA disciplinary panel ===
On February 5, 1994, the USFSA disciplinary panel stated there were reasonable grounds to believe Harding had violated the sport's code of ethics. Her admitted failure to report about an assault on a fellow competitor, supported by her FBI transcripts, led to Harding being formally charged with "[making] false statements about her knowledge". The USFSA also recommended that she face a disciplinary hearing. Claire Ferguson, president of the USFSA, decided not to suspend Harding's membership before a hearing took place. If she had been suspended, she likely still would have competed at the Olympics after filing suit, seeking an injunction against the USFSA, and asserting her rights under the Amateur Sports Act of 1978. The panel examined evidence including the testimonies of Stant and Smith, Harding and Gillooly's telephone records, and notes found in a Portland saloon trash bin on January 30. Harding was given thirty days to respond.

=== Sentences ===
On February 1, 1994, Gillooly's attorney negotiated a plea agreement in exchange for testimony regarding all involved parties in the attack. In July, Gillooly was sentenced to two years in prison after publicly apologizing to Kerrigan – adding "any apology coming from me rings hollow." Gillooly and Eckardt pleaded guilty to racketeering, while Stant and Smith pleaded guilty to conspiracy to commit second-degree assault. Eckardt, Stant, and Smith were given 18-month prison terms Judge Donald Londer noted the attack could have injured Kerrigan more seriously. Eckardt died in 2007.

On March 16, Harding pleaded guilty to conspiracy to hinder prosecution as a Class C felony offense at a Multnomah County court hearing. She and her lawyer, Robert Weaver, negotiated a plea agreement ensuring no further prosecution. Judge Londer conducted routine questioning to make certain Harding understood her agreement, that she was entering her plea "knowingly and voluntarily." Harding told Londer she was. Her plea admissions were knowing of the assault plot after the fact, settling on a cover story with Gillooly and Eckardt on January 10, witnessing payphone calls to Smith affirming the story on January 10 and 11, and lying to FBI. Law enforcement investigators had been following and videotaping the co-conspirators since January 10, and knew about the payphone calls. Harding's penalties included three years of probation, a $100,000 fine, and 500 hours community service. She agreed to reimburse Multnomah County $10,000 in legal expenses, undergo a psychiatric examination, and volunteered to give $50,000 to the Special Olympics Oregon (SOOR) charity. Oregon sentencing guidelines carried a maximum penalty of five years imprisonment for the offense.

=== Grand jury indictment ===
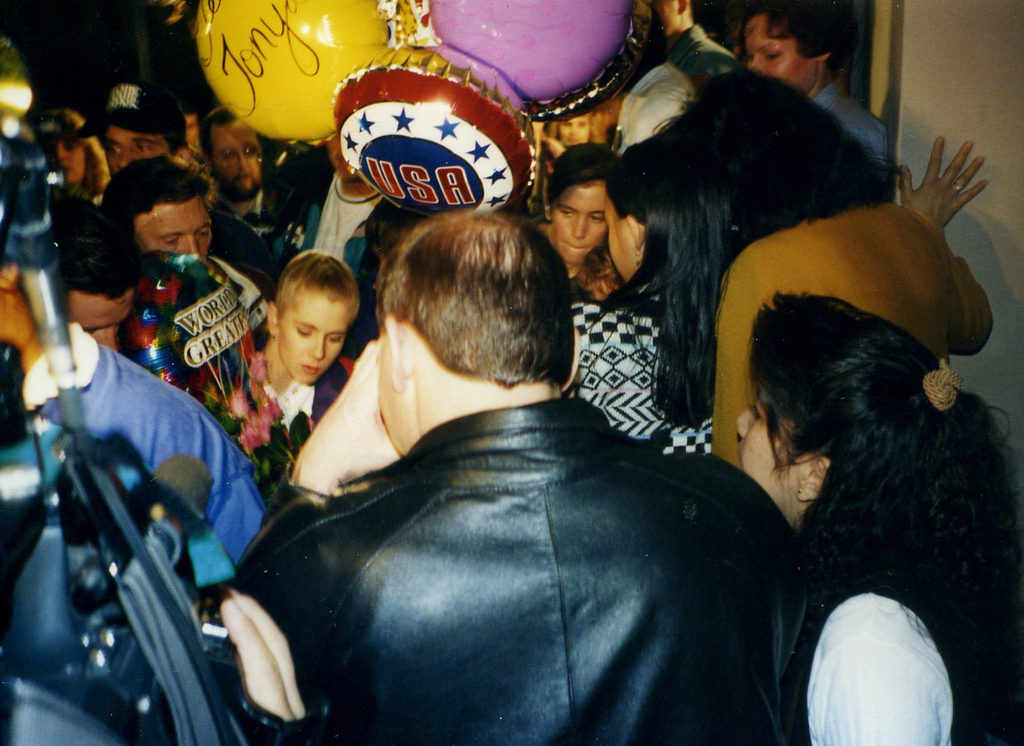
Harding arriving at Portland International Airport amid a crush of reporters after the 1994 Winter Olympics.

On March 21, 1994, a Portland grand jury issued an indictment stating there was evidence Harding participated in the attack plot. The indictment concluded more than two months of investigation and witness testimonies from Diane Rawlinson; Harding's choreographer Erika Bakacs; freelance figure skating writer Vera Marano; and Eckardt's college instructor and classmates. It stated there was evidence Harding fraudulently used USFSA-provided skating monies to finance the assault. It also read that Harding, Gillooly, Eckardt, Smith, and Stant agreed to "knowingly cause physical injury ... by means of a dangerous weapon." The grand jury foreman said the evidence implied Harding as "involved from the beginning or very close." She was not charged in the indictment due to the terms of her March 16 plea agreement.

=== Second disciplinary panel meeting ===
On June 29, the USFSA disciplinary panel met for nine hours over two days to consider Harding's alleged role in the attack. On June 30, chairman William Hybl stated,

"By a preponderance of the evidence, the panel did conclude that she had prior knowledge and was involved prior to the incident. This is based on civil standards, not criminal standards ... bank records, phone records – the way they came together to establish a case."

The panel decided that pertinent FBI reports, court documents, and Harding's March 16 plea agreement presented

"a clear disregard for fairness, good sportsmanship, and ethical behaviour."

Harding chose neither to attend nor participate in the two-day hearing. Weaver said the decision disappointed her but was not a surprise, and that she had not decided on an appeal. Harding was stripped of her 1994 U.S. Championship title and banned for life from participating in USFSA events as either skater or coach. The USFSA has no dominion over professional skating events, yet Harding was also persona non grata on the pro circuit. Few skaters and promoters would work with her, and she did not benefit from the ensuing boom in professional skating after the scandal.

== In popular culture ==
The incident was widely covered in the West (especially the U.S., where the incident was on the front-page of most newspapers in January 1994) and consequently influenced popular culture significantly. The most notable example is the 2017 film I, Tonya, with Margot Robbie portraying Harding. It is centered on the attack from the perspective of Harding.

In music, the attack was mentioned in "Weird Al" Yankovic's 1994 song "Headline News", a parody of the Crash Test Dummies hit "Mmm Mmm Mmm Mmm". The lyrics, which are written in a comedic style, mentions a figure skater hiring someone to "club her [rival] in the kneecap", with the incident being dramatized in a tongue-in-cheek manner in the accompanying music video. The event is also referenced in the 2011 song "Strange Clouds" by B.o.B featuring Lil Wayne; "Nancy Kerrigan" by Frog (2015); "Tonya Harding" by Sufjan Stevens (2017); "Stay Frosty Royal Milk Tea" by Fall Out Boy (2018); and “TONYA” by Brockhampton (2018).

The rap-duo group $UICIDEBOY$ referenced both Harding and Kerrigan, the 1994 Lillehammer Olympic Free Skate, and Kerrigan’s attack on a two and half minute song on their 2021 album “Long Term Effects of SUFFERING”. The title of, and lyric video for the song features Harding and video of the 1994 Lillehammer Winter Olympic Free Skate (“If Self-Destruction Was an Olympic Event, I’d Be Tonya Harding” - featuring Harding in her iconic sparkling purple, gold, and silver outfit/costume), and Kerrigan/Kerrigan’s assault at the end of the song (a sound clip of a few seconds of Kerrigan screaming “why, why, why!?” in pain, following the assault.)

In television, Fran Drescher says: “Call Gillooly” in the 1994 The Nanny episode S1 E22: "I Don't Remember Mama", likely a reference to Jeff Gillooly. In the 1994 Animaniacs segment "Baloney and Kids", as the Warners panic when Baloney the Dinosaur shakes off their cartoonish brand of violence, Yakko yells out "Call in the National Guard," to which Dot adds, "Or Tonya Harding's bodyguard". The event is mentioned in the 1997 South Park episode S1 E10: "Damien" and a video of the event is featured in the 2003 episode S7 E3: "Toilet Paper". Gillooly is mentioned as a former Barder College student is the seventh episode of 3-South, "Coke Addicts" (2002). An episode of the animated comedy Futurama, "Stench and Stenchibility" (2013), features a devilish six-year-old girl named Tonya (voiced by Tara Strong; a reference to Harding), who is the opponent of Bender Rodriguez (John DiMaggio) in a tap dancing competition held by Randy Munchnik. As Bender attempts to sabotage her performance by filling her tap shoes with tacks in the locker room, Tonya catches him in the act, and breaks his leg with a nightstick in a similar manner to the attack on Kerrigan.

In the cancelled 1994 Data East arcade fighting game Tattoo Assassins, the character Keller's backstory directly references the assault. Spyro: Year of the Dragon, a 2000 platform video game, centers around defending a polar bear ice dancer named Nancy from getting assaulted by Rhynoc hockey players as she attempts to rehearse for a performance.

Barack Obama, former President of the United States, referenced the attack while giving a speech in 2007 in Iowa during his run in the 2008 Democratic presidential primaries (which he won and went on to win the 2008 presidential election). He stated "Folks said there's no way Obama has a chance unless he goes and kneecaps the person ahead of us; does a Tonya Harding." This statement, with "Tonya Harding" being used in place of "hitting their kneecap" (a phenomenon that is an informal eponym), encapsulates the effect the incident had on American culture and language.

A common theme throughout popular culture is seeing the incident from the perspective of Harding being involved in the attack, despite this never being definitively proven. The film I, Tonya, unlike most other examples, looks at the incident from the perspective of Harding being mostly innocent. This challenges the common belief in the U.S. in the 1990s that Harding was involved, a belief derived from media coverage. The 2017 film has caused a shift in public opinion, according to a qualitative study by Pitlik et al. in 2023.
