= Paris Latino =

1983 single by Bandolero

Single by Bandolero
- B-side: "El bandido caballero"
- Released: 1983
- Studio: Continental (Paris)
- Genre: Hip-hop, Funk, Disco
- Length: 3:55
- Label: Virgin
- Songwriter(s): Carlos Perez; José Perez
- Producer(s): Alexis

Bandolero singles chronology
"Paris Latino" (1983)	"Cocoloco" (1984)

"Paris Latino" is the debut single by French band Bandolero, released in 1983. In 2002, the song was successfully covered by Star Academy 2. In 2017, the movie Call Me By Your Name used the song in its soundtrack. The song was remixed by Jellybean Benitez for radio and club play.

== Track listing and formats ==
- French 7-inch single

A. "Paris Latino" – 3:55
B. "El bandido caballero" – 3:50

- French 12-inch maxi-single

A. "Paris Latino" – 5:10
B1. "Tango Tango" – 5:20
B2. "El bandido caballero" – 4:15

== Charts ==
=== Weekly charts ===
Weekly chart performance for "Paris Latino"
Chart (1983–1984)	Peak position
Belgium (Ultratop 50 Flanders)	19
France (SNEP)	3
Italy (Musica e dischi)	2
Netherlands (Dutch Top 40)	12
Netherlands (Single Top 100)	9
Spain (AFYVE)	7
Switzerland (Schweizer Hitparade)	2

=== Year-end charts ===
Year-end chart performance for "Paris Latino"
Chart (1983)	Position
France (SNEP)	25

== Star Academy 2 version ==
"Paris Latino"

Single by Star Academy 2

from the album Fait sa boum
- B-side: "Video Killed the Radio Star"
- Released: 10 December 2002
- Genre: Pop
- Length: 3:31
- Label: Mercury
- Songwriter(s): Carlos Perez; José Perez
- Producer(s): Christian Lachenal

Star Academy 2 singles chronology
"Paris Latino" (2002)	"Musique" (2002)

In late 2002, the song was covered by Star Academy 2, on the album Fait sa boum which is composed of cover versions of 1980s hit. The song, performed during Star Academy's concert tour, is also available on the album Live. It achieved success, topping the singles charts in France and Belgium (Wallonia). As of August 2014, the song was the eleventh best-selling single of the 21st century in France, with 651,000 units sold.

=== Track listing and formats ===
- French CD single
1. "Paris Latino" – 3:31
2. "Video Killed the Radio Star" – 3:23

=== Charts ===
==== Weekly charts ====
Chart (2002–2003)	Peak position
Belgium (Ultratop 50 Wallonia)	1
France (SNEP)	1
Switzerland (Schweizer Hitparade)	7

==== Year-end charts ====
Chart (2002)	Position
France (SNEP)	18

Chart (2003)	Position
Belgium (Ultratop 50 Wallonia)	24
France (SNEP)	13
Switzerland (Schweizer Hitparade)	55

=== Certifications and sales ===
Certifications and sales for "Paris Latino"
Region	Certification	Certified units/sales
Belgium (BRMA)	Gold	25,000^{*}
^{*} Sales figures based on certification alone.
