= Émilie Georges =

French screenwriter and film producer

- Born: Paris, France
- Citizenship: France
- Education: University of Paris 1 Pantheon-Sorbonne; University of Paris 8 Vincennes-Saint-Denis
- Occupations: Screenwriter; producer
- Years active: 1994–present
- Title: Co-founder of Memento Films International

Émilie Georges (French pronunciation: [emili ʒɔʁʒ]) is a French screenwriter and film producer, best known for producing the critically acclaimed film Call Me by Your Name, for which she was co-nominated for the Academy Award for Best Picture at the 90th Academy Awards.

She is a founder of a production company Memento Films International (MFI).

== Early life and education ==
Georges studied at Lycée Chaptal in Paris, and obtained a Master of advanced studies (DEA) in Geopolitics from University of Paris 8 Vincennes-Saint-Denis and Maitrises in European law and International economics from University of Paris 1 Pantheon-Sorbonne.

== Filmography ==
- 2005: Kilomètre Zéro (executive producer) / (producer)
- 2006: Taxidermia (co-producer)
- 2006: Aurore (producer)
- 2006: Aurore, le making-of (Video documentary short) (producer)
- 2009: Undertow (executive producer)
- 2011: Headshot (associate producer)
- 2013: We Are What We Are (executive producer)
- 2013: Circles (producer)
- 2014: Cold in July (executive producer)
- 2014: Still Alice (executive producer)
- 2015: Louder Than Bombs (executive producer)
- 2017: Berlin Syndrome (executive producer)
- 2017: Call Me by Your Name (producer)
- 2017: Small Crimes (executive producer)
- 2018: Piercing (executive producer)
- 2020: My Salinger Year (executive producer)
- 2021: Huda's Salon (executive producer)
- 2022: Falcon Lake (executive producer)
- 2023: Drift (producer)
- 2024: Dreams in Nightmares (executive producer)
- 2025: Atropia (producer)

=== Other ===
- 2013: Blue Ruin (thanks)
- 2015: Cop Car (thanks and international distribution)
- 2015: The Propaganda Game (documentary) (international sales)
- 2026: The Man I Love (French distribution)
