= Tonya Harding (song) =

Single by Sufjan Stevens
- Released: December 8, 2017
- Length: 5:05
- Label: Asthmatic Kitty
- Songwriter: Sufjan Stevens
- Producer: Sufjan Stevens

Sufjan Stevens singles chronology
"Mystery of Love" (2017)	"Tonya Harding" (2017)	"Watch Fire" (2018)

"Tonya Harding" is a song written, produced, and recorded by American singer-songwriter Sufjan Stevens. It was released digitally through Asthmatic Kitty Records on December 8, 2017. The song's release was intended to coincide with that of the Tonya Harding biopic I, Tonya. Stevens said in an interview he had sent the producers the song for use in the film but they "couldn't find a way to use it". Lyrically, "Tonya Harding" is about Tonya Harding and her role in Nancy Kerrigan's assault.

== Reception ==
In January 2018, the song entered the Ultratip portion of Belgium's Flanders' Ultratop chart where it debuted and peaked at number 46.

Tonya Harding, though never having personally listened to the song, is not a fan of the song in principle, resenting its use of her image and name, saying when asked, “Who gives these people permission to use my name? You all disrespected me and it hurt. I’m a human being and it hurt my heart."

== Charts ==
Chart performance for "Tonya Harding"
Chart (2018)	Peak position
Belgium (Ultratip Bubbling Under Flanders)	46
UK Physical Singles (OCC)	52
