= Bandolero (band) =

French pop band

- Origin: France
- Genres: Funk; dance; synth-pop
- Years active: 1983–1989
- Labels: Virgin; CBS
- Past members: Carlos Perez; José Perez; Djill Bourezak

Bandolero was a French band best known for its 1983 dance hit "Paris Latino". The group consisted of the two brothers Carlos and José Perez (both formerly of the punk rock band "Guilty Razors") and Jill Merme-Bourezak.

== Discography ==
=== Singles ===
Year	Title	Charts		
Year	Title	CH	NL	BE
1983	"Paris Latino"	2	9	19
1984	"Cocoloco"	—	—	—
1985	"Conquistador"	—	—	—
1988	"Bagatelle"	—	—	—
1989	"Rêves noirs"	—	—	—
