= List of accolades received by Darkest Hour (film) =

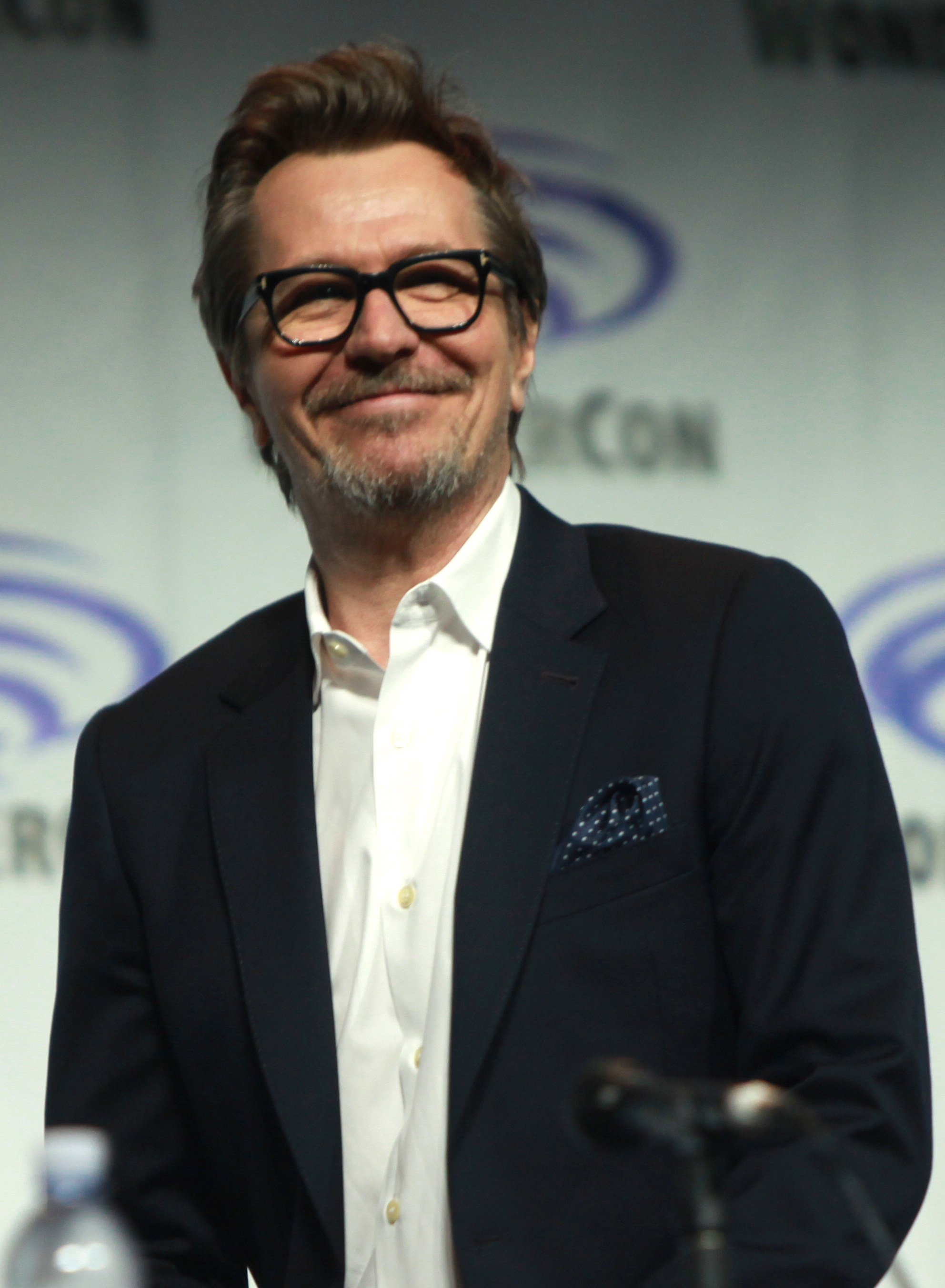
- Gary Oldman's performance earned him several wins and nominations, including the Academy Award for Best Actor.
Accolades
Award	Won	Nominated
AACTA International Awards	1	2
Academy Awards	2	6
Alliance of Women Film Journalists	1	1
American Society of Cinematographers	0	1
Art Directors Guild	0	1
Austin Film Critics Association	0	2
British Academy Film Awards	2	9
Chicago Film Critics Association	0	1
Critics' Choice Awards	2	4
Dallas-Fort Worth Film Critics Association	1	2
Detroit Film Critics Society	0	1
Dorian Awards	0	1
Empire Awards	0	2
Evening Standard British Film Awards	0	1
Florida Film Critics Circle	0	1
Georgia Film Critics Association	0	2
Golden Globe Awards	1	1
Hollywood Film Awards	3	3
IGN Awards	0	2
IndieWire Critics Poll	0	1
London Film Critics' Circle	0	2
Make-Up Artists and Hair Stylists Guild	2	3
New York Film Critics Circle	1	1
Online Film Critics Society	1	1
Palm Springs International Film Festival	1	1
San Diego Film Critics Society	0	1
San Francisco Film Critics Circle	0	1
Satellite Awards	1	5
Screen Actors Guild Awards	1	1
Seattle Film Critics Society	0	2
St. Louis Film Critics Association	1	4
Toronto Film Critics Association	0	1
Vancouver Film Critics Circle	0	1
Visual Effects Society Awards	0	1
Washington D.C. Area Film Critics Association	1	1
Women Film Critics Circle	1	1
- Total number of awards and nominations (Note: Certain award groups do not award only one winner, as they may recognize several recipients, and include runners-up. Since this is a specific recognition and is different from losing an award, runner-up mentions are considered wins in the awards tally.) (Note: Organizations without a Wikipedia page are not included in list of accolades.)
Totals	23	71	
- References

Darkest Hour is a 2017 war drama film directed by Joe Wright and written by Anthony McCarten. It stars Gary Oldman as Winston Churchill, and is an account of his early days as Prime Minister, as Nazi Germany's Wehrmacht swept across Western Europe, threatening to defeat the United Kingdom during World War II. The film also stars Kristin Scott Thomas, Lily James, Ben Mendelsohn, Stephen Dillane, and Ronald Pickup.

The film had its world premiere at the Telluride Film Festival on 1 September 2017, and also screened at the Toronto International Film Festival. It began a limited release in the United States on 22 November 2017, before expanding on 22 December, and was released on 12 January 2018 in the United Kingdom. The film grossed $149 million worldwide against a budget of $30 million.

Darkest Hour generally received positive reviews, praising in particular Oldman's performance, many who labelled it as one of the best of his career. For his role, he won the Academy Award for Best Actor, the BAFTA Award for Best Actor in a Leading Role, Golden Globe Award for Best Actor – Motion Picture Drama and the Screen Actors Guild Award for Outstanding Performance by a Male Actor in a Leading Role. At the 90th Academy Awards the film earned six nominations, including Best Picture, and won for Best Actor and Best Makeup and Hairstyling. At the 71st British Academy Film Awards it received nine nominations including Best Film and Outstanding British Film.

== Accolades ==
Award	Date of ceremony	Category	Recipient(s) and nominee(s)	Result	Ref(s)
AACTA International Awards	5 January 2018	Best Actor	Gary Oldman	Won	
AACTA International Awards	5 January 2018	Best Supporting Actor	Ben Mendelsohn	Nominated	
Academy Awards	4 March 2018	Best Picture	Tim Bevan, Eric Fellner, Lisa Bruce, Anthony McCarten and Douglas Urbanski	Nominated	
Academy Awards	4 March 2018	Best Actor	Gary Oldman	Won	
Academy Awards	4 March 2018	Best Cinematography	Bruno Delbonnel	Nominated	
Academy Awards	4 March 2018	Best Costume Design	Jacqueline Durran	Nominated	
Academy Awards	4 March 2018	Best Makeup and Hairstyling	Kazuhiro Tsuji, David Malinowski and Lucy Sibbick	Won	
Academy Awards	4 March 2018	Best Production Design	Sarah Greenwood and Katie Spencer	Nominated	
Alliance of Women Film Journalists	9 January 2018	Best Actor	Gary Oldman	Won	
American Society of Cinematographers	17 February 2018	Outstanding Achievement in Cinematography in Theatrical Releases	Bruno Delbonnel	Nominated	
Art Directors Guild	27 January 2018	Excellence in Production Design for a Period Film	Sarah Greenwood	Nominated	
Austin Film Critics Association	8 January 2018	Best Actor	Gary Oldman	Nominated	
Austin Film Critics Association	8 January 2018	Best Cinematography	Bruno Delbonnel	Nominated	
British Academy Film Awards	18 February 2018	Best Film	Tim Bevan, Lisa Bruce, Eric Fellner, Anthony McCarten and Douglas Urbanski	Nominated	
British Academy Film Awards	18 February 2018	Best Actor in a Leading Role	Gary Oldman	Won	
British Academy Film Awards	18 February 2018	Best Actress in a Supporting Role	Kristin Scott Thomas	Nominated	
British Academy Film Awards	18 February 2018	Best Cinematography	Bruno Delbonnel	Nominated	
British Academy Film Awards	18 February 2018	Best British Film	Tim Bevan, Lisa Bruce, Eric Fellner, Anthony McCarten, Douglas Urbanski and Joe Wright	Nominated	
British Academy Film Awards	18 February 2018	Best Film Music	Dario Marianelli	Nominated	
British Academy Film Awards	18 February 2018	Best Production Design	Sarah Greenwood and Katie Spencer	Nominated	
British Academy Film Awards	18 February 2018	Best Costume Design	Jacqueline Durran	Nominated	
British Academy Film Awards	18 February 2018	Best Makeup and Hair	David Malinowski, Ivana Primorac, Lucy Sibbick and Kazuhiro Tsuji	Won	
Chicago Film Critics Association	12 December 2017	Best Actor	Gary Oldman	Nominated	
Critics' Choice Movie Awards	11 January 2018	Best Picture	Tim Bevan, Eric Fellner, Lisa Bruce, Anthony McCarten and Douglas Urbanski	Nominated	
Critics' Choice Movie Awards	11 January 2018	Best Actor	Gary Oldman	Won	
Critics' Choice Movie Awards	11 January 2018	Best Score	Dario Marianelli	Nominated	
Critics' Choice Movie Awards	11 January 2018	Best Makeup	Darkest Hour	Won	
Dallas–Fort Worth Film Critics Association	13 December 2017	Best Film	Darkest Hour	10th Place	
Dallas–Fort Worth Film Critics Association	13 December 2017	Best Actor	Gary Oldman	Won	
Detroit Film Critics Society	7 December 2017	Best Actor	Gary Oldman	Nominated	
Dorian Awards	24 February 2018	Best Performance of the Year – Actor	Gary Oldman	Nominated	
Empire Awards	18 March 2018	Best British Film	Darkest Hour	Nominated	
Empire Awards	18 March 2018	Best Actor	Gary Oldman	Nominated	
Evening Standard British Film Awards	8 February 2018	Best Actor	Gary Oldman	Nominated	
Florida Film Critics Circle	23 December 2017	Best Actor	Gary Oldman	Runner-up	
Georgia Film Critics Association	12 January 2018	Best Actor	Gary Oldman	Nominated	
Georgia Film Critics Association	12 January 2018	Best Original Score	Dario Marianelli	Nominated	
Golden Globe Awards	7 January 2018	Best Actor – Motion Picture Drama	Gary Oldman	Won	
Hollywood Film Awards	6 November 2017	Hollywood Career Achievement Award	Gary Oldman	Won	
Hollywood Film Awards	6 November 2017	Hollywood Director Award	Joe Wright	Won	
Hollywood Film Awards	6 November 2017	Hollywood Costume Design Award	Jacqueline Durran (Note: Also credited for Beauty and the Beast.)	Won	
IGN Awards	19 December 2017	Best Drama Movie	Darkest Hour	Nominated	
IGN Awards	19 December 2017	Best Lead Performer in a Movie	Gary Oldman	Nominated	
IndieWire Critics Poll	19 December 2017	Best Actor	Gary Oldman	5th Place (Note: Tied with Daniel Kaluuya for Get Out.)	
London Film Critics' Circle	28 January 2018	Actor of the Year	Gary Oldman	Nominated	
London Film Critics' Circle	28 January 2018	British/Irish Actor of the Year	Gary Oldman	Nominated	
Make-Up Artists and Hair Stylists Guild	24 February 2018	Feature Motion Picture: Best Period and/or Character Makeup	Ivana Primorac and Flora Moody	Won	
Make-Up Artists and Hair Stylists Guild	24 February 2018	Feature Motion Picture: Best Period and/or Character Hair	Ivana Primorac and Flora Moody	Nominated	
Make-Up Artists and Hair Stylists Guild	24 February 2018	Feature Motion Picture: Best Special Makeup Effects	Kazuhiro Tsuji, David Malinowski and Lucy Sibbick	Won	
Motion Picture Sound Editors	18 February 2018	Best Sound Editing: Dialogue and ADR in a Feature Film	Craig Berkey, Becki Ponting, Michael Maroussas	Nominated	
New York Film Critics Online	10 December 2017	Best Actor	Gary Oldman	Won	
Online Film Critics Society	28 December 2017	Best Actor	Gary Oldman	Won	
Palm Springs International Film Festival	2 January 2018	Desert Palm Achievement Award for Best Actor	Gary Oldman	Won	
San Diego Film Critics Society	11 December 2017	Best Actor	Gary Oldman	Nominated	
San Francisco Film Critics Circle	10 December 2017	Best Actor	Gary Oldman	Nominated	
Satellite Awards	10 February 2018	Best Actor – Motion Picture	Gary Oldman	Won (Note: Tied with Harry Dean Stanton for Lucky)	
Satellite Awards	10 February 2018	Best Cinematography	Bruno Delbonnel	Nominated	
Satellite Awards	10 February 2018	Best Original Score	Dario Marianelli	Nominated	
Satellite Awards	10 February 2018	Best Editing	Valerio Bonelli	Nominated	
Satellite Awards	10 February 2018	Best Sound (Editing and Mixing)	Darkest Hour	Nominated	
Screen Actors Guild Awards	21 January 2018	Outstanding Performance by a Male Actor in a Leading Role	Gary Oldman	Won	
Seattle Film Critics Society	18 December 2017	Best Actor	Gary Oldman	Nominated	
Seattle Film Critics Society	18 December 2017	Best Costume Design	Jacqueline Durran	Nominated	
St. Louis Film Critics Association	17 December 2017	Best Actor	Gary Oldman	Won	
St. Louis Film Critics Association	17 December 2017	Best Supporting Actress	Kristin Scott Thomas	Nominated	
St. Louis Film Critics Association	17 December 2017	Best Cinematography	Bruno Delbonnel	Nominated	
St. Louis Film Critics Association	17 December 2017	Best Editing	Valerio Bonelli	Nominated	
Toronto Film Critics Association	10 December 2017	Best Actor	Gary Oldman	Runner-up	
Vancouver Film Critics Circle	6 January 2018	Best Actor	Gary Oldman	Nominated	
Visual Effects Society Awards	13 February 2018	Outstanding Supporting Visual Effects in a Photoreal Feature	Stephane Naze, Warwick Hewitt, Guillaume Terrien and Benjamin Magana	Nominated	
Washington D.C. Area Film Critics Association	8 December 2017	Best Actor	Gary Oldman	Won	
Whistler Film Festival	3 December 2017	Audience Award	Darkest Hour	Won	
Women Film Critics Circle	17 December 2017	Best Actor	Gary Oldman	Won	
