= 71st British Academy Film Awards =

2018 film award ceremony

- Date: 18 February 2018
- Site: Royal Albert Hall, London
- Hosted by: Joanna Lumley

Highlights
- Best Film: Three Billboards Outside Ebbing, Missouri
- Best British Film: Three Billboards Outside Ebbing, Missouri
- Best Actor: Gary Oldman; Darkest Hour
- Best Actress: Frances McDormand; Three Billboards Outside Ebbing, Missouri
- Most awards: Three Billboards Outside Ebbing, Missouri (5)
- Most nominations: The Shape of Water (12)

The 71st British Academy Film Awards, more commonly known as the BAFTAs, were held on 18 February 2018 at the Royal Albert Hall in London, honouring the best national and foreign films of 2017. Presented by the British Academy of Film and Television Arts, accolades were handed out for the best feature-length film and documentaries of any nationality that were screened at British cinemas in 2017. Following revelations of sexual harassment in the film industry, many attendees wore black or a badge to show their support for the Time's Up movement.

The nominees were announced on 9 January 2018 by actresses Natalie Dormer and Letitia Wright. The Shape of Water received the most nominations in twelve categories; Darkest Hour and Three Billboards Outside Ebbing, Missouri followed with nine each. As with the 75th Golden Globe Awards, there was criticism for the lack of female nominees for Best Director, with Greta Gerwig notably not nominated for Lady Bird.

English actress Joanna Lumley hosted the ceremony for the first time, replacing Stephen Fry following his twelve years of service as host.

== Winners and nominees ==
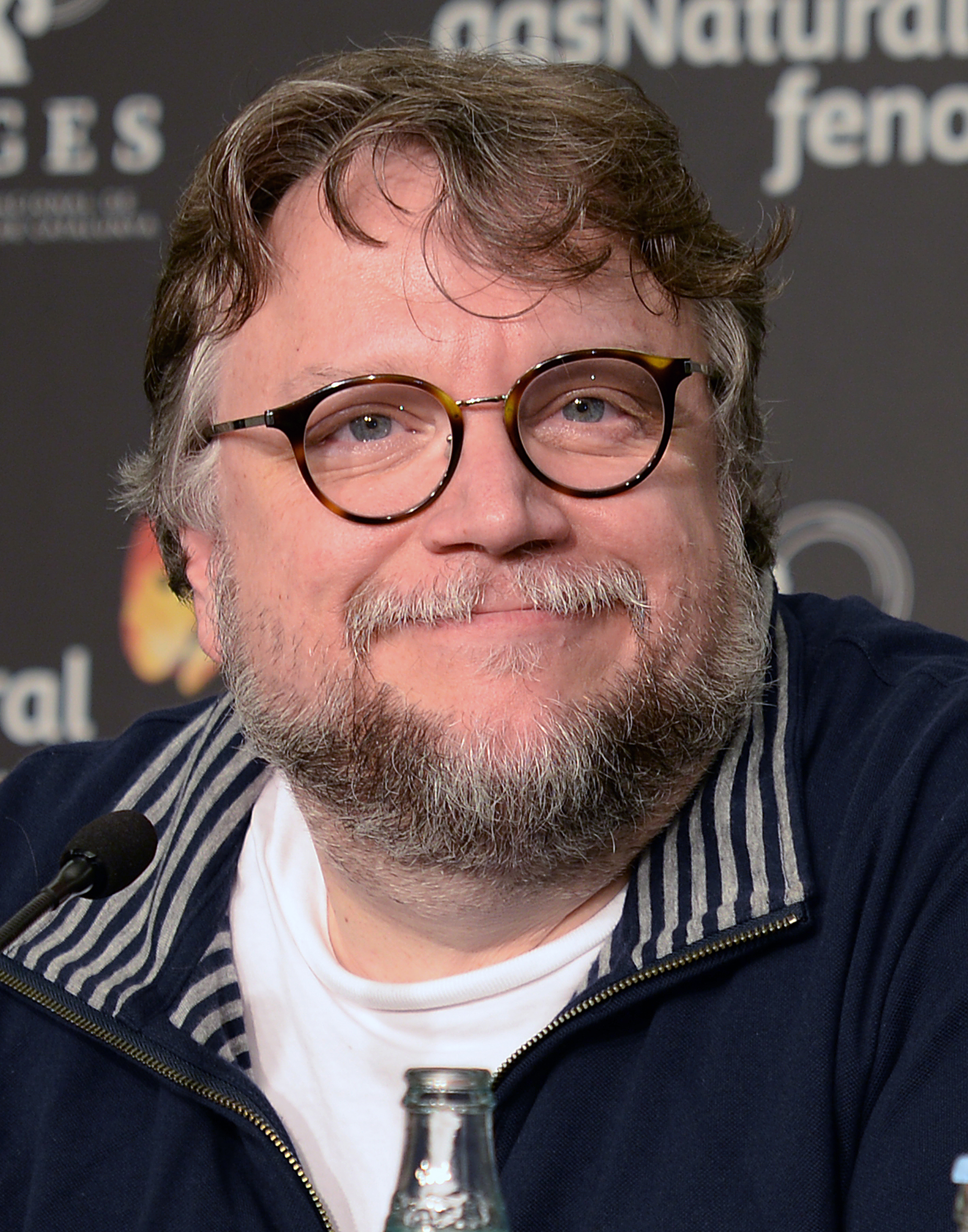
Guillermo del Toro, Best Director winner

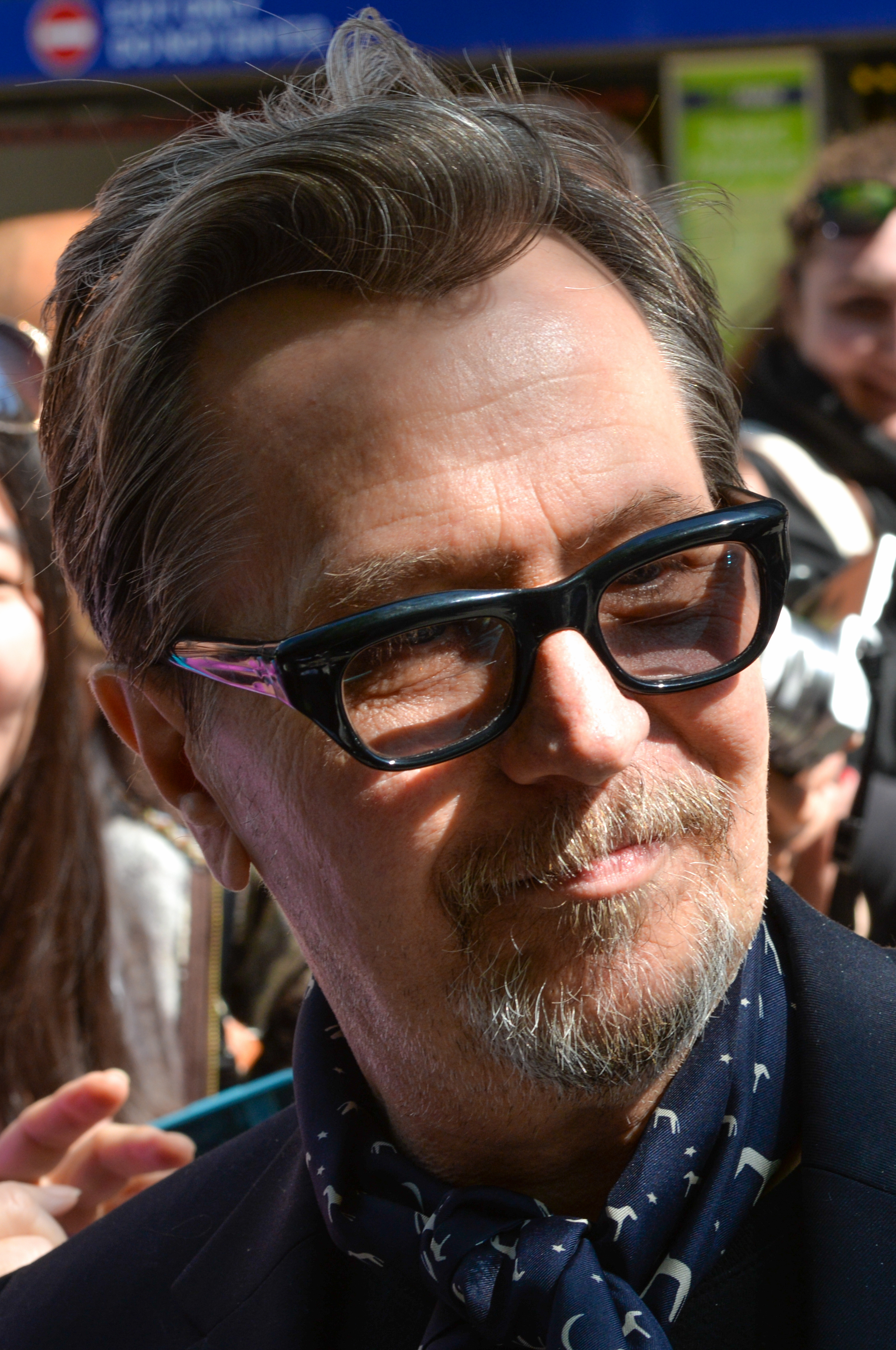
Gary Oldman, Best Actor winner

Frances McDormand, Best Actress winner

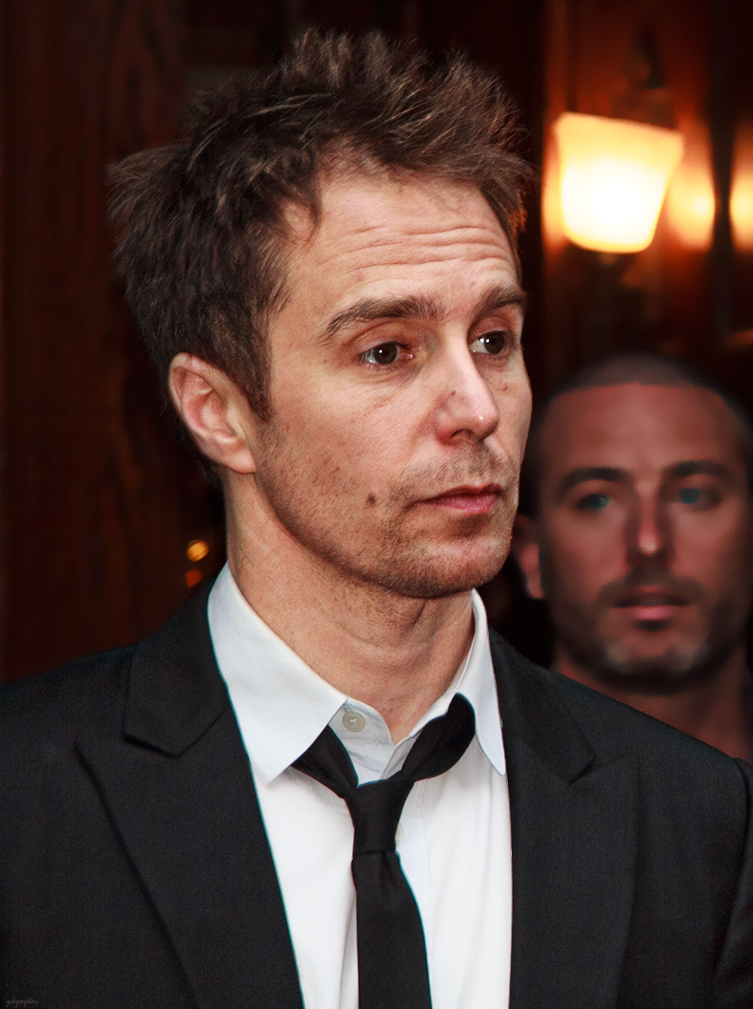
Sam Rockwell, Best Supporting Actor winner

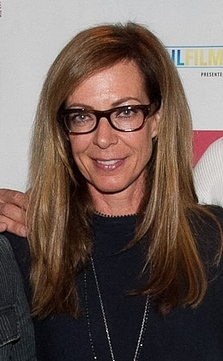
Allison Janney, Best Supporting Actress winner

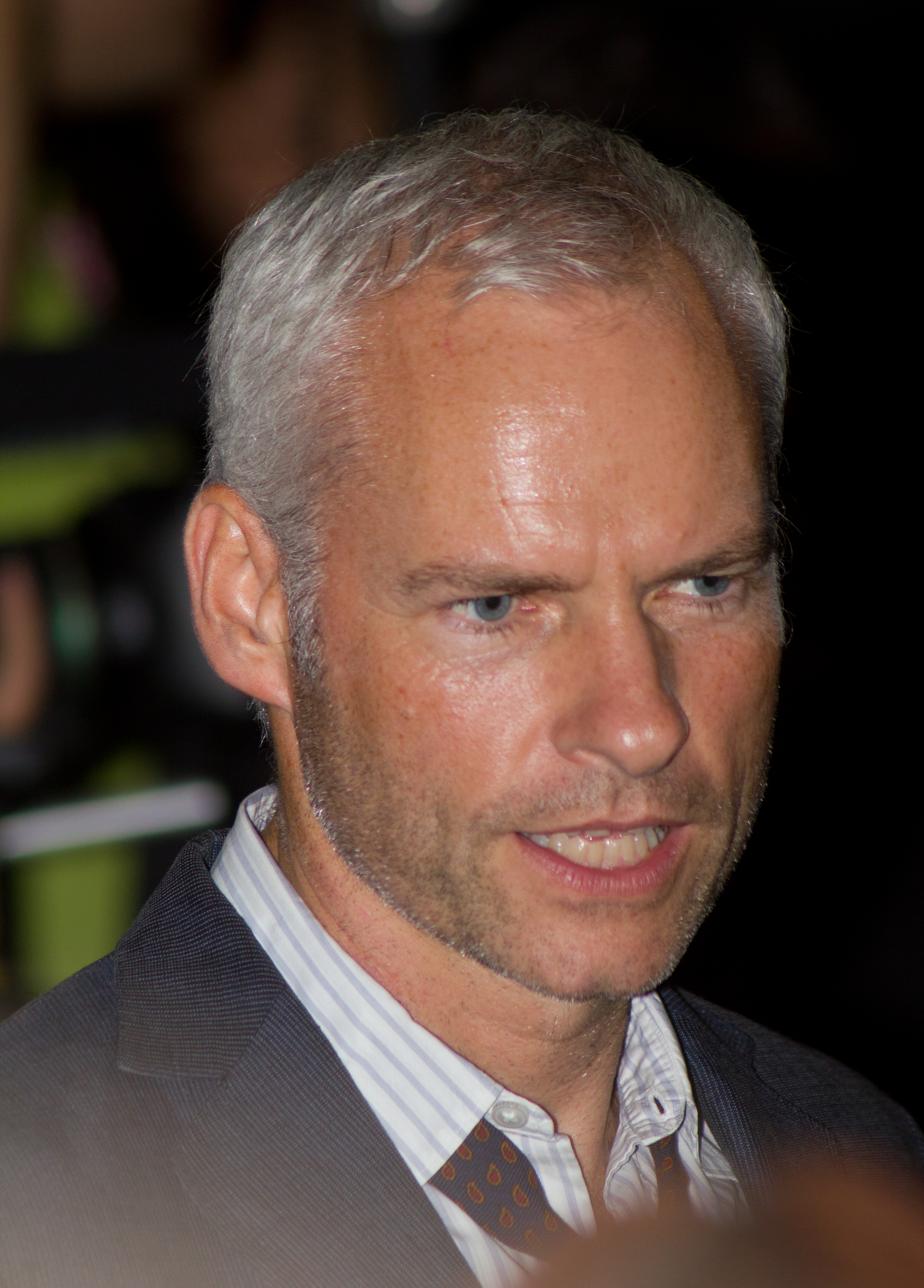
Martin McDonagh, Best Original Screenplay winner

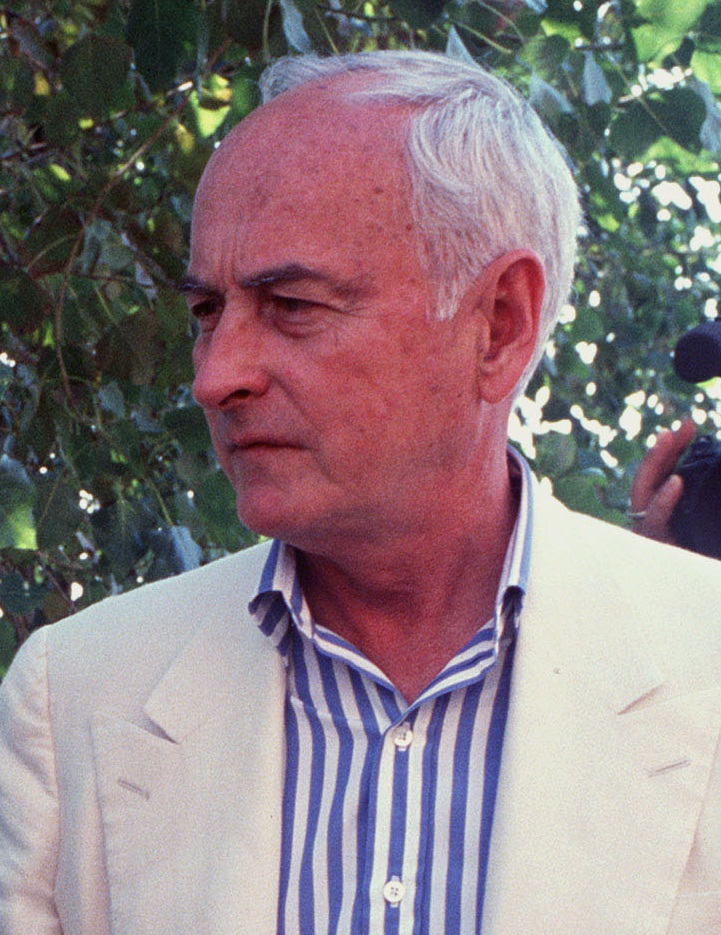
James Ivory, Best Adapted Screenplay winner

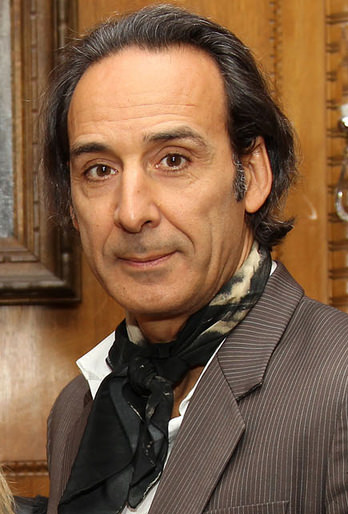
Alexandre Desplat, Best Original Music winner

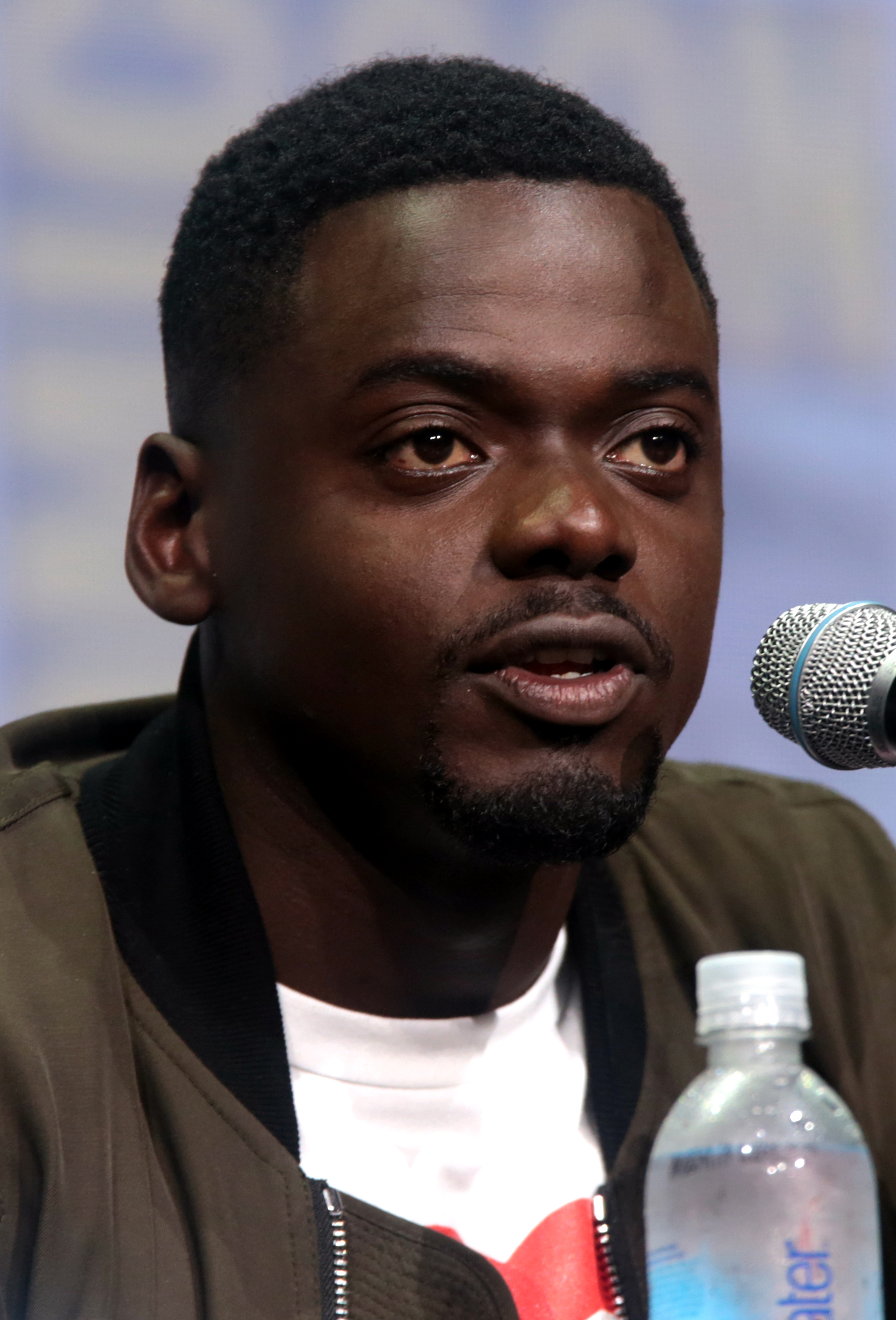
Daniel Kaluuya, EE Rising Star Award winner

The nominees were announced on 9 January 2018. The winners were announced on 18 February 2018.

=== BAFTA Fellowship ===
- Ridley Scott

=== Outstanding British Contribution to Cinema ===
- National Film and Television School

Best Film: Three Billboards Outside Ebbing, Missouri – Graham Broadbent, Peter Czernin and Martin McDonagh; Call Me by Your Name – Émilie Georges, Luca Guadagnino, Marco Morabito and Peter Spears; Darkest Hour – Tim Bevan, Lisa Bruce, Eric Fellner, Anthony McCarten and Douglas Urbanski; Dunkirk – Christopher Nolan and Emma Thomas; The Shape of Water – Guillermo del Toro and J. Miles Dale	Best Direction: Guillermo del Toro – The Shape of Water; Luca Guadagnino – Call Me by Your Name; Martin McDonagh – Three Billboards Outside Ebbing, Missouri; Christopher Nolan – Dunkirk; Denis Villeneuve – Blade Runner 2049
Best Actor in a Leading Role: Gary Oldman – Darkest Hour as Winston Churchill; Jamie Bell – Film Stars Don't Die in Liverpool as Peter Turner; Timothée Chalamet – Call Me by Your Name as Elio Perlman; Daniel Day-Lewis – Phantom Thread as Reynolds Woodcock; Daniel Kaluuya – Get Out as Chris Washington	Best Actress in a Leading Role: Frances McDormand – Three Billboards Outside Ebbing, Missouri as Mildred Hayes; Annette Bening – Film Stars Don't Die in Liverpool as Gloria Grahame; Sally Hawkins – The Shape of Water as Elisa Esposito; Margot Robbie – I, Tonya as Tonya Harding; Saoirse Ronan – Lady Bird as Christine McPherson
Best Actor in a Supporting Role: Sam Rockwell – Three Billboards Outside Ebbing, Missouri as Jason Dixon; Willem Dafoe – The Florida Project as Bobby Hicks; Hugh Grant – Paddington 2 as Phoenix Buchanan; Woody Harrelson – Three Billboards Outside Ebbing, Missouri as Bill Willoughby; Christopher Plummer – All the Money in the World as J. Paul Getty	Best Actress in a Supporting Role: Allison Janney – I, Tonya as LaVona Golden; Lesley Manville – Phantom Thread as Cyril Woodcock; Laurie Metcalf – Lady Bird as Marion McPherson; Kristin Scott Thomas – Darkest Hour as Clementine Churchill; Octavia Spencer – The Shape of Water as Zelda Delilah Fuller
Best Original Screenplay: Three Billboards Outside Ebbing, Missouri – Martin McDonagh; Get Out – Jordan Peele; I, Tonya – Steven Rogers; Lady Bird – Greta Gerwig; The Shape of Water – Guillermo del Toro and Vanessa Taylor	Best Adapted Screenplay: Call Me by Your Name – James Ivory; The Death of Stalin – Armando Iannucci, Ian Martin and David Schneider; Film Stars Don't Die in Liverpool – Matt Greenhalgh; Molly's Game – Aaron Sorkin; Paddington 2 – Simon Farnaby and Paul King
Best Cinematography: Blade Runner 2049 – Roger Deakins; Darkest Hour – Bruno Delbonnel; Dunkirk – Hoyte van Hoytema; The Shape of Water – Dan Laustsen; Three Billboards Outside Ebbing, Missouri – Ben Davis	Best Costume Design: Phantom Thread – Mark Bridges; Beauty and the Beast – Jacqueline Durran; Darkest Hour – Jacqueline Durran; I, Tonya – Jennifer Johnson; The Shape of Water – Luis Sequeira
Best Editing: Baby Driver – Jonathan Amos and Paul Machliss; Blade Runner 2049 – Joe Walker; Dunkirk – Lee Smith; The Shape of Water – Sidney Wolinsky; Three Billboards Outside Ebbing, Missouri – Jon Gregory	Best Makeup and Hair: Darkest Hour – David Malinowski, Ivana Primorac, Lucy Sibbick and Kazu Hiro; Blade Runner 2049 – Donald Mowat and Kerry Warn; I, Tonya – Deborah La Mia Denaver and Adruitha Lee; Victoria & Abdul – Daniel Phillips and Lou Sheppard; Wonder – Naomi Bakstad, Robert Pandini and Arjen Tuiten
Best Original Music: The Shape of Water – Alexandre Desplat; Blade Runner 2049 – Benjamin Wallfisch and Hans Zimmer; Darkest Hour – Dario Marianelli; Dunkirk – Hans Zimmer; Phantom Thread – Jonny Greenwood	Best Production Design: The Shape of Water – Paul Denham Austerberry, Jeff Melvin and Shane Vieau; Beauty and the Beast – Sarah Greenwood and Katie Spencer; Blade Runner 2049 – Dennis Gassner and Alessandra Querzola; Darkest Hour – Sarah Greenwood and Katie Spencer; Dunkirk – Nathan Crowley and Gary Fettis
Best Sound: Dunkirk – Alex Gibson, Richard King, Gregg Landaker, Gary Rizzo and Mark Weingarten; Baby Driver – Tim Cavagin, Mary H. Ellis, Dan Morgan, Jeremy Price and Julian Slater; Blade Runner 2049 – Ron Bartlett, Theo Green, Doug Hemphill, Mark Mangini and Mac Ruth; The Shape of Water – Christian Cooke, Nelson Ferreira, Glen Gauthier, Nathan Robitaille and Brad Zoern; Star Wars: The Last Jedi – Ren Klyce, David Parker, Michael Semanick, Stuart Wilson and Matthew Wood	Best Special Visual Effects: Blade Runner 2049 – Richard R. Hoover, Paul Lambert, Gerd Nefzer and John Nelson; Dunkirk – Paul Corbould, Scott R. Fisher, Andrew Jackson and Andrew Lockley; The Shape of Water – Dennis Berardi, Trey Harrell, Mike Hill and Kevin Scott; Star Wars: The Last Jedi – Stephen Aplin, Chris Corbould, Ben Morris and Neal Scanlan; War for the Planet of the Apes – Daniel Barrett, Dan Lemmon, Joe Letteri and Joel Whist
Outstanding British Film: Three Billboards Outside Ebbing, Missouri – Martin McDonagh, Graham Broadbent and Peter Czernin; Darkest Hour – Joe Wright, Tim Bevan, Lisa Bruce, Eric Fellner, Anthony McCarten and Douglas Urbanski; The Death of Stalin – Armando Iannucci, Kevin Loader, Laurent Zeitoun, Yann Zenou, Ian Martin and David Schneider; God's Own Country – Francis Lee, Manon Ardisson and Jack Tarling; Lady Macbeth – William Oldroyd, Fodhla Cronin O'Reilly and Alice Birch; Paddington 2 – Paul King, David Heyman and Simon Farnaby	Outstanding Debut by a British Writer, Director or Producer: I Am Not a Witch – Rungano Nyoni (Writer/Director) and Emily Morgan (Producer); The Ghoul – Gareth Tunley (Writer/Director/Producer), Jack Healy Guttmann and Tom Meeten (Producer); Jawbone – Johnny Harris (Writer/Producer) and Thomas Napper (Director); Kingdom of Us – Lucy Cohen (Director); Lady Macbeth – Alice Birch (Writer), William Oldroyd (Director) and Fodhla Cronin O'Reilly (Producer)
Best Short Animation: Poles Apart – Paloma Baeza and Ser En Low; Have Heart – Will Anderson; Mamoon – Ben Steer	Best Short Film: Cowboy Dave – Colin O'Toole and Jonas Mortensen; Aamir – Vika Evdokimenko, Emma Stone and Oliver Shuster; A Drowning Man – Mahdi Fleifel, Signe Byrge Sørensen and Patrick Campbell; Work – Aneil Karia and Scott O'Donnell; Wren Boys – Harry Lighton, Sorcha Bacon and John Fitzpatrick
Best Animated Film: Coco – Lee Unkrich and Darla K. Anderson; Loving Vincent – Dorota Kobiela, Hugh Welchman and Ivan Mactaggart; My Life as a Courgette – Claude Barras and Max Karli	Best Documentary: I Am Not Your Negro – Raoul Peck; City of Ghosts – Matthew Heineman; Icarus – Bryan Fogel and Dan Cogan; An Inconvenient Sequel: Truth to Power – Bonni Cohen and Jon Shenk; Jane – Brett Morgen and Bryan Burk
Best Film Not in the English Language: The Handmaiden – Park Chan-wook and Syd Lim; Elle – Paul Verhoeven and Saïd Ben Saïd; First They Killed My Father – Angelina Jolie and Rithy Panh; Loveless – Andrey Zvyagintsev and Alexander Rodnyansky; The Salesman – Asghar Farhadi and Alexandre Mallet-Guy	Rising Star Award: Daniel Kaluuya; Timothée Chalamet; Josh O'Connor; Florence Pugh; Tessa Thompson

== Statistics ==
Films that received multiple nominations
Nominations	Film
12	The Shape of Water
9	Darkest Hour
9	Three Billboards Outside Ebbing, Missouri
8	Blade Runner 2049
8	Dunkirk
5	I, Tonya
4	Call Me by Your Name
4	Phantom Thread
3	Film Stars Don't Die in Liverpool
3	Lady Bird
3	Paddington 2
2	Baby Driver
2	Beauty and the Beast
2	The Death of Stalin
2	Get Out
2	Lady Macbeth
2	Star Wars: The Last Jedi

Films that received multiple awards
Awards	Film
5	Three Billboards Outside Ebbing, Missouri
3	The Shape of Water
2	Blade Runner 2049
2	Darkest Hour

== Presenters ==
The following individuals presented awards at the ceremony:

- Jennifer Lawrence presented Outstanding British Film
- Margot Robbie and Octavia Spencer presented EE Rising Star Award
- Sergei Polunin and Gemma Chan presented Best Original Music and Best Hair and Makeup
- Edward Holcroft and Tom Taylor presented Best Costume Design and Best Animated Film
- Hayley Squires and Natalie Dormer presented Best Editing
- Celia Imrie presented the Outstanding British Contribution to Cinema
- Anya Taylor-Joy and Letitia Wright presented Best Short Animation and Best Short Film
- Andrea Riseborough presented Best Film Not in the English Language
- Gugu Mbatha-Raw and Orlando Bloom presented Best Adapted Screenplay
- Lupita Nyong'o presented Best Actor in a Supporting Role
- Rebecca Ferguson and Toby Jones presented Best Production Design
- Karen Gillan and Taron Egerton presented Best Special Visual Effects
- Lily James and Gemma Arterton presented Outstanding Debut by a British Writer, Director or Producer
- Bryan Cranston presented Best Actress in a Supporting Role
- Sam Claflin and Will Poulter presented Best Sound
- Rachel Weisz and Nicholas Hoult presented Best Original Screenplay
- Dennis Quaid presented Best Cinematography
- Salma Hayek presented Best Actor in a Leading Role
- Chiwetel Ejiofor presented Best Actress in a Leading Role
- Naomie Harris and Patrick Stewart presented Best Director
- Daniel Craig presented Best Film
- Prince William and Kenneth Branagh presented the BAFTA Fellowship

== In Memoriam ==
- Jerry Lewis
- John G. Avildsen
- Allison Shearmur
- Walter Lassally
- Martin Landau
- Johann Johannsson
- John Mollo
- Shashi Kapoor
- Jeanne Moreau
- Alan MacDonald
- John Heyman
- Ray Merrin
- Michael Ballhaus
- Bill Butler
- George A. Romero
- Jonathan Demme
- Terence Marsh
- Bill Paxton
- Pamela Engel
- Sam Shepard
- Harry Dean Stanton
- Jill Messick
- Tobe Hooper
- Steve Christian
- Omid Nooshin
- Roger Moore

== See also ==
- 7th AACTA International Awards
- 90th Academy Awards
- 43rd César Awards
- 23rd Critics' Choice Awards
- 70th Directors Guild of America Awards
- 31st European Film Awards
- 75th Golden Globe Awards
- 38th Golden Raspberry Awards
- 32nd Goya Awards
- 33rd Independent Spirit Awards
- 23rd Lumière Awards
- 8th Magritte Awards
- 5th Platino Awards
- 29th Producers Guild of America Awards
- 22nd Satellite Awards
- 44th Saturn Awards
- 24th Screen Actors Guild Awards
- 70th Writers Guild of America Awards
