= List of accolades received by I, Tonya =

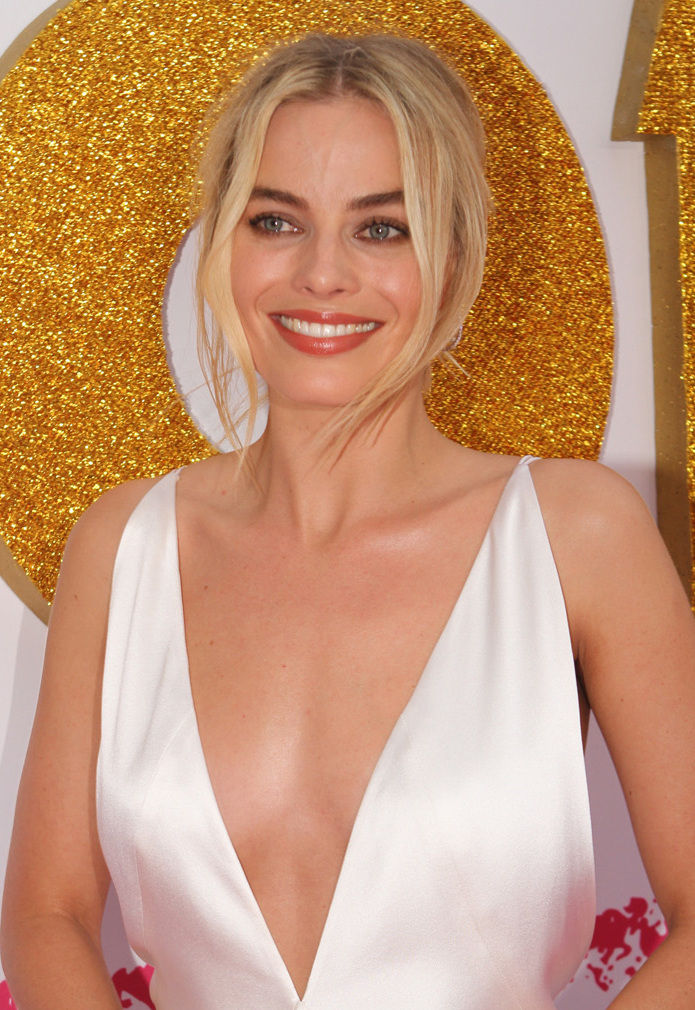
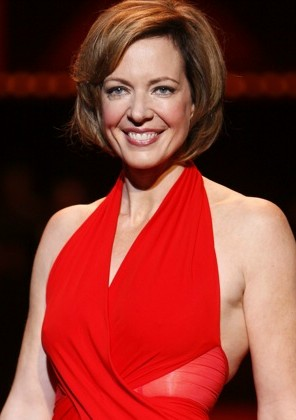
- Margot Robbie (left) and Allison Janney (right) earned several awards and nominations for their portrayals of Tonya Harding and LaVona Golden, respectively
Awards and nominations
Award	Won	Nominated
AACTA International Awards	2	3
AARP's Movies for Grownups Awards	0	3
Academy Awards	1	3
Alliance of Women Film Journalists	1	3
American Cinema Editors	1	1
Austin Film Critics Association	2	3
Boston Society of Film Critics	2	2
British Academy Film Awards	1	5
Casting Society of America	0	1
Chicago Film Critics Association	0	2
Costume Designers Guild	1	1
Critics Choice Awards	2	5
Dallas–Fort Worth Film Critics Association	3	3
Detroit Film Critics Society	1	2
Dorian Awards	0	3
Florida Film Critics Circle	2	3
Georgia Film Critics Association	0	2
Golden Globe Awards	1	3
Gotham Awards	0	3
Guild of Music Supervisors Awards	0	1
Hollywood Film Awards	2	2
Houston Film Critics Society	1	2
Independent Spirit Awards	2	3
IndieWire Critics Poll	1	1
London Film Critics Circle	0	1
Los Angeles Film Critics Association	1	1
Make-Up Artists and Hair Stylists Guild	1	2
Mill Valley Film Festival	1	1
National Society of Film Critics	1	1
New York Film Critics Online	3	3
Online Film Critics Society	1	3
Palm Springs International Film Festival	1	1
Producers Guild of America Awards	0	1
San Diego Film Critics Society	1	2
San Francisco Film Critics Circle	1	2
Santa Barbara International Film Festival	1	1
Satellite Awards	0	3
Saturn Awards	0	1
Screen Actors Guild Awards	1	2
Seattle Film Critics Society	0	2
Toronto Film Critics Association	1	1
Toronto International Film Festival	1	1
Vancouver Film Critics Circle	1	1
Washington D.C. Area Film Critics Association	0	2
Women Film Critics Circle	2	3
Writers Guild of America Awards	0	1
- Total number of awards and nominations^{[I]}
Totals	44	96
- References

I, Tonya is a 2017 American biographical sports mockumentary black comedy film directed by Craig Gillespie, and written by Steven Rogers. The plot follows the life and career of American figure skater Tonya Harding (Margot Robbie), with particular focus on her connection to the 1994 attack on her skating rival and Olympic teammate Nancy Kerrigan. Sebastian Stan plays the supporting role of Harding's husband, Jeff Gillooly, and Allison Janney as her mother LaVona Golden. I, Tonya had its world premiere at the 2017 Toronto International Film Festival on September 8, and was released in the United States on December 8.

I, Tonya garnered awards and nominations in a variety of categories following its release, with particular praise for the film itself, Tatiana S. Riegel's editing, and the acting performances of Robbie and Janney. At the 7th AACTA International Awards, the film received three nominations and went on to win Best Actress for Robbie and Best Supporting Actress for Janney. For her work on the film, Riegel won the American Cinema Editors Award for Best Edited Feature Film – Comedy or Musical. Robbie, Janney and Riegel all earned nominations for their work at the 90th Academy Awards. The 71st British Academy Film Awards saw the film garner five nominations, including Best Original Screenplay for Rogers, Best Actress in a Leading Role for Robbie and Best Actress in a Supporting Role for Janney. At the 23rd Critics' Choice Awards, I, Tonya earned five nominations including Best Comedy. Janney won Best Supporting Actress, while Robbie won Best Actress in a Comedy.

Costume designer Jennifer Johnson received a nomination for her work at the 20th Costume Designers Guild Awards. The film gathered three nominations from the 75th Golden Globe Awards, with Janney winning Best Supporting Actress in a Motion Picture. The 33rd Independent Spirit Awards saw I, Tonya nominated in the Best Editing, Best Female Lead and Best Supporting Female categories. Producers Bryan Unkeless, Steven Rogers, Robbie, and Tom Ackerley received a nomination for the Producers Guild of America Award for Best Theatrical Motion Picture. At the 22nd Satellite Awards, I, Tonya was nominated for Best Film, Best Actress for Robbie and Best Supporting Actress for Janney. Both actresses garnered nominations at the 24th Screen Actors Guild Awards. Rogers also received a nomination for the Writers Guild of America Award for Best Original Screenplay.

== Awards and nominations ==
Award/Festival	Date of ceremony^{[II]}	Category	Recipients	Result	Ref.
AACTA International Awards	January 6, 2018	Best Actress	Margot Robbie	Won	
AACTA International Awards	January 6, 2018	Best Direction	Craig Gillespie	Nominated	
AACTA International Awards	January 6, 2018	Best Supporting Actress	Allison Janney	Won	
AARP's Movies for Grownups Awards	February 5, 2018	Best Screenwriter	Steven Rogers	Nominated	
AARP's Movies for Grownups Awards	February 5, 2018	Best Supporting Actress	Allison Janney	Nominated	
AARP's Movies for Grownups Awards	February 5, 2018	Best Time Capsule	I, Tonya	Nominated	
Academy Awards	March 4, 2018	Best Actress	Margot Robbie	Nominated	
Academy Awards	March 4, 2018	Best Supporting Actress	Allison Janney	Won	
Academy Awards	March 4, 2018	Best Film Editing	Tatiana S. Riegel	Nominated	
Alliance of Women Film Journalists	January 9, 2018	Best Actress	Margot Robbie	Nominated	
Alliance of Women Film Journalists	January 9, 2018	Best Actress in a Supporting Role	Allison Janney	Nominated	
Alliance of Women Film Journalists	January 9, 2018	Bravest Performance	Margot Robbie	Won^{[III]}	
American Cinema Editors	January 26, 2018	Best Edited Feature Film – Comedy or Musical	Tatiana S. Riegel	Won	
Austin Film Critics Association	January 8, 2018	Best Actress	Margot Robbie	Nominated	
Austin Film Critics Association	January 8, 2018	Best Supporting Actress	Allison Janney	Won	
Austin Film Critics Association	January 8, 2018	Top Ten Films	I, Tonya	Won	
British Academy Film Awards	February 18, 2018	Best Actress in a Leading Role	Margot Robbie	Nominated	
British Academy Film Awards	February 18, 2018	Best Costume Design	Jennifer Johnson	Nominated	
British Academy Film Awards	February 18, 2018	Best Makeup and Hair	Deborah La Mia Denaver and Adruitha Lee	Nominated	
British Academy Film Awards	February 18, 2018	Best Original Screenplay	Steven Rogers	Nominated	
British Academy Film Awards	February 18, 2018	Best Actress in a Supporting Role	Allison Janney	Won	
Boston Society of Film Critics	December 10, 2017	Best Editing	Tatiana S. Riegel	Runner-up	
Boston Society of Film Critics	December 10, 2017	Best Supporting Actress	Allison Janney	Runner-up	
Casting Society of America	January 18, 2018	Studio or Independent Comedy	Tara Feldstein Bennett, Lindsay Graham, Chase Paris and Mary Vernieu	Nominated	
Chicago Film Critics Association	December 12, 2017	Best Actress	Margot Robbie	Nominated	
Chicago Film Critics Association	December 12, 2017	Best Supporting Actress	Allison Janney	Nominated	
Costume Designers Guild	February 20, 2018	Excellence in Contemporary Film	Jennifer Johnson	Won	
Critics' Choice Movie Awards	January 11, 2018	Best Actress	Margot Robbie	Nominated	
Critics' Choice Movie Awards	January 11, 2018	Best Actress in a Comedy	Margot Robbie	Won	
Critics' Choice Movie Awards	January 11, 2018	Best Comedy	I, Tonya	Nominated	
Critics' Choice Movie Awards	January 11, 2018	Best Hair and Makeup	I, Tonya	Nominated	
Critics' Choice Movie Awards	January 11, 2018	Best Supporting Actress	Allison Janney	Won	
Dallas–Fort Worth Film Critics Association	December 13, 2017	Best Actress	Margot Robbie	3rd Place	
Dallas–Fort Worth Film Critics Association	December 13, 2017	Best Film	I, Tonya	8th Place	
Dallas–Fort Worth Film Critics Association	December 13, 2017	Best Supporting Actress	Allison Janney	Won	
Detroit Film Critics Society	December 7, 2017	Best Actress	Margot Robbie	Nominated	
Detroit Film Critics Society	December 7, 2017	Best Supporting Actress	Allison Janney	Won	
Dorian Awards	January 31, 2018	Campy Flick of the Year	I, Tonya	Nominated	
Dorian Awards	January 31, 2018	Film Performance of the Year – Actress	Margot Robbie	Nominated	
Dorian Awards	January 31, 2018	Supporting Film Performance of the Year – Actress	Allison Janney	Nominated	
Florida Film Critics Circle	December 23, 2017	Best Actress	Margot Robbie	Won	
Florida Film Critics Circle	December 23, 2017	Best Cast	The cast of I, Tonya	Nominated	
Florida Film Critics Circle	December 23, 2017	Best Supporting Actress	Allison Janney	Won	
Georgia Film Critics Association	January 12, 2018	Best Actress	Margot Robbie	Nominated	
Georgia Film Critics Association	January 12, 2018	Best Supporting Actress	Allison Janney	Nominated	
Golden Globe Awards	January 7, 2018	Best Actress – Motion Picture Musical or Comedy	Margot Robbie	Nominated	
Golden Globe Awards	January 7, 2018	Best Motion Picture – Musical or Comedy	I, Tonya	Nominated	
Golden Globe Awards	January 7, 2018	Best Supporting Actress – Motion Picture	Allison Janney	Won	
Gotham Awards	November 27, 2017	Best Actress	Margot Robbie	Nominated	
Gotham Awards	November 27, 2017	Best Feature	I, Tonya	Nominated	
Gotham Awards	November 27, 2017	Audience Award	I, Tonya	Nominated	
Guild of Music Supervisors Awards	February 8, 2018	Best Music Supervision for Film: Budgeted Under 25 Million Dollars	Susan Jacobs and Jen Moss	Nominated	
Hollywood Film Awards	November 5, 2017	Hollywood Ensemble Award	The cast of I, Tonya	Won	
Hollywood Film Awards	November 5, 2017	Hollywood Supporting Actress Award	Allison Janney	Won	
Houston Film Critics Society	January 6, 2018	Best Actress	Margot Robbie	Nominated	
Houston Film Critics Society	January 6, 2018	Best Supporting Actress	Allison Janney	Won	
Independent Spirit Awards	March 3, 2018	Best Editing	Tatiana S. Riegel	Won	
Independent Spirit Awards	March 3, 2018	Best Female Lead	Margot Robbie	Nominated	
Independent Spirit Awards	March 3, 2018	Best Supporting Female	Allison Janney	Won	
IndieWire Critics Poll	December 19, 2017	Best Supporting Actress	Allison Janney	3rd Place	
London Film Critics Circle	January 28, 2018	Supporting Actress of the Year	Allison Janney	Nominated	
Los Angeles Film Critics Association	January 13, 2018	Best Editing	Tatiana S. Riegel	Runner-up	
Make-Up Artists and Hair Stylists Guild	February 24, 2018	Best Period and/or Character Hair	Adruitha Lee and Mary Everett	Won	
Make-Up Artists and Hair Stylists Guild	February 24, 2018	Best Period and/or Character Make-up	Deborah La Mia Denaver, Teresa Vest, Bill Myer	Nominated	
Mill Valley Film Festival	December 2, 2017	Mill Valley Film Festival Award	Allison Janney and Margot Robbie	Won	
National Society of Film Critics	January 6, 2018	Best Supporting Actress	Allison Janney	3rd Place	
New York Film Critics Online	December 10, 2017	Best Actress	Margot Robbie	Won	
New York Film Critics Online	December 10, 2017	Best Supporting Actress	Allison Janney	Won	
New York Film Critics Online	December 10, 2017	Top 10 Films	I, Tonya	Won	
Online Film Critics Society	December 28, 2017	Best Actress	Margot Robbie	Nominated	
Online Film Critics Society	December 28, 2017	Best Editing	Tatiana S. Riegel	Nominated	
Online Film Critics Society	December 28, 2017	Best Supporting Actress	Allison Janney	Runner-up	
Palm Springs International Film Festival	January 2, 2018	Spotlight Award – Actress	Allison Janney	Won	
Producers Guild of America Awards	January 20, 2018	Best Theatrical Motion Picture	Bryan Unkeless, Steven Rogers, Margot Robbie, and Tom Ackerley	Nominated	
San Diego Film Critics Society	December 11, 2017	Best Actress	Margot Robbie	Nominated	
San Diego Film Critics Society	December 11, 2017	Best Supporting Actress	Allison Janney	Won^{[IIII]}	
San Francisco Film Critics Circle	December 10, 2017	Best Actress	Margot Robbie	Won	
San Francisco Film Critics Circle	December 10, 2017	Best Supporting Actress	Allison Janney	Nominated	
Santa Barbara International Film Festival	February 8, 2018	Outstanding Performer of the Year Award	Allison Janney and Margot Robbie	Won	
Satellite Awards	February 11, 2018	Best Actress	Margot Robbie	Nominated	
Satellite Awards	February 11, 2018	Best Film	I, Tonya	Nominated	
Satellite Awards	February 11, 2018	Best Supporting Actress	Allison Janney	Nominated	
Saturn Awards	June 27, 2018	Best Independent Film	I, Tonya	Nominated	
Screen Actors Guild Awards	January 21, 2018	Outstanding Performance by a Female Actor in a Leading Role	Margot Robbie	Nominated	
Screen Actors Guild Awards	January 21, 2018	Outstanding Performance by a Female Actor in a Supporting Role	Allison Janney	Won	
Seattle Film Critics Society	December 18, 2017	Best Actress	Margot Robbie	Nominated	
Seattle Film Critics Society	December 18, 2017	Best Supporting Actress	Allison Janney	Nominated	
Toronto Film Critics Association	December 10, 2017	Best Supporting Actress	Allison Janney	Runner-up	
Toronto International Film Festival	September 17, 2017	People's Choice Award	I, Tonya	2nd Place	
Vancouver Film Critics Circle	January 6, 2018	Best Supporting Actress	Allison Janney	Nominated	
Washington D.C. Area Film Critics Association	December 8, 2017	Best Actress	Margot Robbie	Nominated	
Washington D.C. Area Film Critics Association	December 8, 2017	Best Supporting Actress	Allison Janney	Nominated	
Women Film Critics Circle	December 22, 2017	Best Comedic Actress	Allison Janney	Won	
Women Film Critics Circle	December 22, 2017	Best Comedic Actress	Margot Robbie	Nominated	
Women Film Critics Circle	December 22, 2017	Mommie Dearest Worst Screen Mom of the Year	Allison Janney	Won	
Writers Guild of America Awards	February 11, 2018	Best Original Screenplay	Steven Rogers	Nominated	

== Notes ==
^{^[I]} Certain award groups do not simply award one winner. They recognize several different recipients and have runners-up. Since this is a specific recognition and is different from losing an award, runner-up mentions are considered wins in this award tally.

^{^[II]} Each date is linked to the article about the awards held that year, wherever possible.

^{^[III]} Tied with Sally Hawkins for The Shape of Water

^{^[IIII]} Tied with Laurie Metcalf for Lady Bird
