= Film Stars Don't Die in Liverpool =

2017 biographical romantic drama film by Paul McGuigan

- British release poster
- Directed by: Paul McGuigan
- Screenplay by: Matt Greenhalgh
- Based on: Film Stars Don't Die in Liverpool by Peter Turner
- Produced by: Barbara Broccoli; Colin Vaines
- Starring: Annette Bening; Jamie Bell; Vanessa Redgrave; Julie Walters; Kenneth Cranham; Stephen Graham; Frances Barber; Leanne Best
- Cinematography: Urszula Pontikos
- Edited by: Nick Emerson
- Music by: J. Ralph
- Production companies: Eon Productions; Danjaq LLC; IM Global; Synchronistic Pictures
- Distributed by: Lionsgate (United Kingdom); Sony Pictures Classics (United States)
- Release dates: 1 September 2017 (Telluride); 16 November 2017 (United Kingdom); 29 December 2017 (United States)
- Running time: 106 minutes
- Countries: United Kingdom; United States
- Language: English
- Budget: $10 million
- Box office: $3.9 million

Film Stars Don't Die in Liverpool is a 2017 biographical romantic drama film directed by Paul McGuigan and starring Annette Bening and Jamie Bell, with Vanessa Redgrave and Julie Walters. It is based on the memoir of the same name by Peter Turner, which tells of his relationship with American actress Gloria Grahame in 1970s Liverpool and, some years later, her death from stomach cancer.

The film premiered at the Telluride Film Festival on 1 September 2017. It was released in the United Kingdom on 16 November by Lionsgate and in the United States on 29 December by Sony Pictures Classics. At the 71st British Academy Film Awards, it received three nominations: Best Actress (Bening), Best Actor (Bell) and Best Adapted Screenplay. The film received generally positive reviews.

== Plot ==
Opening in October 1981, Gloria Grahame is playing the lead role, Amanda, in The Glass Menagerie in Lancaster and falls ill. She calls upon a former lover, Peter Turner, who reluctantly takes her to his parents' home in Liverpool to recuperate.

Flashing back to 1979, in the twilight of her once prolific and Academy Award-winning career, Gloria is playing the role of Sadie in W. Somerset Maugham's Rain in London and asks another tenant at her boarding house—Peter—to practise dancing disco with her. Gloria is flirtatious with Peter, who is also an actor. They see Alien together, have a drink together afterwards, and strike up a friendship. After an argument, their relationship becomes intimate, despite their noticeable age difference.

In October 1981, Peter's parents are still expressing support for Peter and Gloria's friendship. Peter and his parents acknowledge that Gloria needs more attentive medical attention for whatever is ailing her. However, Gloria insists that her illness is not serious.

In 1979, Peter visits Gloria in Los Angeles and their romance continues at Gloria's modest Malibu trailer park home. Gloria's mother, Jeanne, demonstrates support for Peter and Gloria's romance, but Gloria's older sister, Joy, is hostile. Both encourage Peter not to marry Gloria, given Gloria's earlier and scandalous marriage to her former stepson Anthony Ray, who was also significantly her junior. Peter and Gloria reveal to each other that they have both experimented with same-sex attraction.

In October 1981, upon contacting Gloria's doctor in Lancaster, Peter learns that Gloria's breast cancer has returned after initial remission in 1975. Gloria has refused any further treatment. Peter eventually confronts Gloria with what he knows, but Gloria insists she will get better. Peter reluctantly shares the prognosis with his family, Gloria's hosts. Peter tells his friend Eileen that he still loves Gloria.

In 1979, Gloria and Peter's romance continues until the spring of 1981, and Peter spends time with Gloria in New York City, including a visit from Eileen. Gloria invites Peter to live with her in America full-time. However, shortly thereafter, Gloria suddenly cools to the relationship without explanation, distancing herself from Peter. Gloria kicks him out of her New York City apartment, and he returns to Liverpool for an acting job in an Alan Bleasdale play.

It is revealed that Gloria's sudden change of heart in New York City was driven by her learning that her cancer had returned. Her earlier refusal of chemotherapy in 1975 has contributed to the cancer's return. Her distance from Peter and keeping of secrets was because of ongoing tests and doctor appointments. She does not share this with Peter and instead hopes to drive him away as the cancer is diagnosed as terminal.

In October 1981, Peter struggles with his family on how to approach care of Gloria. As she becomes increasingly weak, Gloria decides to allow Peter to inform her family of her illness. Peter surprises Gloria by taking her to a theatre to read from Romeo and Juliet (a scene in which the real actor Peter Turner makes a cameo appearance as stagehand Jack). They reconcile. Gloria's oldest son Timothy arrives from the U.S. to assist Gloria in returning home. Peter gently packs her belongings as Gloria sleeps. Gloria says goodbye to Peter and his family and departs for the U.S. They share a final kiss.

The film concludes with footage of Gloria winning the Academy Award for Best Supporting Actress for her portrayal of Rosemary Bartlow in The Bad and the Beautiful at the 25th Academy Awards.

== Cast ==
- Annette Bening as Gloria Grahame
- Jamie Bell as Peter Turner
- Julie Walters as Bella Turner
- Kenneth Cranham as Joe Turner
- Stephen Graham as Joe Turner Jr.
- Vanessa Redgrave as Jeanne McDougall
- Frances Barber as Joy Hallward
- Leanne Best as Eileen
- Isabella Laughland as Vanessa
- Suzanne Bertish as Fifi Oscard
- Tom Brittney as Tim

== Production ==
On 6 May 2016, it was reported that Annette Bening, Jamie Bell, and Julie Walters would star in an adaptation of Film Stars Don't Die in Liverpool by Peter Turner, a memoir about Turner's relationship with actress Gloria Grahame in the last years of her life. Paul McGuigan would direct from a script written by Matt Greenhalgh, and Barbara Broccoli and Colin Vaines would produce. On 27 June 2016, Vanessa Redgrave joined the cast.

On 27 June 2016, the film began filming in Liverpool and London. It then moved to Pinewood Studios, where it wrapped on 8 August 2016. To fill in for scenes set in New York City and Malibu, California, the crew used rear-screen projections. On 11 November 2017, Elvis Costello released an original song entitled "You Shouldn't Look at Me That Way", composed specifically for the film.

Production company Eon Productions is best known for producing the James Bond film franchise; Film Stars Don't Die in Liverpool was the second non-Bond film to be released under the Eon banner since Call Me Bwana (1963).

== Release ==
In August 2017, Sony Pictures Classics acquired distribution rights to the film for North America, Eastern Europe, Germany and Asia pay TV. The film had its world premiere at the Telluride Film Festival on 1 September 2017. It also screened at the Toronto International Film Festival on 9 September 2017.

The film was released in the United Kingdom on 16 November 2017 by Lionsgate and in the United States on 29 December 2017.

== Reception ==
=== Box office ===
Film Stars Don't Die in Liverpool grossed $1 million in North America and $2.9 million in other territories, for a worldwide total of $4 million, against a budget of $10 million.

=== Critical response ===
On review aggregator Rotten Tomatoes, the film holds an approval rating of 81% based on 164 reviews, with an average rating of 6.7/10. The website's critical consensus reads, "Film Stars Don't Die in Liverpool showcases brilliant work from Annette Bening, whose performance is more than enough to outweigh this biopic's basic narrative." On Metacritic, the film has a score of 65 out of 100, based on 34 critics, indicating "generally favorable" reviews.

== Accolades ==
Award	Ceremony date	Category	Recipients	Result	Ref.
Hollywood Film Awards	6 November 2017	New Hollywood Award	Jamie Bell	Won	
British Independent Film Awards	10 December 2017	Best Actor	Jamie Bell	Nominated	
British Independent Film Awards	10 December 2017	Best Casting	Debbie McWilliams	Nominated	
British Independent Film Awards	10 December 2017	Best Production Design	Eve Stewart	Nominated	
British Independent Film Awards	10 December 2017	Best Supporting Actress	Julie Walters	Nominated	
San Francisco Film Critics Circle	10 December 2017	Best Actress	Annette Bening	Nominated	
London Film Critics Circle	28 January 2018	Actress of the Year	Annette Bening	Nominated	
AARP's Movies for Grownups Awards	5 February 2018	Best Actress	Annette Bening	Won	
AARP's Movies for Grownups Awards	5 February 2018	Best Grownup Love Story	Film Stars Don't Die in Liverpool	Nominated	
Women's Image Network Awards	6 February 2018	Best Feature Film	Film Stars Don't Die in Liverpool	Nominated	
Women's Image Network Awards	6 February 2018	Best Actress in a Feature Film	Annette Bening	Nominated	
Evening Standard British Film Awards	8 February 2018	Best Actor	Jamie Bell	Nominated	
Evening Standard British Film Awards	8 February 2018	Technical Achievement	Eve Stewart	Nominated	
Guild of Music Supervisors Awards	8 February 2018	Best Music Supervision for Film: Budgeted Under 10 Million Dollars	Ian Neil	Nominated	
British Academy Film Awards	18 February 2018	Best Actor in a Leading Role	Jamie Bell	Nominated	
British Academy Film Awards	18 February 2018	Best Actress in a Leading Role	Annette Bening	Nominated	
British Academy Film Awards	18 February 2018	Best Adapted Screenplay	Matt Greenhalgh	Nominated	
