= Elizabeth Nel =

Personal Secretary to Winston Churchill

Elizabeth Shakespear Nel
- Born: Elizabeth Shakespear Layton; 14 June 1917; Bury St Edmunds, England
- Died: 30 October 2007 (aged 90); Port Elizabeth, South Africa
- Known for: Secretary to Winston Churchill
- Notable work: Mr. Churchill's Secretary (1958)
- Spouse: Frans Nel
- Children: 3

Elizabeth Shakespear Nel (née Layton; 14 June 1917 – 30 October 2007) was a personal secretary to Winston Churchill from 1941 to 1945, during the Second World War.

== Biography ==
Elizabeth Layton was born on 14 June 1917 in Bury St Edmunds, Suffolk. Her father, a veteran of the First World War, suffered from tuberculosis. He was advised because of his health to emigrate to either British Columbia or Australia. The family moved to Canada and settled in Vernon, British Columbia.

She attended a secretarial college in London, before working at an employment bureau. In the summer of 1939, she returned to Canada on holiday. After training in air raid precautions, she returned to London, where she obtained work with the Red Cross. It was from here she was sent to Downing Street.

In late May 1941 at around 22:30, she first met Winston Churchill. She sat at a silent typewriter where she immediately fell foul of the Prime Minister by making a mistake. He liked his speeches typed in double-spaced lines as he dictated, but she used single spacing. She was ordered from the room as Churchill berated her, using the words "fool", "mug", and "idiot".

She accompanied Churchill as he travelled abroad in the war years. Layton met President Franklin D. Roosevelt while in Washington D.C., with Churchill at the White House. Another trip saw her as part of the British delegation to the Yalta Conference in the Crimea. Churchill proposed a toast to "Miss Layton" at a banquet during the conference. She was the only woman present. Her last work in wartime was to take dictation of Churchill's VE-Day speech.

She and Churchill wept in his room after his defeat in the 1945 general election. After the loss, Layton told the Churchills of her plans to marry Frans Nel. He was a South African soldier who had been released from a prisoner-of-war camp following his capture at Tobruk. Churchill and his wife Clementine, upon hearing the news, advised them to have four children, reciting together, "One for Mother, one for Father, one for Accidents and one for Increase." In 1946, her first child was born.

In 1958, she released a memoir titled Mr. Churchill's Secretary. Churchill initially objected to the publication, sending a telegram. However, his views softened and he removed his objection when the matter was broached again.

After the war, she emigrated with her husband to the Union of South Africa. In later years, she was invited back to London on several occasions, including in 1990 for the 50th anniversary of Churchill becoming prime minister. She also returned in 2005 to join Queen Elizabeth II for the opening of the Churchill museum in the underground Cabinet War Rooms, beneath what is now the Treasury on Horse Guards Road.

== Family ==
She had two siblings: a brother Michael and sister Alison. Her brother served as a pilot in the Second World War.

After the war, she married South African soldier Frans Nel and settled in Port Elizabeth. They had a son and two daughters. Her husband died in 2000.

== Film depiction ==
Nel is portrayed in the 2017 British film Darkest Hour by Lily James. She is portrayed as starting to work as Churchill's secretary on 10 May 1940 during the Battle of France. In reality, she did not become his secretary until a year later in May 1941. The movie also says her brother died during the retreat to Dunkirk, another fictional detail.

== See also ==
- Grace Hamblin
