= Lucy Sibbick =

British special effects make-up artist

Lucy Sibbick is a British special effects make-up artist. She is best known for her work on the film Darkest Hour for which she was awarded with Kazuhiro Tsuji and David Malinowski the Academy Award for Best Makeup and Hairstyling at the 90th Academy Awards. Lucy resides in the North West of England, with her husband Arie Dekker.
