= The Darkest Hour =

Phrase used to refer to World War II in 1940–1941

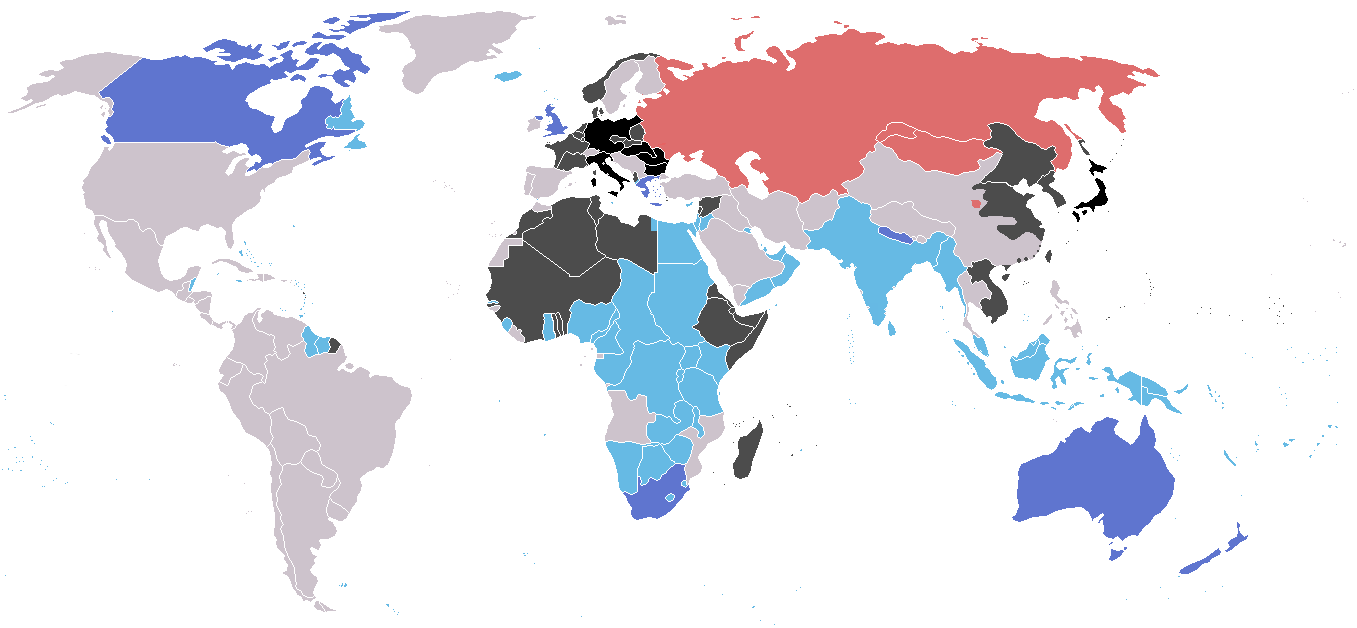
The world situation at the beginning of 1941, with colour-coding: Western Allies (independent countries) Western Allies (colonies or occupied) Comintern Axis (countries) Axis (colonies or occupied, including Vichy France) neutral

"The Darkest Hour" is a phrase used to refer to an early period of World War II, from approximately mid-1940 to mid-1941. While widely attributed to Winston Churchill, the origins of the phrase are unclear.

== The phrase ==
The phrase "the darkest hour" for this period, drawing on the proverb that "the darkest hour is just before the dawn", is usually ascribed to Winston Churchill, though there is no evidence he coined the phrase.

Churchill had used a similar phrase at the time, though at the time he was referring specifically to the situation of France rather than to the United Kingdom. In his 'finest hour' speech, on 18 June 1940, Churchill described the collapse of France following the German invasion as "the darkest hour in French history"; he had used similar terms when meeting with members of the Supreme War Council a week earlier. Writing after the war, in 1949, he described the period just before Dunkirk as "the darkest moment", and the period 1940–41 generally as "the darkest hours".

However, presumably due to the proverb, use of the phrase was widespread at the time. A little before Churchill's speech, it was being used to describe the current situation in sources as widely spread as the leader column of the Berwick Advertiser (30 May) and the New Zealand parliament (13 June). It is not clear when it became firmly associated with the United Kingdom specifically, or attributed to Churchill.

== Historical context ==
Following the Fall of France in June 1940, and the evacuation of the British Army from Dunkirk, the British Empire was the only major power fighting against the Axis powers in Europe. Through much of 1940, until victory in the Battle of Britain, the United Kingdom appeared to be under direct threat of invasion.

Although the British Empire was the only major power fighting the Germans and Italians during the period, it was not the only major power fighting the Axis as a whole. China had been engaging the Empire of Japan since 1937, when the Japanese launched an all-out invasion. Some minor powers were also fighting the Germans and Italians: Greece fought the Axis powers from October 1940, when it defeated the Italian troops, to June 1941, when Crete surrendered to the Germans. Both Winston Churchill and Charles de Gaulle praised Greece's exceptional heroism at a point that many peoples were subjugated and the Axis seemed unbeatable.

Three weeks after the end of the Battle of Crete, the Germany launched Operation Barbarossa, bringing the Soviet Union into the war. Britain formed an alliance with the Soviet Union in July, promising to cooperate in the war and also not to make a separate peace with Germany. Nonetheless, the final months of the year were marked by continual German successes that brought the German armies up to the gates of Moscow.

The United States did not formally become involved in the war on the Allied side until after the attack on Pearl Harbor by the Japanese on 7 December 1941. However, President Franklin D. Roosevelt clearly sympathized with Britain and other opponents of Germany, and he did what he could to quietly assist them within the confines of existing U.S. law, which mandated strict official neutrality, and in the face of strong isolationist sentiment, both among the public and Congress, which wanted the U.S. to stay out of the European and Asian conflicts. At Roosevelt's urging, a "cash-and-carry" provision allowed presidential approval of weapons sales to the belligerent nations, on the condition that the recipients both arranged for the transport and paid immediately with cash. The argument was that would not draw the U.S. into the conflict and so the provision was inserted into the Neutrality Act of 1937, which had been passed when war clouds were looming over Europe, and the Sino-Japanese conflict was already underway, and after the provision officially lapsed in 1939, it was re-inserted into the follow-up Neutrality Act of 1939.

Roosevelt believed that "cash-and-carry" would aid France and Great Britain in the event of a war with Germany since they were the only countries that controlled the seas and could take advantage of the provision. The U.S. officially dropped its pretense of neutrality with the passage of the Lend-Lease Act in March 1941 and openly allowed arms sales to Britain, Free France, China and later, the Soviet Union and other Allied states.

The phrase "The Darkest Hour" was used for the title of the 2017 film Darkest Hour, which starred Gary Oldman as Churchill and was set in May 1940.

== See also ==
- Phoney War – Initial period of low activity in World War II
