= 7th AACTA International Awards =

Australian film and TV awards ceremony in 2018

- Date: 5 January 2018 (ceremony date); 6 January 2018 (broadcast date)
- Site: The Avalon, Hollywood; Los Angeles, California, U.S.
- Hosted by: Daniel MacPherson

Highlights
- Best Film: Three Billboards Outside Ebbing, Missouri
- Most awards: Three Billboards Outside Ebbing, Missouri (3)
- Most nominations: Call Me by Your Name, Lady Bird, and Three Billboards Outside Ebbing, Missouri (5)

Television coverage
- Network: Foxtel Arts

The 7th Australian Academy of Cinema and Television Arts International Awards (commonly known as the AACTA International Awards is presented by the Australian Academy of Cinema and Television Arts (AACTA), a non-profit organisation whose aim is to identify, award, promote and celebrate Australia's greatest achievements in film and television. Awards were handed out for the best films of 2017 regardless of the country of origin, and are the international counterpart to the awards for Australian films. The awards were presented on 5 January 2018 at The Avalon in Hollywood.

== Nominees ==
The nominees were announced on 13 December 2017.

Best Film: Three Billboards Outside Ebbing, Missouri; Call Me by Your Name; Dunkirk; Lady Bird; The Shape of Water	Best Direction: Christopher Nolan – Dunkirk; Luca Guadagnino – Call Me by Your Name; Craig Gillespie – I, Tonya; Greta Gerwig – Lady Bird; Guillermo del Toro – The Shape of Water
Best Actor: Gary Oldman – Darkest Hour as Winston Churchill; Timothée Chalamet – Call Me by Your Name as Elio Perlman; Daniel Day-Lewis – Phantom Thread as Reynolds Woodcock; Hugh Jackman – Logan as James "Logan" Howlett / Wolverine; Daniel Kaluuya – Get Out as Chris Washington	Best Actress: Margot Robbie – I, Tonya as Tonya Harding; Judi Dench – Victoria & Abdul as Queen Victoria; Sally Hawkins – The Shape of Water as Elisa Esposito; Frances McDormand – Three Billboards Outside Ebbing, Missouri as Mildred Hayes; Saoirse Ronan – Lady Bird as Christine "Lady Bird" McPherson
Best Supporting Actor: Sam Rockwell – Three Billboards Outside Ebbing, Missouri as Officer Jason Dixon; Willem Dafoe – The Florida Project as Bobby Ricks; Armie Hammer – Call Me by Your Name as Oliver; Tom Hardy – Dunkirk as Farrier; Ben Mendelsohn – Darkest Hour as King George VI	Best Supporting Actress: Allison Janney – I, Tonya as LaVona Golden; Mary J. Blige – Mudbound as Florence Jackson; Abbie Cornish – Three Billboards Outside Ebbing, Missouri as Anne Willoughby; Nicole Kidman – The Killing Of A Sacred Deer as Anna Murphy; Laurie Metcalf – Lady Bird as Marion McPherson
Best Screenplay: Martin McDonagh – Three Billboards Outside Ebbing, Missouri; Luca Guadagnino – Call Me by Your Name; Christopher Nolan – Dunkirk; Jordan Peele – Get Out; Greta Gerwig – Lady Bird

== See also ==
- 24th Screen Actors Guild Awards
- 23rd Critics' Choice Awards
- 71st British Academy Film Awards
- 75th Golden Globe Awards
- 90th Academy Awards
