= David Malinowski =

David Malinowski is a BAFTA and Oscar winning special effects make-up artist. He started his career in 1996 and spent 10 years working for Madame Tussauds in London, then left to pursue his career in film and television. At the 2018 BAFTA Film Awards, he won the award for Film Makeup and Hair, and at the 90th Academy Awards, he won the award for Best Makeup and Hairstyling for his work on the 2017 film Darkest Hour. He was nominated with Kazuhiro Tsuji and Lucy Sibbick. He lives in the Buckinghamshire village of Aston Clinton.

== Early life ==
Malinowski attended New College, Stamford until 1996.

== Career ==
His first credit role was an episode of ITV show London's Burning, filmed in 1997.

== Selected filmography ==
- Wonder Woman 1984
- Bohemian Rhapsody
- Fantastic Beasts: The Crimes of Grindelwald
- Overlord
- Ready Player One
- Breathe
- Darkest Hour
- The Hitman's Bodyguard
- Fantastic Beasts and Where to Find Them
- Baar Baar Dekho
- Now You See Me 2
- Zoolander 2
- The Revenant
- Victor Frankenstein
- Dracula Untold
- The Grand Budapest Hotel
- Hansel & Gretel: Witch Hunters
- Wrath of the Titans
