= 21st Hollywood Film Awards =

US film awards ceremony in 2017

- Location: Beverly Hills, California
- Founded: 1997
- Festival date: November 6, 2017
- Website: www.hollywoodawards.com

The 21st Hollywood Film Awards were held on November 6, 2017. The ceremony took place at The Beverly Hilton Hotel in Beverly Hills, California.

== Winners ==
Hollywood Career Achievement Award
Gary Oldman
Hollywood Actor Award
Jake Gyllenhaal – Stronger
Hollywood Supporting Actor Award
Sam Rockwell – Three Billboards Outside Ebbing, Missouri
Hollywood Actress Award
Kate Winslet – Wonder Wheel
Hollywood Supporting Actress Award
Allison Janney – I, Tonya
Hollywood Comedy Award
Adam Sandler – The Meyerowitz Stories
Hollywood Breakout Actor Award
Timothée Chalamet – Call Me by Your Name
Hollywood Breakout Actress Award
Mary J. Blige – Mudbound
New Hollywood Award
Jamie Bell – Film Stars Don't Die in Liverpool
Hollywood Ensemble Award
Caitlin Carver, Paul Walter Hauser, Allison Janney, Julianne Nicholson, Margot Robbie, and Sebastian Stan – I, Tonya
Hollywood Breakout Ensemble Award
Jonathan Banks, Mary J. Blige, Jason Clarke, Garrett Hedlund, Jason Mitchell, Rob Morgan, and Carey Mulligan – Mudbound
Hollywood Comedy Ensemble Award
Holly Hunter, Zoe Kazan, Kumail Nanjiani, and Ray Romano – The Big Sick
Hollywood Animation Award
Coco
Hollywood Documentary Award
Sean Combs – Can't Stop, Won't Stop: A Bad Boy Story
Hollywood Foreign Language Film Award
Angelina Jolie and Loung Ung – First They Killed My Father
Hollywood Director Award
Joe Wright – Darkest Hour
Hollywood Producer Award
Broderick Johnson, Andrew A. Kosove, and Cynthia Sikes Yorkin – Blade Runner 2049
Hollywood Screenwriter Award
Scott Neustadter and Michael H. Weber – The Disaster Artist
Hollywood Song Award
Common, Andra Day, and Diane Warren – "Stand Up For Something" from Marshall
Hollywood Cinematography Award
Roger Deakins – Blade Runner 2049
Hollywood Film Composer Award
Thomas Newman – Victoria & Abdul
Hollywood Editor Award
Sidney Wolinsky – The Shape of Water
Hollywood Visual Effects Award
Dan Barrett, Dan Lemmon, Joe Letteri, and Erik Winquist – War for the Planet of the Apes
Hollywood Costume Design Award
Jacqueline Durran – Beauty and the Beast, Darkest Hour
Hollywood Make-Up & Hair Styling Award
Jenny Shircore – Beauty and the Beast
Hollywood Production Design Award
Dennis Gassner – Blade Runner 2049
Hollywood Sound Award
Dave Acord and Addison Teague – Guardians of the Galaxy Vol. 2
