= Douglas Urbanski =

American film producer

Douglas Urbanski is an American film producer and occasional film actor. He is an Oscar-nominated and BAFTA-winning motion picture producer.

== Life and career ==
Urbanski was born in Somerville, New Jersey and graduated from Immaculata High School where he frequently starred in the drama club.

In addition to his Academy Award winning films Darkest Hour and Mank, his other films, Tinker Tailor Soldier Spy, The Contender, and Nil By Mouth, have received 21 Academy Award nominations, 10 Golden Globe nominations, and 33 BAFTA nominations.

During the 1980s, Urbanski and/or his companies were among the most active theatrical producers on Broadway and in London.

In 1997, Urbanski received his first British Academy Award for Outstanding British Film of The Year for Nil By Mouth, written and directed by Gary Oldman, and for which Oldman received the Best Original Screenplay British Academy Award. The film received a total of four nominations for the 1997 BAFTAs. For 1997's Cannes Film Festival, Nil By Mouth was selected to inaugurate the Main Competition and received the 1997 Cannes Film Festival Award for actress Kathy Burke. In 1998 the film received six nominations for the British Independent Film Awards and won three awards.

In 2010, he was featured in David Fincher and Aaron Sorkin's film The Social Network, playing the role of Larry Summers. He shared two awards for the role with Jesse Eisenberg, Andrew Garfield, and Justin Timberlake, the Hollywood Ensemble Acting Award from the Hollywood Film Festival, and the Ensemble Acting Award from the Palm Springs International Film Festival.

Urbanski has appeared as a guest host on conservative talk shows such as The O'Reilly Factor and The Rush Limbaugh Show. During Urbanski’s May 19, 2011, appearance on The Rush Limbaugh Show, he commented, "There's a double standard of the elite Hollywood people. If something like this BP disaster had happened under the watchful eye of George Bush or even John McCain, the celebrities would be up in arms. Yet I would trust the solutions to solving this type of issue to those two men more than the others."

In 2010/11, he executive produced the film version of John le Carré's Tinker Tailor Soldier Spy, which stars Gary Oldman as master spy George Smiley and was directed by Tomas Alfredson. Tinker, Tailor, Soldier, Spy received three Oscar nominations for the 2012 Academy Awards. In 2012, Tinker became the second of his films to win the British Academy Award for Outstanding British Film of the Year.

Urbanski was executive producer of the film Criminal, released in late 2015. It was directed by Ariel Vromen and stars Kevin Costner, Gary Oldman, and Tommy Lee Jones. In 2016 Urbanski was executive producer of The Hitman's Bodyguard, as well as Hunter Killer.

Urbanski produced Darkest Hour (2017), which stars Gary Oldman as Winston Churchill. Oldman won the Oscar for Best Actor for his portrayal of Churchill and thanked Urbanski during his speech. The film received six Academy Award nominations, including Best Picture and won two: Best Actor, and Best Makeup for Kazu Tsuji, who also thanked Urbanski in his speech. For his work on the film, Urbanski received an Academy Award Nomination.

In 2018, he executive produced Steven Soderbergh's The Laundromat, which stars Gary Oldman and Meryl Streep. The 2018 Cannes Film Festival invited Urbanski and Oldman to host a public conversation, entitled "In Conversation With".

In 2019, Urbanski executive produced Nicholas Jarecki's Crisis, which stars Gary Oldman and Armie Hammer.

Also in 2019–20, he produced David Fincher's Mank, about Citizen Kane screenwriter Herman J. Mankiewicz, which stars Oldman in the title role. Mank had a limited theatrical release on November 13, 2020, and began streaming on Netflix on December 4. The film earned ten nominations at the 93rd Academy Awards, including Best Picture, Best Actor for Oldman and Best Supporting Actress for Seyfried, and won for Best Production Design and Best Cinematography. It also received six nominations at the 78th Golden Globe Awards, including Best Motion Picture – Drama. The American Film Institute awarded Mank as one of the top 10 movies of the year. Urbanski received an Academy Award nomination for Mank as producer, and was also nominated by the Producers Guild of America for The Darryl F. Zanuck Award for Outstanding Producer of Theatrical Motion Pictures.

He is an executive producer on the Apple TV+ series, Slow Horses, based upon the spy novels of Mick Herron, which also stars Gary Oldman.

=== Personal life ===
Urbanski is married to television producer Diane Wilk and they live in Beverly Hills and also in Palm Springs.
