= Lily James =

English actress (born 1989)

- James in 2026
- Born: Lily Chloe Ninette Thomson; 5 April 1989 (age 37); Esher, Surrey, England
- Education: Guildhall School of Music and Drama
- Occupation: Actress
- Years active: 2009–present
- Relatives: Helen Horton (paternal grandmother)

Lily Chloe Ninette Thomson (born 5 April 1989), known professionally as Lily James, is an English actress. She studied acting at the Guildhall School of Music and Drama in London and began her career in the British television series Just William (2010). Following a supporting role in the period drama series Downton Abbey (2012–2015), her breakthrough was the title role in the fantasy film Cinderella (2015).

James went on to portray Natasha Rostova in the television adaptation of War & Peace (2016) and starred in several films, including the action film Baby Driver (2017); the period dramas Darkest Hour (2017), The Guernsey Literary and Potato Peel Pie Society (2018) and The Dig (2021); the musicals Mamma Mia! Here We Go Again (2018) and Yesterday (2019); and the sports drama The Iron Claw (2023). Her portrayal of Pamela Anderson in the biographical series Pam & Tommy (2022) earned her nominations for a Golden Globe and a Primetime Emmy Award.

== Early life and education ==
Lily Chloe Ninette Thomson was born on 5 April 1989 in Esher, Surrey, the daughter of Ninette Mantle, an actress, and James "Jamie" Thomson, a musician. She has two brothers, one older and one younger. Her paternal grandmother, Helen Horton, was an American actress. Her maternal grandmother was French, and during World War II fled her village near Paris because of the Nazi occupation. After settling in England, she married James' grandfather, a chaplain in the Royal Air Force.

After finishing at Tring Park School for the Performing Arts in Hertfordshire, James studied at the Guildhall School of Music and Drama in London, graduating in 2010. Shortly thereafter, she signed with Tavistock Wood management in London.

== Career ==
Lily's father, James Thomson, died from cancer in 2008. She took her father's first name as her stage surname upon learning there was already an actress named Lily Thomson.

=== 2009–2019: Television beginnings and breakthrough ===
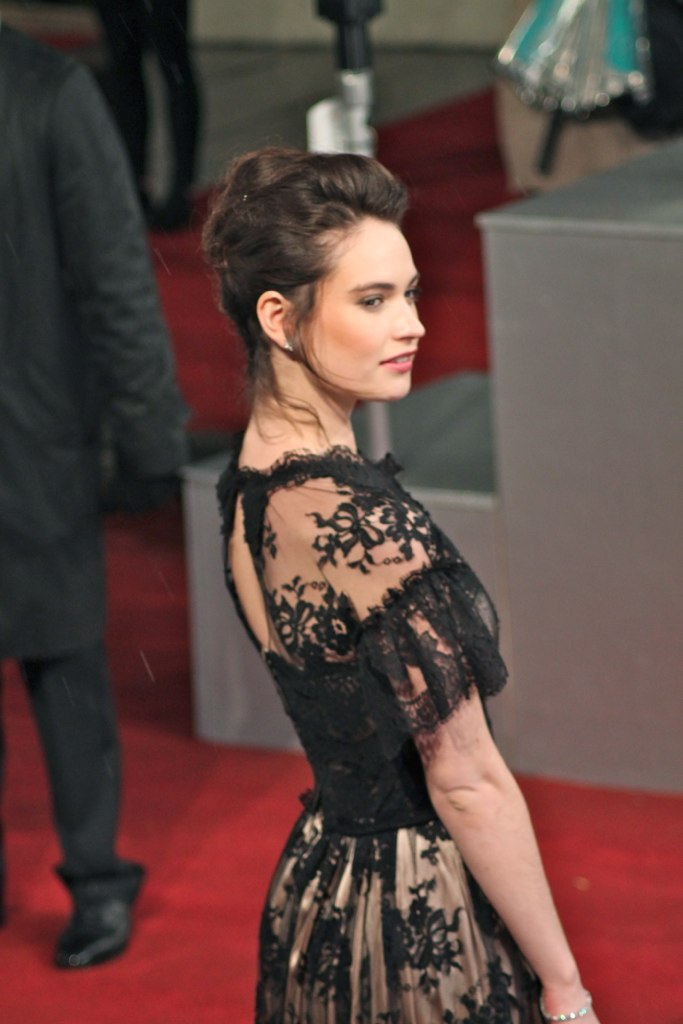
James at BAFTAs 2013

James's television credits include Ethel Brown in the 2010 BBC production of Richmal Crompton's Just William, Poppy in the fourth series of ITV's Secret Diary of a Call Girl (2011).

In 2012, she was cast as Lady Rose MacClare in Downton Abbey. She appeared as a guest star in final episode of the third season and appeared again in the Christmas special: A Journey to the Highlands. Lady Rose subsequently became a main character in the fourth and fifth series of the programme. James also appeared as Lady Rose in the series television finale. She did not reprise her role for any of the subsequent three movies.

In 2011, James played Taylor at the Young Vic Theatre in Tanya Ronder's stage adaptation of the novel Vernon God Little directed by Rufus Norris, Nina in Russell Bolam's modern adaptation of The Seagull at Southwark Playhouse, and Desdemona in Daniel Evans' production of Othello at the Crucible Theatre, Sheffield, with Dominic West and Clarke Peters.

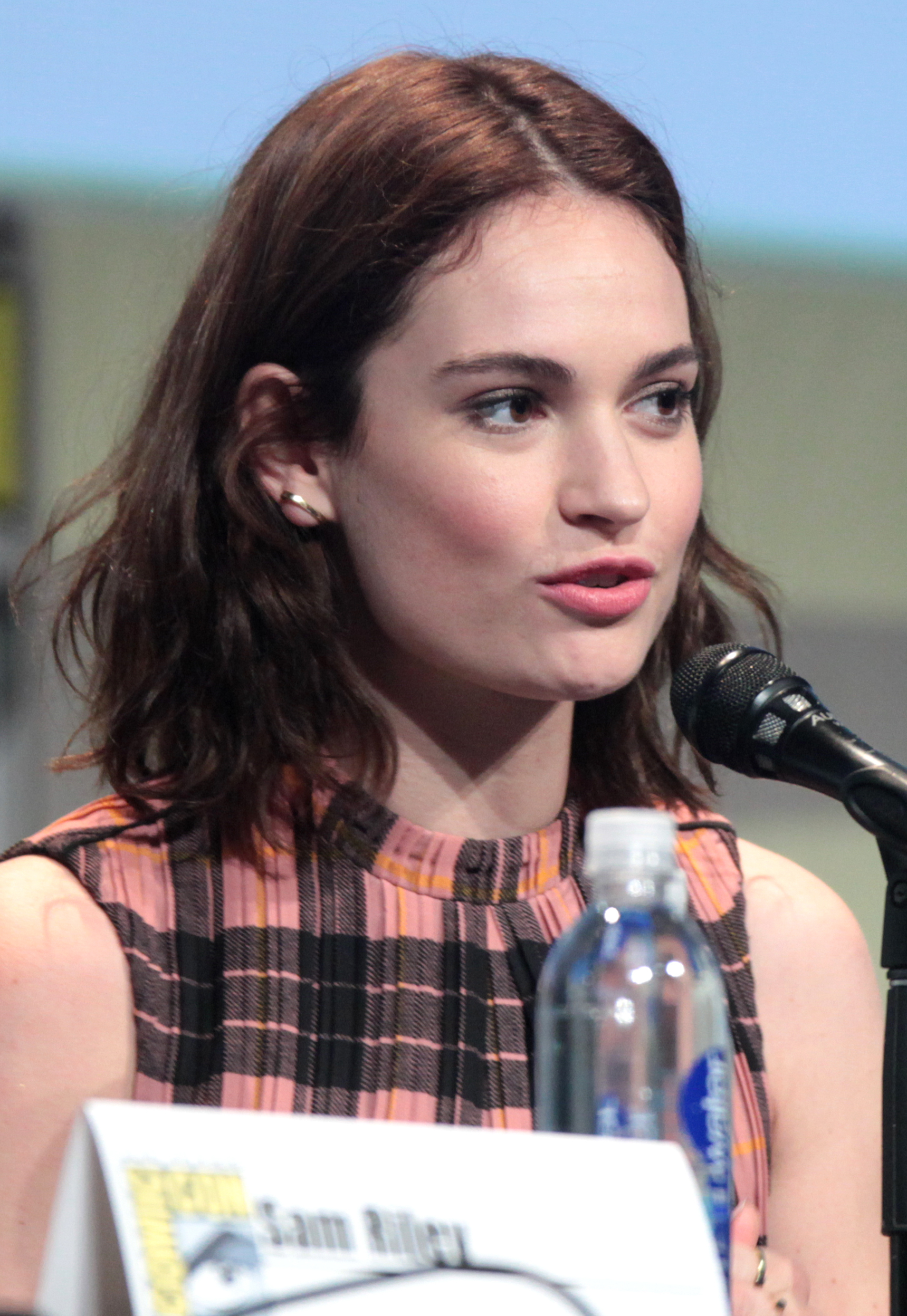
James promoting Pride and Prejudice and Zombies at the 2015 San Diego Comic-Con

In 2012, James played the role of Katrina in Play House and Marijka in Definitely the Bahamas in a double-bill written and directed by Martin Crimp at the Orange Tree Theatre in Richmond, London as part of the theatre's 40th anniversary. Charles Spencer of The Telegraph wrote that "it is performed with a persuasive mixture of mischief and deeper feeling by Obi Abili and Lily James, the latter combining a mixture of neuroticism and glowing sexual allure that proves extraordinarily potent". James played the role of Korrina in the Warner Brothers film Wrath of the Titans and starred in Fast Girls, written by Noel Clarke, centred around a group of young female athletes competing in the World Championships.

James played Cinderella in Kenneth Branagh's 2015 live-action Disney film Cinderella. James was photographed by Annie Leibovitz as Cinderella, in the blue gown her character wears to the ball, for the December 2014 issue of Vogue. Her performance received critical acclaim. James also made her singing debut in the film singing "Sing Sweet Nightingale", "Lavender's Blue" and "A Dream Is a Wish Your Heart Makes" from the 1950 animated film in the end credits.

In 2016, she returned to television in the 2016 BBC historical drama series War & Peace, playing Natasha Rostova. She also starred in her second major film, as Elizabeth Bennet in the action-horror film Pride and Prejudice and Zombies, a parody of Jane Austen's Pride and Prejudice. It received mixed reviews and failed to break even at the box office. James played Juliet in the Garrick Theatre's production of Romeo and Juliet directed by Rob Ashford and the actor-director Kenneth Branagh in 2016.

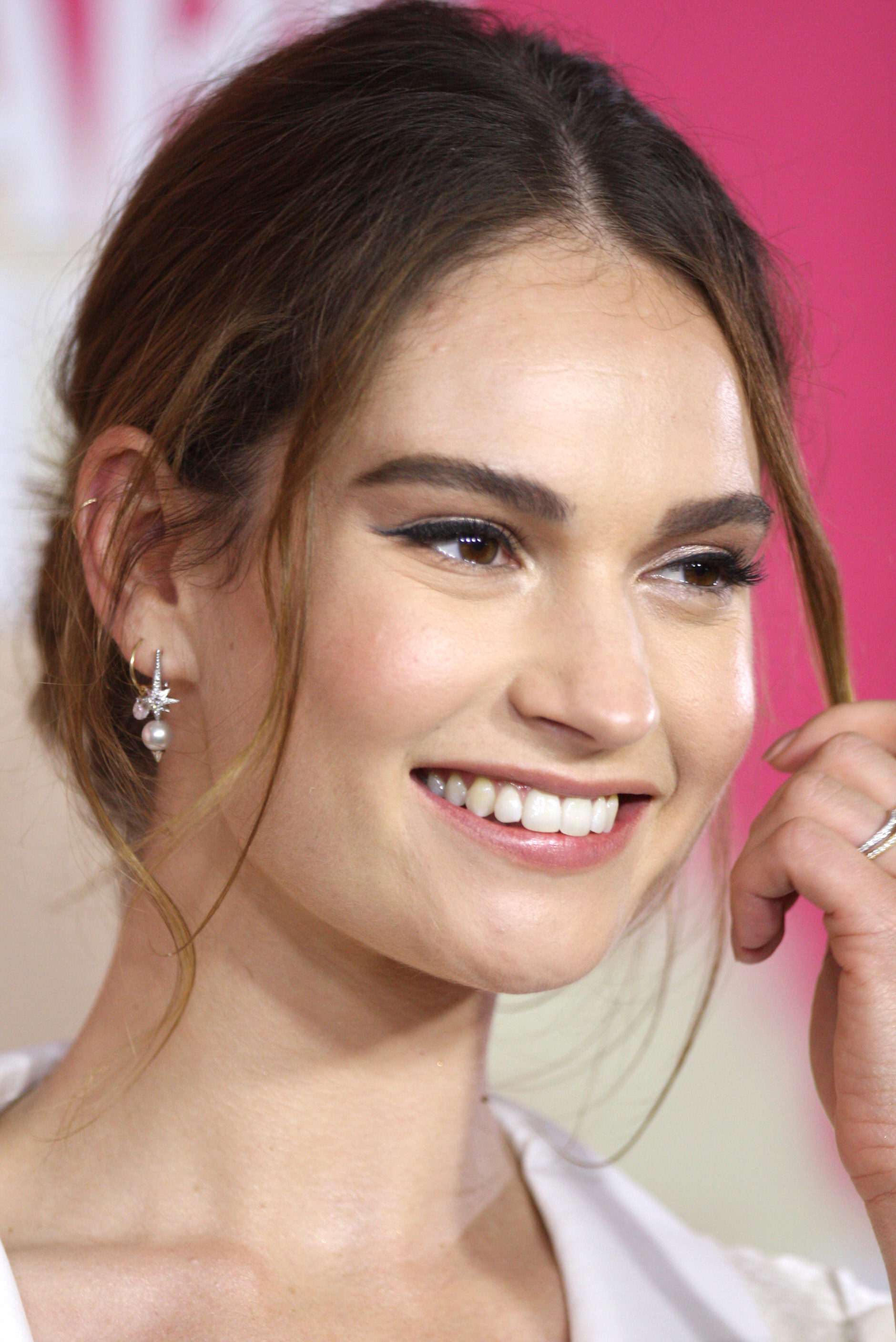
James at the Baby Driver Australian Premiere 2017

In 2017, she appeared in several major films. She played Debora, the love interest of the main character, Baby, in Edgar Wright's action film Baby Driver. She played Elizabeth Layton, a secretary to the British prime minister Winston Churchill (played by Gary Oldman), in Joe Wright's war drama film Darkest Hour. She also headlined the Second World War drama film The Exception, playing a British agent posing as a servant to the exiled Kaiser Wilhelm II.

James starred as the younger version of Meryl Streep's character, Donna Sheridan, in the sequel to Mamma Mia!, titled Mamma Mia! Here We Go Again. The film was released in July 2018. In the same year, James played the author Juliet Ashton in the 1940s period drama The Guernsey Literary and Potato Peel Pie Society who exchanges letters with the residents of Guernsey, an island off the coast of Normandy that was German-occupied during the Second World War.

In 2019, James starred as Eve Harrington in Ivo van Hove's stage adaptation of All About Eve alongside Gillian Anderson. The play opened on 15 February to positive reviews, running at the Noël Coward Theatre in the West End until 11 May.

=== 2020–present: Rise in popularity and film roles ===
In 2020, James played the second Mrs de Winter in an adaptation of Daphne du Maurier's Gothic romance Rebecca directed by Ben Wheatley and co-starring Armie Hammer. In Spring 2020, she was cast as leading lady in The Pursuit of Love, released in 2021. In 2021, she played Peggy Piggott in The Dig, a British film directed by Simon Stone, based on the 2007 novel of the same name by John Preston. In late 2020, she was cast to play Pamela Anderson in the miniseries Pam & Tommy for Hulu.

In September 2022, it was announced that James was contracted to be a brand ambassador for the Natural Diamond Council, which promotes naturally sourced diamonds.

Gala Gordon and Lily James at TIFF 2025

In June 2023, it was announced that James would star in Penelope Skinner’s new play Lyonesse at the Harold Pinter Theatre, alongside Kristin Scott Thomas, whom she previously acted with in Darkest Hour and Rebecca. It will run from 17 October to 23 December. In 2023, she starred as Pam Adkisson, Kevin Von Erich's wife, in The Iron Claw. She also starred in the Italian film Finally Dawn as Josephine Esperanto. James starred in the indie film Greedy People along with Himesh Patel and Joseph Gordon-Levitt which released in 2024.

James is set to star as the lead in the upcoming Cliffhanger reboot directed by Jaume Collet-Serra. Originally Sylvester Stallone was set to play the lead, but production announced he was no longer involved with the film.

== Personal life ==
James was in a relationship with actor Matt Smith, whom she met while working on Pride and Prejudice and Zombies, from 2014 to 2019.

In 2021, James began dating Queens of the Stone Age bass guitarist Michael Shuman. Their relationship ended in 2023.

== Acting credits ==
Key
†	Denotes productions that have not yet been released

=== Film ===
Year	Title	Role	Notes
2012	Chemistry	Ines	Short film
2012	Wrath of the Titans	Korrina	
2012	Broken	Older Skunk	
2012	Fast Girls	Lisa Temple	
2013	The Silent Treatment	The Girl	Short film
2015	Cinderella	Ella / Cinderella	
2015	Burnt	Sara	
2016	Pride and Prejudice and Zombies	Elizabeth "Eliza / Lizzy" Bennet	
2016	The Exception	Mieke de Jong	
2016	The Tale of Thomas Burberry	Betty	Short film
2017	Baby Driver	Debora	
2017	Darkest Hour	Elizabeth Layton	
2018	Sorry to Bother You	White Detroit (voice)	Cameo
2018	The Guernsey Literary and Potato Peel Pie Society	Juliet Ashton	
2018	Little Woods	Deb Hale	
2018	Mamma Mia! Here We Go Again	Young Donna Sheridan	
2019	One Red Nose Day and a Wedding	Miranda	Short film
2019	Yesterday	Ellie Appleton	
2019	Rare Beasts	Cressida	
2020	Rebecca	Mrs. de Winter	
2021	The Dig	Peggy Piggott	
2022	What's Love Got to Do with It?	Zoe Stevenson	
2023	Finally Dawn	Josephine Esperanto	
2023	The Iron Claw	Pam Adkisson	
2024	Greedy People	Paige Shelley	
2024	Relay	Sarah Grant	
2025	Swiped	Whitney Wolfe Herd	Also producer
2026	The Liberation	Ricki King	
2026	Bad Lieutenant: Tokyo	TBA	
2026	The Angry Birds Movie 3 †	TBA (voice)	Completed
2027	Cliffhanger †	Naomi Cooper	Completed; Also producer
2027	Seasons †	Sasha Blakemore	Filming
2027	Subversion †	TBA	Post-production

=== Television ===
Year	Title	Role	Notes
2010	Just William	Ethel Brown	4 episodes
2011	Secret Diary of a Call Girl	Poppy	8 episodes
2012–2015	Downton Abbey	Lady Rose Aldridge (née MacClare)	21 episodes
2016	War & Peace	Natasha Rostova	6 episodes
2021	The Pursuit of Love	Linda Radlett	3 episodes; also executive producer
2021	Beauty and the Beast	Rose	Television pantomime
2022	Pam & Tommy	Pamela Anderson	Miniseries

=== Theatre ===
Year	Title	Role	Venue
2011	Vernon God Little	Taylor	Young Vic
2011	Othello	Desdemona	Crucible Theatre
2012	The Seagull	Nina	Southwark Playhouse
2016	Romeo and Juliet	Juliet	Garrick Theatre
2019	All About Eve	Eve Harrington	Noël Coward Theatre
2023	Lyonesse	Kate	Harold Pinter Theatre

== Awards and nominations ==
Accolades received by Lily James
Award	Year	Category	Recipient(s)	Result
Screen Actors Guild Awards	2014	Outstanding Performance by an Ensemble in a Drama Series	Downton Abbey	Won
Teen Choice Awards	2015	Choice Movie Actress: Sci-Fi/Fantasy	Cinderella	Nominated
Screen Actors Guild Awards	2015	Outstanding Performance by an Ensemble in a Drama Series	Downton Abbey	Won
Kids' Choice Awards	2016	Favorite Movie Actress	Cinderella	Nominated
People's Choice Awards	2018	Female Movie Star	Mamma Mia! Here We Go Again	Nominated
Dorian Television Awards	2022	Best TV Performance	Pam & Tommy	Nominated
Hollywood Critics Association TV Awards	2022	Best Actress in a Streaming Limited or Anthology Series or Movie	Pam & Tommy	Nominated
Primetime Emmy Awards	2022	Outstanding Lead Actress in a Limited or Anthology Series or Movie	Pam & Tommy	Nominated
Critics' Choice Television Awards	2023	Best Actress in a Limited Series or Movie Made for Television	Pam & Tommy	Nominated
Golden Globe Awards	2023	Best Actress – Limited or Anthology Series or Television Film	Pam & Tommy	Nominated
Satellite Awards	2023	Best Actress in a Miniseries, Limited Series, or Motion Picture Made for Television	Pam & Tommy	Won

== See also ==
- List of British actors
