= Lisa Bruce =

American film producer

- Born: Monterey, California, U.S.
- Education: University of California, Santa Barbara (BA); New York University (MFA)
- Occupation: Film producer
- Years active: 1992–present

Lisa Bruce is an American film producer known for the 2014 film The Theory of Everything.

== Early life and education ==
Bruce was born in Monterey, California, to Mary Ann and George W. Bruce. She is one of five children. When she was in middle school, her family moved from Monterey to Coronado, California, because of her father's job with the United States Navy as a commanding officer of the USS Ticonderoga and USS St. Louis. As a teenager, Bruce worked at a local movie theater, where her brother paid her a dollar per hour to mop the floor; she has joked that it was her "first job in the movie business".

Bruce attended Coronado High School, where she began creating short films and was elected senior class president. She attended the University of California, Santa Barbara and graduated in 1983 with an undergraduate degree in film, sociology, and politics. She later attended New York University's graduate film school where she received a master's degree.

== Career ==
Bruce began working as a film producer in 1992, when she and Robert Nickson—Bruce's NYU professor and mentor—founded the production company Orenda Films and produced Pen Pals. Orenda Films later produced The Search for One-eye Jimmy (1994), Bye Bye America (1994), and No Way Home (1996). In 1999, Bruce co-produced the independent film Tumbleweeds, which won numerous awards and accolades. She went on to executive-produce The Emperor's Club (2002), A Lot like Love (2005), Fighting (2009), Case 39 (2009), and Arthur Newman (2012). Working with HBO, she also produced the telefilms Walkout (2006), about the East L.A. walkouts in 1968, and Mary and Martha (2013), about two female malaria activists.

Bruce was a producer of The Theory of Everything, a film about physicist Stephen Hawking's first marriage to Jane Wilde Hawking that was released in 2015. Bruce first became involved with the project in 2009 when she joined New Zealand filmmaker Anthony McCarten, who had first begun his attempts to produce the film in 2004. The Theory of Everything was widely praised and received nominations for four Academy Awards, four Golden Globe Awards, and ten British Academy Film Awards.
