= Darkest Hour (film) =

2017 biographical war drama film by Joe Wright

- Theatrical release poster
- Directed by: Joe Wright
- Written by: Anthony McCarten
- Produced by: Tim Bevan; Lisa Bruce; Eric Fellner; Anthony McCarten; Douglas Urbanski
- Starring: Gary Oldman; Kristin Scott Thomas; Lily James; Stephen Dillane; Ronald Pickup; Ben Mendelsohn
- Cinematography: Bruno Delbonnel
- Edited by: Valerio Bonelli
- Music by: Dario Marianelli
- Production companies: Perfect World Pictures; Working Title Films
- Distributed by: Focus Features (United States); Universal Pictures (International)
- Release dates: 1 September 2017 (Telluride); 22 December 2017 (United States); 12 January 2018 (United Kingdom)
- Running time: 125 minutes
- Country: United Kingdom
- Language: English
- Budget: $30 million
- Box office: $150.8 million

Darkest Hour is a 2017 British biographical war drama film directed by Joe Wright and written by Anthony McCarten. It stars Gary Oldman as Winston Churchill, in his early days as Prime Minister of the United Kingdom during the Second World War and the May 1940 war cabinet crisis. The cast also includes Kristin Scott Thomas as Clementine Churchill, Lily James as Elizabeth Layton, Stephen Dillane as Viscount Halifax, Ronald Pickup as Neville Chamberlain, and Ben Mendelsohn as King George VI. The title of the film refers to a description of the early days of the war, widely attributed to Churchill.

Darkest Hour had its world premiere at the 44th Telluride Film Festival on 1 September 2017. It began a limited release in the US on 22 November 2017, followed by a wide release on 22 December, and was released on 12 January 2018 in the UK. The film grossed $150 million worldwide and received positive reviews from critics, who deemed Oldman's performance one of the best of his career. Darkest Hour received several accolades, including Best Actor for Oldman at the Academy Awards, the BAFTAs, the Golden Globes, and the SAG Awards.

== Plot ==
In May 1940, the opposition Labour Party in Parliament demands the resignation of British prime minister Neville Chamberlain for being too weak in the face of the Nazi onslaught. Conservative Party colleagues want Lord Halifax as his successor, but Halifax does not feel it is his time. Chamberlain chooses the only man whom the opposition will accept as leader of a national government: Winston Churchill, who had correctly predicted the danger from Adolf Hitler before the war but has a poor reputation in Parliament.

As Germany invades the Low Countries, Churchill is brusque with his new secretary Elizabeth Layton for mishearing him, which earns him a rebuke from his wife Clementine. King George VI, who is sceptical of Churchill due to his actions during the abdication crisis, reluctantly invites him to form a government. Churchill includes Chamberlain as Lord President of the Council and Halifax as Foreign Secretary.

Parliament reacts coolly to Churchill's first speech promising "Blood, toil, tears and sweat". Chamberlain and Halifax are appalled by Churchill's refusal to negotiate for peace, and plan to resign from the government to force a vote of no confidence and create a situation in which Halifax would likely become prime minister. Churchill visits French prime minister Paul Reynaud, who thinks that Churchill is delusional for not admitting that the Allies are losing the Battle of France, while Churchill is furious that the French do not have a plan to counterattack. Although US president Franklin Roosevelt is sympathetic to Churchill's plight, his actions are limited by an isolationist Congress and the Neutrality Acts.

Churchill draws ire from his cabinet and advisers for delivering a radio address in which he falsely implies the Allies are advancing in France, earning him a rebuke from the king. Halifax and Chamberlain continue to push to use Italian Ambassador Giuseppe Bastianini as an intermediary with Germany.

The British Expeditionary Force is trapped at Dunkirk and Calais, and Britain begins preparing for a German invasion. Against the advice of the War Cabinet, Churchill orders Brigadier Nicholson in Calais to lead the 30th Infantry Brigade to distract the enemy and buy time for the evacuation of soldiers from Dunkirk. The debacle in France causes the War Cabinet to support negotiating with Germany. Under heavy pressure, Churchill agrees to consider a negotiated peace but chokes on the words as he tries to dictate a letter requesting talks.

George VI unexpectedly visits Churchill, explaining that he has come to support Churchill to continue the war. Churchill's idea to have civilian boats evacuate troops from Dunkirk (Operation Dynamo) is initiated. Still uncertain, Churchill impulsively rides the London Underground (for the first time in his life) and asks startled passengers for their opinions: they all want to continue to fight. Churchill addresses the Outer Cabinet and other members of Parliament and finds that they, too, have little desire to surrender.

As Churchill prepares to address Parliament, Halifax asks Chamberlain to continue with their plan to resign, but Chamberlain decides to first listen to the address. Finishing his speech, Churchill proclaims "we shall fight on the beaches", should the Germans invade, to resounding support from the opposition, while the Conservative MPs behind him sit in silence until Chamberlain mops his brow with his handkerchief; a prearranged signal that they should support the PM. Churchill exits to cheers and enthusiastic waving of Order Papers.

An epilogue reveals that almost all of the soldiers trapped at Dunkirk were successfully evacuated; Chamberlain died six months later; Halifax was reassigned to a posting in Washington, D.C., and Churchill was voted out of office after the end of World War II in Europe.

== Cast ==
- Gary Oldman as Winston Churchill
- Kristin Scott Thomas as Clementine Churchill
- Ben Mendelsohn as King George VI
- Lily James as Elizabeth Layton
- Ronald Pickup as Neville Chamberlain
- Stephen Dillane as Viscount Halifax
- Nicholas Jones as Sir John Simon
- Samuel West as Anthony Eden
- David Schofield as Clement Attlee
- Richard Lumsden as General Ismay
- Malcolm Storry as General Ironside
- Hilton McRae as Arthur Greenwood
- Benjamin Whitrow as Sir Samuel Hoare
- Joe Armstrong as John Evans
- Adrian Rawlins as Air Chief Marshal Dowding
- David Bamber as Admiral Ramsay
- Paul Leonard as Admiral Dudley Pound
- Demetri Goritsas as Cabinet Secretary Bridges
- Olivier Broche as Paul Reynaud
- Brian Pettifer as Kingsley Wood
- Jeremy Child as Lord Stanhope
- Richard Glover as Claude Nicholson

David Strathairn provides the voice of US president Franklin D. Roosevelt, heard on a telephone call with Churchill.

This was the final film role for Whitrow, who died after its September premiere.

== Production ==
=== Development and casting ===
On 5 February 2015, it was announced that Working Title Films had acquired Darkest Hour, a speculative screenplay by The Theory of Everything screenwriter Anthony McCarten, about Winston Churchill in the early days of the Second World War.

On 29 March 2016, it was reported that Joe Wright was in talks to direct the film. In April 2016, Gary Oldman was reported to be in talks to play Churchill. On 6 September 2016, it was announced that Focus Features would release the film in the United States on 24 November 2017, while Ben Mendelsohn was set to play King George VI and Kristin Scott Thomas was cast as Clementine Churchill. On 8 November 2016, Stephen Dillane joined the cast. John Hurt was initially cast as Neville Chamberlain, but dropped the role in pre-production as he was undergoing treatment for pancreatic cancer; Hurt died in January 2017. Ronald Pickup assumed the role of Chamberlain instead.

=== Filming ===
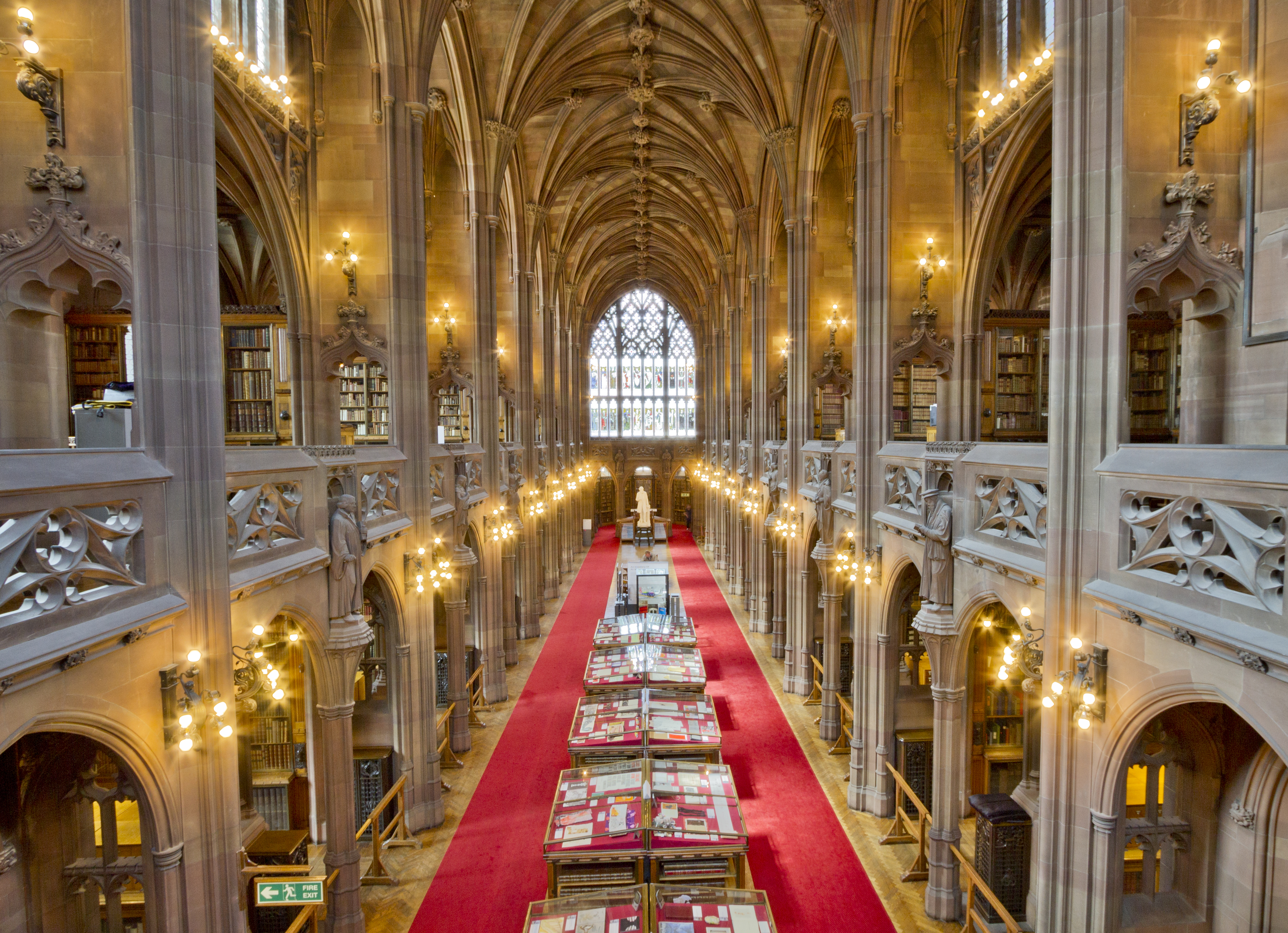
Filming took place at the John Rylands Library in Manchester, as well as at Manchester Town Hall, to portray the Houses of Parliament.

By November 2016, Darkest Hour had begun principal photography, and it was reported that Dario Marianelli would score the film. For his role as Churchill, Oldman spent over 200 hours having make-up applied, and smoked over 400 cigars (worth about $20,000) during filming. Filming took place in Manchester, England, at both the Town Hall and John Rylands Library, both doubling for the Houses of Parliament and featuring heavily in the film.

For locations, the exterior of Chartwell House near Westerham, Kent (Churchill's actual country home), was used for the sequence that sees Churchill's secretary Elizabeth Layton receive a telegram from Buckingham Palace. Fort Amherst in Kent featured as the location for both Admiral Ramsay's operational HQ and the Calais garrison. For the interior of Buckingham Palace, Wentworth Woodhouse in Wentworth, South Yorkshire, was used.

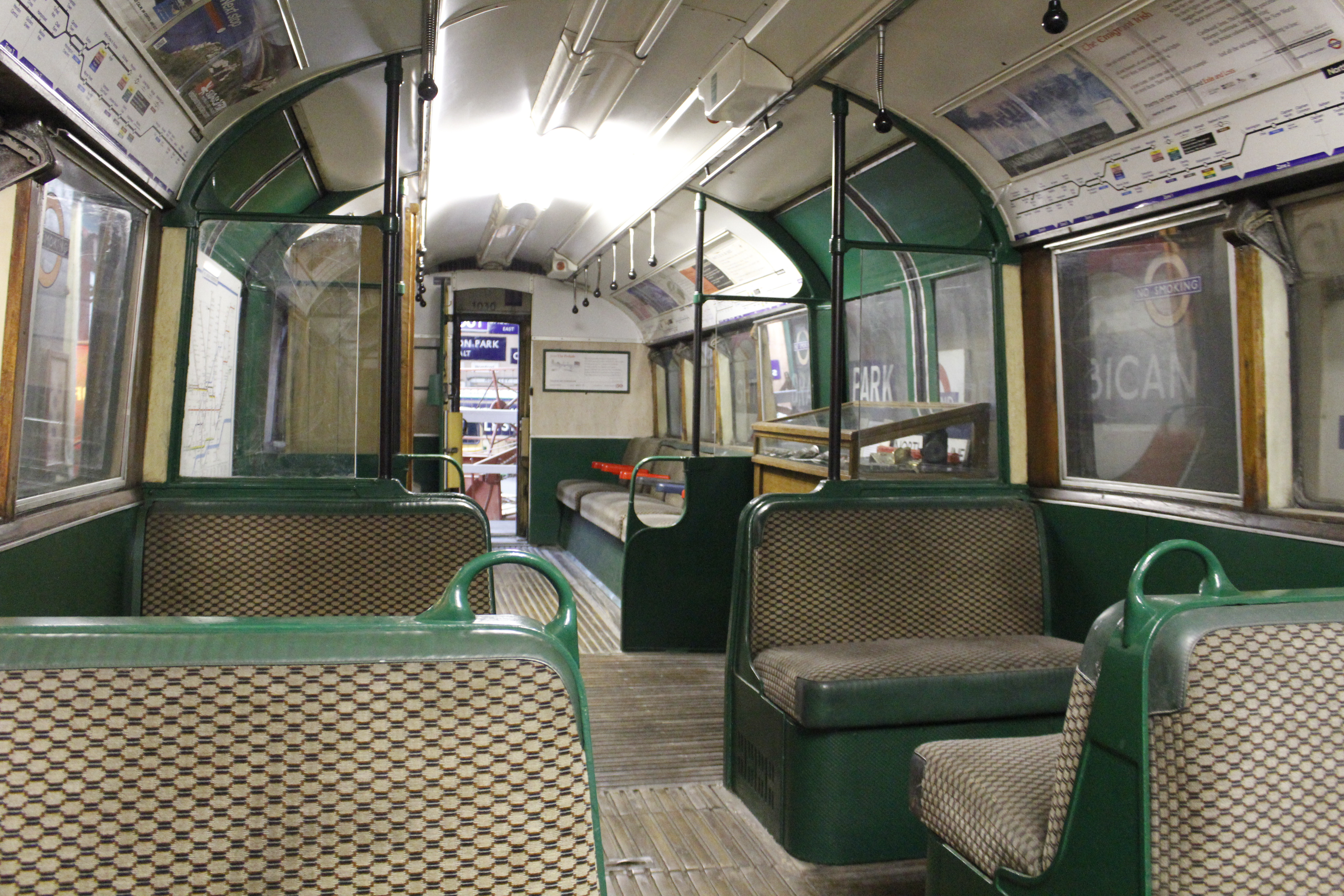
Interior of 1959 Driving Motor No.1030, as used in the film.

Filming also took place at Warner Bros Leavesden Studios in Hertfordshire for the scene where Churchill gets onto the London Underground, with a 1959 stock train hired from Mangapps Railway Museum in Essex.

== Reception ==
=== Box office ===
Darkest Hour grossed $56.5 million in the United States and Canada, and $93.8 million in other countries (including $33.4 million in the UK), for a worldwide total of $150.2 million.

In the United States and Canada, the film began a limited release on 22 November 2017. In its first five days, it grossed $246,761 from four cinemas (an average of $61,690), finishing 21st at the box office over the weekend. The film had its wide release on 22 December 2017, alongside Downsizing, Pitch Perfect 3, and Father Figures, and the wide release of The Shape of Water, and grossed $3.9 million from 804 cinemas over that weekend, and $5.5 million over the four-day Christmas period. 85% of its audience was over the age of 25, with 30% being 50 or older. The following weekend, the film made $5.5 million, and a total of $7 million over the four-day New Years period. Over the weekend of 27 January 2018, following the announcement of the film's six Oscar nominations, it made $2.1 million.

=== Critical response ===
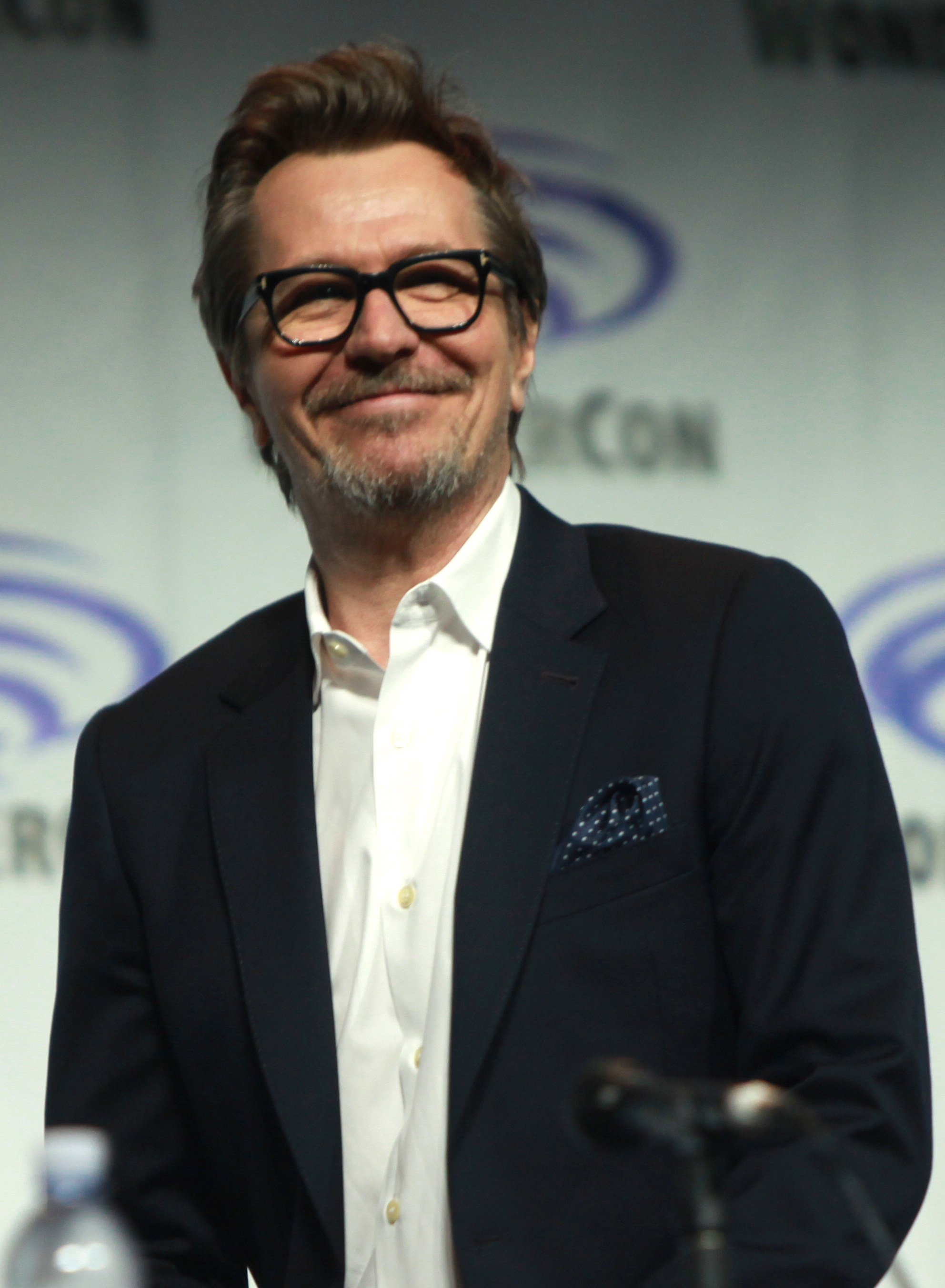
Oldman's performance as Winston Churchill earned him his first Academy Award for Best Actor.

On review aggregator website Rotten Tomatoes, the film holds an approval rating of 84% based on 317 reviews, with an average score of 7.3/10; the site's "critics consensus" reads: "Darkest Hour is held together by Gary Oldman's electrifying performance, which brings Winston Churchill to life even when the movie's narrative falters." On Metacritic, which assigns a weighted average rating to reviews, the film has a score of 75 out of 100, based on 50 critics. PostTrak reported that over 90% of audience members gave a rating of either "excellent" or "very good".

Oldman was praised for his performance, with numerous critics labelling him a frontrunner to win the Academy Award for Best Actor, which he went on to win. Peter Travers of Rolling Stone wrote: "Get busy engraving Oldman's name on an Oscar... those fearing that Darkest Hour is nothing but a dull tableau of blowhard stuffed shirts will be relieved to know that they're in for a lively, provocative historical drama that runs on its own nonstop creative fire". David Ehrlich of IndieWire praised Wright's direction and the musical score, writing: "Unfolding with the clockwork precision of a Broadway play... it's a deliciously unsubtle testament to the power of words and their infinite capacity to inspire". Damon Wise of the Radio Times described the film as a "near-perfect companion piece" to Dunkirk, concluding: "Wright's forceful direction depicts not so much a hero as a principled man snatching victory from the jaws of defeat. Certain engineered Hollywood moments dilute the overall impact, including a twee meet and greet on a Tube train, but Oldman is never less than sensational."

Brian Tallerico of RogerEbert.com called the film "an acting exercise weighed down by costumes, make-up, and over-lighting", adding that "there's nothing new to the approach. It feels often like an obligation – a story that someone felt should be told again and a way to get a great actor his Oscar". Writing for GQ, Stuart McGurk described it as "a bad film. It's not terrible, it's just, well, not good. It's the kind of film you'd watch on Netflix if it was raining, or on an iPad if it was the only film on the iPad, or on TV if you'd lost the remote. There are many reasons for this, but the main one is director Joe Wright, who never met a script he didn't dumb-down." McGurk continued: "Gary Oldman winning for Best Actor is well deserved [...] genuinely unrecognizable, his Churchill somehow both less growly but more grave. In short, he plays the character not the caricature."

== Home media ==
Darkest Hour was released on digital streaming platforms on 6 February 2018, and on Blu-ray, DVD, and 4K UHD Blu-ray on 12 June 2018.

== Historical accuracy ==
Writing in Slate, historian and academic John Broich called Darkest Hour "a piece of historical fiction that undertakes a serious historical task", presenting the British decision to fight Hitler as a choice rather than an inevitability. The situation in 1940 was as dire as depicted, but liberties were taken with the facts. The shouting matches over possible peace negotiations are a dramatic exaggeration of the 1940 British war cabinet crisis. According to historian Ashley Jackson, Darkest Hour's depiction of Churchill having personal doubts, and even considering negotiating a settlement with Nazi Germany, is not true to the historical Churchill, who Jackson argues had "supreme confidence". Churchill's journey on the London Underground is also entirely fictional, and there is evidence that many British people were not immediately inspired by his speeches.

There is no conclusive evidence that Chamberlain and Viscount Halifax were planning an imminent vote of no confidence, although that threat existed until the victories in North Africa. It is a fact that Churchill was an object of suspicion for his fellow Tories. The Labour Party confirmed that they would serve in a national government under a leader other than Chamberlain, and would have been prepared to serve under Halifax.

Adam Gopnik wrote for The New Yorker that Darkest Hour under-dramatises the role of Labour Party leader Clement Attlee; historically, "it was the steadfast anti-Nazism of Attlee and his Labour colleagues that saved the day" when Halifax argued for a settlement, but Darkest Hour failed to accurately portray this and was a "Churchill-centric" film. This criticism was echoed by Adrian Smith, emeritus professor of modern history at the University of Southampton, who wrote in the New Statesman that the film was "yet again overlooking Labour's key role at the most dangerous moment in this country's history ... in May 1940 its leaders gave Churchill the unequivocal support he needed when refusing to surrender. Ignoring Attlee's vital role is just one more failing in a deeply flawed film".

Referring to Charles Moore's comment that the film was "superb Brexit propaganda", Afua Hirsch wrote in The Guardian: "I would call the film propaganda, more generally – and a great example of the kind of myth we like to promote in modern Britain. Churchill has been re-branded as a tube-travelling, minority-adoring genius, in line with a general understanding of him as 'the greatest Briton of all time'." Hirsch also criticised "the idea that Winston Churchill stood alone at the Darkest Hour, as Nazi fascism encroached, with Britain a small and vulnerable nation isolated in the north Atlantic. In reality, the United Kingdom was at that moment an imperial power with the collective might of Indian, African, Canadian and Australian manpower, resources and wealth at its disposal."

The film implies that both Clementine Churchill and the King listened to Churchill's 'beaches' speech on the radio as Churchill delivered it. In reality, radio broadcasts from Parliament did not start until the 1970s. Churchill recorded the speech for posterity in 1949. Nor did he, unlike for other speeches, repeat it on the radio shortly afterwards. The 'beaches' speech was first delivered on 4 June 1940 – after the Dunkirk evacuation – not on 28 May 1940, as suggested by the film.

Elizabeth Layton did not become Churchill's secretary until a year after the events of the film. She also tells Churchill that her brother was killed during the retreat to Dunkirk, which is a fictional detail.

== Possible sequel ==
Oldman stated in February 2018 that there was talk of making a sequel to Darkest Hour, which might include Franklin D. Roosevelt, set during the 1945 Yalta Conference.
