= Kristi Yamaguchi =

American figure skater (born 1971)

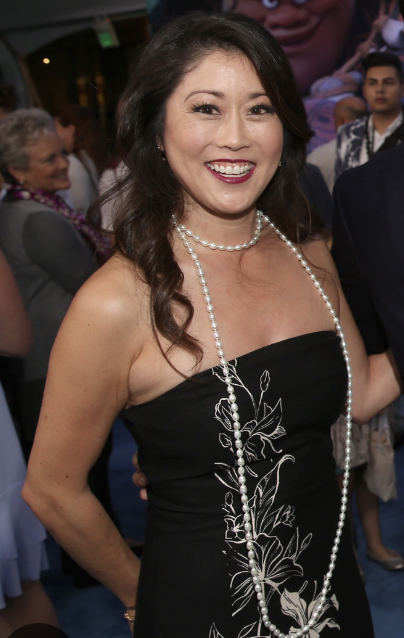
- Yamaguchi in 2016
- Born: July 12, 1971 (age 55); Fremont, California, U.S.
- Occupations: Figure skater; author; philanthropist
- Organizations: Always Dream
- Notable work: Dream Big, Little Pig!
- Children: 2
- Figure skating career
- Height: 5 ft 2 in (157 cm)
- Skating club: St. Moritz ISC
- Retired: 1992
Medal record
Representing the United States
Ladies' figure skating
Olympic Games
Gold medal – first place	1992 Albertville	Ladies' singles
World Championships
Gold medal – first place	1991 Munich	Ladies' singles
Gold medal – first place	1992 Oakland	Ladies' singles
World Junior Championships
Gold medal – first place	1988 Brisbane	Ladies' singles
Pairs' figure skating
World Junior Championships
Gold medal – first place	1988 Brisbane	Pairs
Bronze medal – third place	1987 Kitchener	Pairs

Kristine Tsuya Yamaguchi (born July 12, 1971) is an American former competitive figure skater, author and philanthropist. A former competitor in women's singles, Yamaguchi is the 1992 Olympic champion, a two-time World champion (1991 and 1992), and the 1992 U.S. champion. In 1992, she became the first Asian American to win a gold medal in a Winter Olympic competition. As a pairs skater with Rudy Galindo, she is the 1988 World Junior champion and a two-time national champion (1989 and 1990).

After Yamaguchi retired from competition in 1992, she performed in shows and participated in the professional competition circuit. She won the World Professional Figure Skating Championships four times in her career (1992, 1994, 1996 and 1997). In 2005, Yamaguchi was inducted into the U.S. Olympic Hall of Fame, and in 2008, she became the celebrity champion in the sixth season of Dancing with the Stars.

Yamaguchi is an author and has published five books. Dream Big, Little Pig!, for which she received the Gelett Burgess Children's Book Award, appeared on The New York Times Best Seller list.

== Early life ==
Yamaguchi was born on July 12, 1971, in Hayward, California, to Jim Yamaguchi, a dentist, and Carole (née Doi), a medical secretary. Yamaguchi is Sansei (a third-generation descendant of Japanese emigrants). Her paternal grandparents and maternal great-grandparents emigrated to the United States from Japan, originating from Wakayama Prefecture and Saga Prefecture. Yamaguchi's grandparents were sent to an internment camp during World War II, where her mother was born. Her maternal grandfather, George A. Doi, was in the U.S. Army and fought in Germany and France during World War II during the time his family was interned at the Heart Mountain and Amache camps. Research done in 2010 by Harvard Professor Henry Louis Gates Jr. for the PBS series Faces of America showed that Yamaguchi's heritage can be traced back to Wakayama and Saga prefectures in Japan and that her paternal grandfather, Tatsuichi Yamaguchi, emigrated to Hawaii in 1899.

Yamaguchi and her siblings, Brett and Lori, grew up in Fremont, California. To accommodate her training schedule, Yamaguchi was home-schooled for her first two years of high school, but attended Mission San Jose High School for her junior and senior years, where she graduated.

== Competitive skating career ==
=== Early career ===
Yamaguchi was born with bi-lateral clubfoot, resulting in treatment with the Ponseti method during her early years: she wore a series of leg casting for most of the first year of her life, followed by corrective shoes and bracing. She became interested in ice skating at age 4 or 5 after seeing Peggy Fleming and Dorothy Hamill in the Ice Follies and Ice Capades, and doctors encouraged skating as a form of physical therapy.

From sixth grade on, Yamaguchi practiced from 5 a.m. to 10 a.m. before school and sometimes after school. Her mother would drive her to the rink every morning at 4 a.m. and wait for her to finish. She would also accompany Yamaguchi to several competitions a month.

=== Pairs career ===
In 1986 Yamaguchi won the junior title at the U.S. championships with Rudy Galindo. Two years later, Yamaguchi won the singles and, with Galindo, the pairs titles at the 1988 World Junior Championships; Galindo had won the 1987 World Junior Championship in singles. In 1989 Yamaguchi and Galindo won the senior pairs title at the U.S. Championships. They won the title again in 1990.

As a pairs team Yamaguchi and Galindo were unusual in that they were both accomplished singles skaters, which allowed them to consistently perform difficult elements like side by side triple flip jumps, which even twenty years later would still be considered a very difficult pair element. They also jumped and spun in opposite directions, Yamaguchi counter-clockwise, and Galindo clockwise, which gave them an unusual look on the ice. In 1990, Yamaguchi decided to focus solely on singles. Galindo went on to have a successful singles career as well, winning the 1996 U.S. championships and the 1996 World bronze medal.

=== Singles career ===
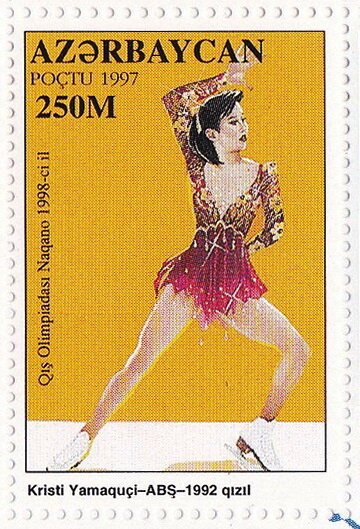
Yamaguchi on an Azerbaijani postage stamp

==== 1989–90 season: Goodwill Games gold ====
Yamaguchi won her first major international gold medal in figure skating at the 1990 Goodwill Games.

=== 1990–91 season: First world title ===
In 1991 Yamaguchi moved to Edmonton, Alberta, to train with coach Christy Ness. There, she took psychology courses at the University of Alberta. The same year, Yamaguchi placed second to Tonya Harding at the U.S. championships, her third consecutive silver medal at Nationals, with a free skate that included a fall on a triple Salchow but also six clean triple jumps. The following month in Munich, Germany, Yamaguchi won the 1991 World Championships. That year, the American ladies team, consisting of Yamaguchi, Harding and Nancy Kerrigan, became the only national ladies team to have its members sweep the Worlds podium until the 2021 World Figure Skating Championships, when Anna Shcherbakova, Elizaveta Tuktamysheva and Alexandra Trusova swept the podium representing FSR.

=== 1991–92 season: Olympic gold and second world title ===
In 1992 Yamaguchi won her first U.S. title and gained a spot to the 1992 Winter Olympics in Albertville, France. Joining her on the U.S. team were again Kerrigan and Harding. While Harding and Japan's Midori Ito were consistently landing the difficult triple Axel jump in competition, Yamaguchi instead focused on her artistry and her triple-triple combinations in hopes of becoming a more well-rounded skater. Both Harding and Ito fell on their triple Axels at the Olympics (though Ito successfully landed the jump later on in her long program after missing the first time), allowing Yamaguchi to win the gold, despite errors in her free program, including putting a hand to the ice on a triple loop and a double salchow instead of a planned triple. She later explained her mindset during the long program: "You just do your best and forget the rest." Yamaguchi went on to successfully defend her World title that same year.

== Professional skating career ==
Yamaguchi planned to start the 1992–93 competitive season at Prague Skate in Czechoslovakia in November but U.S Figure Skating insisted that all its skaters compete at Skate America, which was due to take place a month earlier in October. Skate America became a source of contention between the federation and Yamaguchi, who was unable to be ready in time due to a busy schedule with commercial appearances and speaking engagements following her wins at the 1992 Winter Olympics and 1992 World Championships. As a result, Yamaguchi decided to turn professional after the 1991–92 competitive season and immediately started competing on the pro competition circuit, starting with the World Professional Figure Skating Championships in December 1992 where she captured her first world pro gold. By the time she stopped competing as a professional, she had become a four-time professional world champion (1992, 1994, 1996 and 1997). She finished second in 1993 behind Midori Ito and in 1995 behind Yuka Sato.

She toured extensively with Stars on Ice for over a decade. Originally, Stars On Ice was a 30-city tour, but when Yamaguchi joined, it quickly became a 60-city tour due to her ability to captivate an audience. She collaborated with a variety of choreographers to create diverse programs. "A lot of us on the Stars on Ice tour took pride in trying to stay innovative and bring something new to the ice every year," Yamaguchi noted.

== Public life and popular culture ==
=== Sponsorships, endorsements and partnerships ===
After her 1992 Olympics victory, Yamaguchi appeared in many advertisements and endorsement deals. She appeared on cereal boxes like Kellogg's Special K, on Hallmark Christmas ornaments, in ads for Got Milk? and Hoechst Celanese, as well as commercials for chains like Mervyn's, Wendy's, DuraSoft and Entenmann's doughnuts. She was also featured in ads for Campbell Soup, a sponsor of U.S. Figure Skating at the time. In 2010, Yamaguchi was engaged by P&G to help kick off its "Thanks Mom" program in connection with the 2010 Winter Olympics in Vancouver. She also collaborated with OPI and General Electric in 2011 and appeared in a TV spot for department store retail chain Kohl's in 2012. In 2018, Yamaguchi worked with the Milk Life Campaign that aims to explain the significance of milk in a well-balanced, nutritious diet. As part of the campaign, Yamaguchi recreated her "Got Milk?" ad from the 1990s and was photographed by Annie Leibowitz.

Mattel unveiled a new Barbie doll based on Yamaguchi in April 2024. The Yamaguchi Barbie doll is dressed in a detailed replication of Yamaguchi's gold and black costume from the 1992 Winter Olympics in Albertville. Yamaguchi has been represented by IMG since 1992.

=== Television ===
Yamaguchi made a public service video with the California Raisins in 1993 called "Hip to be Fit: Starring Kristi Yamaguchi and The California Raisins." She has appeared as herself on shows like Everybody Loves Raymond, Fresh Off the Boat, Hell's Kitchen and Freedom: A History of US as well as in films like D2: The Mighty Ducks, Frosted Pink, and the Disney Channel original movie Go Figure. In 2006, Yamaguchi was the host of WE tv series Skating's Next Star, created and produced by Major League Figure Skating. Yamaguchi was a local commentator on figure skating for San Jose TV station KNTV (NBC 11) during the 2006 Winter Olympics. In 2010, Yamaguchi worked as a daily NBC Olympics skating broadcast analyst on NBC's Universal Sports Network. During the 2010 Winter Olympics, Yamaguchi was also a special correspondent for the Today Show.

She performed in numerous television skating specials, including the Disney special Aladdin on Ice, in which she played Princess Jasmine, and in 2016 she hosted the "Colgate Skating Series" on ABC, a show featuring skaters such as Nancy Kerrigan, Paul Wylie, and Todd Eldridge, who performed with their families. In 2023, Yamaguchi made an appearance in Carolyn Taylor's documentary comedy series I Have Nothing that follows Taylor's comical quest to choreograph a pairs skating routine set to Whitney Houston's 1993 hit song "I Have Nothing."

On May 20, 2008, Yamaguchi became the champion of the sixth season of ABC's Dancing with the Stars, where she was paired with Mark Ballas. Yamaguchi became the first female winner since Kelly Monaco in season 1. Yamaguchi made a special appearance in the finale of the 16th season where she danced alongside Dorothy Hamill, and in November 2017, she returned to the 25th season in week eight to participate in a jazz trio with Lindsey Stirling and Mark Ballas.

Kristi Yamaguchi – Dancing with the Stars (season 6)
Week	Dance	Music	Judges' scores (Note: Individual judges' scores are listed in the following order: Carrie Ann Inaba, Len Goodman, Bruno Tonioli.)			Total score	Result
1	Foxtrot	"The More I See You" — Michael Bublé	9	9	9	27	Safe
2	Mambo	"Hey Baby" — No Doubt, featuring Bounty Killer	9	9	9	27	Safe
3	Tango	"Rio" — Duran Duran	9	9	9	27	Safe
4	Paso doble	"Blue Monday" — New Order	10	9	10	29	Safe
5	Rumba	"Say" — John Mayer	9	10	10	29	Safe
6	Jive	"Rip it Up" — Little Richard	10	10	10	30	Safe
6	Group Two-step	"Cotton-Eyed Joe" — The Nashville Riders	No scores received				Safe
7	Viennese waltz	"I'm with You" — Avril Lavigne	9	8	9	26	Safe
7	Cha-cha-cha	"Don't Stop the Music" — Rihanna	10	8	10	28	Safe
8	Quickstep	"Billy a Dick" — Klaus Hallen	9	10	10	29	Safe
8	Samba	"Volare" — Gipsy Kings	8	9	9	26	Safe
9	Tango	"Midnight Tango" — Arthur Murray Orchestra	10	9	10	29	Safe
9	Jive	"Nutbush City Limits" — Tina Turner	9	9	10	28	Safe
10 (Night 1)	Cha-cha-cha	"Dancing on the Ceiling" — Lionel Richie	10	10	10	30	Safe
10 (Night 1)	Freestyle	"Workin' Day and Night" — Michael Jackson	10	10	10	30	Safe
10 (Night 2)	Jive	"Rip it Up" — Little Richard	10	10	10	30	Winner

Kristi Yamaguchi and her book "Dream Big Little Pig" at the 2011 White House Easter Egg Roll

=== Books and magazines ===
Yamaguchi authored five books. She released Figure Skating for Dummies in 1997 followed by Always Dream, Pure Gold in 1998. In 2011, she published her award-winning children's book, Dream Big, Little Pig, which was No. 2 on the New York Times bestseller list and received the Gelett Burgess Children's Book Award. A portion of the proceeds went to the Always Dream Foundation to support early childhood literacy programs. A sequel, It's a Big World Little Pig, was published March 6, 2012. Cara's Kindness, which was illustrated by Pixar artist John Lee, was released in 2016.

Throughout the years, Yamaguchi has graced the covers of Sports Illustrated, People, and other magazines.

=== Fashion ===
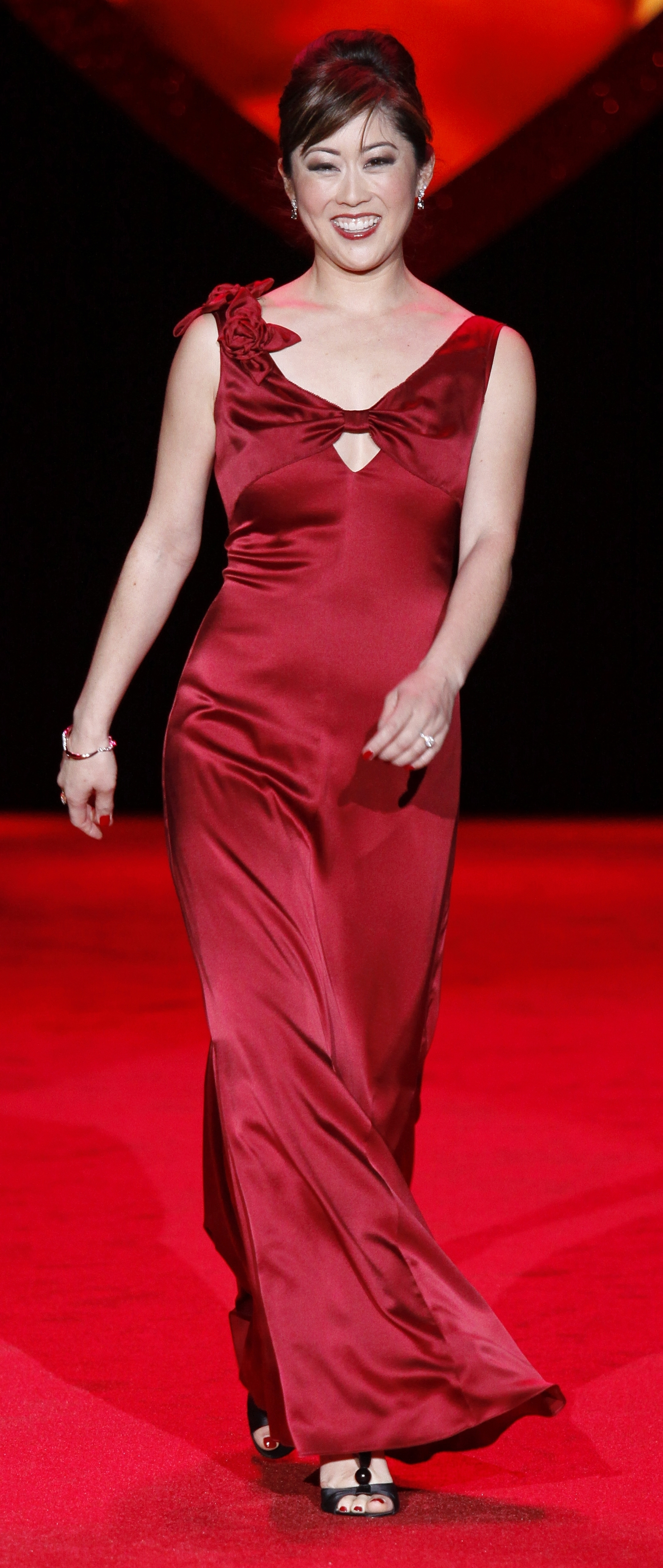
Yamaguchi at The Heart Truth fashion show in 2009

In early 2012, Yamaguchi created a woman's active wear line focused on function, comfort, and style to empower women to look good and feel good. The lifestyle brand is called Tsu.ya by Kristi Yamaguchi. "[Tsu.ya] is actually my middle name, and it was my grand-mother's name [and] a nod to my Japanese heritage. We put the period in there because we thought it would break it up and make it easier to pronounce," remarked Yamaguchi. Tsu.ya donates a portion of its proceeds to support early childhood literacy through Yamaguchi's Always Dream Foundation.

In February 2009, Kristi walked the runway with nineteen other celebrity women at the Heart Truth fashion show that took place during New York Fashion Week to raise awareness about heart disease. The Heart Truth, a national health education program, created and introduced the Red Dress as the national symbol for women and heart disease awareness in 2002, and a selection of the red designer dresses seen on the runway were later auctioned off.

=== Philanthropy and supported causes ===
In 1996, Yamaguchi established the Always Dream Foundation for children. The goal of the foundation is to provide funding for after school programs, computers, back-to-school clothes for underprivileged children, and summer camps for kids with disabilities. Commenting in 2009, she explained her inspiration for the project: "I was inspired by the Make-A-Wish Foundation to make a positive difference in children's lives. We've been helping out various children's organizations, which is rewarding. Our latest project is a playground designed so that kids of all abilities can play side by side. That's our focus now." In 2011, Yamaguchi worked with the American Lung Association, promoting their "Faces of Influenza" campaign.

Also in 2011, Kristi and the Always Dream Foundation Board decided to narrow the foundation's focus to early childhood literacy. This change was inspired by Kristi's role as a mother of two young daughters, as well as her new venture as a children's book author. In 2012, the foundation forged a partnership with Raising A Reader and the digital children's library myON, to create the Always Reading program, which integrated traditional books with e-books and 21st century technology in both the classroom and home environment. Between 2012 and 2018, the Always Reading program served more than 10,000 students and families at 24 Title 1 schools in California, Hawaiʻi, and Arizona.

In 2018, after two years of assessment and evaluation, the Always Dream Foundation worked with an expert team of education advisors to redesign the Always Reading program with the goal of targeting the home environment and supporting family engagement in reading. The Always Reading pilot program was implemented in two classrooms in Oakland, CA.

In 2020, Always Dream dropped the name "Foundation" to reflect their work as a direct service nonprofit and officially became "Kristi Yamaguchi's Always Dream." During the COVID-19 pandemic, the non-profit supplied tablets stocked with digital books, as well as internet access through a mobile data plan, to students in need. Yamaguchi was selected as one of the 2023 CNN Heroes for her work with the Always Dream Foundation.

== Accolades and impact ==
Figure skating had long been the domain of white Americans and Europeans. Yamaguchi finished ahead of two Japanese skaters at a competition in 1988 but the medal ceremony was delayed while organizers tried to track down a Japanese flag for Yamaguchi, unaware that she was American. Yamaguchi was the first Asian American to win gold at a Winter Olympic Games, paving the way for Asian American skaters that came after her like two-time Olympic medalist Michelle Kwan, 2022 Olympic champion and Team gold medalist Nathan Chen, Olympic Team gold medalist Karen Chen, and 2026 Olympic champion Alysa Liu. Five of the sixteen athletes on the U.S. team at the 2022 Winter Olympics in Beijing were of Asian descent. Four years earlier at the 2018 Games in PyeongChang, there were seven with ice dance siblings Maia Shibutani and Alex Shibutani.

Yamaguchi has received numerous awards in recognition of her achievements and impact. She was the recipient of the Inspiration Award at the 2008 Asian Excellence Awards. Two days after her Dancing with the Stars champion crowning, she received the 2008 Sonja Henie Award from the Professional Skaters Association. Among her other awards are the Thurman Munson Award, Women's Sports Foundation Flo Hyman Award, the Heisman Humanitarian Award, the Great Sports Legends Award as well as the Jesse Owens Olympic Spirit Award. She is also a member of the U.S. Olympic Committee Olympic Hall of Fame, World Skating Hall of Fame, and the US Figure Skating Hall of Fame.

== Politics ==
Yamaguchi identifies as a conservative Republican; yet, she stated in 2009 that she appreciated then-president Barack Obama as a "decision-maker", nonetheless criticizing in the same interview the state of the economy under his leadership.

In April 2024, Yamaguchi attended the state dinner for Japan hosted by Democratic president Joe Biden. Yamaguchi backed Biden during the 2020 presidential election.

== Personal life ==
On July 8, 2000, Yamaguchi married Bret Hedican, a professional ice hockey player she met at the 1992 Winter Olympics when he played for Team USA. After their wedding, Yamaguchi and Hedican resided in Raleigh, North Carolina, where Hedican played for the Carolina Hurricanes. They share two daughters: Keara and Emma. Yamaguchi and Hedican separated in 2023 and divorced in 2025.

== Programs ==
=== Singles ===
- Program details mentioned at first occurrence
- Olympic seasons highlighted in blue
- Programs performed at the Winter Olympics highlighted in **bold**

Competition and exhibition programs by season
Season	Short program	Free skate program	Exhibition program
1987–88	Malagueña: Composed by Ernesto Lecuona	Madama Butterfly: Composed by Giacomo Puccini	—N/a
1988–89	A Chorus Line: Composed by Marvin Hamlisch	Jacques Offenbach Medley: 1. La Vie parisienne 2. The Tales of Hoffmann; 3. Orpheus in the Underworld; Composed by Jacques Offenbach	One Moment in Time: Composed by Albert Hammond; Performed by Whitney Houston
1989–90	A Chorus Line	Swan Lake: Composed by Pyotr Tchaikovsky	—N/a
1990–91	La Bamba: Composed by Miles Goodman	Samson and Delilah: Composed by Camille Saint-Saëns	O mio babbino caro: Composed by Giacomo Puccini; Performed by Kiri Te Kanawa
1990–91	La Bamba: Composed by Miles Goodman	Samson and Delilah: Composed by Camille Saint-Saëns	The Yankee Doodle Boy: Performed by George M. Cohan
1991–92	**The Blue Danube**: Composed by Johann Strauss II; Choreo. by Sandra Bezic	**Malagueña**: Choreo. by Sandra Bezic	**Milord**: Performed by Édith Piaf
1991–92	**The Blue Danube**: Composed by Johann Strauss II; Choreo. by Sandra Bezic	**Malagueña**: Choreo. by Sandra Bezic	**The Yankee Doodle Boy**

Show programs as a professional skater by year
Year	Program	Event
1992	Fantaisie-Impromptu: Composed by Frédéric Chopin	1992 World Pro
1992	"My Lovin' (You're Never Gonna Get It)": Performed by En Vogue	1992 World Pro
1993	"Being Alive": Composed by Stephen Sondheim	1993 World Pro
1993	Romeo and Juliet: Composed by Nino Rota	1993 World Pro
1994	Reflections of Passion: Composed by Yanni	1994 World Pro
1994	"100% Pure Love": Performed by Crystal Waters	1994 World Pro
1994	"Doop": Performed by Doop	Ice Wars I
1994	Reflections of Passion	Ice Wars I
1995	The Seasons: Composed by Alexander Glazunov	1995 World Pro
1995	"It's Oh So Quiet": Performed by Björk	1995 World Pro
1995	"Linus and Lucy": Composed by Vince Guaraldi	Ice Wars II
1995	"I'm Gonna Be Strong": Composed by Barry Mann, Cynthia Weil; Performed by Cyndi Lauper	Ice Wars II
1996	La cumparsita: Composed by Gerardo Matos Rodríguez	1996 World Pro
1996	O mio babbino caro: Composed by Giacomo Puccini	1996 World Pro
1997	Louis Armstrong Medley: Performed by Louis Armstrong	1997 World Pro
1997	"Trouble": Performed by Elvis Presley	1997 World Pro
1999	"Smooth": Performed by Santana	Ice Wars VI
1999	"From This Moment On": Performed by Shania Twain	Ice Wars VI
2000	"Desert Rose": Performed by Sting	Ice Wars VII
2000	"(I Can't Get No) Satisfaction": Performed by The Rolling Stones	Ice Wars VII
2001	"Dance With Me Slow"	World Ice Challenge
2001	"Just a Try": Performed by Janet Jackson	World Ice Challenge

=== Pairs ===
(With Rudy Galindo)

- Program details mentioned at first occurrence

Competition programs by season
Season	Short program	Free skate program
1986–87	Another Cha-Cha: Composed by Jimmy Goings, Nicolas Skorsky; Performed by Santa Esmeralda	Medley: 1. The Tap Dance Kid; Composed by Henry Krieger; 2. 42nd Street; Composed by Henry Krieger
1987–88	—N/a	Medley: 1. The Tap Dance Kid; 2. 42nd Street
1988–89	They're Playing Our Song: Composed by Marvin Hamlisch	Romeo and Juliet: Composed by Nino Rota, Pyotr Tchaikovsky
1989–90	The Firebird: Composed by Igor Stravinsky	Coppélia: Composed by Léo Delibes

== Competitive highlights ==
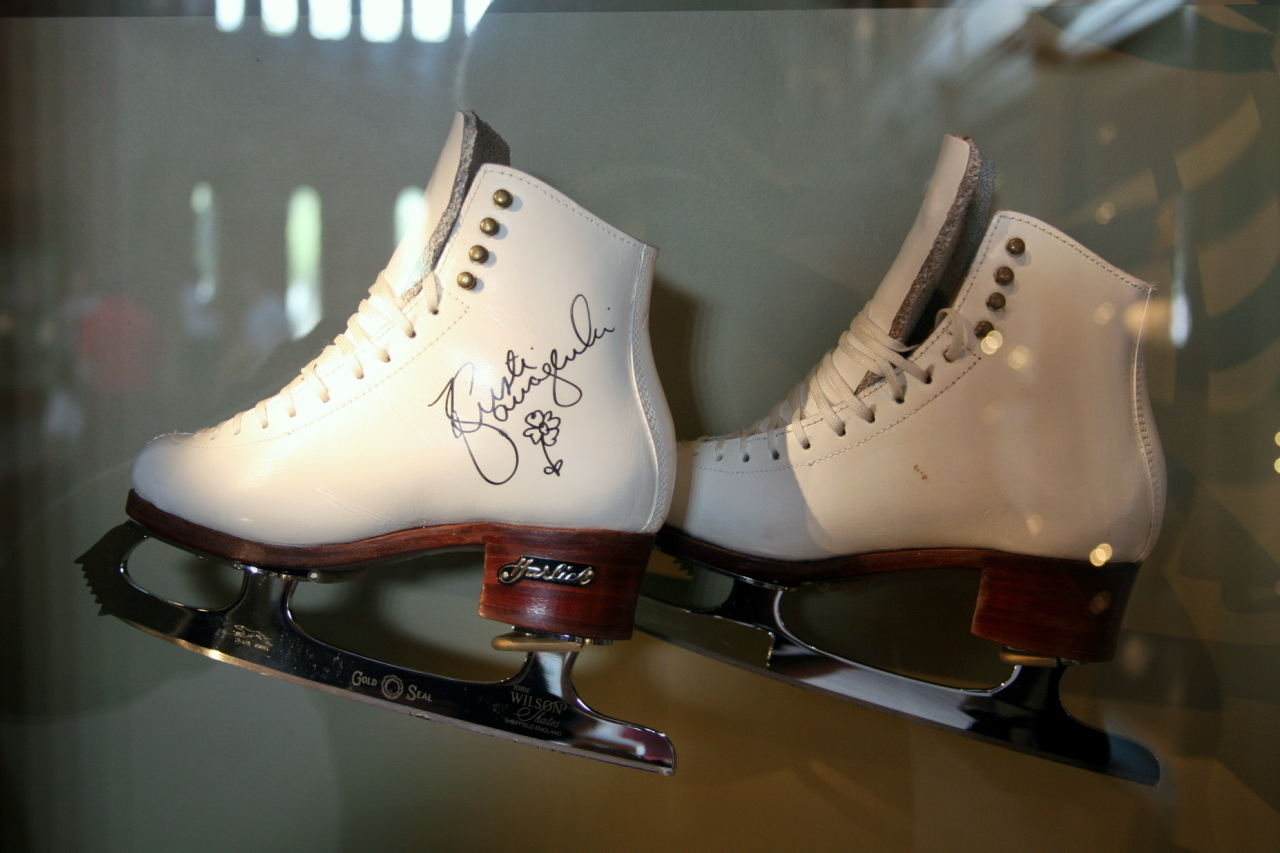
Yamaguchi's figure skates at the Museum of American History

=== Singles career ===
- GP – Event of the ISU Grand Prix Series

Competition placements at junior and senior level
Season	1986–87	1987–88	1988–89	1989–90	1990–91	1991–92
Winter Olympics						1st
World Championships			6th	4th	1st	1st
GP International de Paris						2nd
GP Nations Cup					1st	
GP NHK Trophy			2nd	2nd		
GP Skate America			3rd		1st	2nd
GP Skate Canada				1st		
Goodwill Games					1st	
U.S. Olympic Festival				1st		
World Junior Championships		1st J				
U.S. Championships	2nd J	10th	2nd	2nd	2nd	1st

=== Professional career ===
Competition placements at professional level
Season	1992–93	1993–94	1994–95	1995–96	1996–97	1997–98	1998–99	1999–00	2000–01	2001–02	2002–03	2003–04	2004–05
Battle of the Sexes on Ice					2nd								
Challenge of Champions	1st	1st	3rd			2nd	2nd						
Gold Championships			1st	1st	1st								
Ice Wars			1st	1st				1st	2nd	1st			2nd
Rock 'N' Roll Championships					1st	2nd							
Ultimate Four				3rd	2nd		2nd						
World Professional Championships	1st	2nd	1st	2nd	1st	1st				2nd			
World Team Championships			2nd	2nd	2nd		2nd						
Hershey's Figure Skating Challenge							2nd	1st					

=== Pair skating with Rudy Galindo ===
- GP – Event of the ISU Grand Prix Series
- J – junior level

Competition placements at senior and junior level
Season	1984–85	1985–86	1986–87	1987–88	1988–89	1989–90
World Championships					5th	5th
GP NHK Trophy					3rd	4th
GP Skate America			5th			2nd
Skate Electric Challenge					1st	
World Junior Championships		5th J	3rd J	1st J		
U.S. Championships	5th J	1st J	5th	5th	1st	1st

== Filmography ==
Bong Joon-ho's performances
Year	Title	Role	Notes	Ref(s)
1994	You Must Remember This	Herself / Madame X		
1994	D2: The Mighty Ducks	Herself (Cameo)		
1995	Aladdin on Ice	Jasmine		
1997	Everybody Loves Raymond	Herself (Cameo)	Episode: The Dog	
1998	The Great Skate Debate II	Skater		
2001	On Edge	Regional Judge No. 4		
2003	Freedom: A History of Us	Haruko Obata	Episode: Depression and War	
2005	Go Figure	Herself (Cameo)		
2012	Pandora Unforgettable Holiday Moments on Ice	Herself – Host		
2013	Hell's Kitchen	Herself (Dining room guest)	Episode: 17 Chefs Compete	
2018	Fresh Off the Boat	Herself / First Lady Kristi Yamaguchi-Huang	Episode: King in the North	
2023	I Have Nothing	Herself	Episode 1: Package for the Bird	

== Bibliography ==
- Yamaguchi, Kristi (December 31, 1997). Figure Skating for Dummies. Foster City, CA: IDG Books. ISBN 0-7645-5084-5. 346 p.
- ----- (April 28, 1998). Always Dream. Dallas: Taylor Publishing Company. ISBN 978-0878339969
- ----- (March 1, 2011). Dream Big Little Pig, Naperville, IL: Sourcebooks Jabberwocky. ISBN 978-0-545-44969-4. 32 p.
- ----- (March 1, 2012). It's a Big World, Little Pig!. Naperville, IL: Sourcebooks Jabberwocky. ISBN 978-1402266447. 32 p.
- ----- (October 4, 2016). Cara's Kindness. Naperville, IL: Sourcebooks Jabberwocky. ISBN 978-1492616863. 32 p.
