= Musical Theatre West =

Theatrical production company

- Formation: 1952
- Type: Theatre group
- Purpose: Musical theatre
- Location: Long Beach, California
- Coordinates: 34°7′51.33″N 118°21′2.66″W
- Artistic director: Paul Garman

Musical Theatre West is a theatrical production company in Southern California that was founded as the Whittier Civic Light Opera in 1952. It is one of southern California's oldest regional music theatre companies and draws attendees from more than one hundred areas. The company was first composed of volunteers, and after early years in which the company struggled to break even, they moved to La Mirada Civic Theatre in 1977 and rebranded as the Whittier-La Mirada Light Opera Association. Following the bankruptcy of Long Beach Civic Light Opera and an opening in the market, they made the decision to move to Long Beach and began to perform under the current name at Cal State Long Beach's Carpenter Center in 1997.

The company celebrated its 65th anniversary with its 2017/2018 season. Notable productions include those where it has acquired the original Broadway sets including the West Coast premiere of Big Fish in 2014 and Bright Star in 2018. Several notable Broadway performers, including Davis Gaines (Phantom of the Opera), Andrea McArdle (Annie), and Susan Egan (Beauty and the Beast) have performed in its productions. It has garnered several Ovation Award nominations and wins including the 2008 Ovation Award for Best Ensemble for The cast of The Andrews Brothers in its west coast premier. In 2016, Joe Langworth received the SAGE Award for Best Direction in 2016 from the LA theater critics for his work on West Side Story.

Recent productions that have garnered positive critical acclaim include Bright Star in 2018 and Grease! in 2022. The Musical Theater West production of Bright Star was directed by Richard Gatta, “giving audiences a right-on-the-mark recreation” and starred Anna Mintzer, “a true find” as Alice Murphy and Devin Archer as Billy Ray. And for Grease one review noted "Blessed by one Broadway-caliber performance after another, Musical Theatre West’s Grease will have you seeing a much-revived audience favorite with brand new eyes."

Paul Garman is the Executive Director of Musical Theatre West. He's also the longest tenured member, having begun to perform with them in 1963.
