= Figure skating at the 1994 Winter Olympics – Women's singles =

Women's singles at the XVII Olympic Winter Games
- Venue: Hamar Olympic Amphitheatre
- Dates: 23–25 February 1994
- Competitors: 27 from 16 nations

Medalists
1st place, gold medalist(s)		Oksana Baiul	Ukraine
2nd place, silver medalist(s)		Nancy Kerrigan	United States
3rd place, bronze medalist(s)		Chen Lu	China

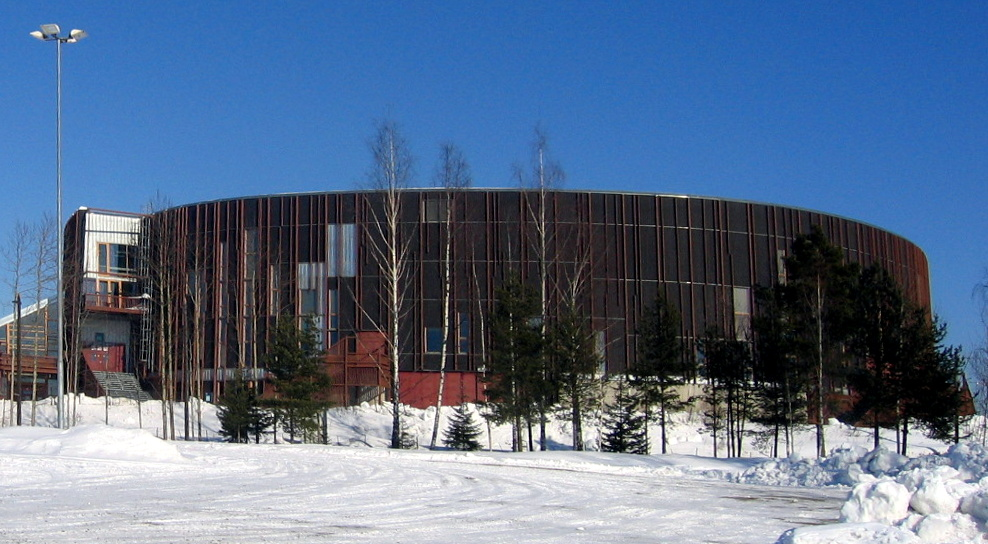
The figure skating events at the 1994 Winter Olympics were held at the Hamar Olympic Amphitheatre in Hamar, Norway.

Ladies' single skating at the 1994 Winter Olympics was contested between 23 and 25 February 1994 at the Hamar Olympic Amphitheatre. There were 27 skaters from 16 nations that participated. Oksana Baiul became the first Olympic champion representing the newly independent Ukraine. Nancy Kerrigan from the United States won the silver medal and Chen Lu from China won the bronze medal.

== Background ==
On 6 January 1994, one day before she was scheduled to compete at the 1994 U.S. Figure Skating Championships, Nancy Kerrigan was struck above the knee by an assailant with a baton and was forced to withdraw from the competition. Subsequent investigations determined that the assailant had been hired by the ex-husband of fellow skater Tonya Harding with the intention of preventing Kerrigan from competing at the U.S. Championships and the 1994 Winter Olympics.

== Results ==
Skaters received two scores from each judge on a scale from 0 to 6.0: the first for technical merit (TM) and the second for presentation (PR). In Culture on Ice, Ellyn Kestnbaum likened the first score to "how difficult the program was" and the second score to "how well it was performed". Skaters were also ranked by each judge on an ordinal scale from 1 to 27 in the short program or from 1 to 24 in the free skating.

=== Total ===
Women's results
Rank	Skater	Nation	Points	SP		FS	
1st place, gold medalist(s)	Oksana Baiul	Ukraine	2.0	2	1.0	1	1.0
2nd place, silver medalist(s)	Nancy Kerrigan	United States	2.5	1	0.5	2	2.0
3rd place, bronze medalist(s)	Chen Lu	China	5.0	4	2.0	3	3.0
4	Surya Bonaly	France	5.5	3	1.5	4	4.0
5	Yuka Sato	Japan	8.5	7	3.5	5	5.0
6	Tanja Szewczenko	Germany	8.5	5	2.5	6	6.0
7	Katarina Witt	Germany	11.0	6	3.0	8	8.0
8	Tonya Harding	United States	12.0	10	5.0	7	7.0
9	Josée Chouinard	Canada	13.0	8	4.0	9	9.0
10	Anna Rechnio	Poland	16.5	9	4.5	12	12.0
11	Krisztina Czakó	Hungary	17.0	12	6.0	11	11.0
12	Mila Kajas	Finland	18.0	16	8.0	10	10.0
13	Lenka Kulovaná	Czech Republic	19.5	11	5.5	14	14.0
14	Marie-Pierre Leray	France	20.0	14	7.0	13	13.0
15	Charlene von Saher	Great Britain	22.5	13	6.5	16	16.0
16	Nathalie Krieg	Switzerland	24.5	15	7.5	17	17.0
17	Laëtitia Hubert	France	25.0	20	10.0	15	15.0
18	Rena Inoue	Japan	27.0	18	9.0	18	18.0
19	Elena Liashenko	Ukraine	27.5	17	8.5	19	19.0
20	Marta Andrade	Spain	31.5	21	10.5	21	21.0
21	Lily Lyoonjung Lee	South Korea	32.0	24	12.0	20	20.0
22	Lyudmyla Ivanova	Ukraine	32.5	19	9.5	23	23.0
23	Liu Ying	China	33.5	23	11.5	22	22.0
24	Tsvetelina Abrasheva	Bulgaria	35.0	22	11.0	24	24.0
25	Zhao Guona	China	12.5	25	12.5	Did not advance to free skate	
26	Susan Humphreys	Canada	13.0	26	13.0	Did not advance to free skate	
27	Irena Zemanová	Czech Republic	13.5	27	13.5	Did not advance to free skate	

== In film ==
Tonya Harding's and Nancy Kerrigan's participation in the event is part of the story of the 2017 American film I, Tonya.

== Works cited ==
- Kestnbaum, Ellyn (2003). Culture on Ice: Figure Skating and Cultural Meaning. Middletown, Connecticut: Wesleyan University Press. ISBN 9780819566423.
