= Rose Muralikrishnan =

American singer-songwriter

Dr. Rose Muralikrishnan Carnatic music Indian music singer, voice trainer, composer, conductor and songwriter.

== Early life ==
Dr. Rose Muralikrishnan, a classical Carnatic music singer, voice trainer, composer, conductor, and songwriter, was born in Chennai, India and settled in the United States. Her father was a lawyer and her mother was a teacher and she was the first one of the four siblings. After completing her higher secondary education, Rose received her bachelor's degree in South Indian Music Performance and Theory from Queen Mary's College, Chennai. She then received her master's degree in Carnatic Music from the University of Madras. She received her Doctorate in Music in 2018.

She had her initial training under her school teacher Mrs. Anadavalli, and had a privilege to have an advanced music training under the guidance of Dr. S. Seetha, Dr. Suguna Varadhachari, Dr. Premila Gurumurthy, Dr. Vedavalli, Dr. N. Ramanathan, Sri Culcutta Krishnamurthy to name a few. She also had an opportunity to have her advanced performance techniques and vocal training from her Guru Dr. M. L. Vasanthakumari.

== Famous performances ==
Dr. Rose Muralikrishnan has performed numerous concerts around the world. She had performed in the major International Music festivals such as Australian International Music Festival, New York International Music Festival, Los Angeles International Music Festival to name a few. she had taken Carnatic music to the finest venues around the world such as Sydney Opera House, Carnegie Hall, Walt Disney Concert Hall, Hollywood Bowl, Shrine Auditorium and many more. She had also performed in major Music Festivals in California such as the Music Academy of the West, the Center for Jazz and World Music Festival, CSU San Marcos International Music Festival, UCSB's Day of Music. She had also performed in many finest prestigious venues around the world such as the Sydney Opera House, Carnegie Hall, Walt Disney Concert Hall, Shrine Auditorium, and famous University theaters such as UCLA's Schonberg Hall, SDSU's Montezuma and Smith Recital Hall, UCSD's Mandeville Theater USC's Annenberg Auditorium, UCLB's Carpenter's Performing Arts Theater, UCSB, and the Salk Institute of San Diego. She served the community through music performances and lectures and demonstrations to promote Indian music and culture in the United States. Her community services also include educating South Asian as well as non-music major students and other members of the community through her lectures and performances.

== Teaching music ==
Dr. Rose Muralikrishnan has been teaching Carnatic vocals to students around the world for the past 40 years. She is a Founder, CEO, and Artistic Director of Spring Nectar Foundation for Indian Music & Heritage. She was an adjunct professor of South Indian Music at San Diego State University. She worked as the Principal of the music school at the Santhome Communication Center, Madras, India and her performances are often broadcast on Indian Television and All India Radio. Before she joined the center she started her teaching career in 1986 as a music instructor at the Jiddhu Krishnamurthy Foundation, Rishi Valley School, Andhra Pradesh, India.

== Productions ==
Dr. Rose Muralikrishnan's Indian Music ensemble won Gold Awards in world’s finest venues such as Sydney Opera House, Carnegie Hall, Walt Disney Concert Hall to name a few. Her production entitled Gayaka Vadhya Brundham was first live performance in the United States to revive the 2000-year-old traditional art called Vadhya Brundham (Orchestral music) of India at Carpenter Performing Arts Center in 1996. While she was a principal of the Music school at Santhome Communication Center she composed, directed, conducted and sang for many music productions, dance dramas and audio visual productions with several leading performers such as Dr. M. Balamuralikrishna, Sudha Raghunathan and Rajkumar Bharathy to name a few. She composed music for several dance drama productions and worked with famous Nattuvanars such as Udupi Lakshminarayana, Adayar Lakshmanan, Sitarama Sharma, Alarmelu Valli, and Dhananjayans.

== Albums ==
Sri Ganesha Samarpanam - Compositions of Lord Ganesha Sringaram - Compositions of Lord Subramanya
