= Oksana Baiul =

Ukrainian figure skater

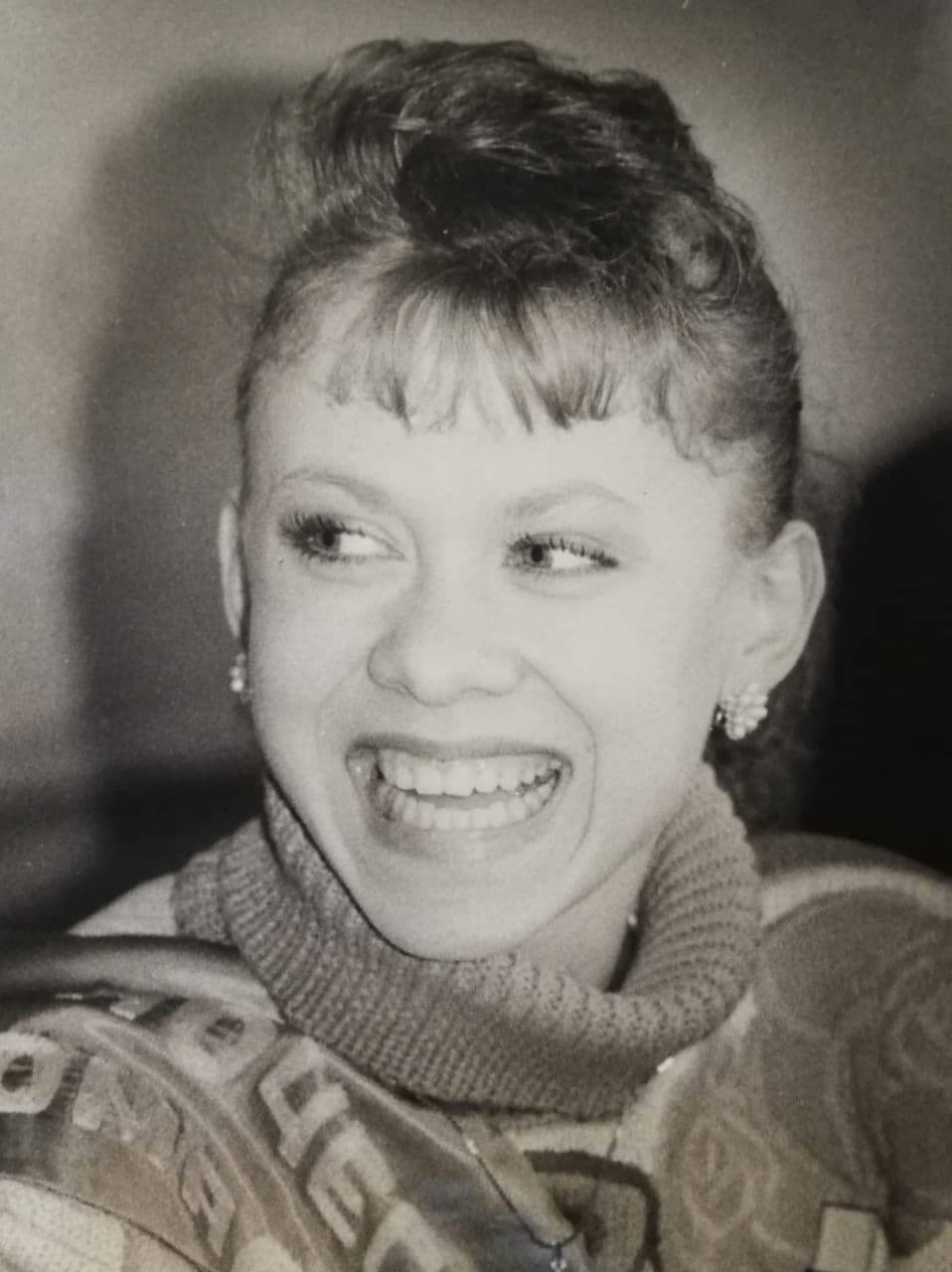

Personal information
- Native name: Оксана Баюл
- Born: 16 November 1977 (age 48) Dnipropetrovsk, Ukrainian SSR, Soviet Union (now Dnipro, Ukraine)
- Height: 1.60 m (5 ft 3 in)

Figure skating career
- Country: Ukraine
- Retired: 1994
Medal record
Figure skating: Ladies' singles
Representing Ukraine
Olympic Games
Gold medal – first place	1994 Lillehammer	Ladies' singles
World Championships
Gold medal – first place	1993 Prague	Ladies' singles
European Championships
Silver medal – second place	1993 Helsinki	Ladies' singles
Silver medal – second place	1994 Copenhagen	Ladies' singles

Oksana Serhiyivna Baiul-Farina (Note: Ukrainian: Оксана Сергіївна Баюл-Фаріна, romanized: Oksana Serhiivna Baiul-Farina) (née Baiul; born November 16, 1977) is a Ukrainian retired competitive figure skater. She was the 1993 world champion and the 1994 Olympic champion in ladies' singles.

Baiul is the first Olympic Champion from Ukraine to compete under the Ukrainian flag. Baiul is the second skater representing Ukraine to win gold at the Winter Olympics after Viktor Petrenko in 1992. (Note: Viktor Petrenko represented the Unified Team when he won gold at the 1992 Olympics.) (Note: Ukraine won its second Winter Games gold medal in the women's biathlon relay victory at the 2014 Winter Olympics, and its third in the men's freestyle skiing aerials at the 2018 Winter Olympics.) She is also the first Olympic champion of independent Ukraine in any sport.

After winning the gold medal in 1994, Baiul decided to move to the United States and participate in professional ice skating tours and shows. She followed one of her coaches to Connecticut. Later, she also became involved in a variety of TV appearances, and benefit skates. She has lived in the United States since 1994. In 1997, she published two books, a memoir about her life and one on skating.

== Early life and education ==
Baiul was born on 16 November 1977 in Dnipropetrovsk, Ukrainian SSR, Soviet Union, an industrial city famous for manufacturing Soviet missiles. Her parents divorced when she was two years old, and her father, Sergey Baiul—who died in 2006—disappeared shortly after. No one is certain whether he deserted his family or was pressured to leave town when he and his wife divorced. She was raised by her mother, Marina, a French teacher, and her maternal grandparents. In addition to having Ukrainian ancestry, she is of Romanian-Jewish descent through her maternal grandmother and of Russian descent through her maternal grandfather.

Her grandfather died in 1987 and her grandmother in 1988. In 1991, her mother, who had been very healthy, died suddenly of ovarian cancer when Baiul was 13. Her father appeared at her mother's funeral, but Baiul wanted nothing to do with him. She lived with the wife of her coach, Stanislav Koritek, who had moved to Canada, and then with friends.

After moving to Odesa in mid-1992, Baiul lived chiefly in a dormitory. Her expenses were covered by the state because of her promise in skating. In 1993 she lived for a month with coach Galina Zmievskaya between the European and World championships.

== Move to the United States ==
After the 1994 Winter Olympics, Baiul moved to the United States and started living in Simsbury, Connecticut, the home of the International Skating Center of Connecticut. In the late 1990s, she followed her coach, Valentyn Nikolayev, to Richmond, Virginia, where she lived for several years before moving to Cliffside Park, New Jersey. After residing there for 14 years, Baiul moved to Pennsylvania in March 2012, settling in Upper Makefield Township, Bucks County.

In January 1997 (three years after winning the gold medal), Baiul was arrested for driving under the influence of alcohol after crashing her car into a tree in Bloomfield, Connecticut. The charges were dropped after she met the terms of probation and completed an alcohol education program. Her drinking problem worsened, however. In May 1997, she entered an alcohol rehabilitation program for two and a half months. In a 2004 interview, she said she had been sober for six years, adding,"This is more important than Olympic gold."

=== Religious views ===
Baiul was raised as a Russian Orthodox Christian. As a child, she heard rumors that her maternal grandmother was Jewish. In 2003, years after her father left the family, she phoned her old rink in Dnipro to ask for assistance in locating him. Assuming it was a prank, they hung up twice. Eventually Baiul convinced them of her identity. The rink manager helped her reunite with her father Sergey Baiul in September 2003, when she was 25 years old.

He confirmed that her Romanian maternal grandmother was Jewish. According to Orthodox Judaism, her mother and Baiul would also be classified as halakhically Jewish. Baiul decided to identify as Jewish because of the custom of matrilineality in Judaism. In 2005 she said, "Being Jewish, that feels good. It feels natural, like a second skin".

== Education and training ==
As a child, Baiul was interested in ballet, but was told she did not have the right body type. Her grandmother took her to skating lessons, saying it was ballet on skates. Her grandfather was also supportive of her skating, which she began at age three in Dnipro. He believed that she could be a future prima ballerina and that skating was a fine training ground for dance. Baiul pursued ballet, but ultimately chose ice skating. As she trained, her mother paid for her training expenses, including lessons, costumes, and equipment. By the age of five, she was studying with Stanislav Koritek, a prominent Ukrainian coach.

She was coached by Koritek until he was offered a coaching job in Toronto, Ontario, in March 1992. He accepted due to lack of support for the sport in Ukraine, which was struggling economically after the collapse of the Soviet Union. In August 1992 his father, Alfred Koritek, vice-president of the Ukrainian skating federation, called coach Halyna Zmievska on Baiul's behalf. She took her on as a student, arranging for the girl to move to her home in Odesa. Zmievska welcomed her into her circle of elite skaters and provided her shelter in her family's cramped three-room apartment in the city. Under Zmievska's training, Baiul made rapid progress. Her other coach in Odesa was Valentyn Nikolayev. She represented FSC "Ukraine" (Odesa, Dnipro).

== Competitive career ==
=== 1993 European and World championships ===
Baiul began competing and took the silver medal at the 1993 European Championships in Helsinki, finishing second to Surya Bonaly of France.

Prior to the 1993 World Championships in Prague, Baiul had crashed into the boards and displaced disks in her back and neck. At the event, she stopped practicing and consulted a Czech doctor. She competed in skates with crooked blades because it was too late to try a new pair. Ranked second in the short program and first in the free skate, she finished ahead of Bonaly and became world champion at age 15.

=== 1994 European Championships and Winter Olympics ===
In 1994, Baiul won the silver medal at the European Championships in Copenhagen, again finishing second to Bonaly. At the 1994 Winter Olympics, she was second to American Nancy Kerrigan after the short program of Ladies' singles. During a practice session before the long program, she collided with Germany's Tanja Szewczenko, sustaining a wrenched lower back and a cut on her right shin, which required three stitches. As others continued practicing, Katarina Witt skated out, helping Baiul off the ice.

She received two Olympic-approved pain-killing injections of anaesthetics in her lower back and shoulder, which enabled her to compete in the free skate. She won the free skate over Kerrigan. She added one additional triple jump towards the end of her skating program that was not originally planned in her program. By the slimmest of margins, she won the gold medal. It was a controversial win that was defended by the referee, who said that Baiul had skated in an artistic and engaging style while Kerrigan skated cautiously. She won the Olympic gold medal at the age of 16 years and 101 days, becoming one of the youngest figure skating Olympic champions. Kerrigan placed second and Chen Lu from China placed third. Baiul was announced as the winner after Surya Bonaly and Katarina Witt completed their respective programs out of medal contention. In addition to her Olympic title, Ukraine named her in 1994 as a Merited Master of Sports.

=== Professional career (touring) ===
Despite their status as Olympic champions, Baiul and Viktor Petrenko faced difficulties in Odesa, as did fellow Ukrainians across the country. The country was struggling economically, and conditions at their rink in Odesa had deteriorated severely as the government could not extend financial support for figure skating following the breakup of the Soviet Union. Lacking a working ice resurfacer, coaches and skaters often had to resurface the rink ice by hand.

Such conditions influenced Baiul's decision to turn professional after the 1994 Winter Olympics, although she was only 16 years old. Zmievskaya negotiated a very profitable contract for her to tour the United States following the Olympics and earn money with her sport. In May 1994, at age 16, Baiul signed an agreement with the American talent agency William Morris Endeavor.

Baiul said later that her drinking problems began during this tour. She said:

"Except myself, nearly all the figure skaters on the bus were grown-ups, and it was full of alcohol. Most of the skaters were Russians and Americans, and they all drank. That's when I tried it. I was very young, with no one to teach me the right. I thought it was the norm, 'cause as a teenager you don't want to break away from the majority."

Following the Olympics, Baiul was plagued by physical ailments that affected her skating ability. She required arthroscopic knee surgery in the summer of 1994, after which she was advised by her doctor not to return to the ice for two months. Due to the million-dollar touring contract, however, Baiul ignored the doctor's recommendations. She resumed skating in two weeks and returned to performing in six, but her jumping ability became hindered.

Year	Event	Notes
1983–91	Trained with Stanislav Korytek	
1991	Lived and trained in Odesa, Ukraine with Galina Zmievskaya	Shortly after her mother's death
1991	12th place, Soviet Championship	
1993	Runner-up, European Championship	
1993	Women's figure skating gold medalist, World Championship in Prague	
1994	Gold medalist, Olympics	
1994	Performed in U.S. Outdoor Skating Challenge	For the CBS television network
1994	A Promise Kept, a television movie based on Baiul's life	For the CBS television network
1994	Had knee surgery	September
1994	Toured with the Tom Collins World Champions Tour	
1994	Featured on a Barbara Walters Special	One of the Ten Most Fascinating Personalities of 1994

== Life after retirement from competition ==
In 1994, Zmievskaya was asked to lead the coaching staff at Simsbury, Connecticut's newly built International Skating Center. Both Baiul and Viktor Petrenko followed her there to train with her.

Baiul portrayed Clara and Dorothy Gale in the CBS productions of The Nutcracker on Ice and The Wizard of Oz on Ice, respectively. In May 1997, she was dropped from the Champions on Ice tour due to concerns about her drinking.

She decided to part ways with Zmievskaya the same year. Baiul had completed a rehab program and, in August 1998, she began training under Natalia Linichuk at the University of Delaware's skating center. She has continued to skate professionally from time to time, including an engagement with the touring show Broadway on Ice.

In December 2006, Baiul traveled to Russia and skated at the Red Square ice rink in Moscow, alongside champions from Russia, China, France, and other countries. In February 2007, she collaborated with Saule Rachmedova, a renowned ballet dancer, to bring together Ice Theatre of New York and couture fashion for the debut of fashion designer Levi Okunov's "Winter Collection." The following month, she appeared on MTV's Total Request Live.

Baiul had a role in the skating stage musical, Cold as Ice. The story explores six skaters from Canada, Russia, and the United States preparing for national championships and the Olympics while dealing with demanding coaches, stage mothers, stage coaches, and other trials. The story was conceived and written by former skater Frank D'Agostino. A full stage version of Cold As Ice was produced and presented by the Gateway Playhouse in May 2007.

On 8 March 2009, and again on 14 March 2010, Baiul made guest appearances at the Kate Wollman Skating Rink at Prospect Park in Brooklyn, New York, as part of its annual show. She also took part in meet-and-greet sessions with skating students after each performance.

Baiul has her own line of clothing and jewelry. In November 2005, she appeared on the Bravo television program Celebrity Poker Showdown. She was also part of the celebrity panel of judges (along with Steve Garvey and Jonny Moseley) on the ABC show Master of Champions, which aired briefly in 2006.

In November 2011, her manager (and future husband), Carlo Farina, discovered accounting and collection discrepancies in her account at William Morris Endeavor. After collecting $9.5 million from the company, Baiul filed a lawsuit in November 2012 in Los Angeles for an additional $1 million in compensatory damages and more in punitive damages. She sued NBCUniversal in February 2013 for their alleged illicit promotional use of her likeness. Having withdrawn the November case, she filed a broader lawsuit in New York in October 2013.

In January 2015, Baiul publicly accused her former coaches and compatriots Galina Zmievskaya, Viktor Petrenko, and their manager, Joseph Lemire, of fraud, claiming they "have been stealing money" from her for more than a decade. In addition, she accused Lemire of fraudulent attempts to represent her in multiple court proceedings in Ukraine against the state, concerning various assets.

== Personal life ==
In 2012 she married her manager Carlo Farina in Pennsylvania and took the name Oksana Baiul-Farina. In 2022, the couple moved to Shreveport, Louisiana in pursuit of a business venture. In 2025, Farina filed for divorce from Baiul. Baiul subsequently put her Shreveport home up for sale and announced she was moving back to Las Vegas, Nevada.

== Representation in other media ==
- A Promise Kept (1994) is a CBS-produced TV movie made about Baiul.
- Baiul is mentioned in the Family Guy TV series episode, "Wasted Talent" (season 2, episode 20), during brewmaster Pawtucket Pat's song about his brewery, in a reference to her DUI. She was also noted in the TV series episode,"The Griffin Winter Talent" (Season 17, episode 7).
- The song, "Oksana", by Hawksley Workman, appears on the songwriter's album, Median Age Wasteland. It is about Baiul.
- In the film I, Tonya (2017), she is played by actress Cassidy Balkcom (in an uncredited role), winning the gold medal in the 1994 Winter Olympics against American competitor Nancy Kerrigan (played by Caitlin Carver).
- In the film Blades of Glory (2007), Chazz Michael Michaels (played by Will Ferrell) claims to have been her one-time lover. As a possible reference to her nerves of steel, Chazz exclaims she's colder than ice, colder than dry ice: "Wait, what's colder than dry ice? I'll tell you what is. Oksana..."
- In the opening of Kimberly Akimbo’s “Skater Planet,” Martin, part of the teen quartet, retorts, “Like you’re Oksana Baiul out there!” in response to Teresa's teasing.

=== Charitable involvements ===
On 27 March 2010, Baiul skated at a figure skating exhibition for One Step Closer HIV AIDS. Directed and produced by Tim David, the benefit was for the AIDS Resource Foundation for Children. Baiul performed her signature Swan Lake program and was part of the meet-and-greet after the show.

Baiul supports the Tikva Children's Home Charity, which works to aid the Jewish children of Odesa. In addition, she supports and is a member of the International Museum of Women. This celebrates the lives of women around the world.

== Results ==
Oksana Baiul career performances.

International
Event	89–90	90–91	92–93	93–94
Olympics				1st
Worlds			1st	
Europeans			2nd	2nd
Skate America				1st
Nations Cup			4th	2nd
Prague Skate			5th	
National
Ukrainian Champ.			1st	1st
Soviet Champ.	12th	10th		

=== Professional career ===
Competition placements at professional level
Season	1994–95	1995-96	1996-97	1997-98	1998-99	1999–00	2000–21	2001–02	2002-03	2003-04	2004-05	2005-06	2006-07
Challenge of Champions					5th								
Gold Championships	2nd	2nd											
Ice Wars	2nd	2nd		1st	2nd	2nd				1st	1st	2nd	1st
Rock 'N' Roll Championships		1st	2nd		3rd								
World Professional Championships				6th	5th	4th	5th						
World Team Championships										4th	4th	4th	

== See also ==
- List of Olympic medalists in figure skating
