= Monrovia, Alabama =

- Unincorporated community
- Location within Alabama Location within the United States
- Coordinates: 34°47′11″N 86°42′50″W
- Country: United States
- State: Alabama
- County: Madison
- Elevation: 748 ft (228 m)
- Time zone: UTC-6 (Central (CST))
  - Summer (DST): UTC-5 (CDT)
- Area code: 256
- GNIS feature ID: 152361

Monrovia, also known as Vaughn Corners or Thompson Mill, is an unincorporated community in Madison County, Alabama, United States. It is bordered on the south by the city of Madison, on the southeast by the city of Huntsville, on the west by Limestone County and on the north by the community of Harvest.

== History ==
A post office operated under the name Monrovia from 1878 to 1904.

Jeff Gin, located on the southwest corner of the intersection of Jeff Road and Nick Davis Road, began operation in 1956. It was started by brothers Erle and Wilburn Douglass. At that time the gin was called Douglass Brothers and was one of 26 gins in Madison County. Along with the gin, Erle had a farming operation with Jack Vandiver called Douglass & Vandiver. Jack Vandiver ended up managing the gin. By 1972, Wilburn Douglass and Jack Vandiver realized they did not have enough time to farm and run a gin, so a decision was made to make the gin a co-op, and the name was changed to Jeff Gin Company.

== Education ==
The area is part of the Madison County School System. Area schools include

- Endeavor Elementary School
- Legacy Elementary School
- Monrovia Elementary School
- Monrovia Middle School
- Sparkman Middle School
- Sparkman High School

== Public services ==
The community is served by the Harvest-Monrovia Water and Sewer Authority. The water system maintains several large storage tanks and has a substantial new water treatment facility.

The Madison County Sheriff's Department administers law and order in Monrovia.

Monrovia Fire/Rescue is a large volunteer fire department of approximately 81 members serving the residents of west central Madison County.

The Huntsville Madison County Public Library maintains a branch, The Monrovia Public Library, in the Monrovia Community Center on Allen Drake Dr. near Phillips Park.

== Recreation ==
The Monrovia Parks and Recreation Association is the owner and operator of Phillips Park and operates youth sports leagues, primarily Babe Ruth baseball and softball. MPRA is a private, non-profit organization run by a board of directors.

== Notable people ==
- Caitlin Carver, actress
