= Capshaw =

Capshaw may refer to:

== Places ==
- Capshaw, Alabama, an unincorporated community in eastern Limestone County, Alabama
- Capshaw Mountain, a mountain located in Harvest, Alabama

== People ==
- Coran Capshaw, American band manager, record label founder, and real estate mogul
- Jessica Capshaw (born 1976), American actress
- Kate Capshaw (born 1953), American actress

== Fictional characters ==
- Neely Capshaw, a fictional character from the TV series Baywatch
