= Nancy Kerrigan =

American figure skater (born 1969)

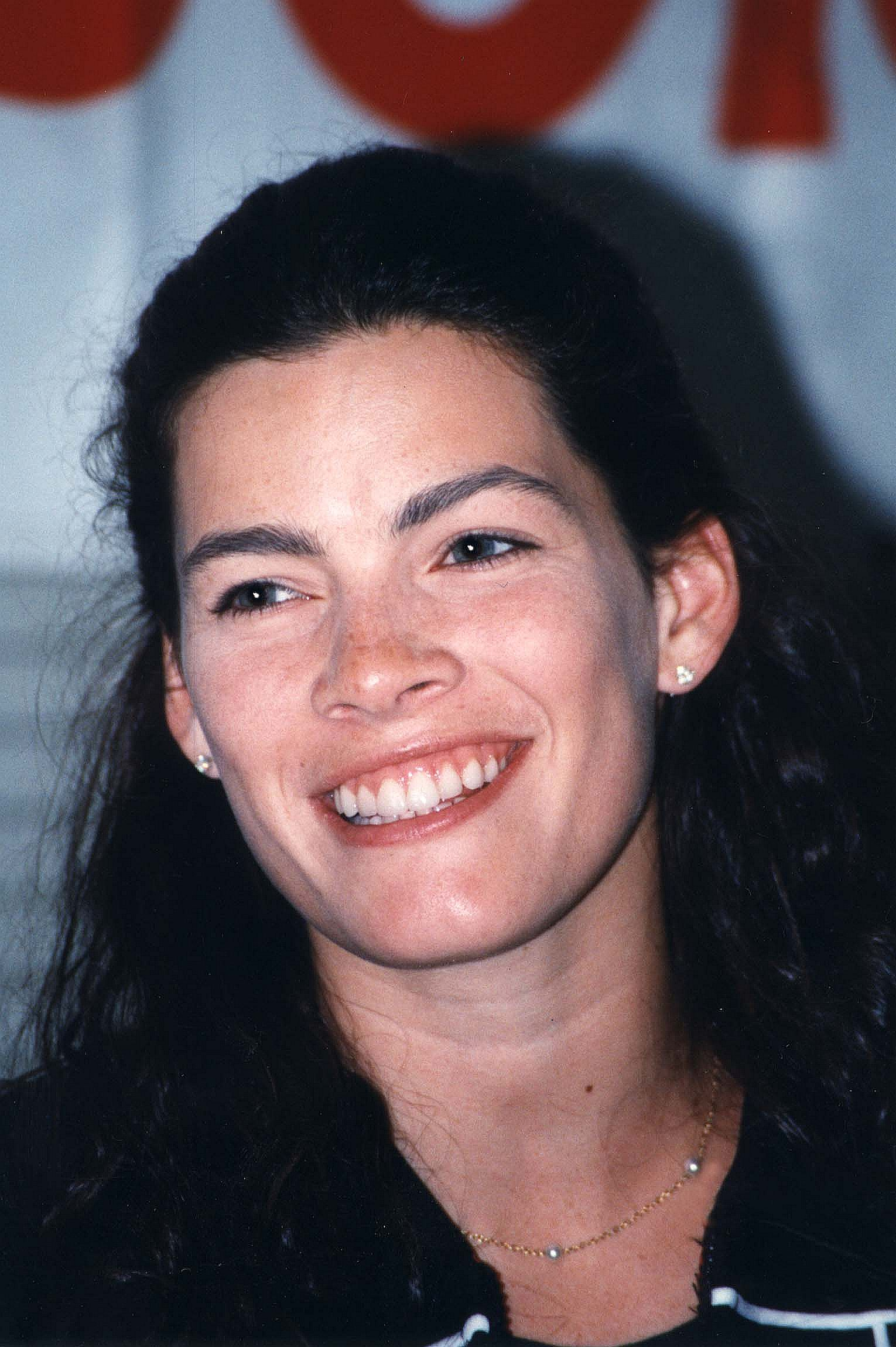
- Kerrigan in 1995

Personal information
- Full name: Nancy Ann Kerrigan
- Born: October 13, 1969 (age 57) Stoneham, Massachusetts, U.S.
- Height: 5 ft 4 in (163 cm)

Figure skating career
- Country: United States
- Retired: 1994
Medal record
Representing the United States
Ladies' figure skating
Olympic Games
Silver medal – second place	1994 Lillehammer	Ladies' singles
Bronze medal – third place	1992 Albertville	Ladies' singles
World Championships
Silver medal – second place	1992 Oakland	Ladies' singles
Bronze medal – third place	1991 Munich	Ladies' singles
U.S. Championships
Gold medal – first place	1993 Arizona	Women's singles
Silver medal – second place	1992 Florida	Women's singles
Bronze medal – third place	1991 Minnesota	Women's singles
Winter Universiade
Bronze medal – third place	1989 Sofia	Ladies' singles

Nancy Ann Kerrigan (born October 13, 1969) is an American former figure skater. She won bronze medals at the 1991 World Championships and the 1992 Winter Olympics, silver medals at the 1992 World Championships and the 1994 Winter Olympics, as well as the 1993 US National Figure Skating Championship. Kerrigan was inducted into the United States Figure Skating Hall of Fame in 2004.

On January 6, 1994, an assailant used a police baton to strike Kerrigan on her landing knee; the attacker was hired by Jeff Gillooly, ex-husband of her rival Tonya Harding. The attack injured Kerrigan, but she quickly recovered. Harding and Kerrigan both participated in the 1994 Winter Olympics, but after the Games, Harding was permanently banned from competitive figure skating. At the Olympics, Kerrigan won the silver medal in a controversial showdown with gold medal winner Oksana Baiul. She then started touring and performed with several ice skating troupes that included Champions on Ice and Broadway on Ice. In 2017, she was a contestant on Dancing with the Stars.

== Early life ==
Kerrigan was born in Stoneham, Massachusetts, the youngest child and only daughter of welder Daniel Kerrigan (1939–2010) and homemaker Brenda Kerrigan (née Schultz, b. 1940). She is of English, Irish, and German ancestry, and has stated: "There's very little Irish in me, just my name." While her brothers Michael and Mark played hockey, she took up figure skating at age six. She did not start private lessons until age eight and won her first competition, the Boston Open, at age nine.

Kerrigan's family was of modest means. Her father sometimes worked three jobs to fund her skating career; he and her brother Mark also drove the Zamboni at the local rink in exchange for Nancy's lessons. However, the price of lessons were still too high, so neighbor Yvonne Gattineri and her family helped support Nancy's career paying for her coach. Kerrigan was coached by Theresa Martin until she was 16, then began working with Evy and Mary Scotvold after a brief period with Denise Morrissey. The Scotvolds remained her coaches through the rest of her competitive career.

== Skating career ==
Kerrigan began to reach prominence at the national level when she placed fourth at the junior level at the 1987 U.S. Figure Skating Championships. She made an early impression as a strong jumper, but was comparatively weak in compulsory figures. She made her senior debut the following season, moving up the national rankings each year: 12th in 1988, fifth in 1989 when she won the bronze medal at the 1989 Winter Universiade, and fourth in 1990. She continued to be held back by compulsory figures until they were eliminated from competitions after the 1990 season.

=== 1991–1993 competitions ===
Kerrigan's rise at the national level continued when she placed third at the 1991 U.S. Figure Skating Championships. She qualified for the 1991 World Figure Skating Championships, where she won the bronze medal. Her medal was part of the first-ever sweep of the women's podium by a single country at the World Championships, as her teammates Kristi Yamaguchi and Tonya Harding won gold and silver, respectively.

In the 1992 season, Kerrigan again improved on her placement at the previous year's national championships by finishing second. She won a bronze medal (Yamaguchi took the gold) in the 1992 Winter Olympics and earned the silver medal at the 1992 World Championships.

The following season—with Yamaguchi retired from eligible competition—Kerrigan became United States champion, even though her performance was flawed. She admitted that she would have to improve her skating in time for the World Championships. She won the short program at the World Championships in Prague, but had a disastrous free skate that resulted in her tumbling to fifth in the standings. It was followed by an even worse performance at a televised pro-am event, where she fell three times, botched the landing of another jump, and appeared dazed and depressed, losing to 1988 Olympian Caryn Kadavy.

Before and after the 1992 Olympics, Kerrigan had many corporate sponsorship contracts (with companies such as Campbell's Soup, Evian, Reebok, and Seiko) and opportunities to perform professionally, which were permitted after the International Skating Union abolished the earlier strict amateur status rules that had governed eligibility for the sport. In preparation for the 1994 Winter Olympics, she curtailed these activities to focus on her training, instead. She also began working with a sports psychologist to better handle her nerves in competition.

=== 1994 assault ===
On January 6, 1994, at the U.S. Figure Skating Championships in Detroit, as Kerrigan was walking through a corridor at Cobo Arena immediately after a practice session, she was bludgeoned on the right knee with a police baton by an assailant, who was later apprehended and identified as Shane Stant. The assault was planned by rival Tonya Harding's ex-husband Jeff Gillooly and conspirator Shawn Eckardt. The conspirators' goal was to prevent Kerrigan from competing in both the National Championships and the Lillehammer 1994 Olympics.

The attack's immediate aftermath was recorded on a TV camera and broadcast around the world. The initial footage showed the attendants helping Kerrigan as she grabbed at her knee, crying out: "Why, why, why?" Kerrigan was also seen being carried away by her father, Daniel. Harding won the championship, with Michelle Kwan second. Although Kerrigan's injury forced her to withdraw from the U.S. Championships, her fellow skaters agreed that she merited one of the two spots on the Olympic team. The USFSA chose to name her to the Olympic team rather than Kwan, who was sent to Lillehammer as an alternate in the event that Harding were to be removed from the team.

Kerrigan recovered quickly from her injury and resumed her intensive training. She practiced by doing complete back-to-back, double run-throughs of her programs until she felt completely confident in her ability to compete under pressure. The fame caused by huge media coverage of the attack led to further opportunities; she was reported to have already signed endorsement contracts for $9.5 million before the Olympics began.

Harding denied any involvement in the planning of the attack, but later pleaded guilty to conspiring to hinder the prosecution. In late 2005, Kerrigan expressed objections to Shane Stant's wishes to have the attack removed from his record so he could join the Navy SEALs, which do not recruit anyone with a felony conviction. Kerrigan stated in a letter dated November 25, 2005, that "to allow Stant to have the attack removed from his record would not only be an insult to [her], but it [also] would send the message that a crime like that can ultimately be swept under the rug." Stant's request had already been denied by a judge, saying that it is against the law to expunge an assault conviction. Stant was 34 when he tried to remove the attack from his record.

The attack was depicted in the 2017 film I, Tonya.

=== 1994 Winter Olympics ===
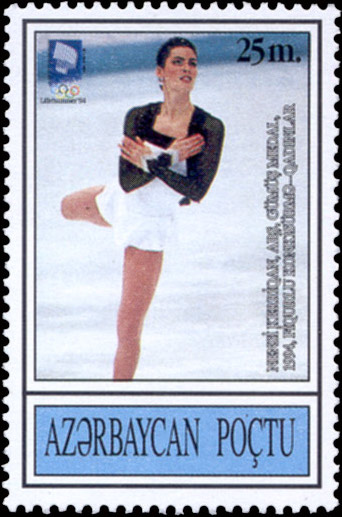
Kerrigan on an Azerbaijani postage stamp, dedicated to the 1994 Winter Olympics

The women's single skating event of the 1994 Winter Olympics in the Hamar Olympic Amphitheatre of Norway took place seven weeks after the attack, and Kerrigan skated what she considered to be the best two performances of her life in the short program and free skate. She won the silver medal, finishing second to Oksana Baiul, and ahead of Chen Lu as Tonya Harding finished in eighth place amid controversy. Harding had trouble with her equipment (the laces on her skates) and was given a reskate by the judges. Kerrigan was in first place after the short program, but lost the free skate and the gold medal to Baiul in a close and controversial 5–4 decision.

Kerrigan appeared to display dissatisfaction and disappointment with her second-place finish. While Kerrigan and Chen waited over 20 minutes for Olympic officials to find a copy of the Ukrainian national anthem, someone mistakenly told Kerrigan the delay in the presentation was because Baiul had cried off her make-up and was getting it retouched. Kerrigan, with obvious frustration, was caught on-camera saying, "Oh, come on. So she's going to get out here and cry again. What's the difference?" CBS chose to air the undiplomatic comment, marking a distinct shift in the way Kerrigan was portrayed in the media, which had been somewhat protective of her image up to that point because of the attack against her.

Kerrigan elected not to attend the closing ceremonies at the Olympics. Her agent claimed this was because Norwegian security had advised her to leave due to death threats that had been made against her, but this was later denied. Instead, she left Norway early to take part in a prearranged publicity parade at Walt Disney World, her $2-million sponsor.

=== 1994 Walt Disney World parade ===
Following the 1994 Winter Olympics, Kerrigan participated in a Walt Disney World parade. She was caught on microphone saying to Mickey Mouse, "This is so dumb. I hate it. This is the most corny thing I have ever done." She later said that her remark was taken out of context and she was not commenting on being in the parade but rather on her agent's insistence that she wear her silver medal in the parade. She said that her parents had always taught her not to show off or brag about her accomplishments. She added that she had nothing against Disney or Mickey Mouse: "Who could find fault with Mickey Mouse? He's the greatest mouse I've ever known."

Commenting on the media backlash, Mike Barnicle of The Boston Globe said, "Now the thing is over so we've got to kill her. That's us [the media], not her." Either because of the bad publicity or her own inclinations, some of Kerrigan's previously announced endorsements and television deals were dropped after the Olympics.

=== Skating results ===
International
Event	1984–85	1985–86	1986–87	1987–88	1988–89	1989–90	1990–91	1991–92	1992–93	1993–94
Olympics								3rd		2nd
Worlds							3rd	2nd	5th	WD
Skate America						5th			2nd	
Lalique						3rd	3rd			
NHK Trophy			5th							
Nations Cup								1st		
Goodwill Games						5th				
Piruetten										1st
Novarat Trophy				1st						
Universiade					3rd					
Skate Electric							3rd			
National
U.S. Champ.	9th N.	11th J.	4th J.	12th	5th	4th	3rd	2nd	1st	WD
U.S. Olympic Festival					3rd	1st				

=== Skating honors ===
Kerrigan was inducted into the United States Figure Skating Hall of Fame in 2004. She was also honored at Ice Theatre of New York's annual benefit gala in 2008.

=== Skating outfits ===
Kerrigan's Olympic skating outfits were designed by fashion designer Vera Wang. Along with Christian Lacroix's designs for Surya Bonaly in 1992, Wang's designs marked a new trend toward couture in figure skating. Kerrigan's white 1992 free-skating costume resembled a wedding dress with sheer illusion sleeves and a basketweave design on the bodice. Kerrigan's 1994 Olympic dresses were also designed by Wang. She wore another white dress trimmed with black velvet bands and sheer black sleeves for the original program and a champagne-colored dress set with 11,500 rhinestones for the free skate. Wang donated those two dresses to Kerrigan, the values of which were estimated at $9,600 and $13,000, respectively.

== Post-Olympic skating career ==
Kerrigan turned professional after the Olympics. She appeared in a few competitions such as Ice Wars, but focused her career on performing in a variety of ice shows. She has appeared in Champions on Ice, Broadway on Ice, and an ice show adaptation of the musical Footloose, among other productions.

In 2003, Kerrigan became a national spokeswoman for Fight for Sight.

=== Television, movies and video games ===
In the 1994 television movie Tonya and Nancy: The Inside Story, she was portrayed by Heather Langenkamp. Years later, Langenkamp commented: "Good girls always get short shrift in this society, we want the story to be about the bad girl. I can't imagine a more admirable character than Nancy Kerrigan and it's too bad we don't make movies about people like that. People consider good girls boring, unfortunately".

In 1994, Kerrigan hosted Saturday Night Live, season 19 episode 15, featuring musical guest Aretha Franklin. The episode earned the show its highest rating in six years.

In Tattoo Assassins, a Mortal Kombat-style arcade fighting video game developed in 1994 by Data East (the release of which was cancelled, though rare, nearly-complete prototypes are in existence), the figure-skater "Karla Keller", played by Cristine Dupree, which the player can fight as, is heavily based on Kerrigan. Keller's backstory as given in the game itself has her as an Olympic hopeful but in a fictionalized version of the assault on Kerrigan, Keller's rival and fellow figure-skater "Eva Gunter" (a fictional version of Tonya Harding) attacks her late at night and injures her so much that Keller is forced to pull out of the Olympics. Since then, Keller trains in martial arts so she can one day take revenge on Gunter by beating her up. In the game, Karla Keller is dressed in full figure-skater attire (even wearing ice-skates) and like all other fighters in the game, has magical tattoos on her skin (with her motif being roses) that come alive when the player performs special attacks and finishing moves.

In 1995, Kerrigan had a guest appearance on Boy Meets World in the episode "Wrong Side of the Track" where she helps Eric Matthews discover his potential for skating in a dream sequence.

In 2004, Kerrigan sang a cover of "The Best" for a Tina Turner tribute album.

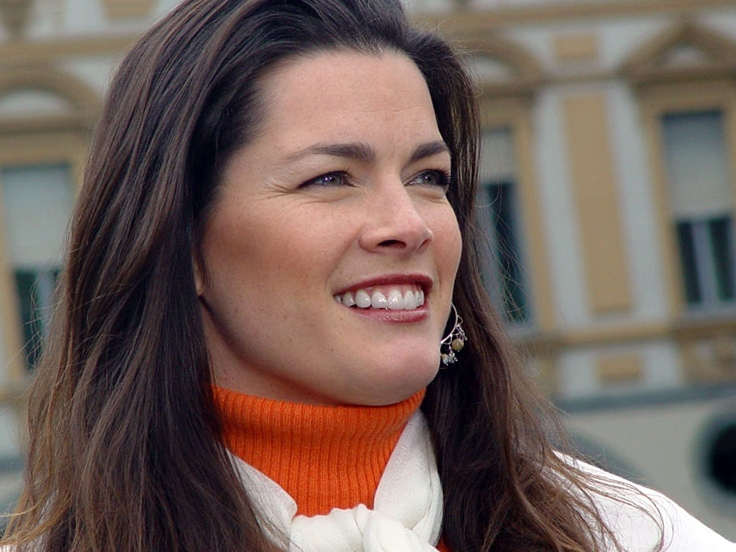
Kerrigan during an interview in 2006

Kerrigan appeared in the Fox television program Skating with Celebrities (2006) and played a small part in the ice-skating comedy feature film Blades of Glory (2007) with Will Ferrell. She hosted Nancy Kerrigan's World of Skating on the Comcast Network starting in 2005, and has done commentary work for other skating broadcasts.

During the 2010 Winter Olympics, Kerrigan served as a "special correspondent" for Entertainment Tonight.

She has written an instructional book on advanced figure-skating technique, Artistry on Ice (ISBN 0-7360-3697-0).

In 2014, ESPN aired The Price of Gold, a 30 for 30 documentary about the 1994 attack. On February 23, 2014, NBC aired a documentary during the 2014 Winter Olympics on the scandal called Nancy & Tonya.

On July 10, 2016, Kerrigan competed against Kayla Harrison on the "Battle of the Olympians" episode of the television program, Flea Market Flip (S7 E2).

In November 2017, she appeared on Keeping Up with the Kardashians in the Christmas special episode.

In December 2017, I, Tonya, a film about Tonya Harding loosely based on actual events, including the attack on Kerrigan, was released; Caitlin Carver played Kerrigan.

In January 2018, Kerrigan joined Inside Edition as their Super Bowl correspondent. She also appeared in an episode of Fresh Off the Boat as herself. In 2021, she played a voice role in the animated Easter movie, Eggs. She appeared in a 2023 Maximum Effort-produced advertising campaign for LinkedIn's business-to-business marketing. The commercial featured her promoting "CRM Cereal" and dancing with the fictional brand's giant panda mascot.

=== Dancing with the Stars ===
Kerrigan was a contestant on Dancing with the Stars for the 24th season, which premiered on March 20, 2017. Her partner was Artem Chigvintsev. They were eliminated in the seventh week of the competition.

Nancy Kerrigan - Dancing with the Stars (season 24)
Week	Dance	Music	Judges' scores (Note: Individual judges' scores are listed in the following order: Carrie Ann Inaba, Len Goodman, Julianne Hough, Bruno Tonioli.)				Total score	Result
1	Viennese waltz	"She's Always a Woman" — Billy Joel	7	7	7	7	28	Safe
2	Cha-cha-cha	"No Rights No Wrongs" — Jess Glynne	7	7	7	7	28	Safe
3	Samba	"Shake Your Bon-Bon" — Ricky Martin	8	9	8	8	33	Safe
4	Foxtrot	"My Wish" — Rascal Flatts	8	9	8	8	33	Safe
5	Jazz	"That's How You Know" — Amy Adams	9	9	9	9	36	Safe
6	Paso doble	"Free Your Mind" — En Vogue	9	8	8	8	33	Safe
6	Team; Freestyle	"My Boyfriend's Back" — The Chiffons "No Scrubs" — TLC "Bo$$" — Fifth Harmony	8	9	8	9	34	Safe
7	Tango	"Oh, Pretty Woman" — Roy Orbison	9	9	9	9	36	Eliminated
7	Cha-cha-cha	"Crave" — Pharrell Williams	Loser (Note: Nancy lost this dance-off to Simone Biles and received no bonus points.)					Eliminated

== Personal life ==
Kerrigan graduated from Stoneham High School and attended Emmanuel College in Boston to study business. Her mother, Brenda, is legally blind, which prompted Kerrigan to create the Nancy Kerrigan Foundation, which aims to raise awareness and support for the vision-impaired.

Kerrigan married her agent Jerry Solomon on September 9, 1995, the year after she retired from competition. The marriage was her first and his third. They have three children together. Solomon also has a son from his second marriage. In April 2017, Kerrigan said that she had six miscarriages in eight years while attempting to have her three children. She said that the miscarriages were "devastating" and "a strain" on the marriage.
