= Caitlin Carver =

American actress (born 1992)

- Born: Monrovia, Alabama, U.S.
- Occupations: Actress, dancer
- Years active: 2012–present

Caitlin Carver is an American actress and dancer best known for her role as Nancy Kerrigan in the biographical sports film I, Tonya (2017).

== Early years ==
Carver was born in Monrovia, Alabama. She attended Sparkman High School in Harvest, Alabama where she graduated in 2010. Her father is Don Carver. She participated in dance, gymnastics, softball, and basketball, until eventually beginning theater in high school. Before her acting career took off, she worked as a professional dancer, dancing with many notable recording artists in the music industry including Beyoncé, Ne-Yo, and Pitbull.

== Career ==
Before acting roles, Carver appeared as a dancer in a number of television series, including Nashville, Glee, Parks and Recreation, and the VH1 cheerleader soapy drama Hit the Floor in the recurring role of Mason. In 2014 she began playing guest parts in Twisted, Southland, and Stalker. Also in 2014, she was cast for the recurring role of Hayley Heinz in the ABC Family drama series The Fosters for two seasons.

While filming The Fosters, Carver was cast as Becca Arrington in the movie adaption of John Green's novel Paper Towns.

In 2015, Carver was cast as Lacey Briggs in the ABC television soap opera Blood & Oil alongside Don Johnson, Amber Valletta, and Scott Michael Foster.

In 2016, Carver was cast as Michelle Geiss, a reluctant beauty and aspiring photographer who is both intellectual and talented, in the ABC television pilot Model Woman. She starred opposite Andie MacDowell, Steven Weber, and Nicole Ari Parker. She was also cast in Warren Beatty's Rules Don't Apply, and made appearances on NCIS, Timeless, and Heroes Reborn.

In 2017, Carver was cast as Nancy Kerrigan alongside Margot Robbie, Allison Janney, and Sebastian Stan in the film I, Tonya.

From 2017–2021, she recurred as Muffy Tuttle on Netflix's Dear White People. From 2022–2023, she recurred as Paramedic Emma Jacobs in NBC's Chicago Fire.

== Filmography ==
=== Film ===
Year	Title	Role	Notes
2012	Crave	Caitlin	Short film
2014	Ballon	Emily	Short film
2015	Impact Earth	Julia Waters	
2015	Paper Towns	Rebecca "Becca" Arrington	
2016	Rules Don't Apply	Marla Lookalike	
2017	I, Tonya	Nancy Kerrigan	
2018	The Matchmaker's Playbook	Blake	
2018	The Delta Girl	Delilah	Short film
2019	Heirloom	Jane	Short film
2022	Diamond in the Rough	Skyler Harrison	
2023	Hayseed	Cassandra	
2023	Night Nurse	Carmen	Short film
TBA	Call of the Void	Moray	Post-production

=== Television ===
Year	Title	Role	Notes
2012	So Random!	Shin Model	Episode: "Shane Harper"
2012–2013	Nashville	Juliette's Dancer	3 episodes
2013	Glee	Vocal Adrenaline member	Episode: "Love, Love, Love"
2013	Parks and Recreation	Chard Girl / Dancing Tooth	2 episodes
2013	Southland	Bloody Girl	Episode: "Hats and Bats"
2013–2014	Hit the Floor	Mason	Recurring role
2014	Twisted	Lizzy	Episode: "The Son Also Falls"
2014–2018	The Fosters	Hayley Heinz	Recurring role
2015	Blood & Oil	Lacey Briggs	Unaired pilot
2015	From the Top	Clarissa McMillan	Television film
2015	Heroes Reborn	Young Erica	Episode: "Company Woman"
2015	Stalker	Alexis	Episode: "Lost and Found"
2016	NCIS	Megan Porter	Episode: "React"
2016	Timeless	Maria Tompkins	Episode: "Space Race"
2017	Freakish	Elise	Episode: "Humanity"
2017	The Rachels	Rachel Richards	Television film
2017–2021	Dear White People	Muffy Tuttle	Recurring role
2018	S.W.A.T.	Juliette Carlton	Episode: "Payback"
2022	The Rookie	Melanie	Episode: "Double Down"
2022–2023	Chicago Fire	Emma Jacobs	Recurring role
2025	Countdown		Episode: "Run" "Your People are in Danger"
