= Broadway on Ice =

Ice show

Broadway On Ice is a long-running ice show produced by Willy Bietak Productions. Dating back to the early 1980s, in recent years the show has been presented in theatrical venues in resort areas such as Las Vegas and Branson, Missouri with a rotating cast of skating and musical guest stars, rather than as a touring ice show. The format of the show is a revue using music from popular Broadway theatre shows.

Skaters who have been featured in the show include Nancy Kerrigan, Dorothy Hamill, Brian Boitano, Oksana Baiul, and Rudy Galindo. Musical guest stars have included Davis Gaines, Deborah Gibson, and Leslie Uggams, Franc D'Ambrosio.
