= Ford's Chapel United Methodist Church =

United Methodist Church in Harvest, Alabama

Coordinates: 34.8412°N 86.7305539°W

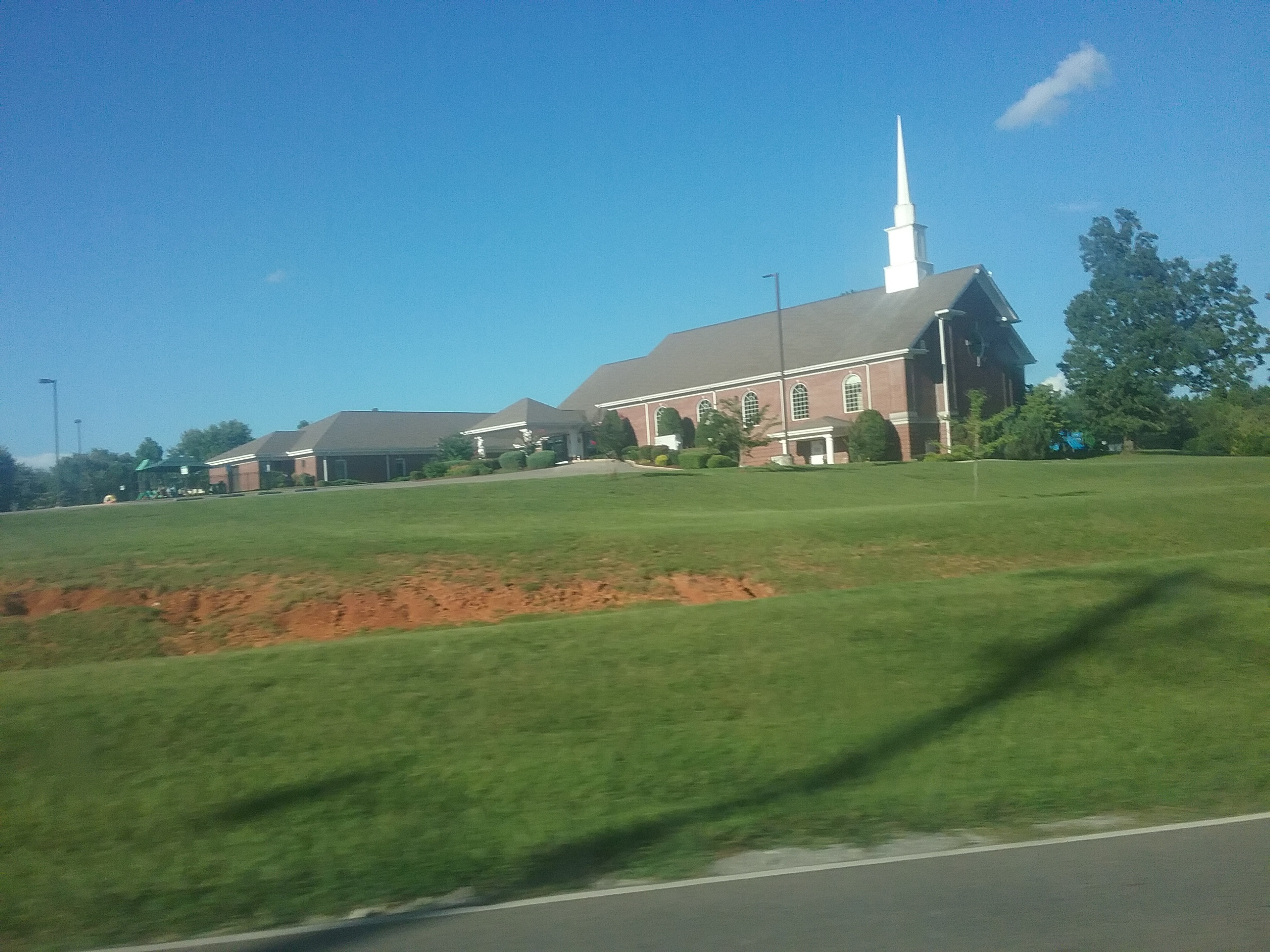
Ford's Chapel United Methodist Church in 2022

Ford's Chapel United Methodist Church, or simply Ford's Chapel UMC, is a United Methodist church located in Harvest, Alabama, in the United States. It was founded in 1808 and is the first Methodist Church established in what is now the state of Alabama.

== History ==
Three years after the close of the Revolutionary War, in 1784, the first Methodist Conference in America was organized under the direction of John Wesley of England who appointed Thomas Coke and Francis Asbury as Bishops.

=== 1802–1808 ===
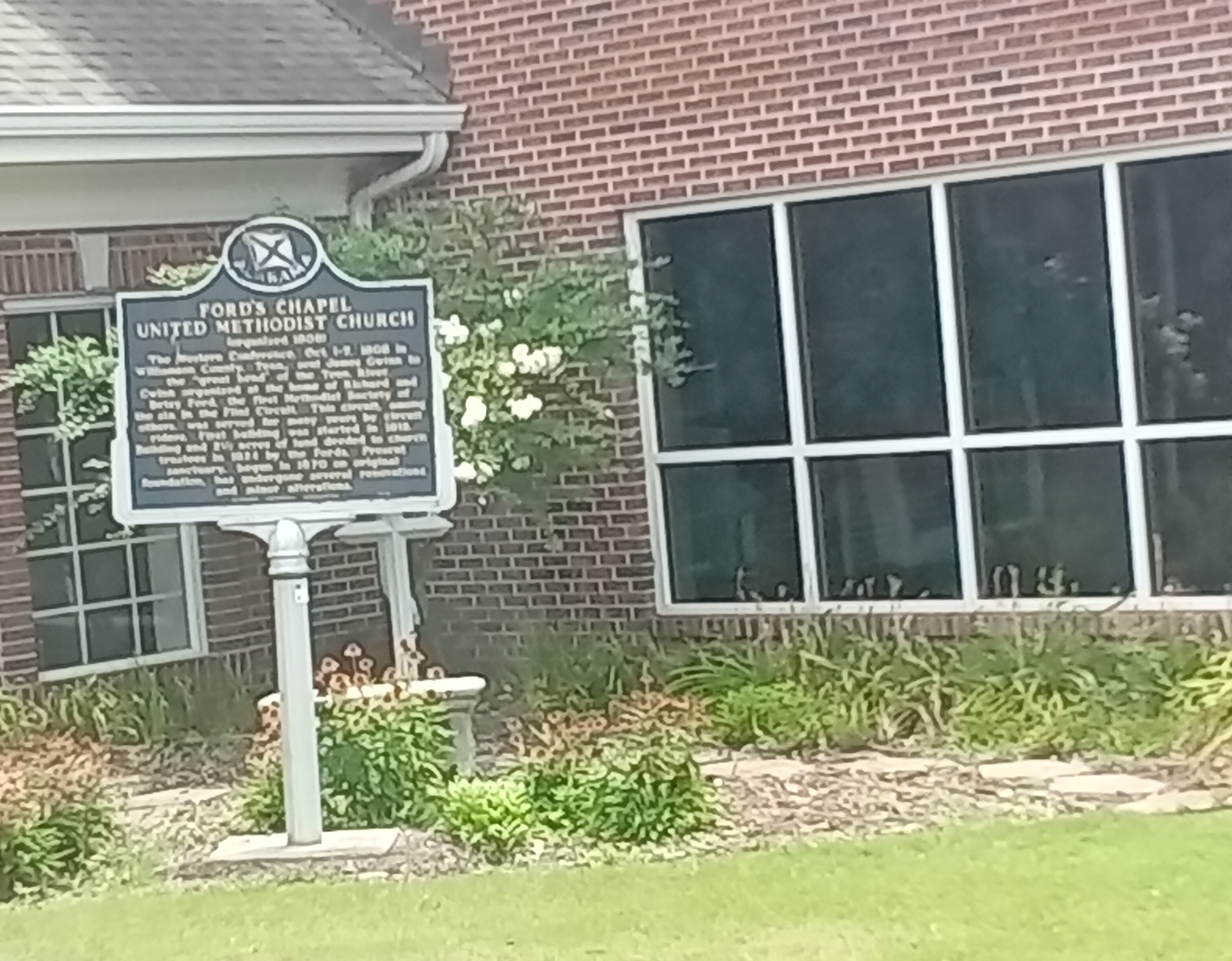
Landmark plaque (pictured in 2022).

By 1802, settlers had left the original thirteen states and scattered across the land to the Mississippi River and possibly beyond. Until the 1808–1812 Indian War, North Alabama was the home of the Choctaw, Chickasaw, Cherokee and Creek Indians. The treaty ending the war in 1812 decreed that the Indians should be moved west of the Mississippi. Indian relics and General Andrew Jackson battlefields are located in this area, called in that period, "The Big Bend Country" of the Tennessee River. During the war years the white families were moving down from Tennessee. John Hunt and his party came in 1805.

In 1802, Bishop Francis Asbury had changed the location and the number of Methodist Conferences. He established a new Conference called the Western Conference to serve Kentucky, Tennessee, and Alabama north of the Tennessee River. He traveled by carriage from North Carolina to Nashville in October 1802 to hold his first church Conference. He created his charges, assigned his preachers, and ordained a group of young men to become ministers after a period of training.

At the Conference of 1802, James Gwinn was a member of the training class, and was given the title Methodist Missionary Circuit Rider.

On October 1–7, 1808 a very important Western Conference met at Liberty Hill, Williamson County, Tennessee. Mr. Green Hill, a well-to-do planter and a devout Methodist asked them to use part of his land as a campground for the Conference. It is mentioned in Annon West's, D.D. History of Methodism that over a thousand people met for the church work there and for revival services. This Conference was important to Ford's Chapel, because the missionary James Gwinn was sent to the "Big Bend Area" in October 1808.

Therefore, these two and one-half acres - more or less - have been a sacred spot since October 1808.

The Rev. Gwinn in 1808 called his area the Flint Circuit. It started on the Northeast at McMinnville, Tennessee and extended Southwest to what is Hobbs Island in the Tennessee River. He came to this area in October and immediately started organizing Methodist societies, six in all. Ford's Chapel (his first stop because it was a day's horseback ride from his home), State Line, Blue Springs, Jordan's Camp Ground, Hunt's Spring (now Huntsville First Methodist) and Lebanon (now Latham Memorial, Farley). The records only mention four or five months of work on the circuit. It is accepted as a fact that Richard and Betsy Ford became good friends of Rev. Gwinn and that their home just west of this spot became a Methodist Society meeting place, and that he used it as headquarters when he came from Nashville to his circuit. The records show that he had a wife and young family in Nashville, which may explain his short working time of four or five months.

=== 1809–1900 ===
At the Western Conference in October 1809, the Rev. Gwinn reported 175 White and 4 Black converts.

From 1803 until 1819, North Alabama was part of the Mississippi Territory. In the years 1809–1810, Tennessee and Mississippi Territory had a Federal Land-Grant office established in Nashville, Tennessee. Settlers from this area would be allowed to establish the boundaries of the land they were "squatting" on for about three dollars an acre. It is recorded in the Madison County Courthouse, Huntsville, AL that Richard Ford went to Nashville in June 1810 and bought his land.

It is accepted as being true that the Fords allowed these two and one-half acres to be used as a summer campground for the Methodist. It is also believed that several Bush-Arbors were built and used for summer revivals.

By 1815 there was an established Methodist congregation large and strong enough to start a church building, which was completed by 1819 at this place.

In 1824, Richard and Betsy Ford deeded the land and church to Ford's Chapel Church Trustees, making it legal Methodist property. The trustees: Robert Hancock, Clem Hancock, Gabriael Hancock, Thomas Wilson, Cloudberry Greenhaw, and James Sanderson, signed and accepted the deed. For some reason the Trustees waited until 1826 to have the deed recorded in the Madison County Courthouse Book K, Pages 419-420 Deed Book.

Mr. James Sanderson, one of the first trustees, and his descendants have served this church well over all the years with always a Sanderson name on the church roll.

In 1820–21, the Rev. Hartwell Brown was stationed on the Flint Circuit. Several of his daughters married local men and some of his descendants have been on the church roll continually to the present time.

Ford's Chapel went into the Tennessee Conference in 1812.

In 1870, the North Alabama Conference was established and Ford's Chapel left the Tennessee Conference and became a member of the North Alabama Conference.

At different times, the North Alabama Conference placed Ford's Chapel on the Meridianville, the Madison, and the Toney Circuits. Today we are the Ford's Chapel Church. In 1870, the original building was deteriorating. The members razed the old building. However, when they reached the floor joists they stopped - for here they found fourteen-inch hand-hewn Oak timbers. This building is resting on the joists of the first building. The new building was a white clapboard church and under the very ancient and stately Oaks, looked beautiful.

During some of the latter years of the 19th Century, this building was used as both a church and a school. Throughout the years at revival time, the Church and its grounds frequently have been filled.

Three ministers went into the Methodist Ministry as members of Ford's Chapel: William H. Pettus, Carl Stovall, and Darby Mason.

Robert Paine was stationed here, 1819–1820, and later became President of Lagrange College and finally for sixteen years was a bishop of the various conferences. Ford's Chapel had two other members who preached here their first year who have served the North Alabama Conference - E. Hobson Clarke in Education and Thelmer Vaughn in Finances. In fact, being a poor, small country church we received many young ministers - and we helped train them in the way they should go. Most of the time they were students from Athens College. Athens College was, at that time, a Methodist School and was less than twenty miles away.

=== 1900–present ===
In 1918 a choir bay was built where the Sunday school rooms in the front of the Church are now. At that time the back of the church was what is now the front.

From 1963–1976 many structural changes took place at Ford's Chapel. The seating arrangement was reversed (making the front of the church as it appears today), the old choir bay was torn down and Sunday School rooms were added in the front, the annex was built (as a separate building and was not bricked), the sanctuary was bricked and the steeple was added with a bell installed in it.

Also during the 1970s and 1980s, the inside walls of the building have been covered, carpet has been installed, a cooling and heating system has been installed, new pews have been installed, new lights have been installed and stained glass has replaced the old glass in the windows and even a new door has been placed at the entrance to the church. Indeed, the only visible part of the 1870 church is that the windows are in the same place and are the same size.

In 2004, the congregation celebrated the opening of the new sanctuary and classrooms.

On April 27, 2011, a tornado reached Harvest and destroyed the church's historic chapel, as well as its Family Life Center and steeple.
