= Davis Gaines =

American actor and singer

- Born: January 21, 1954 (age 71); Orlando, Florida, U.S.
- Occupation(s): Singer, actor
- Years active: 1979-present
- Known for: The Phantom of the Opera

Davis Gaines (born January 21, 1954, Orlando, Florida) is an American stage actor and baritone. He has performed as The Phantom in the Andrew Lloyd Webber musical The Phantom of the Opera over 2,000 times, on Broadway, on tour, in Los Angeles, and in San Francisco. (He had previously played Raoul in the Broadway production.) He won the Bay Area Critics' Award for Best Actor. He performed the role for a Phantom segment for the Kennedy Center Honors in 1994.

He originated the lead role of The Man in Whistle Down the Wind (1996). Gaines was also the singing voice of Chamberlain in The Swan Princess (1994). He guested in "Murder in White", a 1993 episode of Murder, She Wrote. He was also a musical guest star for Broadway on Ice, a touring ice show with live music. Gaines played the role of Anthony Hope in Sondheim's Sweeney Todd: The Demon Barber of Fleet Street in concert, alongside George Hearn as Todd, Patti LuPone as Lovett, Timothy Nolen as Turpin, and Neil Patrick Harris as Tobias. He has since reprised the role of Anthony in numerous productions. He also played the Old Confederate Soldier and Judge Roan in Parade at the Lincoln Center in 2015.

He's also known for his performances in regional productions of Les Misérables, Parade, Damn Yankees, and Hello, Dolly!. He received an Ovation Award for his performance in the role of Don Quixote / Miguel de Cervantes in Man of La Mancha. He was also in the original Off-Broadway production of Stephen Sondheim’s Assassins as an understudy for the roles of the Balladeer and Charles Guiteau. In 2000, he was in a concert version of The Frogs opposite Nathan Lane and Brian Stokes Mitchell at the Library of Congress.

One of his first jobs was as a costumed character at Walt Disney World theme park; as a high school student, he played Pinocchio character J. Worthington Foulfellow.

== Stage credits ==
Year	Title	Role	Location	Notes
1979	The Best Little Whorehouse in Texas	Cowboy / Dogette / Aggie / Photographer / Governor's Aide	-	US National Tour
1980	Camelot	Sir Lionel's Squire / Ensemble	New York State Theatre	Broadway
1981	Camelot	Sir Lionel's Squire	-	US National Tour
1981	Camelot	Sir Sagramore's Squire	-	US National Tour
1982	The Death of von Richthofen as Witnessed from Earth	Member of The Flying Circus u/s R. Raymond-Barker	The Public Theater	Off-Broadway
1983	Hello, Dolly!	Cornelius Hackl	-	US National Tour
1984	Joseph and the Amazing Technicolor Dreamcoat	Joseph	Paper Mill Playhouse	
1984	Joseph and the Amazing Technicolor Dreamcoat	Joseph	Westport Country Playhouse	
1985	Guys and Dolls	Sky Masterson	Seattle Repertory Theatre	
1985	Cabaret	Clifford Bradshaw	Darien Dinner Theatre	
1986	Hello, Dolly!	Cornelius Hackl	Heinz Hall	
1986	Camelot	Sir Lancelot du Lac	Garde Arts Center	
1986	The New Moon	Robert Mission	New York City Opera	Alternate
1986	Damn Yankees	Joe Hardy	Paper Mill Playhouse	
1988	Damn Yankees	Joe Hardy	Royal Alexandra Theatre	
1988	Arsenic and Old Lace	Mortimer Brewster	Hart House Theatre	
1989	Company	Robert	Birmingham Theatre	
1989	She Loves Me	Steven Kodaly	Lillie Blake School	
1989	Show Boat	Gaylord Ravenal	Minnesota Opera	
1989	West Side Story	Tony	North Shore Music Theatre	
1990	Carousel	Billy Bigelow	North Shore Music Theatre	
1990	The Phantom of the Opera	Raoul, Vicomte de Chagny	Majestic Theatre	Broadway
1990-1991	Assassins	u/s The Balladeer u/s Charles Guiteau	Playwrights Horizons	Off-Broadway
1991-1994	The Phantom of the Opera	The Phantom of the Opera	-	US National Tour
1994-1996	The Phantom of the Opera	The Phantom of the Opera	Majestic Theatre	Broadway
1995	Pippin	Pippin	Majestic Theatre	Broadway
1996-1997	Whistle Down the Wind	The Man	National Theatre	
1997	The Boys from Syracuse	Antipholus of Syracuse	New York City Center	Off-Broadway; Encores!
1998	The Phantom of the Opera	The Phantom of the Opera	-	US National Tour
1999	Sweeney Todd: The Demon Barber of Fleet Street	Anthony Hope	Ahmanson Theatre	Concert
2000	Sweeney Todd: The Demon Barber of Fleet Street	Anthony Hope	Royal Festival Hall, Southbank Centre	Concert
2000	Sweeney Todd: The Demon Barber of Fleet Street	Anthony Hope	Avery Fisher Hall, Lincoln Center	The New York Philharmonic
2000	The Frogs	William Shakespeare	The Library of Congress	Concert
2001	Sweeney Todd: The Demon Barber of Fleet Street	Anthony Hope	San Francisco War Memorial and Performing Arts Center	Concert
2001	Sweeney Todd: The Demon Barber of Fleet Street	Anthony Hope	Ravinia Festival	Concert
2009	Sweeney Todd: The Demon Barber of Fleet Street	Sweeney Todd	Bob Carr Theater	Concert
2009	Parade	Old Confederate Soldier / Judge Leonard Roan	Mark Taper Forum	
2010	1776	Richard Henry Lee	Carpenter Performing Arts Center	
2011	Camelot	King Arthur	Wells Fargo Pavilion	
2012	Man of La Mancha	Don Quixote / Miguel de Cervantes	Carpenter Performing Arts Center	Won an Ovation Award
2012	Monty Python's Spamalot	King Arthur	Carpenter Performing Arts Center	
2012	Silence! The Musical	Dr. Hannibal Lecter	Hayworth Theatre	
2013	Mack and Mabel	Mack	Carpenter Performing Arts Center	
2013	I Do! I Do!	Michael	Laguna Playhouse	
2014	The Music Man	Professor Harold Hill	Carpenter Performing Arts Center	
2014	Les Misérables	Inspector Javert	Orlando Shakespeare Theater	
2015	Parade	Old Confederate Soldier / Judge Leonard Roan	Avery Fisher Hall, Lincoln Center	Concert
2015	Les Misérables	Inspector Javert	Carpenter Performing Arts Center	
2016	Dirty Rotten Scoundrels	Lawrence Jameson	Carpenter Performing Arts Center	
2016	Lend Me a Tenor	Tito Merelli	La Mirada Theatre for the Performing Arts	
2017	Evita	Juan Perón	Carpenter Performing Arts Center	
2017	Newsies	Joseph Pulitzer	The Muny	
2018	Parade	Hugh Dorsey	Cerritos Center for the Performing Arts	
2019	Oliver!	Fagin	Carpenter Performing Arts Center	
2019	Something Rotten!	Nostradamus	Carpenter Performing Arts Center	
2022	The Fantasticks	El Gallo	Orlando Shakespeare Theater	

== Filmography ==
=== Film ===
Year	Title	Role	Notes
1993	Warlock: The Armageddon	Nathan Sinclair	
1994	The Swan Princess	Sir Chamberlain (singing voice)	Voice
1998	Cab to Canada	Maitre D'	TV movie
1998	The Swan Princess: Sing Along	Sir Chamberlain	Short; Voice
2001	Sweeney Todd: The Demon Barber of Fleet Street in Concert	Anthony Hope	TV movie

=== Television ===
Year	Title	Role	Notes
1992	The Bold and the Beautiful	Stuart Maxwell	2 episodes
1993	Bodies of Evidence	Peter Marx	2 episodes
1993	Murder, She Wrote	Peter Drew	1 episode
1995	Guiding Light	Doctor	1 episode
1998	Chicago Hope	Rolf Cabot	1 episode
2005	Charmed	Walter Nance	1 episode
2009	Desperate Housewives	Accountant	1 episode

== Awards and nominations ==
Ovation Awards

- 2012: Won the award for Lead Actor in a Musical for his role as Cervantes/Quixote in the Musical Theatre West production of Man of La Mancha
