= Harvest, Alabama =

- Census-designated place
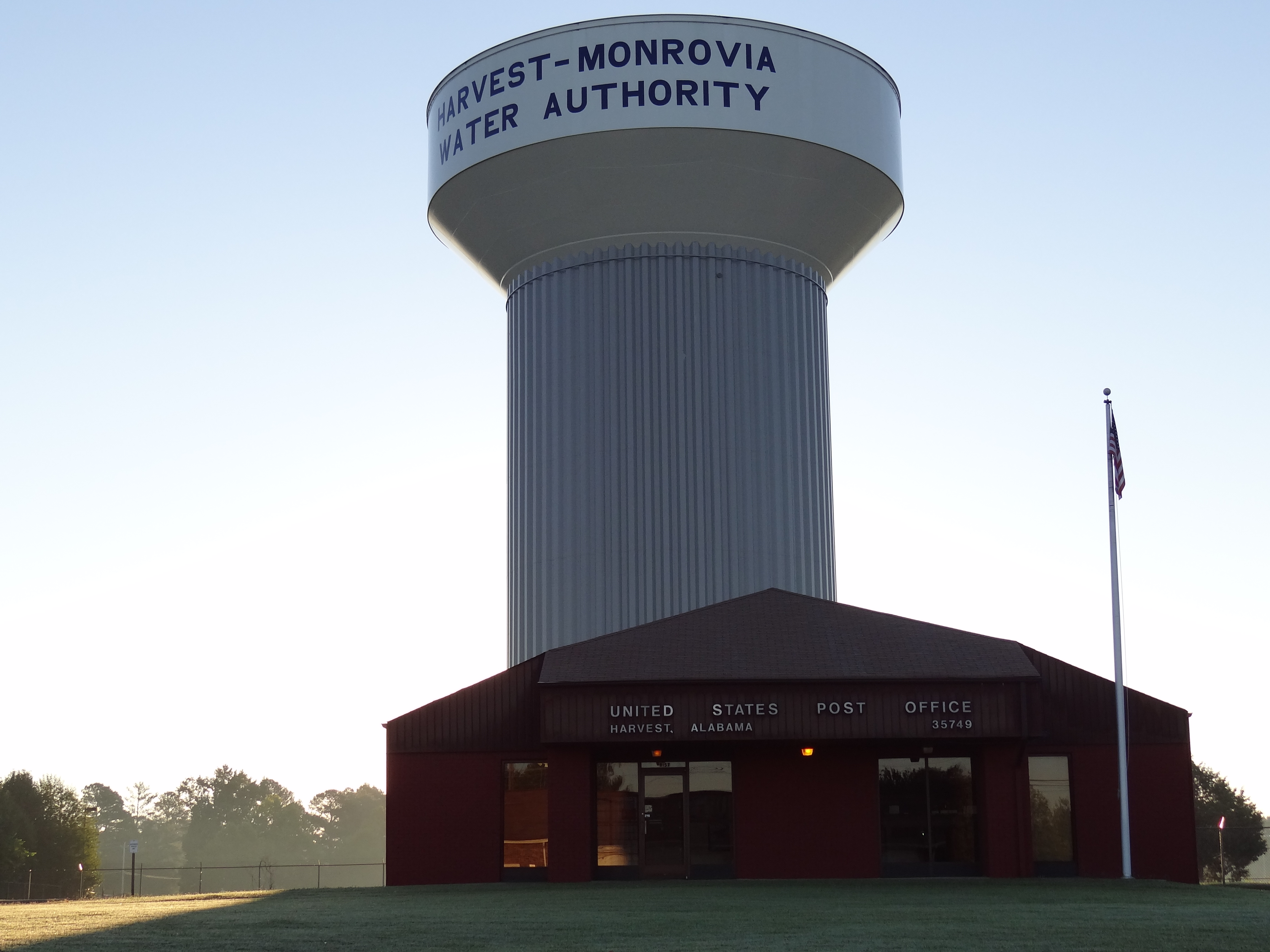
- Post office and water tower in Harvest

- Location in Madison County, Alabama
- Coordinates: 34°51′10″N 86°44′52″W
- Country: United States
- State: Alabama
- County: Madison

Area
  - Total: 12.40 sq mi (32.11 km^{2})
  - Land: 12.33 sq mi (31.94 km^{2})
  - Water: 0.062 sq mi (0.16 km^{2})
- Elevation: 820 ft (250 m)

Population (2020)
  - Total: 5,893
  - Density: 477.8/sq mi (184.49/km^{2})
- Time zone: UTC-6 (Central (CST))
  - Summer (DST): UTC-5 (CDT)
- ZIP code: 35749
- Area code: 256
- FIPS code: 01-33472
- GNIS feature ID: 2402570

Harvest is an unincorporated community and census-designated place (CDP) in the northwestern part of Madison County, Alabama, United States, and is included in the Huntsville-Decatur Combined Statistical Area. As of the 2020 census, Harvest had a population of 5,893.

== History ==
The Harvest area was originally part of Cherokee lands until the early 1800s. From the late 1800s through the early 1900s, Harvest saw growth and development resulting from the construction and operation of a rail line southward from Fayetteville, Tennessee. The Nashville, Chattanooga & St. Louis (NC&StL) Railway eventually acquired the rail line. In the early-to-mid-1900s, Harvest was centered around the railroad between the communities of Capshaw (the line's terminus) and Toney. Many early settlers in the Harvest area were from the Fayetteville area. In 1929, the NC&StL abandoned the line, pulled up the rails and transferred the right-of-way to the Madison County Highway Department with a quitclaim deed. Today, that roadbed is a two-lane roadway that continues to serve as a vital link in the modern day-to-day transportation network, and carries the appropriate name, “Old Railroad Bed Road.”

On April 3, 1974, during the 1974 Super Outbreak, two F5 tornadoes struck the community within 30 minutes of each other. Most of Harvest, primarily along the Old Railroad Bed Road area, and other nearby communities, including Tanner, was destroyed. Fifty people were killed by the tornadoes.

Harvest was hit by another violent tornado on May 18, 1995, that devastated the Anderson Hills subdivision. This F4 tornado killed one person.

On April 27, 2011, during the 2011 Super Outbreak, Harvest suffered significant damage from the EF5 tornado that destroyed the towns of Hackleburg and Phil Campbell, primarily north of Nick Davis Road, situated between Old Railroad Bed Road and Wall Triana Highway. The Anderson Hills subdivision was once again devastated, and damage in Harvest was rated EF4. The tornado killed 72 people along its path.

On March 2, 2012, during the tornado outbreak of March 2–3, 2012, Harvest suffered yet another direct hit from a damaging tornado, this one rated EF3. It hit the same area as the April 27, 2011, tornado, though no fatalities occurred this time. Some of the houses being rebuilt from the previous outbreak were destroyed again.

== Geography ==
According to the U.S. Census Bureau, the community has a total area of 12.4 square miles (32 km^{2}), all land.

Capshaw Mountain (1,250 feet above sea level) is the only notable geological feature in the area, which extends about 800 feet above the general elevation in the area. The top of this small mountain is the site of several substantial communications towers used by local radio stations. Capshaw Mountain forms a watershed that provides the water supply for the community.

== Demographics ==
Historical population
Census	Pop.	Note	%±
1990	1,922		—
2000	3,054		58.9%
2010	5,281		72.9%
2020	5,893		11.6%
2024 (est.)	6,934	▲	17.7%
U.S. Decennial Census

Harvest first appeared as a census designated place in the 1990 U.S. Census. The population was estimated to be 6,934 in 2024.

=== Racial and ethnic composition ===
Harvest CDP, Alabama – Racial and ethnic composition Note: the US Census treats Hispanic/Latino as an ethnic category. This table excludes Latinos from the racial categories and assigns them to a separate category. Hispanics/Latinos may be of any race. Race and ethnicity were not reported in Alabama for populations under 2,500 in 1980 and under 1,000 in 1990.
Race / Ethnicity (NH = Non-Hispanic)	Pop 1990	Pop 2000	Pop 2010	Pop 2020	% 1990	% 2000	% 2010	% 2020
White alone (NH)	1,588	2,317	3,198	3,083	82.62%	75.87%	60.56%	52.32%
Black or African American alone (NH)	249	573	1,671	1,916	12.96%	18.76%	31.64%	32.51%
Native American or Alaska Native alone (NH)	50	38	28	25	2.60%	1.24%	0.53%	0.42%
Asian alone (NH)	11	34	63	64	0.57%	1.11%	1.19%	1.09%
Native Hawaiian or Pacific Islander alone (NH)	x	0	3	4	x	0.00%	0.06%	0.07%
Other race alone (NH)	0	0	7	42	0.00%	0.00%	0.13%	0.71%
Mixed race or Multiracial (NH)	x	62	148	391	x	2.03%	2.80%	6.63%
Hispanic or Latino (any race)	24	30	163	368	1.25%	0.98%	3.09%	6.24%
Total	1,922	3,054	5,281	5,893	100.00%	100.00%	100.00%	100.00%

=== 2020 census ===
As of the 2020 census, Harvest had a population of 5,893. The median age was 37.9 years. 24.8% of residents were under the age of 18 and 12.6% of residents were 65 years of age or older. For every 100 females there were 94.5 males, and for every 100 females age 18 and over there were 88.5 males age 18 and over.

80.2% of residents lived in urban areas, while 19.8% lived in rural areas.

There were 2,155 households in Harvest, including 1,642 families, and 36.9% had children under the age of 18 living in them. Of all households, 58.0% were married-couple households, 14.6% were households with a male householder and no spouse or partner present, and 23.4% were households with a female householder and no spouse or partner present. About 20.1% of all households were made up of individuals and 6.9% had someone living alone who was 65 years of age or older.

There were 2,263 housing units, of which 4.8% were vacant. The homeowner vacancy rate was 1.2% and the rental vacancy rate was 6.4%.

=== 2010 census ===
The 2010 census lists 5,281 people, 1,882 households, and 1,512 families living in the community. The population density was 246.3 inhabitants per square mile (95.1/km^{2}). There were 1,976 housing units at an average density of 159.4 per square mile (61.5/km^{2}). The racial makeup of the community was 62.2% white, 31.7% Black or African American, 0.5% Native American, 1.2% Asian, 1.1% other races, and 3.2% listing two or more races. Slightly more than three percent (3.1%) of the population were Hispanic or Latino of any race. Of the 1,882 households, 38.9% had children under age 18 living with them, 62.8% were married couples living together, 12.6% had a female householder with no husband present, and 19.7% were non-families. 16.4% of households were one person, and 4.3% were one person age 65 or older. The average household size was 2.81, and the average family size was 3.15.

The age distribution was 28.1% under age 18, 7.7% ages 18 to 24, 28.6% ages 25 to 44, 26.5% ages 45 to 64, and 9.2% ages 65 and older. The median age was 35.2. For every 100 females, there were 99.1 males. For every 100 females ages 18 and older, there were 94.1 males.

The median household income was $67,468, and the median family income was $70,536. Males had a median income of $48,995 versus $35,978 for females. The per capita income for the community was $28,619. About 1.2% of families and 3.7% of the population were below the poverty line, including 4.0% of those under age 18, and 2.7% of those ages 65 and older.

=== 2000 census ===
The 2000 census lists 3,054 people, 1,092 households, and 898 families living in the community. The population density was 245.8 inhabitants per square mile (94.9/km^{2}). There were 1,146 housing units at an average density of 92.2 per square mile (35.6/km^{2}). The racial makeup of the community was 76.56% white, 18.76% Black or African American, 1.28% Native American, 1.11% Asian, 0.20% other races, and 2.10% listing two or more races. Slightly less than one percent (0.98%) of the population was Hispanic or Latino of any race. Of the 1,092 households, 39.9% had children under age 18 living with them, 72.5% were married couples living together, 7.1% had a female householder with no husband present, and 17.7% were non-families. 15.8% of households were one person, while 5.0% were one person age 65 or older. The average household size was 2.8 and the average family size was 3.13.

The age distribution was 28.6% under age 18, 5.6% ages 18 to 24, 34.3% ages 25 to 44, 23.6% ages 45 to 64, and 8.0% 65 and older. The median age was 36. For every 100 females, there were 102.8 males. For every 100 females age 18 and older, there were 97.5 males.

The median household income was $61,319, and the median family income was $64,519. Males had a median income of $46,813 versus $30,114 for females. The per capita income for the community was $23,322. About 6.8% of families and 8.0% of the population were below the poverty line, including 7.2% of those under age 18, and 4.2% of those ages 65 and over.

== Public services ==
The community is served by the Harvest-Monrovia Water and Sewer Authority. The water system maintains several large storage tanks and has a new water treatment facility.

The Madison County Sheriff's Department serves Harvest.

The Harvest Volunteer Fire Department consists of approximately 40 members serving the residents of West Central Madison County. The fire department has three stations that house five engines, along with other assorted rescue vehicles. Harvest is assisted by the Toney Volunteer Fire Department to the north, and Monrovia Volunteer Fire/Rescue to the south.

== Education ==
The Madison County School System, the area school district, operates several schools in Harvest. Sparkman High School has a 2021 enrollment of 1,777 students in grades 10–12. Sparkman Ninth Grade School was constructed in 2007 across the street from Sparkman High. Combined, the two schools constitute one of the larger high schools in North Alabama. Middle school students in Harvest are zoned for either Monrovia Middle in the Monrovia community, or Sparkman Middle in Toney. There are also four elementary schools in Harvest/Monrovia: Harvest, Monrovia, Endeavor, and Legacy.

The Huntsville Madison County Public Library maintains a branch, the Monrovia Public Library, in the Monrovia Community Center on Allen Drake Drive near Phillips Park. This branch library is part of a well-supported community library system in Madison County.

== Economy ==
The economy of Harvest depends a great deal on residential construction. In 2003, more than 650 new homes were built in Harvest and the adjacent Monrovia community. In addition, it is home to numerous small- and medium-sized businesses. Most residents work in the cities of Madison and Huntsville.

Retail trade is rapidly expanding with the construction of new retail stores and restaurants which coincide with continuing residential growth. The area's businesses serve a wide area, encompassing much of northwest Madison County and adjacent northeast Limestone County.

The 2021 opening of a $2.3 billion Mazda and Toyota manufacturing plant in Huntsville, Alabama created approximately 4,000 jobs in the area.

== Notable people ==
- Bruce Maxwell, Catcher for Oakland As
- Steve Raby, 2010 Democratic nominee for U.S. Representative for Alabama's 5th congressional district

== See also ==
- Capshaw Mountain
- Ford's Chapel United Methodist Church
