= Huntsville-Madison County Public Library =

Public library in Huntsville, Alabama, US

The Huntsville-Madison Public Library System gives people a peek into the rich history of Huntsville, Alabama. The library system has a Special Collections Department where archivists and librarians alike provide assistance for patrons who need help with research. Mattie Darwin was a librarian in the beginning of the 20th century who started gathering texts, documents and other items of antiquity for the community to view. The official archive was created in the year 1976. The archive contained many rare items such as town records, rare books, diaries, photographs and so much more. Many of these items were the items collected by Mattie in the early 1800s.

The downtown library branch in Madison County was developed in 1986. There a special area called the Heritage Room was the place were the archives were housed. These items focused on the historical events and times Madison County and the entire state of Alabama. Besides the physical historical items, the library system developed the digital archives. This is the online version of the many artifacts and items on the county and state's history. These are available to the public. The special collections department is open to citizens providing historical documents and other items to become possible additions to the archives. If the item qualifies or chosen by the archivist, they can either take the physical copy or digitize the item for the online archive.

== Huntsville-Madison County Library Archive ==
Huntsville-Madison County Public Library
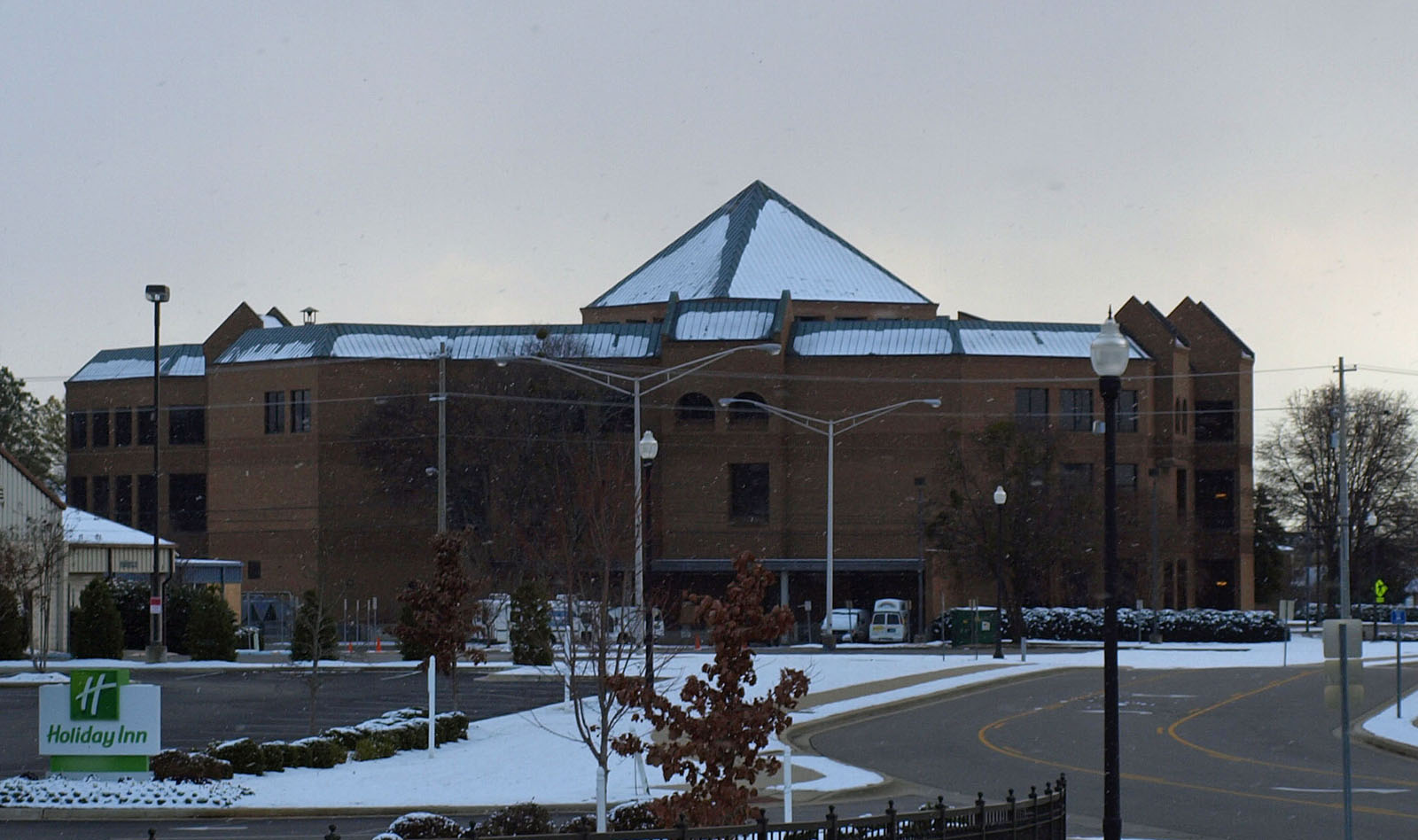
- The main branch in Huntsville in December 2010
- 34.7227°N 86.5895°W
- Location: Huntsville & Madison County, Alabama
- Established: 1818
- Branches: 12

Collection
- Size: 530,000

Access and use
- Circulation: 1,915,548 (2007)

Other information
- Website: http://hmcpl.org/

The Huntsville-Madison County Public Library is a public, Carnegie library in Huntsville, Alabama. Founded in 1818, when Alabama was still a part of the Mississippi Territory, it is often described as the oldest continuing library in the state, however it does not have an unbroken lineage, as the institution dissolved in the 1830's and the Hermathenian Library Company took its place. Further, during the Civil War books were scattered into private homes and it was not until March 1, 1870 that a new library association would form, the Huntsville Literary Debating Association.

It was first located in the office of attorney John Nelson Spotswood Jones, in the Boardman Building, which is now a part of Constitution Hall Park. The Library also occupied space in the Green Academy from 1821 until Union soldiers burned the school during the Civil War, and moved to borrowed spaces several times until the Carnegie Library opened in 1916. It was designed by Huntsville architect and preservationist Edgar Lee Love. A new building was constructed to accommodate city and county growth, and opened in 1966. The area enjoyed rapid growth with the influx of government employees involved in the development of the space program, including the United States Army and NASA, and the library eventually needed more space as early as 1969. Library officials began planning for a new building in 1983.

The current facility's main branch, sometimes referred to as "Fort Book" for its fortress-like appearance, opened on Monroe Street in April 1987 and serves as the headquarters for the Huntsville Madison County Public Library System. The building contains 123,000 square feet (11,400 m^{2}), has a seating capacity of 930 and contains over 530,000 volumes, with administrative offices located on the third floor. The library had a circulation of 1,915,548 in 2007, making it the highest-circulating library in Alabama.

The Huntsville-Madison County Public Library received a federal grant from the Library Services and Technology Act in 2004 specifically to digitize photographs from the Library's Archives for inclusion in the Alabama Mosaic Project.

Huntsville-Madison County Library Archive

The Huntsville-Madison Public Library System gives people a peek into the rich history of Huntsville, Alabama. The library system has a Special Collections Department where archivists and librarians alike provide assistance for patrons who need help with research. Mattie Darwin was a librarian in the beginning of the 20th century who started gathering texts, documents and other items of antiquity for the community to view. The official archive was created in the year 1976. The archive contained many rare items such as town records, rare books, diaries, photographs and so much more. Many of these items were the items collected by Mattie in the early 1800s.

The downtown library branch in Madison County was developed in 1986. There a special area called the Heritage Room was the place were the archives were housed. These items focused on the historical events and times Madison County and the entire state of Alabama. Besides the physical historical items, the library system developed the digital archives. This is the online version of the many artifacts and items on the county and state's history. These are available to the public. The special collections department is open to citizens providing historical documents and other items to become possible additions to the archives. If the item qualifies or chosen by the archivist, they can either take the physical copy or digitize the item for the online archive.

== Locations ==
HMCPL systems owns and operates the Downtown Huntsville Public Library, and 10 branch libraries throughout Madison County:

Branch	Location
Cavalry Hill Public Library	Huntsville
Downtown Huntsville Public Library	Huntsville
Gurley Public Library	Gurley
Madison Public Library	Madison
Monrovia Public Library	Monrovia
New Hope Public Library	New Hope
North Huntsville Public Library	Huntsville
South Huntsville Public Library	Huntsville
Tillman Hill Public Library	Hazel Green
Triana Public Library	Triana

The Triana branch has a new building after the original was destroyed by fire in late 2009. The new building opened in the spring of 2014, adjacent to the old location. The Bailey Cove branch was combined with the Eleanor Murphy Branch to create a new South Huntsville Public Library in 2021. The Bessie K. Russell and Shower Branch Libraries were combined to form the North Huntsville Public Library in 2021. The New Hope Public Library relocated in 2022 to a new building on Main Drive in New Hope.
