= Capshaw Mountain =

Mountain in Alabama, United States

- Location within Alabama

Highest point
- Elevation: 1,250 ft (380 m)
- Listing: List of mountains of the United States
- Coordinates: 34°49′08″N 86°44′17″W

Geography
- Location: Madison County, Alabama, US
- Topo map: USGS Jeff

Capshaw Mountain is a mountain located in Harvest, Alabama. Capshaw Mountain forms a watershed that provides the water supply for the community. It extends upwards about 800 feet above the general elevation in the area. It is not part of the Cumberland Plateau.

== Communications Towers ==
The top of this small mountain is the site of three tall communications towers used by local radio stations, television stations, wireless phone companies, state agencies, and other private companies. The elevation of Capshaw Mountain and its location make it uniquely valuable as the site for regional communications. From its towers, line of sight communications may be achieved as far as Nashville, Tennessee and Birmingham, Alabama. To the west this extends well into Mississippi and to the east to Chattanooga, Tennessee. The extent of such communications covers an area of nearly 125 miles (200 km) radially around the community.
