= Carpenter Performing Arts Center =

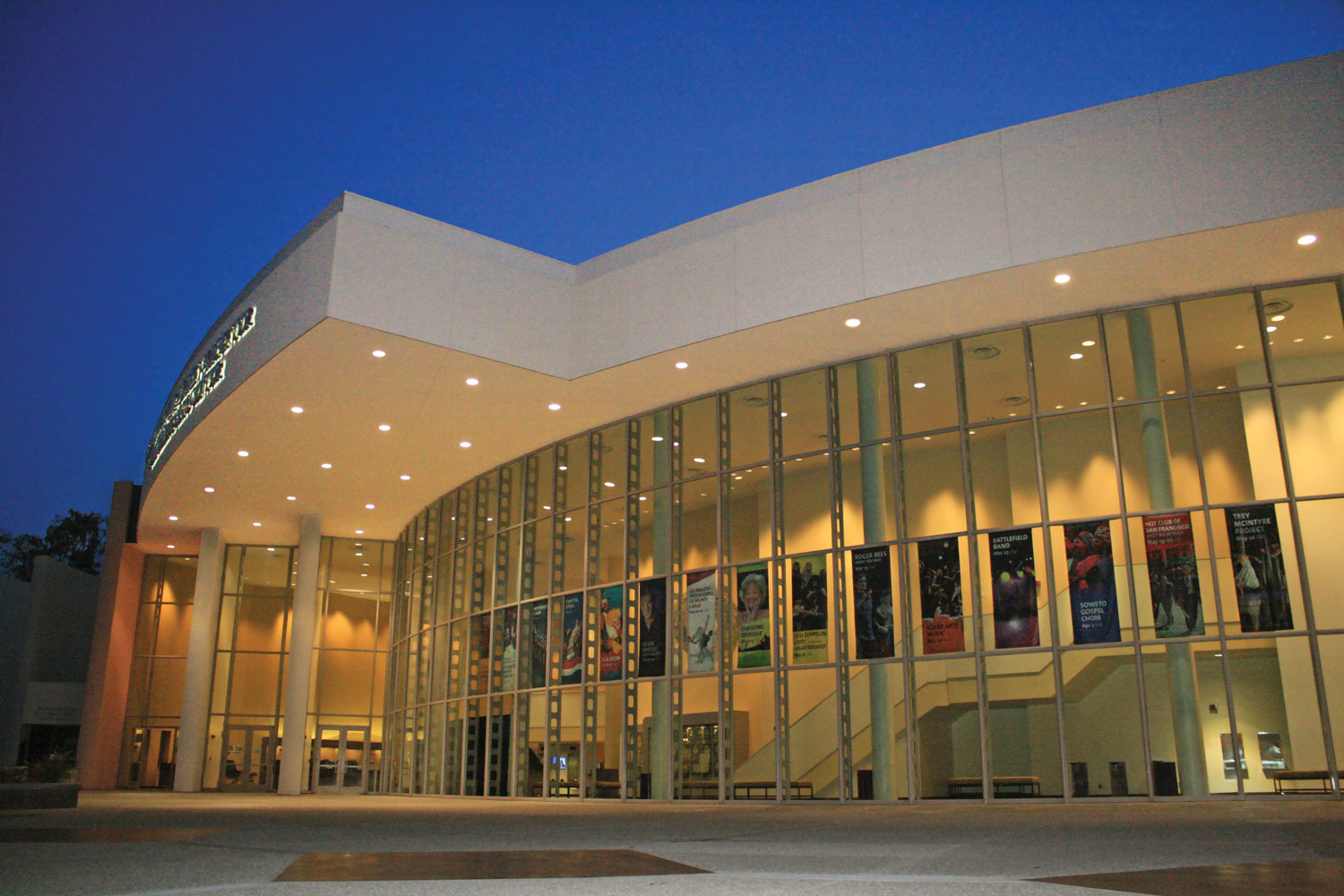
- Carpenter Performing Arts Center Exterior
- Interactive map of Carpenter Performing Arts Center
- Full name: Richard and Karen Carpenter Performing Arts Center
- Location: 6200 Atherton Street Long Beach, California 90815
- Coordinates: 33.788056°N 118.111944°W
- Owner: California State University, Long Beach
- Capacity: 1,054

Construction
- Built: 1994

Tenant
- Musical Theatre West

The Richard and Karen Carpenter Performing Arts Center in Long Beach, California, is a theater that hosts a variety of events, including films, forums, and musical and theatrical performances. The venue is located on the campus of California State University, Long Beach. It was built in 1994 and has seating for 1,054. The stage area was modeled after the New York State Theater of the Arts at Lincoln Center. The Carpenter Performing Arts Center is named for Richard and Karen Carpenter, alumni of the university and donors to the center.

Musical Theatre West has been producing shows at the Carpenter Performing Arts Center since 1997.
