= Ice Wars =

Recurring figure skating competition

Ice Wars was an annual elite figure skating team competition. The first Ice Wars took place in 1994. The competition format was "Team World" vs. "Team USA" or "Team North America". The 2005 competition was one exception, with the format changed to a "Battle of the Sexes" format, Men vs. Ladies. It was an unsanctioned made-for-TV professional event, meaning that skaters who participated would lose their eligibility to compete in the Winter Olympics and other events recognized by the International Skating Union.

Men, ladies, pair skaters, and ice dancers have all taken part in Ice Wars, though in 2005 only single skaters competed.

The event took place in November, changing locations each year.

The 2001 competition was renamed "World Ice Challenge" after the September 11, 2001 attacks on the United States.

== Ice Wars winners ==
Year	1994	1995	1996	1997	1998	1999	2000	2001	2002	2003	2004	2005	2006
Winner	USA	USA	USA	World	USA	USA	World	USA	USA	World	World	Men	World
