= Albergoni =

Albergoni may refer to:

- Villa Albergoni, a residence in Moscazzano, Lombardy, Italy
- Palazzo Arrigoni Albergoni, a residence in Crema, Lombardy, Italy
- Attilio Albergoni (born 1949), Italian military researcher and writer
- Albergoni family, a noble family from Italy

== See also ==
- Alberoni (disambiguation)
