= Alberoni (surname) =

Alberoni as a surname is an uncommon family name. It has been found in fewer than 200 families most with heritage in the province of Piacenza (Italy).

- Francesco Alberoni (born 1929), Italian sociologist and journalist
- Francisco Alberoni
- Giovanni Battista Alberoni (1703–1784), Italian painter, scenic designer, and engraver of the late-Baroque period
- Giulio Alberoni (1664–1752), Italian cardinal and statesman
- Paolo G. Alberoni, (born 1963), Italian financier and businessman author of the "Shareholder Ownership Value"
- Sherry Alberoni (born 1946), American actress and voice artist

== See also ==
- Alberoni (disambiguation)
