= Palazzo Donati =

Palazzo Donati may refer to:

- Palazzo Donati (formerly Albergoni, Vimercati) in Crema, Lombardy
- Palazzo Donati (formerly Benzoni, Bernardi, Vailati), in Crema, Lombardy
