= Palazzo Arrigoni Albergoni =

The Palazzo Benvenuti Arrigoni Albergoni is a noble residence located in Crema, Lombardy, northern Italy. It is located on the Via Cavour, 8. The approach is through an archway from the street, which then leads through an iron gate into the main courtyard.

The palace was built in the 14th century by the Benvenuti family who owned it until the end of the 18th century.

== See also ==
- Villa Albergoni in Moscazzano
- Palazzo Donati (gia Albergoni, Vimercati)
