= Cascate del Serio =

- Cascate del Serio; Cascàde del Sère; Serio Waterfall
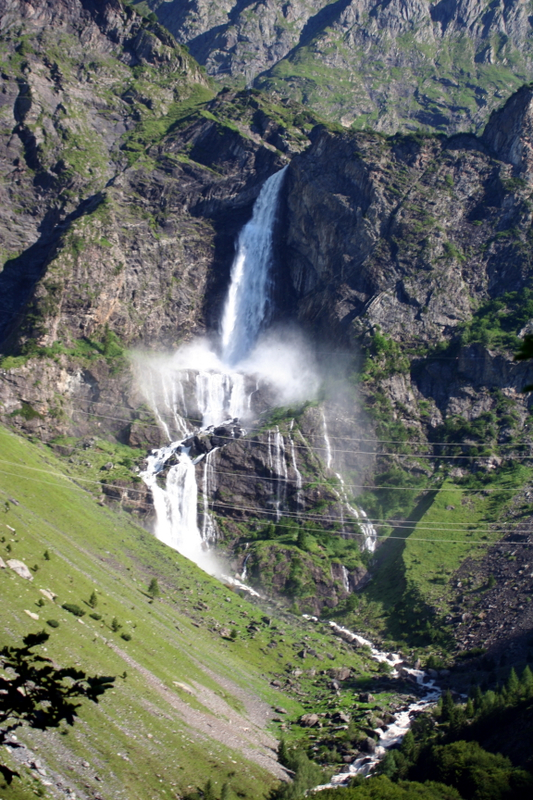
- Cascate del Serio, Lombardy, Italy

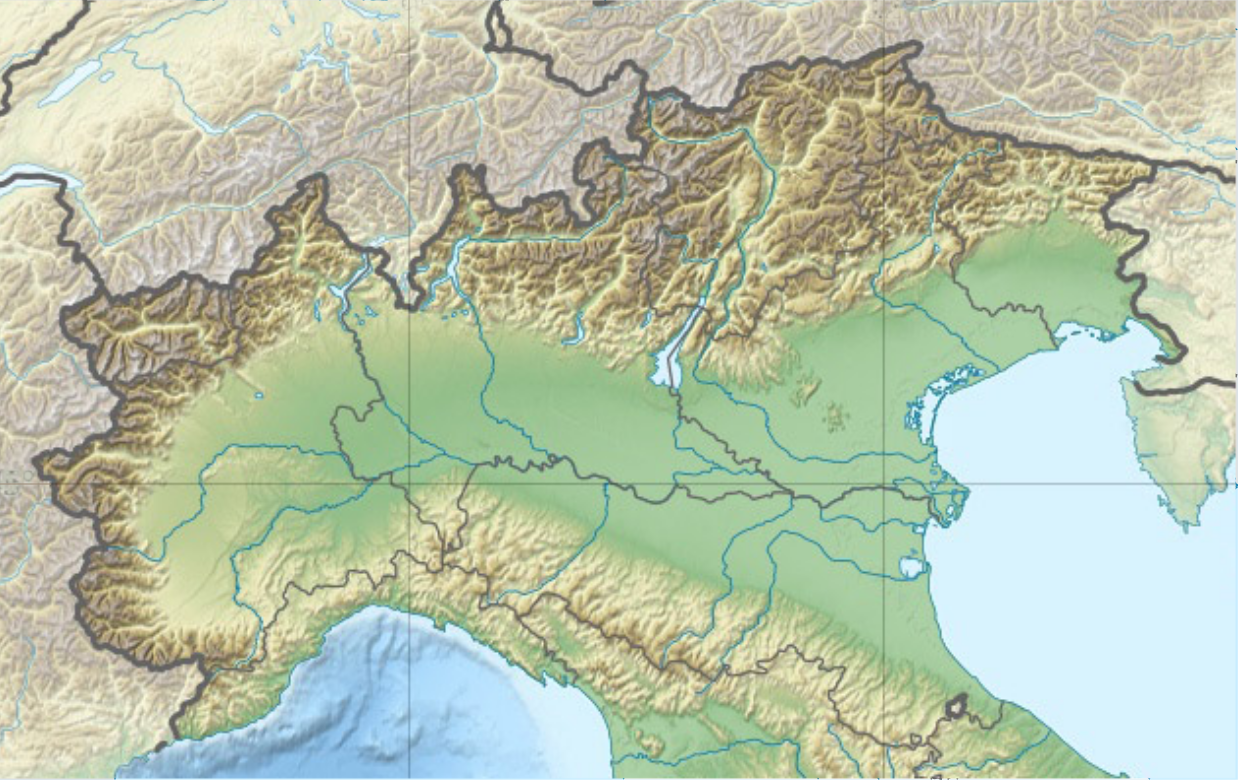
- Location within Lombardy Location within Northern Italy Location within Italy
- Location: Parco regionale delle Alpi Orobie, Valbondione, Bergamo, Lombardy, Italy
- Coordinates: 46°03′44″N 10°02′12″E
- Type: Plunges
- Elevation: 1,751 m (5,745 ft)
- Total height: 315 m (1,033 ft)
- Number of drops: 3
- Average flow rate: 5,25 m³/s

The Serio Falls (Italian: Cascate del Serio; Lombard: i Cascàde del Sère) are the tallest waterfall in Italy.

== Geography ==
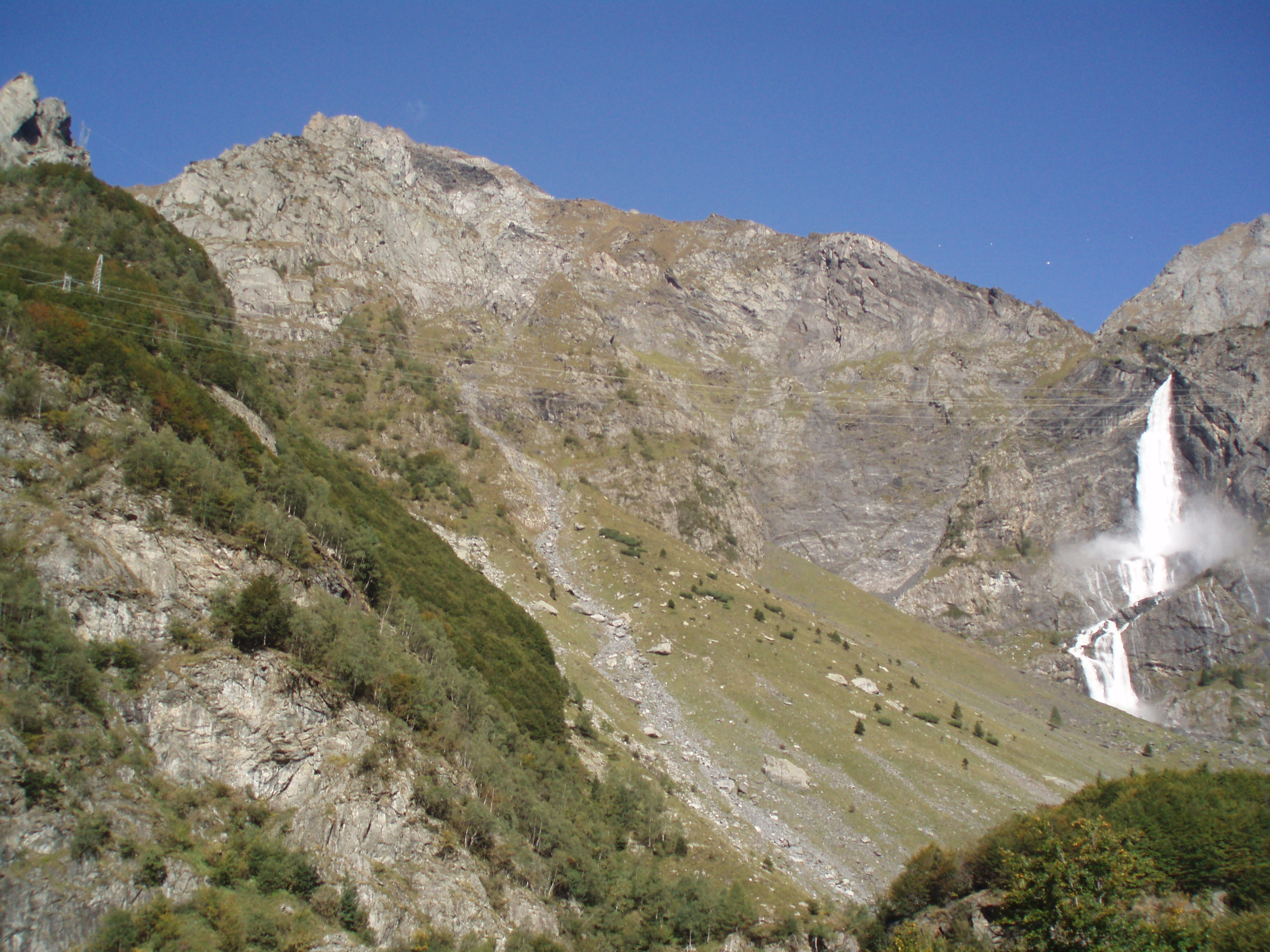
The Orobic Alps surrounding the waterfalls.

They are located 100 km north of Milan, 50 km from Bergamo, near the village of Valbondione, in the Bergamo Alps (Italian: Alpi Orobie) upper Valle Seriana, Province of Bergamo, in the alpine Lombardy region of Northern Italy. Located at 1751m MAMSL, the falls are composed of three main steps, respectively 166, 74 and 75 metres tall; taken together the falls have a drop of 315 m (more than 1000 ft). The falls are formed by the Serio River, at a short distance from its source in the Bergamo Alps (Alpi Orobie).

The falls are served by Bergamo Orio Al Serio airport (60 km), Milan-Linate (102 km) and Milan-Malpensa (145 km).

== Depictions in culture ==
The falls were used as a film location of the 2017 movie Call Me By Your Name by Luca Guadagnino.

== See also ==
- List of waterfalls
