= Call Me by Your Name (film) =

2017 film by Luca Guadagnino

- Theatrical release poster
- Directed by: Luca Guadagnino
- Screenplay by: James Ivory
- Based on: Call Me by Your Name by André Aciman
- Produced by: Peter Spears; Luca Guadagnino; Emilie Georges; Rodrigo Teixiera; Marco Morabito; James Ivory; Howard Rosenman
- Starring: Timothée Chalamet; Armie Hammer; Michael Stuhlbarg; Amira Casar; Esther Garrel; Victoire Du Bois
- Cinematography: Sayombhu Mukdeeprom
- Edited by: Walter Fasano
- Production companies: Frenesy Film Company; La Cinéfacture; RT Features; M.Y.R.A. Entertainment; Water's End Productions
- Distributed by: Sony Pictures Classics
- Release dates: January 22, 2017 (Sundance); November 24, 2017 (United States); January 18, 2018 (Brazil); January 25, 2018 (Italy)
- Running time: 132 minutes
- Countries: Italy; United States; France; Brazil
- Languages: English; Italian; French
- Budget: $3.5 million
- Box office: $43.1 million

Call Me by Your Name (Note: Italian: Chiamami col tuo nome) is a 2017 romantic drama film directed by Luca Guadagnino. Its screenplay, by James Ivory, who also co-produced, is based on the 2007 novel by André Aciman. The film is the final installment in Guadagnino's thematic "Desire" trilogy, after I Am Love (2009) and A Bigger Splash (2015). Set in northern Italy in 1983, Call Me by Your Name chronicles the romantic relationship between 17-year-old Elio Perlman (Timothée Chalamet) and Oliver (Armie Hammer), a 24-year-old graduate-student assistant to Elio's father Samuel (Michael Stuhlbarg), an archaeology professor. The film also stars Amira Casar, Esther Garrel, and Victoire Du Bois.

Development began in 2007 when producers Peter Spears and Howard Rosenman optioned the rights to Aciman's novel. Ivory was chosen to co-direct with Guadagnino, but stepped down in 2016. Guadagnino joined the project as a location scout and eventually became sole director and co-producer. Call Me by Your Name was financed by several international companies, and its principal photography took place mainly in the city and comune of Crema, Lombardy, in May and June 2016. Cinematographer Sayombhu Mukdeeprom used 35 mm film, as opposed to employing digital cinematography. The filmmakers spent weeks decorating Villa Albergoni, one of the main shooting locations. Guadagnino curated the film's soundtrack, which features three original songs by American singer-songwriter Sufjan Stevens.

Sony Pictures Classics acquired worldwide distribution rights to Call Me by Your Name before its premiere at the 2017 Sundance Film Festival on January 22, 2017. The film began a limited release in the United States on November 24, 2017, and went on general release on January 19, 2018. It received widespread critical acclaim, particularly for Ivory's screenplay, Guadagnino's direction, Mukdeeprom's cinematography, and the performances of Chalamet, Hammer, and Stuhlbarg. The film garnered a number of accolades, including many for its screenplay, direction, acting, and music. It received four nominations at the 90th Academy Awards, including Best Picture and Best Actor for 22-year-old Chalamet (the third-youngest nominee in the category), and won Best Adapted Screenplay, making Ivory the oldest winner of a competitive Academy Award in any category. The screenplay also won at the 23rd Critics' Choice Awards, 71st British Academy Film Awards, and the 70th Writers Guild of America Awards. Call Me by Your Name is now considered one of the best films of the 21st century. (Note: Attributed to multiple sources.)

== Plot ==
In the summer of 1983, Elio Perlman, a 17-year-old Jewish American-French-Italian boy, lives with his parents in rural Northern Italy. Elio's father, a professor of archaeology, invites a 24-year-old Jewish-American graduate student, Oliver, to live with the family over the summer and help with his academic paperwork. Elio, an introspective bookworm and musician, initially thinks he has little in common with Oliver, who appears confident and carefree. Elio spends much of the summer reading, playing piano, and hanging out with his childhood friends, Chiara and Marzia. During a volleyball match, Oliver touches Elio's back, but Elio brushes it off. Elio later finds himself jealous upon seeing Oliver kiss Chiara.

Elio and Oliver spend more time together, taking long walks into town, and accompanying Elio's father on an archaeological trip. Elio is increasingly drawn to Oliver, even sneaking into Oliver's room to smell his clothing. Elio eventually confesses his feelings to Oliver, who tells him they cannot discuss such things. Later, in a secluded spot, the two kiss for the first time. Oliver is reluctant to take things further, and they do not speak for several days.

Elio goes on a date with Marzia and the two have sex. Elio leaves a note for Oliver to end their silence. Oliver writes back, asking Elio to meet him at midnight. Elio agrees and they sleep together for the first time. Afterward, Oliver tells Elio, "Call me by your name and I'll call you by mine". The morning after, Elio is briefly conflicted about their encounter and takes out his sexual frustration by masturbating with a peach. When Oliver finds him, Elio cries about how little time he and Oliver have left together. Marzia confronts Elio after not hearing from him for three days. He responds indifferently, hurting her.

As the end of Oliver's stay approaches, Elio's parents, who appear aware of the bond between the two, recommend that he and Oliver visit Bergamo together before Oliver returns to the U.S. They spend three romantic days together. Heartbroken after Oliver's departure, Elio calls his mother to ask her to pick him up from the train station and take him home. Marzia is sympathetic to Elio's feelings and says she wants to remain friends. Elio's father, observing his unhappiness, tells him that the bond he had with Oliver was rare and that he envies Elio because he never had what Elio and Oliver had. He consoles Elio by advising him to keep his heart open for more joy and experiences rather than close himself off.

During Hanukkah, Oliver calls Elio's family to tell them he is engaged to be married to a woman he has been intermittently dating for a few years. Elio calls Oliver by his (Elio's) name and Oliver responds with his (Oliver's); Oliver says "[he] remember[s] everything". After the call, Elio sits by the fireplace and stares into the flames, tearfully reflecting as his parents and staff prepare dinner.

== Cast ==
- Timothée Chalamet as Elio Perlman
- Armie Hammer as Oliver
- Michael Stuhlbarg as Mr. Perlman (Note: Mr. Perlman's first name is not given in the film's credits or in the source novel. In an interview, Stuhlbarg said his character was referred to as Samuel or Sam during production, and the character is called "Sammy" once in the film.)
- Amira Casar as Annella Perlman
- Esther Garrel as Marzia
- Victoire Du Bois as Chiara
- Vanda Capriolo as Mafalda
- Antonio Rimoldi as Anchise
- Elena Bucci as Bambi
- Marco Sgrosso as Nico
- André Aciman as Mounir
- Peter Spears as Isaac
- Beppe Grillo as himself (archive footage)

== Styles and themes ==
Call Me by Your Name is the final installment in a thematic trilogy Guadagnino calls his "Desire" trilogy; the other two parts were I Am Love (2009) and A Bigger Splash (2015). Guadagnino described his approach to the film as "lighthearted and simple", a departure from his previous work, which has been called "highly stylised [and] dazzling". Guadagnino considers Call Me by Your Name a "homage to the fathers of my life: my own father, and my cinematic ones", referring to the filmmakers Jean Renoir, Jacques Rivette, Éric Rohmer, and Bernardo Bertolucci, who he says inspired him.

Guadagnino has described Call Me by Your Name as a family-oriented film for the purpose of "transmission of knowledge and hope that people of different generations come to see the film together". He sees it not as a "gay" movie but as one about "the beauty of the newborn idea of desire, unbiased and uncynical", reflecting his motto of living "with a sense of joie de vivre". "We should always be very earnest with one's feelings, instead of hiding them or shielding ourselves", he said. He considers it an "uplifting film" about "being who you want to be and finding yourself into the gaze of the other in his or her otherness."

Guadagnino tried to avoid the flaws he had seen in most coming-of-age films, where growth is often portrayed as a result of resolving preconceived dilemmas such as an enforced choice between two lovers. He also wanted the story to follow two people "in the moment", rather than focus on an antagonist or a tragedy—an approach inspired by Maurice Pialat's À nos amours (1983). As someone who considers sex in film a representation of the characters' behavior and identity, Guadagnino was uninterested in including explicit sex scenes in the film. He explained his intention: "I wanted the audience to completely rely on the emotional travel of these people and feel first love... It was important to me to create this powerful universality, because the whole idea of the movie is that the other person makes you beautiful—enlightens you, elevates you."

Alongside a sexual coming-of-age motif, the movie also touches on the novel's theme of Elio discovering and connecting to his Jewish identity through the openly Jewish Oliver and in contrast to his own family, who are, as his mother puts it, "Jews of discretion". Their common Jewish identity is a part of what draws Elio and Oliver together and is represented by the Star of David necklace Oliver initially wears, which Elio is drawn to. The theme of sexual self-discovery is paralleled by the Jewish theme: in both cases, Elio starts out secretive about these parts of himself and develops greater self-acceptance, both journeys connected to Oliver's role in his life. There is a hint that Oliver may have given Elio his Star of David necklace shortly before they parted ways at the train station. Elio's necklace can be clearly seen during the conversation from which the movie (and the novel) takes its title.

== Production ==
=== Development ===
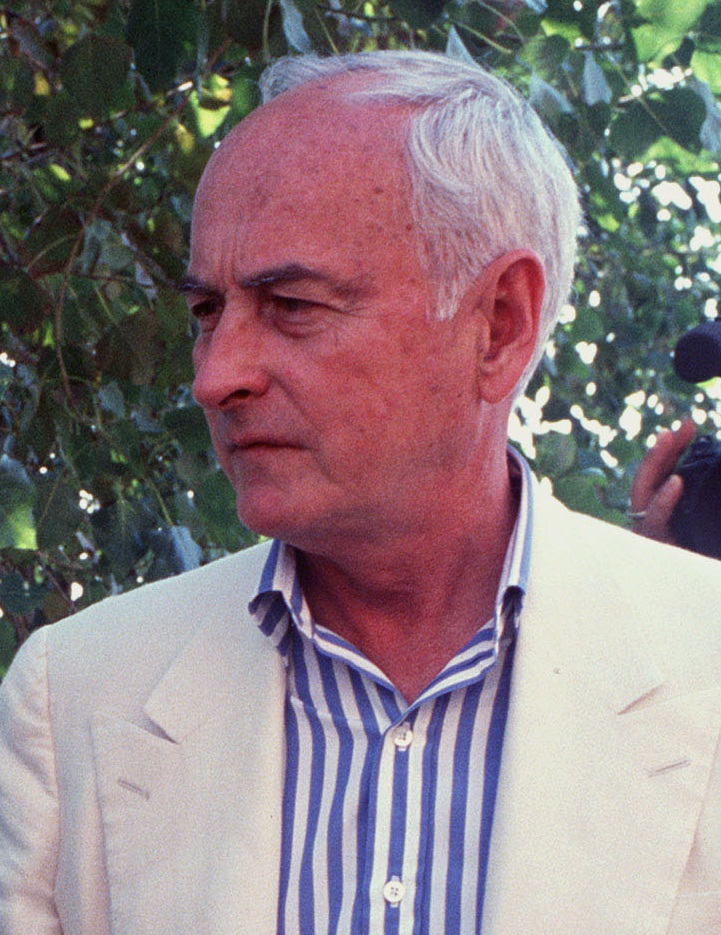
James Ivory, pictured in September 1991, took nine months to write the script, and had been set to co-direct the film.

Two of the film's producers, Peter Spears and Howard Rosenman, saw a galley proof of André Aciman's debut novel Call Me by Your Name in 2007 and "optioned" the screen rights before its publication. Rosenman first heard about the book through a friend after acting in Milk (2008) and called it "divine". Spears, moved by the novel and believing it deserved a cinematic adaptation, received his first credit as a producer from his work on the film. They invited their friend James Ivory to work as an executive producer on the film adaptation. Spears and Rosenman began production in 2008, but the project was soon trapped in "development hell". The producers met with three sets of directors and writers—among them Gabriele Muccino, Ferzan Özpetek, and Sam Taylor-Johnson—but could not find anyone who would commit to the project. Scheduling filming in Italy during the summer also proved difficult.

The producers contacted Guadagnino, their first choice to direct, but he declined, citing a busy schedule. But as Guadagnino lived in northern Italy, he was initially hired as a location consultant instead. He later suggested that he co-direct the film with Ivory, but no contractual agreement was put in place. Ivory accepted the offer to co-direct on the condition that he would also write the film; he spent "about nine months" on the screenplay. Guadagnino, who has called the novel "a Proustian book about remembering the past and indulging in the melancholy of lost things", collaborated on the adaptation with Ivory and Walter Fasano. Screenwriting took place at Ivory's house, Guadagnino's kitchen table in Crema, and New York City. Ivory rarely met Guadagnino during the process, since the director was busy making A Bigger Splash (2015).

The screenplay was completed in late 2015. Aciman approved it and commended the adaptation as "direct ... real and persuasive", adding, "they've done better than the book". The completed screenplay was vital in securing funding for the film. Among the financiers were the production companies La Cinéfacture (France), Frenesy Film Company (Italy, owned by Guadagnino), M.Y.R.A. Entertainment (United States), RT Features (Brazil), and Water's End Productions (United States). The project was also supported by the Italian Ministry of Cultural Heritage and Activities and Tourism. The backers deemed the production's initial budget estimates "too expensive", so the budget was reduced from $12 million to $3.4 million and the filming schedule was cut from 12 to 5 weeks.

Ivory stepped down from a directorial role in 2016, leaving Guadagnino to direct the film alone. According to Ivory, Memento Films International did not want two directors involved with the project because they "thought it would be awkward ... It might take longer, it would look terrible if we got in fights on the set, and so on." Guadagnino said Ivory's version would likely have been "a much more costly [and] different film" that would have been too expensive to make. Ivory became the sole credited screenwriter and later sold the rights to the screenplay to Guadagnino's company. Call Me by Your Name was Ivory's first produced screenplay since Le Divorce (2003) and the only narrative feature he has written but not directed. He remained involved with other aspects of the production. Guadagnino dedicated the film to his late friend Bill Paxton, who came to visit the set in Crema before his death in February 2017.

=== Adaptation ===
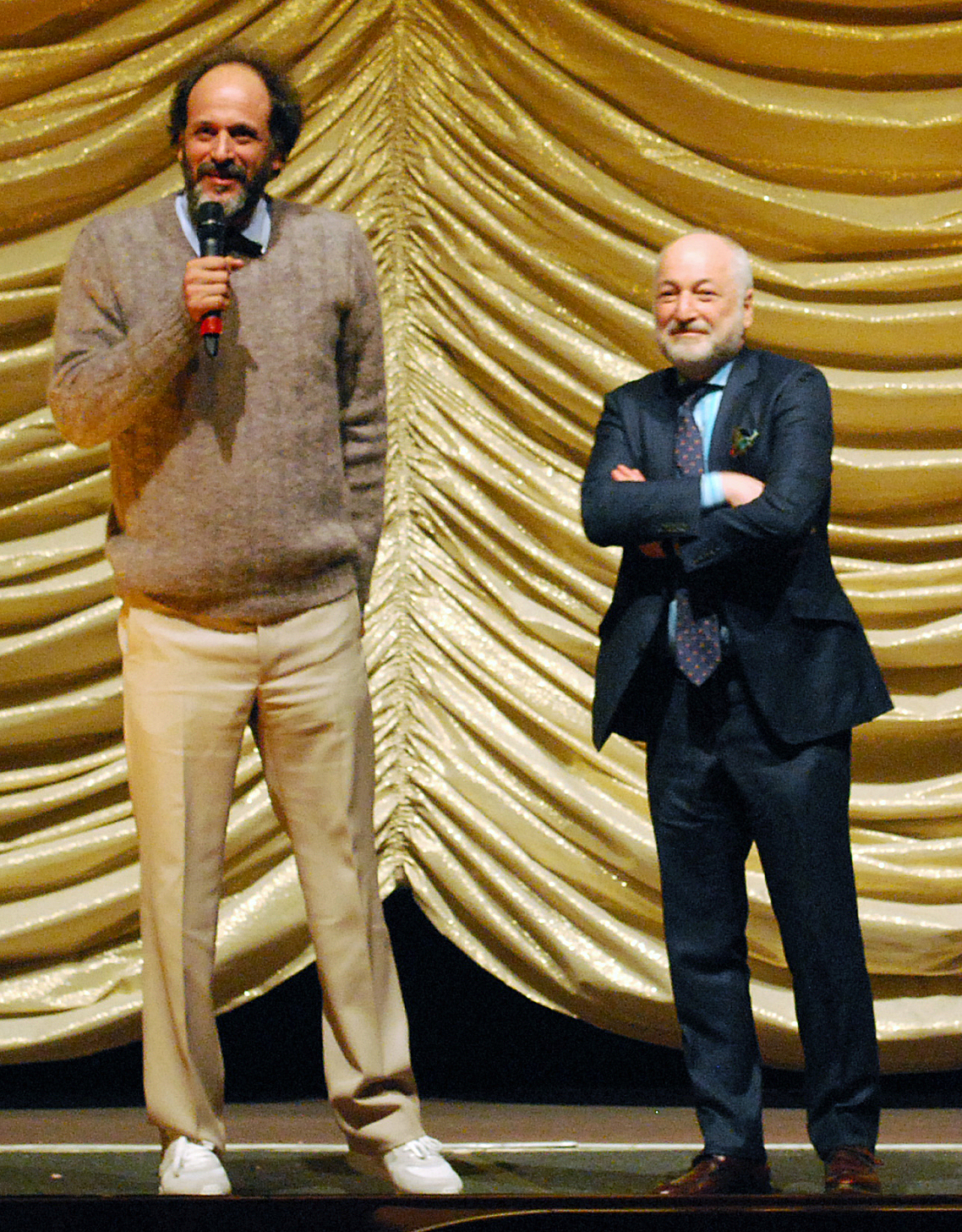
The film adaptation, as directed by Guadagnino (left), differs from Ivory's script and the source material written by Aciman (right).

The film differs from its source material in several ways. The novel is written in flashback, from Elio's perspective. The filmmakers set the movie entirely in 1983 to help the audience understand the characters, believing this approach would allow them to remain true to the book's spirit. The setting was changed from Bordighera to the countryside of Crema, where Guadagnino lives. (Note: Liguria and Sanremo were once depicted as the main setting in the book. Aciman, however, declared that the novel takes place in Bordighera, saying "I didn't want to name it in the book, but it's known. I go back to Bordighera all the time". During his time as a location consultant, Guadagnino suggested Liguria as the main setting to the producers.) The town square selected for filming differed from the one in the novel, which in Aciman's vision was "far smaller and stood high on a hill overlooking a windswept Mediterranean". Crema's arid climate and "spookily deserted" landscape suggested to him that the film would not correspond to the novel. Guadagnino also changed the year of the events from 1987 to 1983. In his words, Guadagnino chose "the year—in Italy at least—where the '70s are killed, when everything that was great about the '70s is definitely shut down", but also a time when the characters could be "in a way untouched by the corruption of the '80s—in the U.S., Reagan, and in the UK, Thatcher".

Guadagnino was tempted to remove the scene in which Elio masturbates into a pitted peach, finding it too explicit. Chalamet was also nervous about the scene, calling it "a metamorphosis of some of the strongest ideas in the movie" and the key to illuminating the character's "overabundant sexual energy". Both Guadagnino and Chalamet believed it was implausible to masturbate with a peach, but each independently tested the method. To their surprise, it worked, so Guadagnino shot the scene and included it in the film. A scene featuring Elio and Oliver dancing enthusiastically to The Psychedelic Furs song "Love My Way" in a small bar is not from the book. It was inspired by Jonathan Demme's Something Wild (1986) and Guadagnino's experience of dancing by himself when he was young. Ivory altered Mr. Perlman's profession from a classics scholar to "an art historian/archeologist type", a decision Aciman called "perfect" and "more visual, [...] more exciting, as opposed to what a scholar does at his desk".

When he revised Ivory's draft of the script, Guadagnino removed the voiceover narration and much of the nudity. He said that explicit nudity was "absolutely irrelevant" to his vision for the film, and that he did not like the idea of having the main character tell the story retrospectively, saying, "it kills the surprise". Toward the end of the novel, Elio and Oliver visit Rome, a trip that lasts an entire chapter and introduces new characters in multiple locations. Because of the film's limited budget, Ivory and the producers wrote several variations, one of which was to leave the lead characters alone in the family's house, before settling on another trip, to Bergamo, where the characters spend much of their time alone together in a hotel room. In Ivory's draft, Elio's parents discuss HIV/AIDS in two scenes and Elio decorates a Christmas tree in his family's home in the last scene. Ivory had to reduce the length of Mr. Perlman's speech but was committed to keeping it in the script. Aciman said in an interview that he suggested that Ivory keep dialogue before Perlman's speech to a minimum so as not to "steal the surprise and the suspense that happens" as it unfolds. Ivory described the scene in which Elio conveys his feelings to Oliver as one of the moments that captures their first love's "euphoric passion and nervousness". Aciman was surprised by Guadagnino's final scene, in which Elio weeps by the fireplace; he wrote of the film adaptation:

Cinema can be an entirely magical medium. What I do as a writer, and what Guadagnino does as a film director, is more than speak two different languages. What I do is chisel a statue down to its finest, most elusive details. What a film director does is make the statue move.

Many of the changes to Ivory's screenplay were made during filming; Ivory was not present on set. In May 2016, Ivory said that he and Guadagnino discussed how to film the scenes involving nudity, but Guadagnino later dropped them. In Ivory's view, some of Guadagnino's statements to the press misrepresented the film's omission of nudity as a "conscious aesthetic decision", as they had never discussed removing nudity from the screenplay. Ivory said, "When people are wandering around before or after making love, and they're decorously covered with sheets, it's always seemed phony to me." By contrast, Ivory cited scenes from his film Maurice (1987)—a gay romantic drama that includes male nudity—as "a more natural way of doing things than to hide them, or to do what Luca did, which is to pan the camera out of the window toward some trees." Guadagnino said he understood Ivory's position, but that it was clear that there were "no limitations on what we wanted to do."

=== Casting ===
In 2015, Shia LaBeouf and Greta Scacchi were reportedly set to be cast in the film. In September 2016, Ivory confirmed they were no longer involved in the project. Ivory said he got along with LaBeouf, who had read for the film in New York City, but the production company later felt he was unsuitable after his "various troubles". Ivory thought Scacchi and LaBeouf read well together and could have made it into the film, but the company disagreed.

Guadagnino was impressed by Armie Hammer's performance in The Social Network (2010), calling him a "sophisticated actor, with a great range". Hammer almost turned down the role of Oliver after reading the draft script because it contained nudity, saying: "There's a lot of stuff here that I've never done on film before. But there's no way I can't do this, mostly because it scares me so much." Hammer had played gay characters in J. Edgar (2011) and Final Portrait (2017).

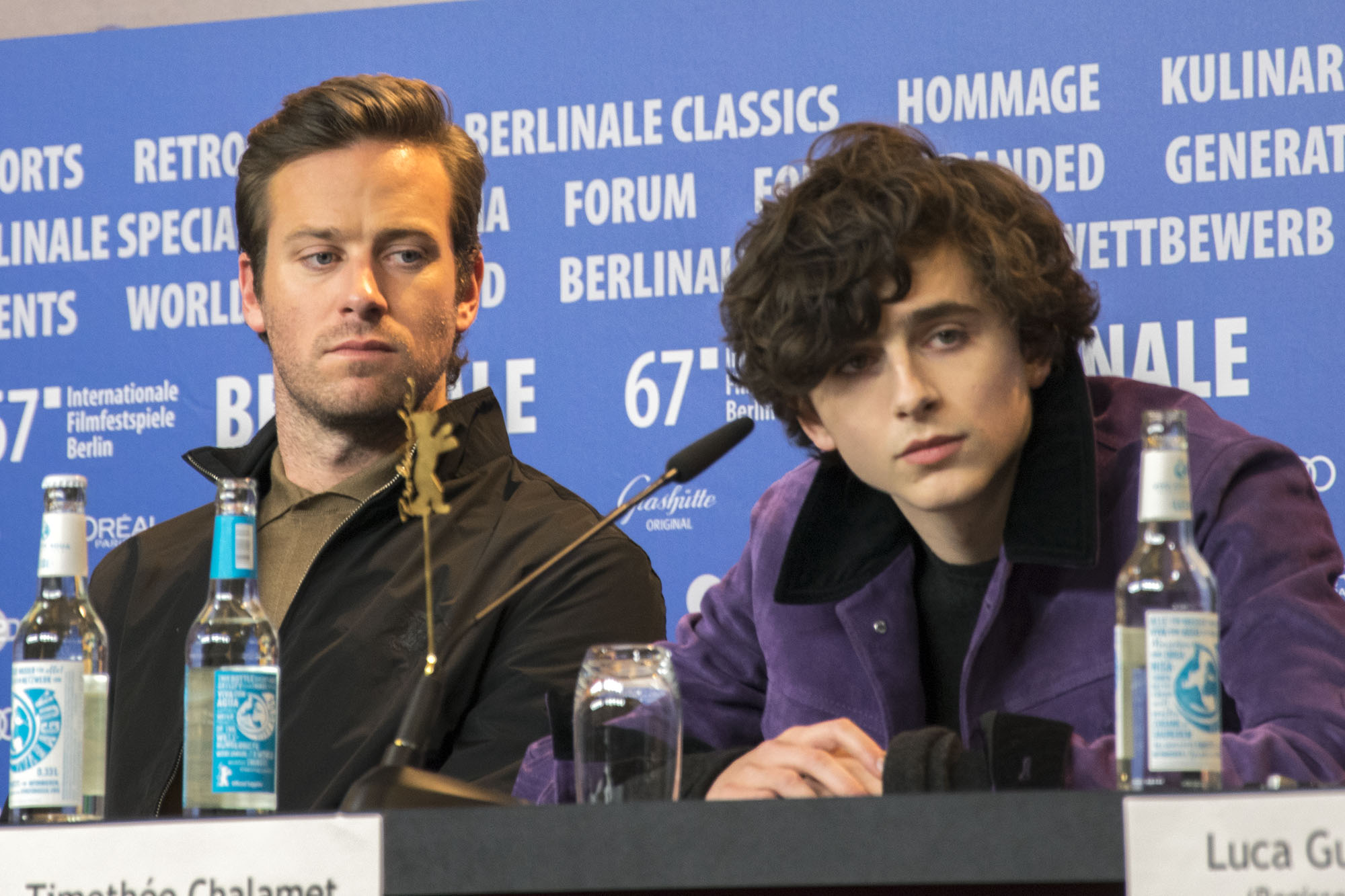
Hammer and Chalamet during the press conference for Call Me by Your Name at the 2017 Berlin International Film Festival

In 2013, Swardstrom—Spears's husband and agent—introduced Chalamet to Guadagnino, who immediately felt the actor had "the ambition, the intelligence, the sensitivity, the naivety, and the artistry" to play Elio. Chalamet had already read Aciman's novel and described it as "a window into a young person". Elio is fluent in three languages: English, French and Italian. Upon his arrival in Italy, Chalamet—who spoke French fluently and had played piano and guitar for years—prepared for his role with a schedule of daily Italian lessons, gym workouts three times a week, and work with composer Roberto Solci.

Michael Stuhlbarg, who was cast as Elio's father, did not read the book until he had already joined the production. He found the script moving and said Mr. Perlman had a "sense of generosity and love and understanding". Guadagnino contacted Esther Garrel when he was in Paris to promote A Bigger Splash. Garrel was cast as Marzia without a formal audition, and chose not to read the book before shooting. Toward the end of the film, Marzia asks Elio, "Friend for life?"—a line taken from J'entends plus la guitare (1991), directed by Garrel's father, Philippe Garrel. "I like the idea of talking virtually with Philippe Garrel through her", Guadagnino said. During shooting, Garrel spoke French with Chalamet on set and watched the American sitcom Friends with English subtitles to improve her English.

Guadagnino chose Amira Casar, whom he had known for 20 years, for the role of Elio's mother, Annella. In an interview, he expressed his admiration of Casar's "sense of transgression" and called her "the most audacious" actress in European art cinema. (Note: In the original French, "le cinéma d'art [et] d'essai européen," a term encompassing independent and arthouse films.) Casting director Stella Savino met Vanda Capriolo when she was bicycling in the countryside. Capriolo, who was not an actor, was chosen to play Mafalda, the Perlmans' maid. Aciman and Spears also appear briefly in cameo roles as Mounir and Isaac, an openly gay couple who attend a dinner party. Aciman was asked to be in the movie after actors became unavailable. "It was a last-minute decision", Spears recalled. "André turns out to be a phenomenal actor! So comfortable, not nervous at all. His wife was sitting there and said, 'I had no idea!'" In dialogue, the characters switch between English, French, Italian, and in one scene Annella reads a German translation of 16th-century French literature.

Hammer and Chalamet both signed contracts prohibiting the film from showing them with full-frontal nudity. The decision dismayed Ivory, whose original screenplay contained nudity. He criticized what he saw as an "American" attitude, saying: "Nobody seems to care that much or be shocked about a totally naked woman. It's the men." Guadagnino picked actors based on their performances and chemistry rather than on their sexuality. He said, "The idea that you have to cast only someone who has a certain set of skills, and worse, a certain gender identity in any role: that's oppressive to me."

=== Production design and costume ===
The main location set for the Perlmans' residence was Villa Albergoni, an uninhabited 17th-century mansion in Moscazzano. Guadagnino wanted to buy the house but could not afford it, and so made a film there instead. A landscape designer was hired to construct an orchard in the mansion's garden. A pergola was built on the patio, and apricot and peach trees were placed in the garden.

Guadagnino did not want the film to be a period piece and tried to resist making a film that would reflect "our idea of the 80s". His goal was an accurate recreation of the period that was invisible to the viewer. The crew, including production designer Samuel Deshors and set decorators Sandro Piccarozzi and Violante Visconti di Modrone, styled the house with furniture and objects inspired by the characters. Much of the furniture, including dishes and glassware from the 1950s, belonged to Guadagnino and Visconti di Modrone's parents. Di Modrone, a grandniece of Luchino Visconti, said, "That made it cozy and personal ... I wanted to give it the sense of time passing by". Many paintings, maps, and mirrors influenced by Asian art came from an antiques shop in Milan. The books seen in the background were all published before 1982. The swimming pool used in the film was based on a watering trough common in the area.

The filmmakers set up faded political billboards in public places to reflect the Italian general election in 1983 and re-created a newsstand full of magazines of that time. Residents of Crema helped the production team with their research, inviting them into their homes and providing pictures from the 1980s. Chen Li, the film's graphic designer, created a handwritten typeface for the film's title sequence of photocopied images of statues alongside items on Mr. Perlman's desk.

Costume designer Giulia Piersanti avoided using period costumes; instead, she wanted to provide "a sense of insouciant adolescent sensuality, summer heat and sexual awakening". The costumes, influenced by Pauline at the Beach (1983), A Tale of Springtime (1990), and A Summer's Tale (1996), included some pieces made by Piersanti's team. For the Perlmans' wardrobe, Piersanti took inspiration from her parents' photograph albums. For Oliver's "sexy, healthy American" image, Piersanti referred to "some of Bruce Weber's earliest photographs". Oliver's clothes change throughout the film as "he's more able to free himself". Aiming to emphasize Elio's confident style, she chose several Lacoste costumes and a distinctive, New Romantic-looking shirt in the final scene. For Elio's other costumes, Piersanti picked some items from her husband's closet, including the polo shirt and Fido Dido T-shirt.

=== Principal photography ===
- Map of filming locations in Lombardy

Principal photography began on May 9, 2016, and wrapped in June, lasting around 33 days. The film was shot primarily in Crema and the surrounding province of Cremona. An unusual series of rainstorms coincided with the shooting schedule, with heavy rain on 28 of the shooting days. Scenes set in the nearby villages Pandino and Moscazzano were filmed between May 17 and 19, and shooting in Crema began on June 1. Additional outdoor scenes were shot on December 4, 2016. The City of Crema invested €18,000 in the film, including a publicity campaign costing €7,500.

The arch of Torrazzo at Crema Cathedral and several historical locations in the streets of Crema and Pandino were chosen during production. Businesses requested compensation for financial losses caused by the closure, which was scheduled for May 30 and 31. Two days' filming at the cathedral were postponed due to the rainy weather. Filming also took place in the Lodigiano area near Crespiatica and in two small towns near Crema, Montodine and Ripalta. The archaeological discovery scene was filmed at the Grottoes of Catullus in Sirmione on the Brescian shores of Lake Garda. The trip to Bergamo was filmed at the exterior of multiple historical buildings, including Bergamo Cathedral, the Santa Maria Maggiore, the courtyard of Liceo Classico Paolo Sarpi in Piazza Rosate and the University of Sciences, Letters and Arts. The train station scenes were filmed at Pizzighettone. Because of security concerns, the production team was granted permission to film at the Cascate del Serio in Valbondione for only half an hour.

Before and during filming, the actors lived in Crema and were able to experience small-town life. Guadagnino engaged with the cast and filmmakers and often cooked for them and showed films at his house. Hammer and Chalamet, who did not have to do a screen test together, met for the first time during production in Crema. Before filming began, they spent a month together, watching TV and going to local restaurants. "We'd hang out with each other all the time, because we were pretty much the only Americans there, and we were able to defend one another and really get to know one another", Chalamet said. During the first two days of production, Guadagnino read the script with the cast. The first scene that Hammer and Chalamet rehearsed was the kissing scene, and they spent several days filming nude. "I've never been so intimately involved with a director before. Luca was able to look at me and completely undress me," Hammer said.

Selected filming locations

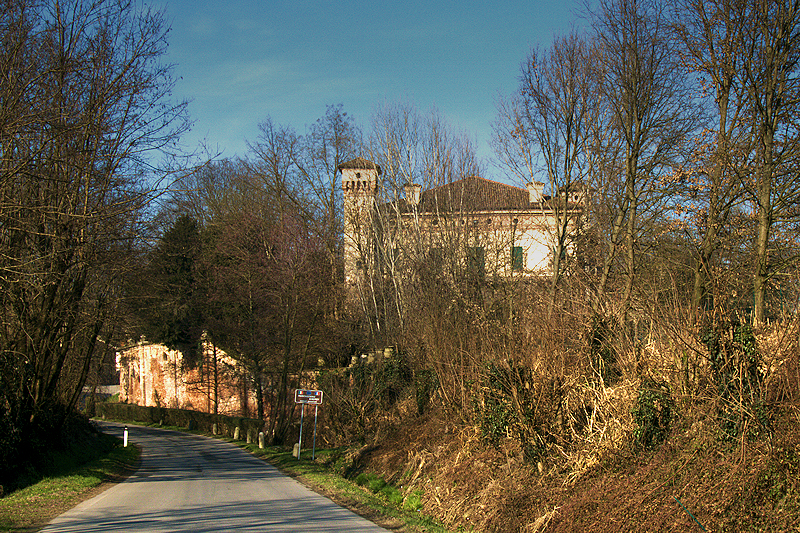
The Villa Albergoni

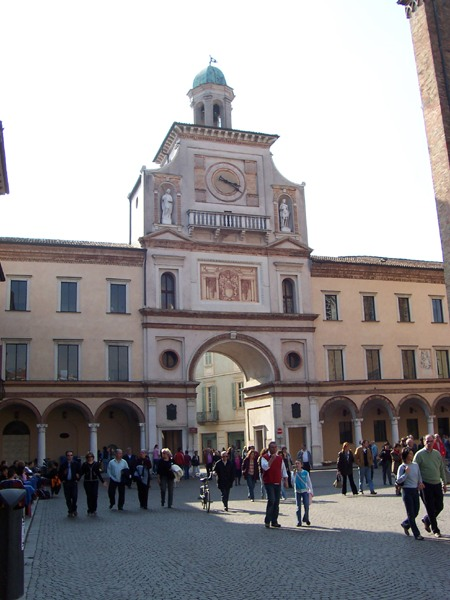
The arch of Torrazzo at the Crema Cathedral

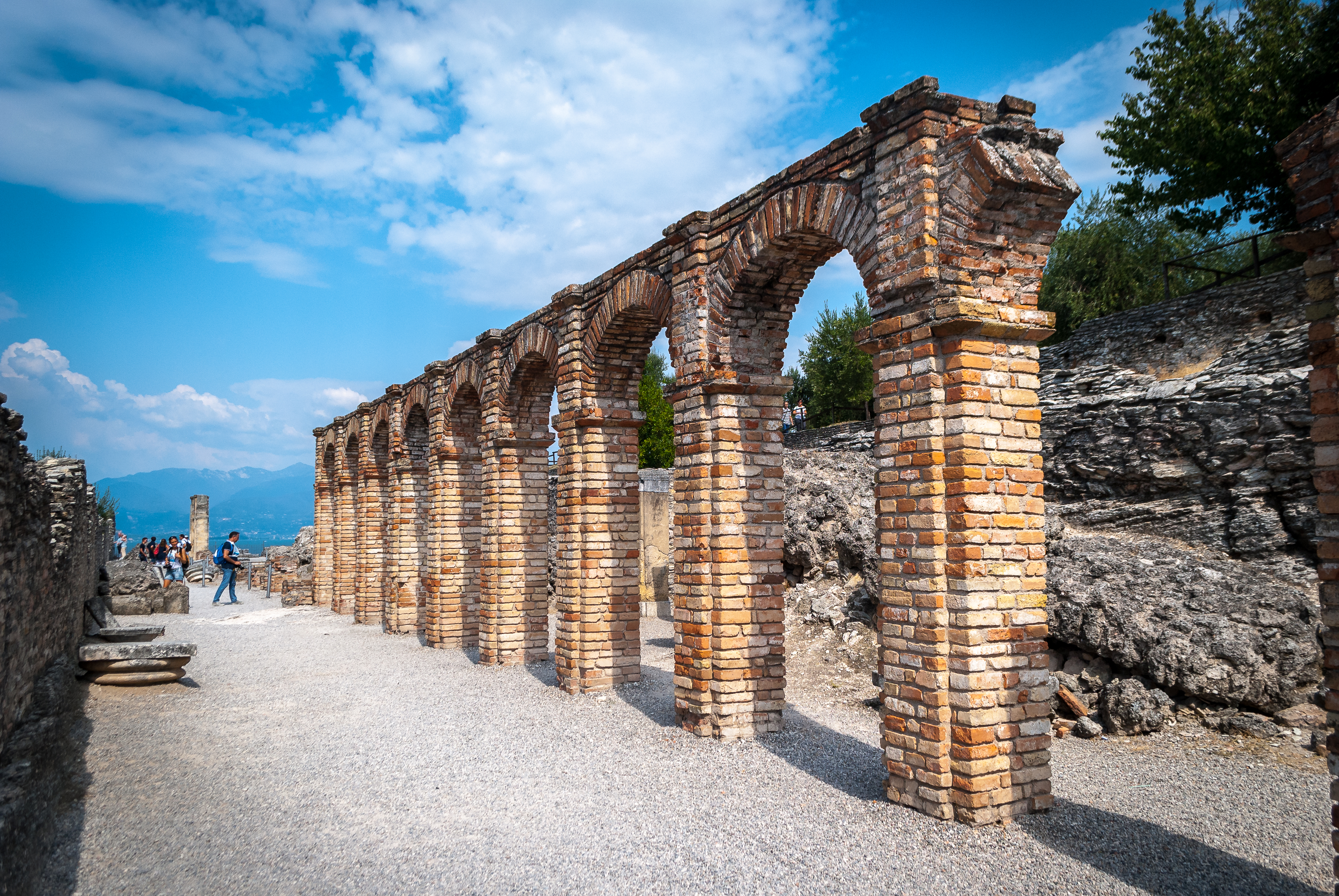
The Grottoes of Catullus, on the Brescian shore of Lake Garda

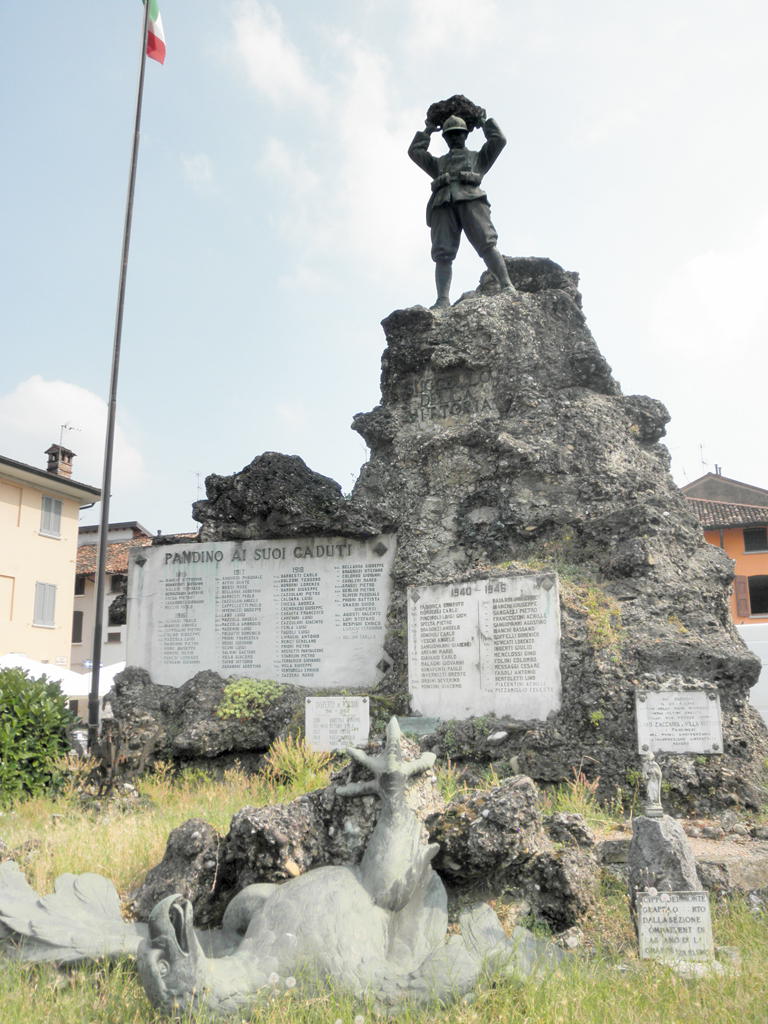
The Piazza Vittorio Emanuele in Pandino

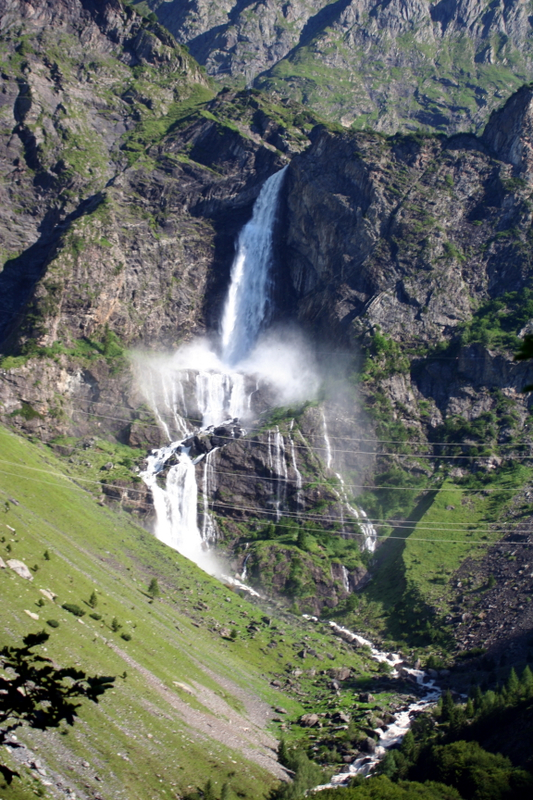
Cascate del Serio

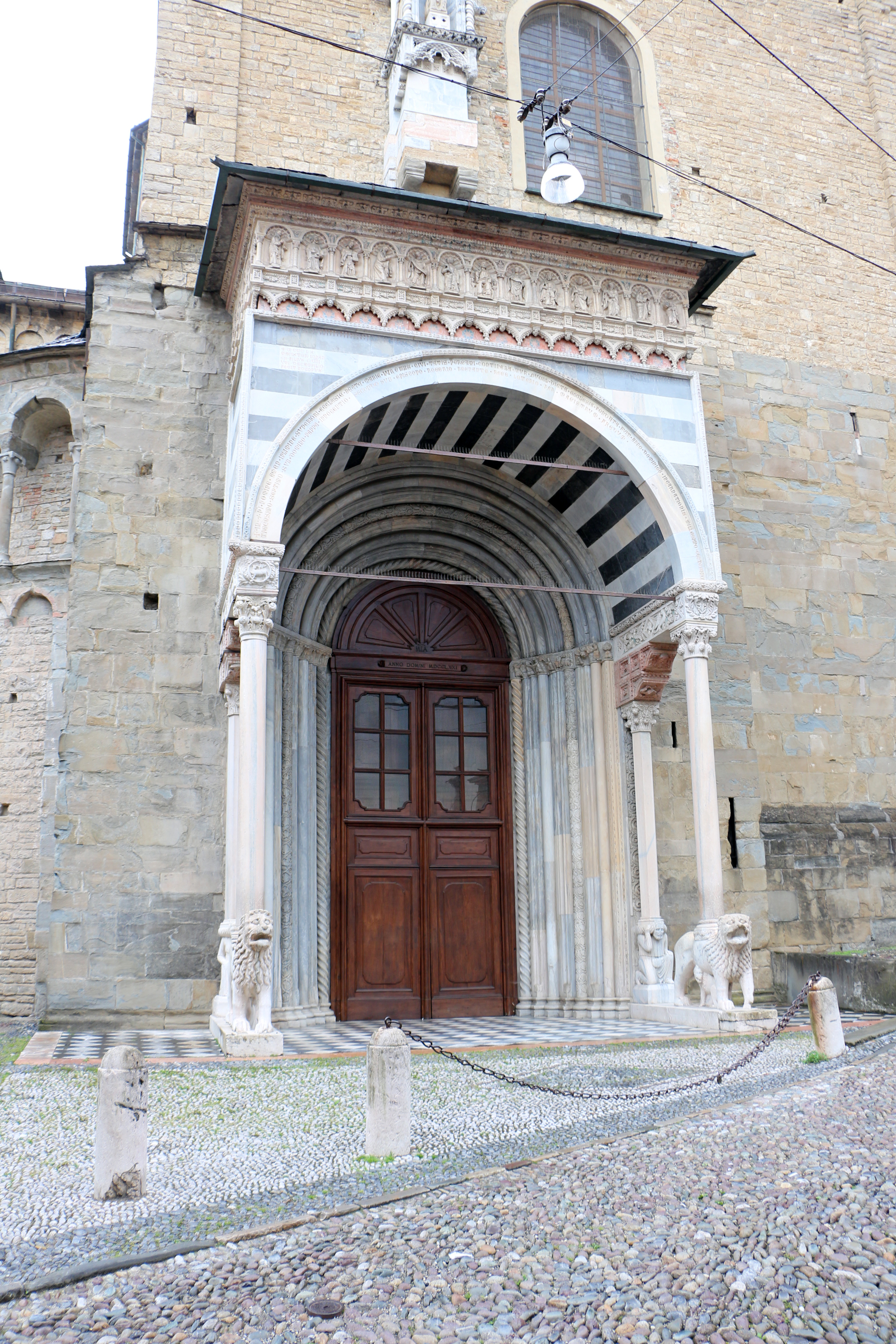
The South portal of Santa Maria Maggiore, Bergamo

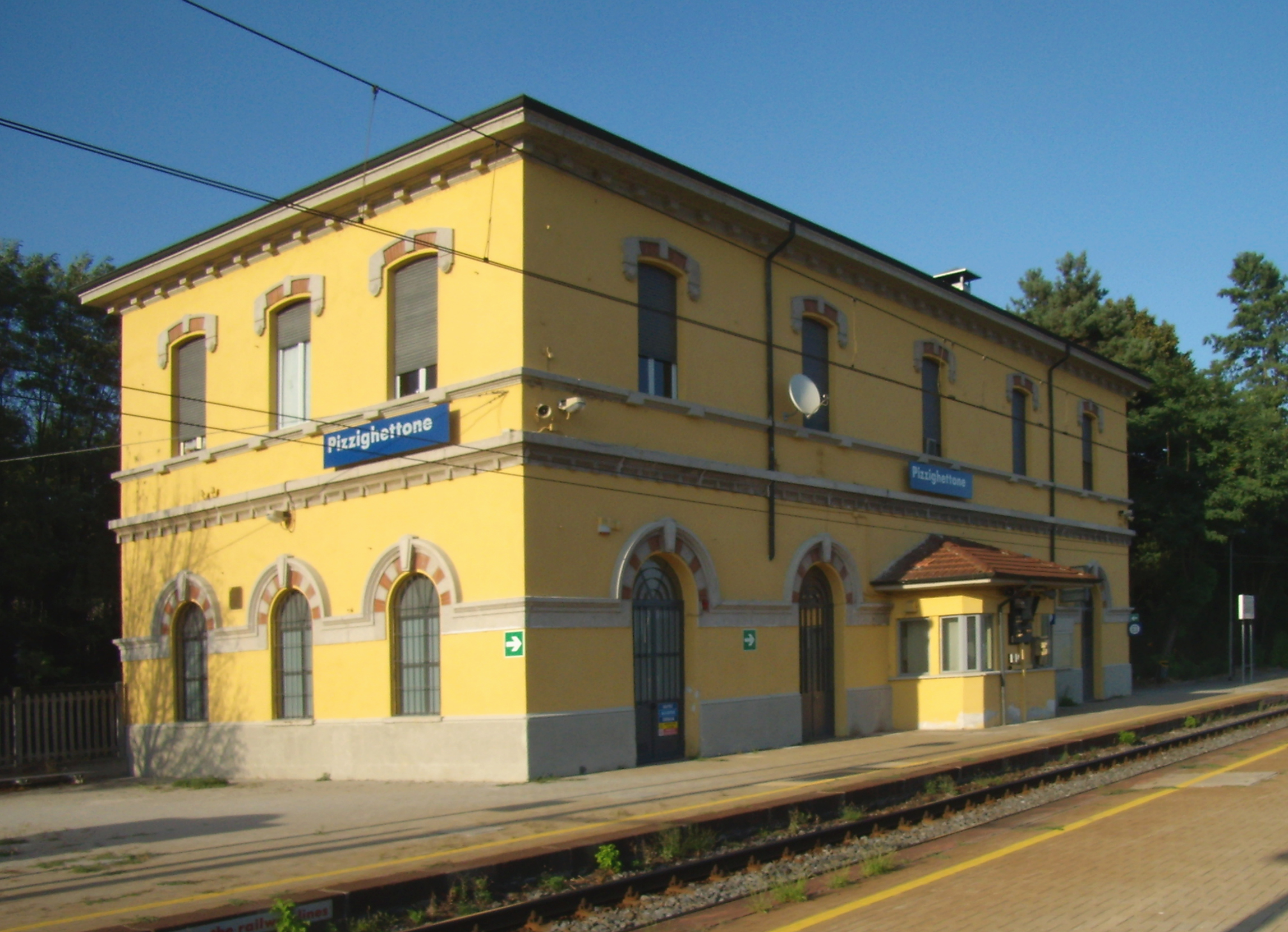
The Station of Pizzighettone

Guadagnino shot the film in chronological order, which allowed the filmmakers to "witness the onscreen maturity of both protagonist and actor", according to Fasano. The scene in which Mr. Perlman delivers an emotional speech to Elio was filmed on the penultimate day of filming. Stuhlbarg spent months preparing for the scene, which Guadagnino wanted to make "as simple as possible" by shooting fewer takes and "let[ting] the actors be." Three takes were shot and Stuhlbarg was "on three different levels of getting emotional". Garrel enjoyed filming her sex scene with Chalamet, which she said was filled with "joy and simplicity". Chalamet was listening to "Visions of Gideon", one of Sufjan Stevens's original songs for the film, in an earpiece while filming the final sequence; the director asked him to perform three variations of the scene, one per take. The camera was set in the fireplace with nobody behind it. "It was bit of an acting experiment", Chalamet said. During this scene, the title of the film is shown for the first time, rather than in the opening sequence.

At the Piazza Vittorio Emanuele, a memorial to the victims of the battle of the Piave in Pandino, the filmmakers laid a long camera dolly track to film the scene where Elio tells Oliver of his feelings for him in a single long take. This provided the flexibility and "flow of emotion" a cut scene could not. During the dancing sequence, Hammer had to perform to a click track in front of 50 off-camera extras with the music turned down so the dialogue could be recorded. In preparation for the scene, Guadagnino arranged for Hammer to practice with a dance coach. Hammer said it was "the worst scene" he had ever filmed. Choreographer Paolo Rocchi, who was contacted by the Frenesy Film Company in June 2016, called the routine "awkward and realistic". Rosenman considered the scene one of the most emotional moments; he said, "It embodied and encapsulated, for me, what teenage love is all about, what desire is all about."

Sayombhu Mukdeeprom, who had collaborated with Guadagnino on Ferdinando Cito Filomarino's Antonia (2015), served as the director of photography. He had read Aciman's novel before receiving the script and walked around filming locations to "get a feeling for everything ... to see the color, to see how the light changed during the day, and input it into my data". Mukdeeprom had to use artificial lighting to capture the Northern Italian summer atmosphere, compensating for the heavy rain throughout the shoot. While filming the confrontation scene between Oliver and Elio, Mukdeeprom wept in a corner of the room after they finished the first take, overwhelmed by a feeling of profound empathy for the actors. The film was shot using 35 mm celluloid film and a single lens, a decision influenced by the work of David Cronenberg to "solidif[y] the point of view" and make "the tension of the performance come off the screen"—even if it meant increasing the production budget above the cost of shooting in digital. Guadagnino praised Jean-Pierre Laforce, the film's sound designer and mixer, for his "wonderful" and "pivotal" contributions. Guadagnino had previously worked with Laforce on A Bigger Splash and said he was "able to create a sort of Cathedral of sound without overwhelming the movie."

=== Post-production ===
Fasano collaborated with Guadagnino during post-production. They had worked together since Guadagnino's debut feature, The Protagonists (1999). Fasano called working with Guadagnino "atypical [and] very demanding, but it's a great experience." Post-production took only a month, between June and July—the fastest they had ever edited. Fasano cited Bernardo Bertolucci's films and the "fast and unexplained" storytelling in Pialat's À nos amours as inspiration.

The film's first cut was three hours and 20 minutes. Fasano called it his favorite, saying it made him "lose [him]self in the story and the images". The final cut lasts two hours and 10 minutes with a shooting ratio of 25:1.

Several notable changes were made, or almost made, near the end of post-production. The monologue sequence with Elio's father once had piano music beneath it. The scene in which Elio and Oliver bike to a courtyard almost failed to make the final cut after one of the producers said it was inconsequential. Hammer said that some scenes were digitally altered to fix wardrobe malfunctions caused by his short shorts. Guadagnino has discussed several scenes that did not make the final cut. There was a "well-acted" scene where Elio and Oliver were "teasing one another" under a lime tree that Guadagnino felt was "too precious". A scene where Elio's parents make love in the bedroom while Elio and Oliver are kissing under the moonlight in the garden was also cut. The latter scene was shown at a June 2018 screening in Castiglioncello, which also included a deleted scene of Elio inviting Oliver to tour the village.

== Music ==
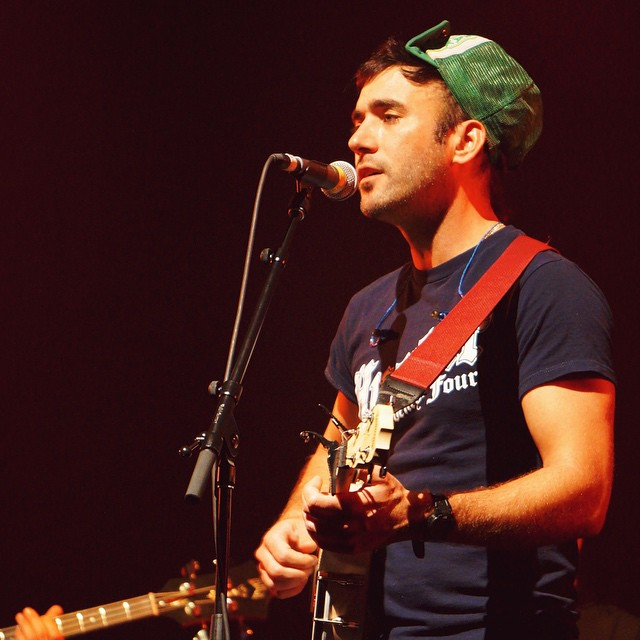
Sufjan Stevens contributed three songs to the film's soundtrack.

Guadagnino chose the music for Call Me by Your Name himself. He wanted to find an "emotional narrator to the film" through music, in a "less heavy, less present, and more enveloping" way than voice and text. Barry Lyndon (1975), The Magnificent Ambersons (1942), and The Age of Innocence (1993) inspired him. Guadagnino wanted the film's music to be connected to Elio, a young pianist who enjoys transcribing and adapting piano pieces and uses music to deepen his relationship with Oliver. Music is used in the film to reflect the period setting, the characters' family life and their level of education, and "the kind of canon they would be a part of". Guadagnino also researched which pop songs played frequently on local radio stations that summer.

Impressed by the lyricism of American songwriter Sufjan Stevens, Guadagnino asked him to record an original song for Call Me by Your Name and to narrate the film from the perspective of Elio at an older age. Stevens declined the voiceover role but contributed three songs to the soundtrack: "Mystery of Love", "Visions of Gideon", and a remix by Doveman of his song "Futile Devices" from The Age of Adz (2010). He was inspired by the film's script, the novel, and conversations with Guadagnino about the characters. He submitted the songs a few days before filming began. Surprised by the result, Guadagnino listened to them on set with the actors and editor Walter Fasano. Because it had been recorded, Chalamet was able to listen to "Visions of Gideon" on an earpiece while filming the movie's four-minute final shot, a static closeup of his face. He said, "Sufjan's song was playing in my ear so I could mirror the structure." The project marked the first time Stevens had written songs explicitly for a feature-film soundtrack. Alongside Stevens's songs, several classical pieces and 1980s pop songs are on the soundtrack.

Madison Gate Records and Sony Classical released a soundtrack album in digital formats on November 3, 2017, and in physical formats on November 17. It features songs by Stevens, the Psychedelic Furs, Franco Battiato, Loredana Bertè, Bandolero, Giorgio Moroder, Joe Esposito, and F. R. David, as well as music by John Adams, Erik Satie, Ryuichi Sakamoto, Bach, and Ravel. As of February 1, 2018, the soundtrack had sold 9,000 copies and had 29 million on-demand audio streams of its tracks in the U.S., according to Nielsen SoundScan.

== Release ==
Call Me by Your Name had its world premiere on January 22, 2017, at the Sundance Film Festival. International sales were handled by Memento Films International, a French company, which screened a promo reel at the American Film Market in November 2016. Shortly before the film's Sundance premiere, Sony Pictures Classics acquired worldwide distribution rights for $6 million. The deal was negotiated by WME Global and UTA Independent Film Group. The film was screened at the Berlin International Film Festival on February 13, 2017; the Toronto International Film Festival on September 7, 2017; and the New York Film Festival on October 3, 2017. At the Beijing International Film Festival, it was originally scheduled for April 2018, but was removed from the official program with no explanation; Patrick Brzeski of The Hollywood Reporter wrote that the decision reflected the government's "consistent stance of intolerance toward gay content". That year, the film was honored at the Crema Film Festival: Aciman met the public on June 23, and Garrel joined the screening at the Crema Cathedral on June 30.

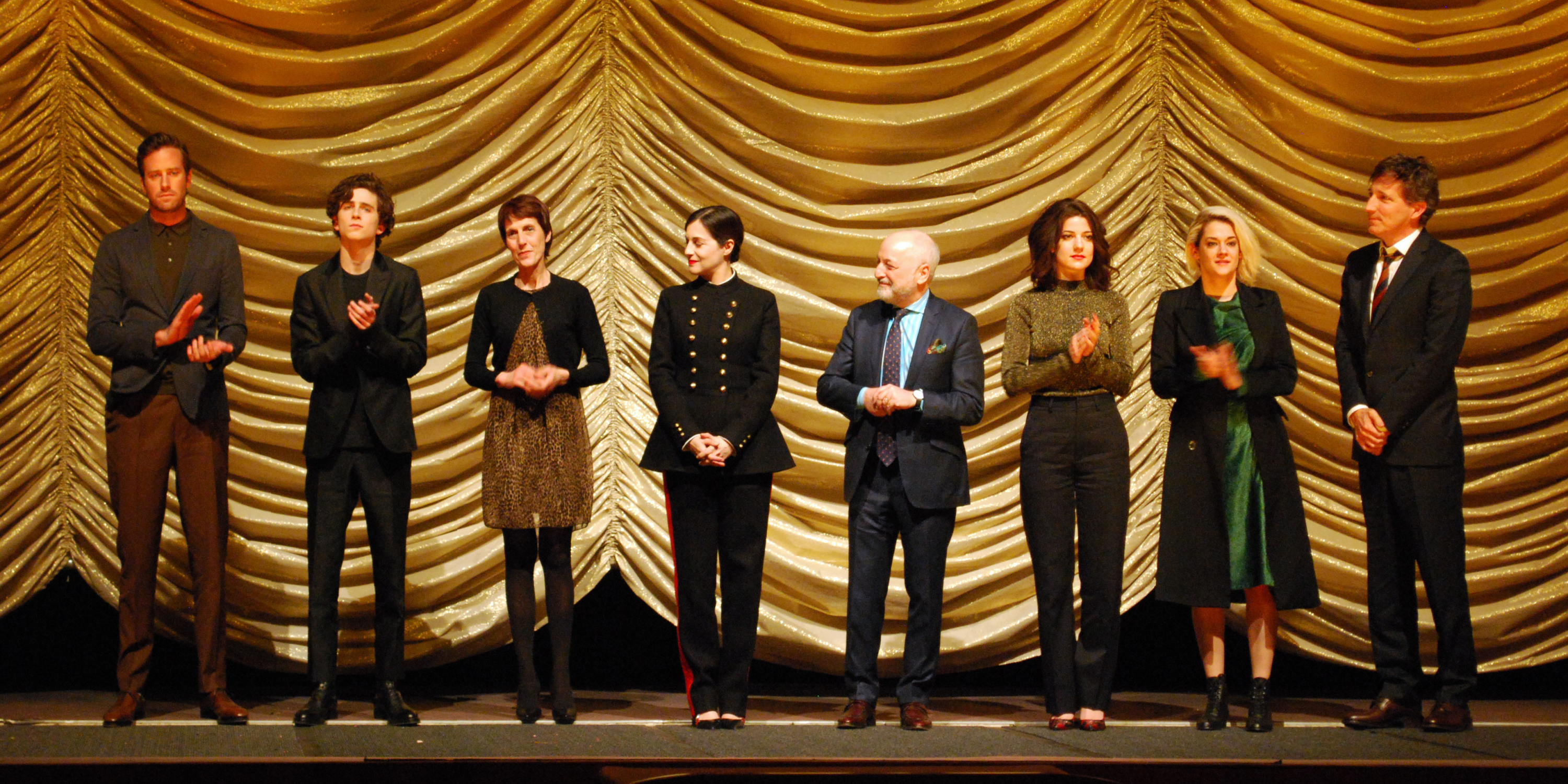
From left to right: Armie Hammer, Timothée Chalamet, Vanda Capriolo, Amira Casar, André Aciman, Esther Garrel, Victoire du Bois, and Peter Spears at the screening of Call Me by Your Name at the 2017 Berlin International Film Festival

Call Me by Your Name opened in limited release in the United Kingdom on October 27, 2017, and the United States on November 24, 2017. It expanded from four to thirty locations in the U.S. on December 15, 2017, then to 114 theaters on December 22. It screened in 174 theaters in January 2018, before going into wide release in 815 theaters a few days before the Oscar nomination announcement ceremony on January 19, 2018. On Oscars weekend, the film screened in 914 theaters, its widest release in the U.S.

Sony released the film through its output partner Warner Bros. Pictures in Italy on January 25, 2018. Special screenings and a public meet-and-greet with Guadagnino, Hammer and Chalamet took place in Crema between January 27 and 30. The film opened in Brazil on January 18 and in France on February 28. In March 2018, a distributor in Tunisia reported that the Ministry of Culture had banned the film as an "attack on liberties" because of its subject matter. In Ireland, it became the longest-running film shown at the Light House Cinema in early June 2018, after a 30-week run. In the Philippines, the film was screened accompanied by a live performance of its soundtrack by the Manila Symphony Orchestra on October 28.

=== Marketing ===
Sony Pictures Classics released an official poster for Call Me by Your Name on July 27, 2017. The first theatrical trailer was released on August 1, 2017. On October 11, 2017, Sony Pictures Classics released a teaser titled "Dance Party" to celebrate National Coming Out Day. The 42-second clip, consisting of a single take of Hammer and Chalamet dancing to "Love My Way" in a bar, became a meme on Twitter. Because of its use in the clip, "Love My Way" gained popularity on music-streaming websites. It rose 13% on on-demand streams during the two months before the film's release. In the week ending November 30, 2017, the song collected 177,000 on-demand streams, its biggest streaming week in the U.S.

Reaction to the advertisement on social media was somewhat negative, largely because of Sony Pictures' misleading use of an image of Chalamet and Garrel instead of a focus on the protagonists' relationship. Daniel Megarry of Gay Times described it as "an attempt to 'straight-wash' the movie's predominant same-sex romance". Benjamin Lee of The Guardian called the ad a "disastrous attempt to push Oscar-buzzed Call Me by Your Name as a straight love story", and said the advert "belies an industry awkwardly denying queerness". Sony Pictures Classics later aired several commercial spots to promote the film during its U.S.-wide expansion on January 19, 2018. To promote the film in South Korea, Sony Pictures released several never-before-seen set photos and pastel promotional posters illustrated by Son Eunkyoung in March 2018.

=== Home media ===
A pirated copy of an awards-screener DVD of Call Me by Your Name was leaked, along with copies of Last Flag Flying and fellow Oscar nominees I, Tonya and Lady Bird, onto file-sharing websites by the hacker group Hive-CM8 on December 24, 2017. The film was officially released for digital download on February 27, 2018. It was released on Blu-ray and DVD on March 13, 2018, with two bonus featurettes ("In Conversation with Armie Hammer, Timothée Chalamet, Michael Stuhlbarg & Luca Guadagnino" and "Snapshots of Italy: The Making of Call Me by Your Name"), an audio commentary track by Chalamet and Stuhlbarg, and the music video for "Mystery of Love". The film made $2,100,758 in DVD sales and $1,856,909 in Blu-ray sales in the United States, for a total of $3,957,667 in home media sales. In the United Kingdom, the DVD charted at number seven and the Blu-ray at number four on Top 100 sales for both formats.

== Reception ==
=== Box office ===
Call Me by Your Name grossed $18.1 million in the United States and Canada, and $23.8 million in other territories, for a worldwide total of $41.9 million against a production budget of $3.4 million. The film was Sony Pictures Classics' third-highest-grossing release of 2017.

In the United States, Call Me by Your Name began its limited run on November 24, 2017, at The Paris Theater and Union Square Theatre in New York City, and the ArcLight Hollywood and Landmark Theater in Los Angeles. The film made $404,874 in its opening weekend—a per-theater average of $101,219. It was the highest average of 2017—the biggest since the opening of La La Land the previous December—and had the best per-screen opening for a gay romance film since Brokeback Mountain (2005). In its second weekend, the film grossed $281,288, with an "excellent" per-screen average of $70,320. The film expanded to nine theaters in its third weekend, grossing $291,101 for a "solid" $32,345 per-theater average. It earned $491,933 from 30 theaters in its fourth weekend, averaging $16,398. The film expanded to 114 theaters in its fifth week and grossed $850,736, averaging $7,463 per screen. It crossed $6 million in its seventh weekend, earning $758,726 from 115 locations. It grossed $715,559 from 174 theaters in its eighth weekend, averaging $4,185 per screen.

In the film's nationwide release week—its ninth weekend overall—the film grossed $1.4 million from 815 theaters, an under-performance compared to "some of its competition with similar theater counts," according to Deadline Hollywood. The following weekend, after the announcement of its four Oscar nominations, the film's revenues dropped 6 percent to $1.3 million. With a total gross revenue of $9,370,359 by the week of January 23, 2018, Call Me by Your Name was the second-lowest-grossing film among that year's Best Picture nominees. However, the online ticketing company Fandango reported that the film had experienced a 56 percent increase in ticket sales through its service since its Best Picture nomination was announced. Regarding the film's "lagging" box-office performance, Tom Brueggemann of IndieWire commented that Sony Picture Classic "has done an able job so far", and said "at some point the film and the reaction to it is something no distributor can overcome". It grossed $919,926, averaging $1,006, from 914 theaters during the Oscar weekend, and went on to earn $304,228 from 309 theaters in its sixteenth weekend.

Call Me by Your Name opened at number seven in Italy with €781,000 and obtained the best per-theater average of the week. It made €49,170 on February 6 and reached €2 million by the end of the week. It re-entered at number 10 on March 13 by making another €13,731 at the box office. As of July 6, 2018, the film had grossed $3,925,137 in Italy. It attracted 17,152 viewers in France on its first day of screening, with an "excellent" per-theater average of 184 entries. It went on to attract 108,500 viewers in the opening weekend, earning 1,167 viewings—the second-best average that week—and 238,124 viewers in its third weekend. As of April 17, 2018, the film had grossed $2,652,781 in France. In the United Kingdom, the film earned £231,995 ($306,000) from 112 screens in its opening weekend, including £4,000 from previews. After ten days, it had made £568,000 ($745,000), before reaching the $1 million mark (£767,000) in its third weekend. As of May 21, 2018, the film had grossed $2,372,382 in the United Kingdom.

=== Critical response ===
At its premiere at the Sundance Film Festival, Call Me by Your Name received a standing ovation. When it screened at Alice Tully Hall as part of the New York Film Festival, it received a ten-minute ovation, the longest in the festival's history. On review aggregator Rotten Tomatoes, the film has an approval rating of 95% based on 363 reviews, with an average rating of 8.8/10. The website's critical consensus reads, "Call Me by Your Name offers a melancholy, powerfully affecting portrait of first love, empathetically acted by Timothée Chalamet and Armie Hammer." It was the best-reviewed limited release and the second-best-reviewed romance film of 2017 on the site. On Metacritic, the film has an average weighted score of 94 out of 100, based on 53 critics, indicating "universal acclaim". It was the year's fifth-best rated film on Metacritic.

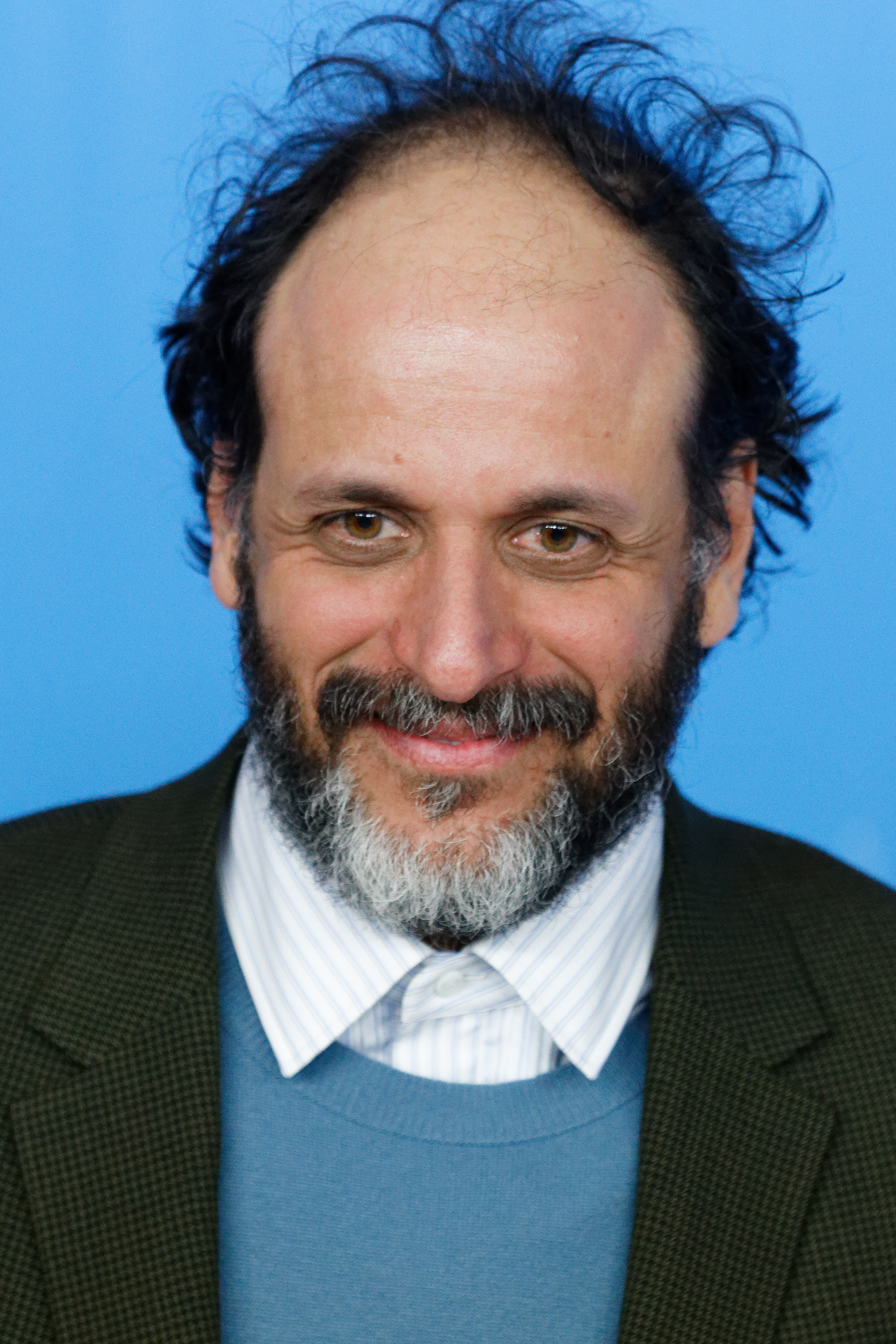
Guadagnino's direction was particularly praised by critics.

Writing for The Hollywood Reporter, Boyd van Hoeij described Call Me by Your Name as an "extremely sensual ... intimate and piercingly honest" adaptation of Aciman's novel and called Chalamet's performance "the true breakout of the film". Peter Debruge of Variety wrote that the film "advances the canon of gay cinema" by portraying "a story of first love ... that transcends the same-sex dynamic of its central couple". He compared Guadagnino's "sensual" direction to Pedro Almodóvar and François Ozon, and put Call Me by Your Name "on par with the best of their work". David Ehrlich of IndieWire also praised Guadagnino's directing, which he said helped the film "match the artistry and empathy" of Carol (2015) and Moonlight (2016). Sam Adams of the BBC wrote that Stuhlbarg's performance "puts a frame around the movie's painting and opens up avenues we may not have thought to explore", and called it "one of his finest" to date. He extolled the film as one of "many movies that have so successfully appealed to both the intellectual and the erotic since the heydays of Patrice Chéreau and André Téchiné".

Ty Burr of The Boston Globe gave the film three and a half stars, commended Guadagnino for "broaden[ing] his embrace of humanity while hitting new heights of cinematic bliss", and wrote that the film "may be a fantasy but it's one that's lovely and wise." David Morgan of CBS praised the cinematography, production design, and costuming for "making a summer in the 1980s palpably alive again." He found Stuhlbarg's character "the most forward-thinking parent in movie history". Richard Lawson wrote that Guadagnino's adaptation "was made with real love, with good intentions, with a clarity of heart and purposeful, unpretentious intellect" and hailed it as a "modern gay classic" in his Vanity Fair review. Chicago Tribune's Michael Phillips was pleased by Guadagnino's "wonderfully paradoxical" visual interests and wrote that Stevens's songs "work like magic on your sympathies regarding Elio's emotional awakening." He praised Hammer's performance as "some of the most easy-breathing and relaxed best work of his career."

The Economist noted the tension "between pain and pleasure" in the film and praised Chalamet, saying that he "evokes so many shades of humanity, portraying a path of youthful self-discovery that is more raw, unhinged, and ultimately honest than many actors could manage". Kate Taylor of The Globe and Mail, who gave the film two and a half stars, also enjoyed Chalamet's effort in capturing "first love and its inevitable heartbreak" and said the "multilingual, almost-pre-AIDS idyll does not stretch credulity ... but it can try the patience". Ken Eisner of The Georgia Straight wrote that "Guadagnino's lyrical excesses ... can alternate wildly between the poetically incisive and the indulgently preposterous." In an unfavorable review, Kyle Turner of Paste wrote, "The details of the film are too small for anyone, perhaps particularly a queer person, to see", a visual distance that "suggests that the film, in the beginning, is as terrified as Elio initially is. It never gets over that hesitation." Armond White of Out called the movie "craven commercialism" and a "super-bourgeois fantasy" that "exploit[s] the queer audience's romantic needs by packaging them and falsifying them."

=== Top ten lists ===
Call Me By Your Name was on many critics' top ten lists for 2017.

- 1st – Justin Chang, Los Angeles Times
- 1st – Christy Lemire & Brian Tallerico, RogerEbert.com
- 1st – Alonso Duralde, TheWrap
- 1st – Jake Coyle, Associated Press
- 1st – David Ehrlich, IndieWire
- 1st – Joshua Rothkopf, Time Out New York
- 1st – David Rooney, The Hollywood Reporter
- 2nd – Todd McCarthy & Frank Scheck, The Hollywood Reporter
- 2nd – Emily Yoshida & David Edelstein, New York Magazine
- 2nd – Tim Grierson, Screen International
- 2nd – Tomris Laffly, RogerEbert.com
- 2nd – Rex Reed, New York Observer
- 3rd – Peter Travers, Rolling Stone
- 3rd – Katie Rife, The A.V. Club
- 3rd – Richard Lawson, Vanity Fair
- 4th – Lindsay Bahr, Associated Press
- 4th – Bill Goodykoontz, Arizona Republic
- 4th – Peter Debruge, Variety
- 5th – Marlow Stern, The Daily Beast
- 6th – Stephanie Zacharek, Time
- 6th – Ann Hornaday, The Washington Post
- 6th – Mara Reinstein, Us Weekly
- 7th – Alissa Wilkinson, Vox
- 8th – Owen Gleiberman, Variety
- 10th – Michael Phillips, Chicago Tribune
- 10th – A.A. Dowd & Ignatiy Vishnevetsky, The A.V. Club
- Top 10 (listed alphabetically) – Peter Bradshaw, The Guardian
- Top 10 (listed alphabetically) – John Powers, Vogue
- Top 10 (listed alphabetically) – Dana Stevens, Slate
- Top 10 (listed alphabetically) – Joe Morgenstern, The Wall Street Journal
- Top 10 (listed alphabetically) – Kenneth Turan, Los Angeles Times

=== Depiction of age gap in a sexual relationship ===
The film's depiction of a sexual relationship with an age disparity between Elio and Oliver drew commentary and criticism—especially in the U.S., where the lowest legal age of consent is higher than in Italy. Elio is 17, and Chalamet was 20 at the time of filming, while the 24-year-old Oliver was played by Hammer, then 30. Queer Eye host Karamo Brown criticized the movie as glorifying sexual assault and said, "it looks like a grown man having sex with a little boy." Author Cheyenne Montgomery said she was disturbed that one of the protagonists is portrayed as a boy and the other as a man, saying, "Elio is portrayed very much as a child: He shaves peach fuzz off of his face, he cuddles with his parents, his lines are often kind of bratty and childlike, and he's being played as a sexy romantic partner to a character who's very much being portrayed as an adult." Physicians Renee Sorrentino and Jack Turban wrote in Psychiatric Times:

This film is about sexual predation. Oliver looks much older than his reported age of 24 while Elio looks like a very young 17-year-old. The power disparity in the relationship is clear. Elio is fragile and sexually naive. Oliver is experienced and directive in the relationship. ... Is it appropriate for a 24-year-old experienced in drinking to have sex with an inebriated and vomiting 17-year-old?

A feature in The Advocate, an LGBT-interest magazine, drew attention to other narrative films depicting heterosexual relationships with similar or greater age gaps, such as between the teenaged Scarlett and the 33-year-old Rhett Butler in Gone with the Wind.

=== Accolades ===
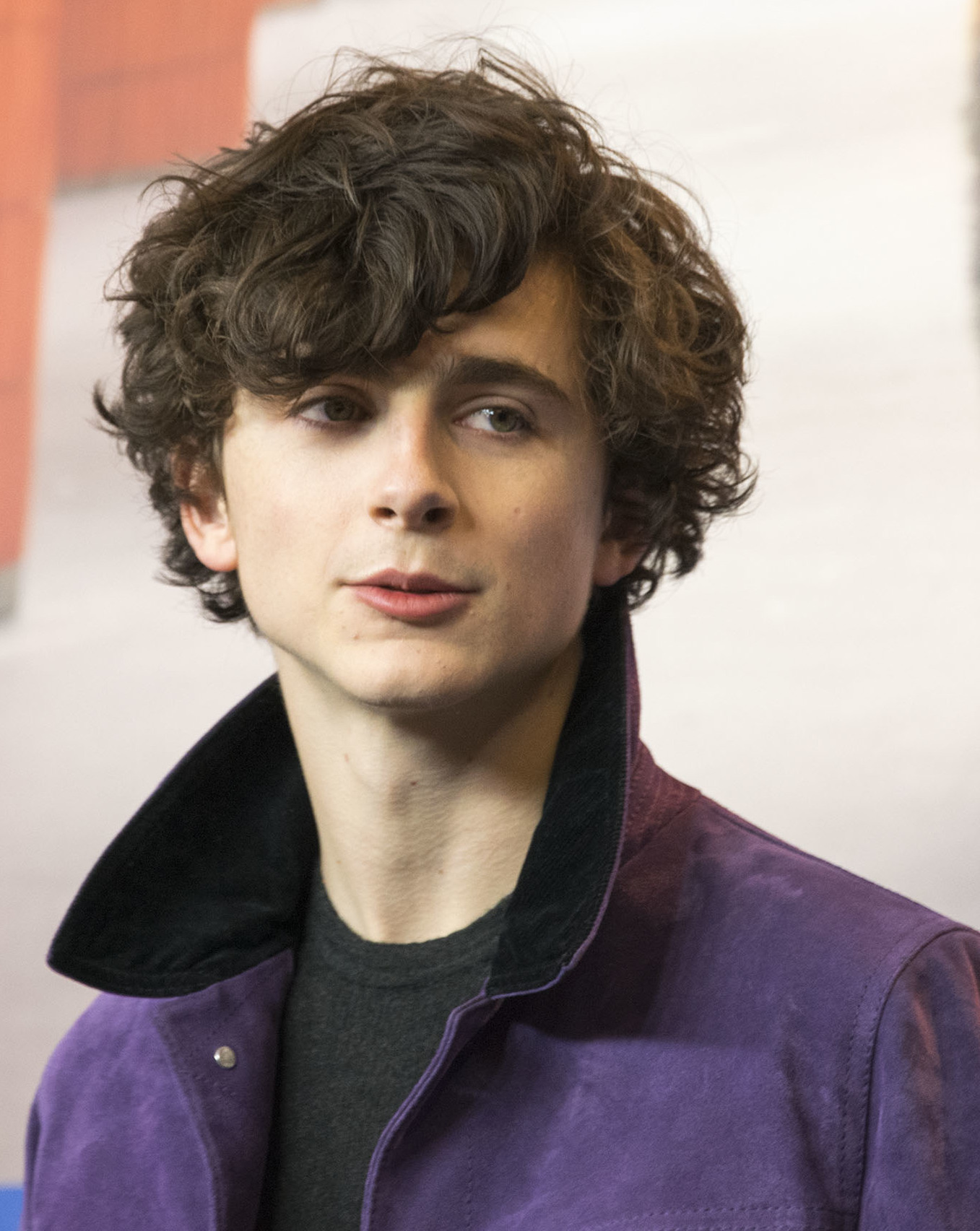
Chalamet's performance received widespread acclaim and earned the 22-year-old a nomination for the Academy Award for Best Actor in a Leading Role, making him the third-youngest nominee for the award.

The National Board of Review and the American Film Institute selected Call Me by Your Name as one of the top 10 films of the year. At the 90th Academy Awards, it was nominated for Best Picture, Best Actor (Chalamet), Best Original Song ("Mystery of Love"), and Best Adapted Screenplay, and won the last. Chalamet became the third-youngest Best Actor nominee and the youngest nominee since 1939, and Ivory became the oldest winner in any competitive category. The film received four nominations at the 71st British Academy Film Awards, including Best Film and Best Direction, and won Best Adapted Screenplay for Ivory. At the 75th Golden Globe Awards, it was nominated for Best Motion Picture – Drama, Best Actor – Motion Picture Drama for Chalamet and Best Supporting Actor for Hammer.

The film received eight nominations at the 23rd Critics' Choice Awards; Ivory won Best Adapted Screenplay. The film led the 33rd Independent Spirit Awards with six nominations, winning Best Male Lead for Chalamet and Best Cinematography for Mukdeeprom. At the 24th Screen Actors Guild Awards, Chalamet was nominated for Outstanding Performance by a Male Actor in a Leading Role. The film won the GLAAD Media Award for Outstanding Film – Wide Release at its 29th ceremony. In Italy, Fasano won Best Editing at the 73rd Nastro d'Argento Awards and 33rd Golden Ciak Awards. The National Board of Review, the Gotham Independent Film Awards, and the Hollywood Film Awards each gave Chalamet its Breakout Actor Award.

In a series of articles about the best of the 2010s in film, IndieWire ranked Call Me by Your Name the 18th-best film of the decade and Chalamet's performance the 39th-best acting performance. Consequence of Sound ranked the film the 23rd-best of the decade, Rolling Stone ranked it 40th, and Little White Lies ranked it 47th. In 2021, members of Writers Guild of America West (WGAW) and Writers Guild of America, East (WGAE) voted its screenplay 79th in WGA's 101 Greatest Screenplays of the 21st Century (so far). In June 2025, the film ranked number 37 on The New York Times' list of "The 100 Best Movies of the 21st Century" and number 38 on the "Readers' Choice" edition of the list. In July 2025, it ranked number 56 on Rolling Stone's list of "The 100 Best Movies of the 21st Century."

=== Fanbase ===
The film has gained a large international fan base. During its festival run, people crossed borders and oceans to be among the first to see the film. In 2018, Barb Mirell published a collection of stories from fans around the world about what the film meant to them. By early 2018, the film had attracted a following in China among heterosexual women, who saw it as a Western "boys' love" romance, evidenced by its popularity on the Chinese social network and media database Douban.

After an Italian fan published coordinates of the filming locations, visiting Crema became a pilgrimage for fans of the film. The city now offers official tours.

== Future ==
Guadagnino has deliberated over the idea of a sequel since the film's premiere at Sundance, when he said he realized the characters "could go beyond the boundaries of the film". In October 2017, he said he hoped to make a sequel in 2020 that might be in the style of François Truffaut's The Adventures of Antoine Doinel series, telling the story of Oliver and Elio as they age. "If I paired the age of Elio in the film with the age of Timothée, in three years' time, Timothée will be 25, as would Elio by the time the second story was set", he said. In the novel, Elio and Oliver reunite 15 years later when Oliver is married. Guadagnino said that, in the sequel, "I don't think Elio is necessarily going to become a gay man. He hasn't found his place yet ... I believe that he would start an intense relationship with Marzia again."

Guadagnino has expressed interest in the politics of the 1990s, saying, "It is the time of the fall of Communism and the start of the new world order and so-called 'end of history' that Francis Fukuyama established then ... the beginning of the Berlusconi era in Italy and it would mean dealing with the [first Gulf War] of Iraq." In November 2017, Guadagnino said he intended to make a series of five films in which the audience could "see those actors grow older, embodying those characters." A month later, he was reported to have begun writing a sequel that would reveal more about Oliver and resemble Michael Apted's Up series. Hammer and Chalamet have expressed interest in appearing in a sequel, but Ivory appears to be dismissive, saying of sequels, "that's fine, good. But I don't know how they're going to get a 40-year-old [Chalamet]!"

In January 2018, Guadagnino said the sequel would be set "right after the fall of Berlin Wall and that great shift that was the end of ... the USSR" and that its first scene could depict Elio watching Paul Vecchiali's Once More (1988)—the first French film to deal with AIDS—in a theater. In March 2018, Guadagnino said he would work with Aciman on the sequel, which would take place "five or six years" later with "a different tone". He also said that Hammer and Chalamet would reprise their roles with a different backdrop, where they "go around the world". Hammer said he was pitched the script by Guadagnino, saying: "it's not a finished script, but he's got all the ideas for it". In April 2018, Aciman said in an interview that he and Guadagnino were "not sure" about the sequel, saying Guadagnino "has quite a few projects in line and so do I. So we are flirting with each other about the sequel but I don't know if we are very serious." In July 2018, Stuhlbarg said that Guadagnino and Aciman were excited about the project and that the director was "serious" about it. He expressed enthusiasm to reprise his role, saying "I think it would have to be some kind of unique thing from what it was, but I would absolutely be game for trying." Two months later, Hammer said of the sequel in an interview: "It will happen because there are already people working on it and trying to make it happen."

In an October 2018 interview, Chalamet compared the sequel to Richard Linklater's Boyhood (2014) and said that Hammer, Aciman, and Guadagnino all intended to return for the next film. Also that month, Guadagnino said he had asked Dakota Johnson, a frequent collaborator of his, to play Oliver's wife in the sequel. He described her character as "a New England kind of hoochie woman" who might also have children with Oliver. He said the film would be "a new chapter in a chronicle" about the characters, rather than a sequel, and might take some time to develop due to his busy schedule: "I have not been able to luxuriate in anything but the promotion of Suspiria ... I didn't have space of mind and the real, actual time to put ideas on the table and think of things." "The only problem is the title", he said; "It cannot be Call Me by Your Name Two". At the SCAD Savannah Film Festival in October, Hammer said that Guadagnino had laid out a potential plot for the sequel and that it might be a few years away: "he wants to wait so that we age a bit more so that gap makes sense, kind of like a Linklater thing." In a November interview, Guadagnino said of the sequel, "It's a delicate flower that is blooming very slowly. And so I think it's not the time to collect it and put it into a vase."

In November 2018, Ivory said he would not return for a sequel and that Aciman thought "it was not a good idea". But less than a week later, Aciman said he was in fact writing a sequel. The novel, Find Me, was officially confirmed in March 2019 and was released on October 29 by Farrar, Straus and Giroux. Also in March 2019, Hammer said the film was not formally in the works and that he had had no explicit conversations with either Chalamet or Guadagnino about it. He also felt the potential sequel might not match the expectation, saying, "It felt like a really perfect storm of so many things, that if we do make a second one, I think we're setting ourselves up for disappointment. I don't know that anything will match up to the first ... I'm like, 'That was such a special thing, why don't we just leave it alone?'"

In March 2020, Guadagnino confirmed a sequel film in an interview and said the original film's full cast would return. He also said he was due to meet with an unnamed American writer to discuss the sequel, a meeting postponed due to the COVID-19 pandemic. In a September interview, Hammer said: "I've been talking to [Guadagnino], but we haven't got into it. I haven't even read the book. I know Luca hasn't got a full script yet, although he knows what he wants to do with the story, so I don't know how similar or dissimilar it will be to Find Me, the novel. I know if we end up doing it, it's more important for me to focus on Luca's vision than to focus on Find Me."

A series of allegations against Hammer of emotional abuse and cannibalistic fetishism in 2021, which he has denied, resulted in Hammer's removal from nearly all upcoming projects, raising doubts about the prospects of a sequel. Despite this, Stuhlbarg said he hoped the film would still be made. In May 2021, Guadagnino suggested in an interview that a sequel was no longer in his priorities, hinting that, beyond the complications related to Hammer's scandal, he and Chalamet would be busy with other films in the near future, leading him to put the sequel aside.

== See also ==
- List of LGBTQ-related films
- List of oldest and youngest Academy Award winners and nominees – Youngest nominees for Best Actor in a Leading Role
