= Alberoni =

Alberoni may refer to

- Alberoni (Venezia), human settlement in Lido di Venezia, Italy
- Alberoni (surname), Italian surname
- Collegio Alberoni, Roman Catholic seminary located in Piacenza, Italy
- Ottagono Alberoni, island in the Venetian Lagoon, Italy

== See also ==
- Albergoni (disambiguation)
