= Palazzo Donati (formerly Albergoni, Vimercati) =

Historical building in Italy

Palazzo Donati (già Albergoni, Vimercati)
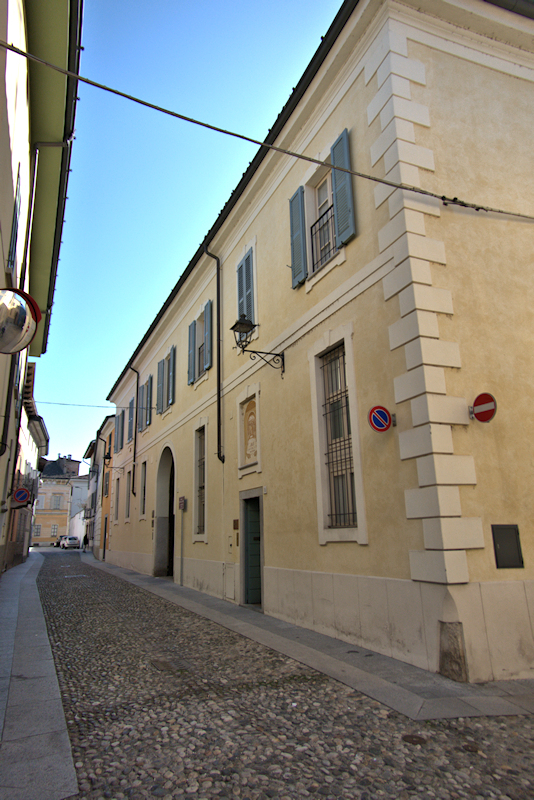
- View
- Alternative names: Donati De' Conti, Albergoni, Vimercati

General information
- Status: In use
- Type: Palace
- Location: Crema, Lombardy, Italy, 11 Via Vimercati
- Coordinates: 45.36132°N 9.68755°E
- Current tenants: private residence
- Construction started: 17th century

The Palazzo Donati De' Conti, formerly Albergoni, Vimercati, is a palace in Crema.

== History ==
The origins of the palace are unknown, but the documented history from the 17th century is characterised by frequent changes of ownership.

The first known information dates back to 1663 when Doctor Mario Albergoni, descendant of a family ennobled in 1519, lived in the property. Upon his death the property passed to his brother, Canon Camillo and from him to Cristoforo Zurla who married an Albergoni heiress, adding his wife's surname and giving life to the Zurla Albergoni branch.

Cristoforo's son, Marc’Antonio Maria, died childless in 1757 so the mansion was inherited by his second wife, Isabella Vimercati Sanseverino. When Isabella died in 1774, the palace passed to her brother Ferdinando who, the following year, sold it to Antonio Bislieri. He held it for very few years, selling it in 1781 to Giuseppe Vimercati; he too owned it only for a short time: in 1788 he sold it to Bartolomeo Bettinzoli.

From 1868 onwards, various owners alternated who used the palazzo for both residential and office purposes until reaching, in the 20th century, the Donati De' Conti.

== Characteristics ==
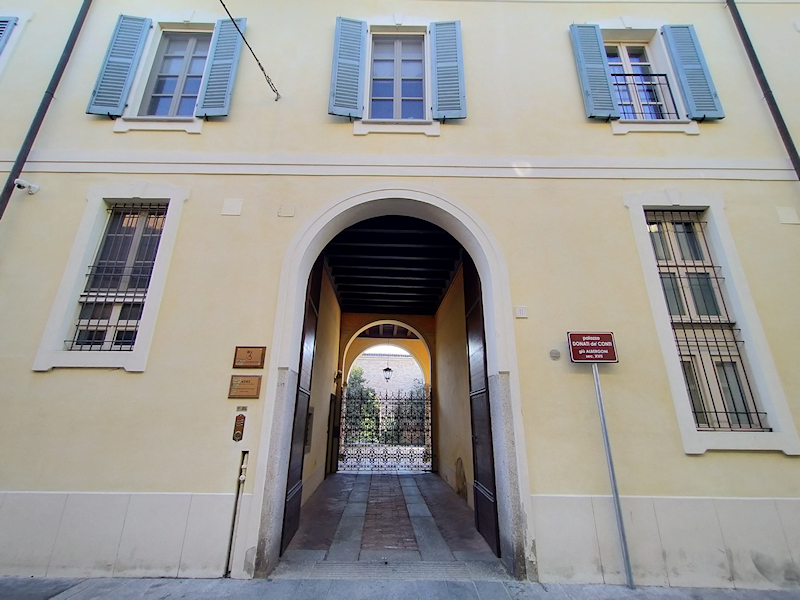
Front facing via Vimercati

The palace is composed of several bodies. The one facing Via Vimercati is very linear, arranged on two levels with a double string-course cornice and openings with simple cornices.

The entrance hall has flooring in terracotta tiles with trottatoie and wooden ceiling; along the right wall is a millstone walled in; the entrance leads to a portico with three forts with round arches and columns of Ionic order resting on stone plinths. Three windows rest on the stringcourse cornice.

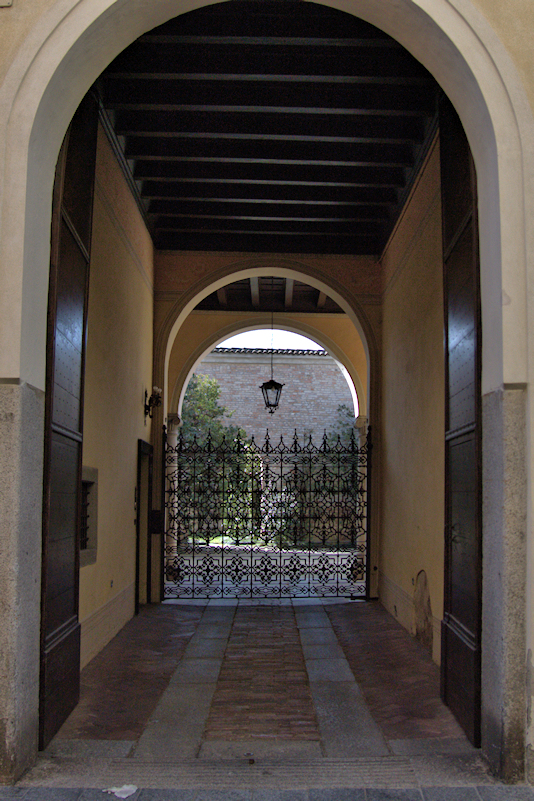
The hallway.

The eastern wing is the one containing the staircase that ascends to the upper floor with three flights and is illuminated by a helical window in the vault. It has a decorative ocentury apparatus with musical instruments, grotesques, real and fantasy animals, plants.

Beyond the courtyard, an opening leads to a garden nestled between surrounding buildings.

== See also ==
- Palazzo Donati (gia Benzoni, Bernardi, Vailati)

== Bibliography ==
=== Italian sources ===
- AA.VV., Cortili aperti, 2009.
- W. Terni De Gregori, Le antiche Vicinie di Crema, in «L'Italia Contemporanea», Crema, 1949, n. 9 p. 5.
- M. Perolini, Vicende degli edifici monumentali e storici di Crema, 1975, pp. 377–378.
- M. Perolini, Vicende degli edifici monumentali e storici di Crema, 2 a ed. rivista dall'autore, Crema, 1995, pp. 397–398.
- R. Borio Di Tigliole – C. M. DeL Grande, Blasonario cremasco. Nobili e Notabili Famiglie della Città di Crema, Montichiari, 1999, pp. 37–38.
