= Giovanni Battista Alberoni =

Italian painter

Giovanni Battista Alberoni (March 31, 1703 – December 31, 1784) was an Italian painter, scenic designer, and engraver of the late-Baroque period, active in Bologna and Turin, mainly in quadratura painting. He died on New Years Eve 1784 at the age of 81.

== Biography ==
He trained initially under Ferdinando Galli-Bibiena. He engraved some of the pages for the architectural treatises of Galli-Bibiena. He was a member of the Accademia Clementina and died in Bologna. His membership in the academy started in 1762 and he was principe in 1780. For nearly 22 years, he labored for the House of Savoy and others in Turin and the Piedmont. In Turin, he was active in the quadratura decoration of the Royal Palace, and in decorations for works staged at the Royal Theater. He collaborated during these years with Giovanni Battista Crosato. He contributed to the dome of the church of the Consolata in Turin. In Bologna, he was commissioned by Senator Segni to decorate the ceiling of the Palazzo Facchini in Bologna. He completed the monochrome decoration of Chapel of Santa Rita da Cascia in the church of the San Giacomo Maggiore in Bologna.
