= Villa Albergoni =

Villa in Moscazzano, Italy

Coordinates: 45°17′30.42″N 9°41′3.79″E

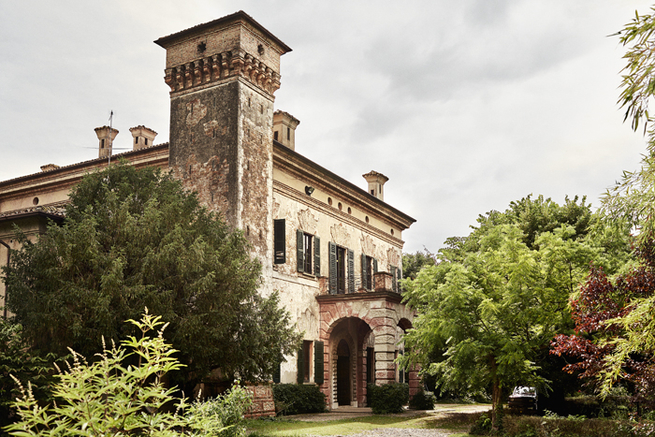
Villa Albergoni seen from the main entrance

Villa Albergoni is a villa (or country mansion) in Moscazzano, Cremona, Lombardy, northern Italy that dates back to the 16th-century. Due to previous owners, it is also known as Palazzo or Villa Vimercati, Villa Griffoni or Villa Sant'Angelo. It is located at 3, Via Montodine.

== History ==
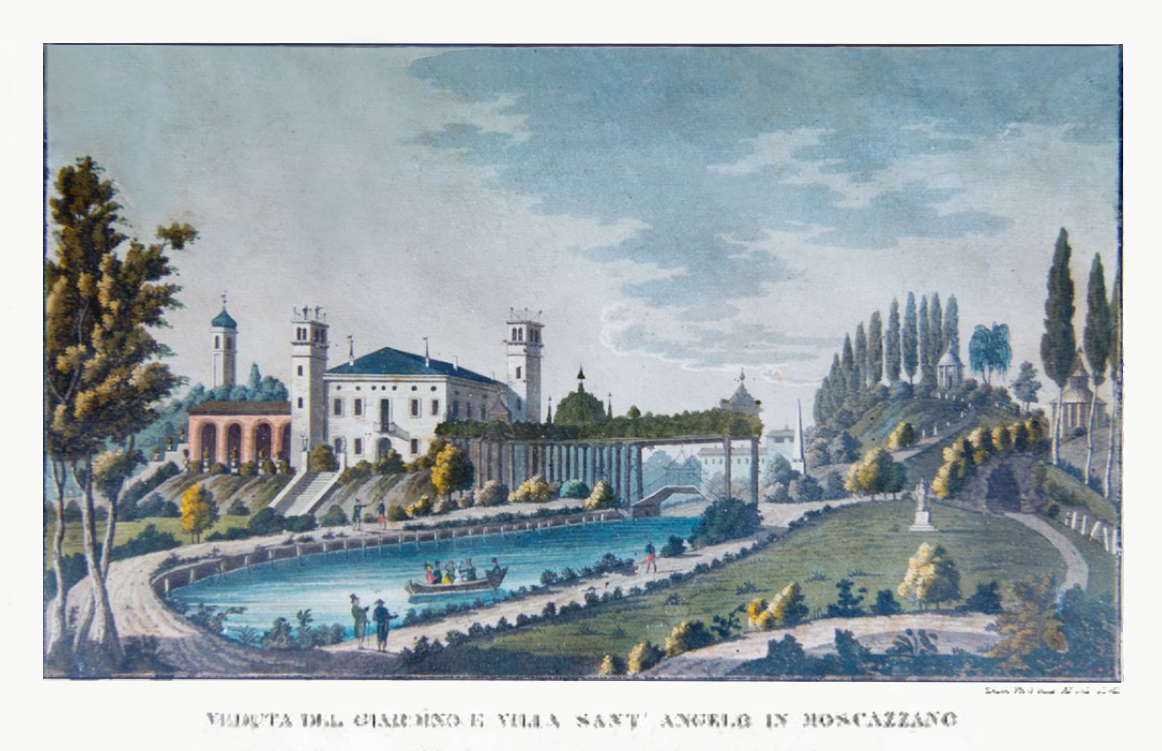
View of the gardens and the villa when it was owned by Count Angelo Griffoni Sant'Angelo (engraving c. 1820–1825, by Finoli Bassano)

Villa Albergoni is located on a plateau near the Adda river, in a marshy area that was politically difficult to control on the border between the Republic of Venice and the Duchy of Milan. The early document "Desegnio di Crema et del Cremasco", published in Venice between 1482 and 1497, describes Crema as a fortified village with crenelated houses and an isolated watchtower.

The powerful Milanese Vimercati family settled in Crema, probably in the 13th century, and the fiefdom of Moscazzano was entrusted in 1499. Around that time, the family probably also started to transform the ruins of a previous castle into a country residence. According to a map dating from around 1650, in the archive of the Marazzi family, the villa was designed with a cubic body and a four-pitched roof, but without the two current towers. Further renovations and rebuilding work took place in the next few centuries, notably in the 18th century when the villa got its main appearance. Angela Vimercati Sanseverino, daughter of the owners of the villa, married the Count of Griffoni Sant'Angelo and in 1776, the building became property of the Griffoni Sant'Angelo family. Further modernisation work was done in the interior. An engraving depicting the villa with the garden and the pond was made by Finoli Bassano in honour of Count Angelo Griffoni, who was owner from 1823 until his death in 1852. With his death, the Griffoni family became extinct in the male line.

The last restoration work was started by the entrepreneur Giuseppe Perletti, who purchased the villa in 1865. The works continued under his nephew Saverio Stramezzi, who became the subsequent owner. The west wing, including the passage corridor, was completely demolished, freeing the tower. Also demolished was the eastern wing, but the wing was later rebuilt in a reduced size. During this period, the building received its austere exterior. The garden was also simplified, due to cost.

In 1877, the villa came into the possession of the Stramezzi family until 1958. In 1961, Pirro Albergoni and his wife Corinna Emanueli became the new owners.

== Architecture ==
Villa Albergoni is set in two hectares (4.9 acres) and includes annexed minor buildings. The main part of the villa has a square plan with a front portico on the north side and two towers situated at the corners; on the east side of the building is a service wing that was added in the 19th century. The main building has 1,400 square metres (15,000 sq ft); it has 14 rooms and 7 bathrooms, spread out on the ground floor and first floor, with an attic under the roof. The main façade is characterized by a portico, above which is a terrace accessible from the first floor. The wooden entrance door is coffered with central roses. Inside the villa is a large entranceway with a barrel-vaulted ceiling and terrazzo floor, which goes to the back of the building. On either sides are the main hall, the library and two other rooms, and in the middle is the main staircase. The main hall has a frescoed ceiling; other rooms also have frescoes, some of which were done in the 16th century by Aurelio Busso, a student of Raphael. Both the main hall and the library have carved stone fireplaces and terrazzo floors.

The first floor of the main building has a layout similar to that of the ground floor, with a large central hallway and four large rooms with private bathrooms and a smaller room. The rooms have timber-coffered ceilings and parquet floors. The cellar is located in the centre of the villa; it is accessible by the main staircase.

The two annexed buildings are the house of the steward on the west side of the property, and to the left of the main gate is a minor building that was used by the guard.

== In popular culture ==
The villa served as the main set in the Academy Award-winning film Call Me by Your Name (2017). The interior was decorated for the film by Violante Visconti di Modrone, a relative of Luchino Visconti.

== See also ==
- Palazzo Arrigoni Albergoni in Crema
