= Attilio Albergoni =

Italian researcher and writer

- Born: Attilio Albergoni; January 31, 1949; Palermo, Sicily, Italy
- Occupations: Military researcher, novelist
- Writing career
- Period: 1949
- Genre: history
- Website: www.albergoni.net

Attilio Albergoni (January 31, 1949) is an Italian researcher and writer whose work focuses on the Italian military and the city of Palermo during the 1930s and 1940s.

== Career ==
He has held various positions, such as Cultural Director of the Photographic Section of the Museum of the Sea – Arsenal Borbonico Palermo, President of SIPBC (Italian Society for the Protection of Cultural Heritage) section of Sicily, and he is currently President of the Associazione Culturale. In recent years, he has supervised the preparation of photographic exhibitions, documentaries (even abroad), written books and articles for newspapers and magazines, and he has spoken at meetings and conferences.

In 1998, at the Museum of the Sea of Palermo, he established a Section on photography with the catalog, the "VI Biennale Internazionale del Mare in Castel dell'Ovo in Naples. In 2000, he published a book called "Tales of Palermo'43". In 2001, he was the curator of the exhibition of scientific photography, the documentary "The Italian Navy in the first half of the '900', held at the arsenal of the Royal Navy Borbonica – Museo del Mare di Palermo. In 2003, he was the scientific curator of the photographic exhibition, documentary "Beyond any time", at the 60th anniversary of the bombing on May 9, 1943, of the city of Palermo. From November 2003 to February 2004, the Giornale di Sicilia (Sicily Daily) published a weekly series of 30 posters and articles titled "The wings of Palermo" with images of ancient and modern aircraft, designed in collaboration with the architect Cesare Calcara. On December 18, 2004, for the types of SIGMA Editor, he published the book "Palermo Images of Memory: 1937 to 1947 – Anthology of a Decade", which is co-author with the architect Vincenzo Crisafulli. In December 2006, he published a CD-Rom interactive book "Military architectures strongholds in the territory of Palermo", which was the history of Italian military strongholds during the Second World War. In 2008, he published a book of short stories, called "The Puparo of Marina Square, which were stories of Sicily (Carabinieri Reali) in the early 1940s.

== Bibliography ==
=== Novels ===
- Racconti palermitani del 43 (novels) (2000)
- Il puparo di piazza Marina (2008)

=== WWII ===
- La Marina Militare Italiana nella prima metà del '900. (2001)
- Palermo, Images of Memory: 1937 to 1947 - Anthology of a Decade (2004)
- Military architectures strongholds in the territory of Palermo (2006)
- La Prefettura di Palermo tra potere centrale e realtà locale 1930 – 1940 (2007)
- Guida alle Postazioni Militari e Batterie Antiaeree nel territorio di Palermo 1940 – 1943 (2010)
- 1937 Le Grandi Manovre in sicilia dell'Anno XV (2010)
- Palermo, Images of Memory 1937 to 1947 - Anthology of a Decade Vol II (2014)
- La Guerra dell'Arte. Bombing history over Palermo and the destruction of fine arts and monuments. (2017)
- 1937 Opere Pubbliche in Sicilia. (2020)
- Mason Hammond - La guerra in Sicilia di un professore di Harvard. (2021) History in Sicily of an Adviser AMGOT of Fine arts and Monuments in the 1937.
