= Shareholder ownership value =

Finance theory

Shareholder ownership value (SOV) is a financial theory that developed internationally after the subprime mortgage crisis.
It started at the Wharton School of the University of Pennsylvania by financier Paolo G. Alberoni at the time an MBA Candidate, published in 1994 on the Wharton journal.

The SOV theory argues there is a validity limit of William F. Sharpe's CAPM. CAPM fails to incorporate in the WACC the decision power of majority shareholder (owner) that can affect the destination of the company/assets cash flows. The theory moves his base considering shareholder's power and total cost of ownership.

In the paper, Alberoni shows evidence and structures a referenced framework demonstrating how the Stock exchange prices fails to capture the full value of assets in the long term and therefore undervalues them in the long run. Whilst in takeover there is a "premium paid" to majority shareholders vs minority shareholders. This Majority premium is essentially connected to the ability of the Majority Shareholder to influence how cash flows are used in the company

The evidence has been gathered as follow: under common wisdom a company that dismisses real assets and leases them back gets benefits from tax breaks, better liquidity, etc. The SOV theory looks back and shows that "assets free" companies are more vulnerable to extreme shocks and have recorded performance in line with "asset loaded" companies in the same field. Therefore, there must be a "missing part" in the original valuation.

The paper highlights how companies with assets in the long term can outperform and overcome economic and financial downturns, and are able to provide "real return" in excess of inflation with reduced volatility relative to asset free companies (who in a broad sense demand to shareholders to create a strategy for the cash flows generated by the sales of assets).
