= Palazzo Donati (formerly Benzoni, Bernardi, Vailati) =

Palazzo Donati (già Benzoni, Bernardi, Vailati)
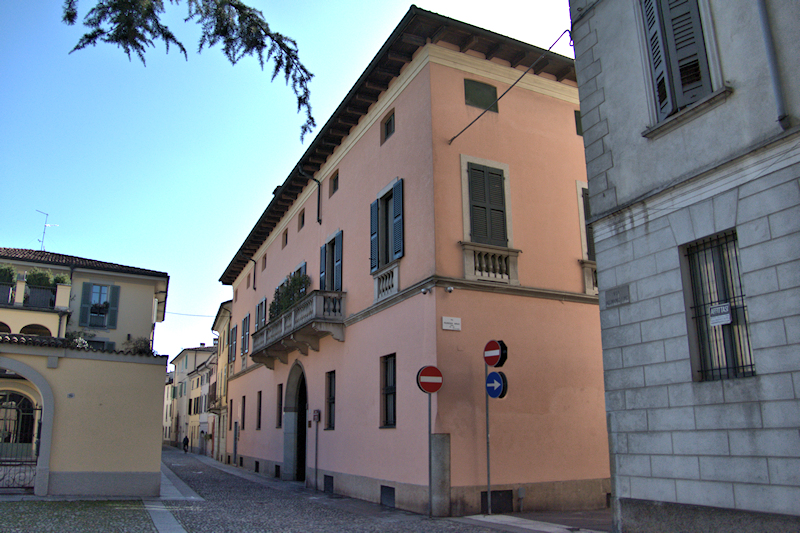
- View
- Alternative names: Donati De’ Conti, Benzoni, Bernardi

General information
- Status: In use
- Type: Palace
- Location: Crema, Lombardy, Italy, Via Alemanio Fino
- Coordinates: 45.36068°N 9.68673°E
- Current tenants: private residence
- Construction started: 15th–16th century

The Palazzo Donati De' Conti, formerly Benzoni, Bernardi, Vailati, is a private historical residence in Crema.

== History ==
Although the first information on the existence of this dwelling dates back to the end of the 16th century, the building undoubtedly has older origins: this is demonstrated by the coat of arms placed above a capital of the interior porch, which can be traced back to the branch of Giorgio Benzoni (Lord of Crema between 1405 and 1423), which features an erect lion with a sword and a mastiff, while the other branches of the family heraldry lack the feline.

In the Stato d’anime of the parish of San Giacomo in the year 1595, Antonio Benzoni, a descendant of Giorgio's own branch, was listed as living there with his wife Bianca Maria Placentia.

The last Benzoni was Chiara, who before the year 1631 married Coriolano Bernardi, successor to a family whose ancestors included Pope Eugene III.

The Bernardi family lived in this building until 1822; in 1824 Laura Premoli, widow of Vailati, the last Vailati was Adelaide who died in 1915.

After a period in which a labour office was housed there (to which trade unions of migliolina inspiration belonged), the building was eventually purchased by the notary Francesco Donati De' Conti to whose heirs it still belongs.), the property was eventually purchased by the notary Francesco Donati De' Conti to whose heirs it still belongs.

== Features ==
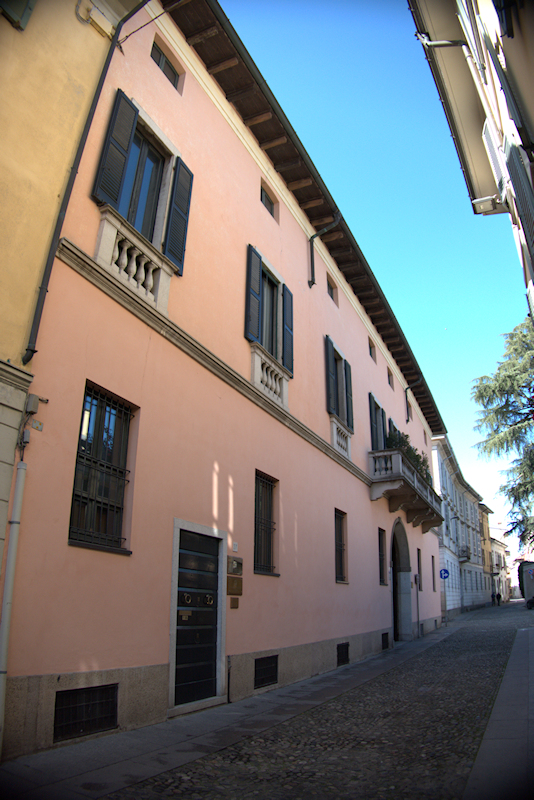
Facade

The building faces Via Alemanio Fino, presenting an off-centre entrance with a simple cornice.

The sober façade on two floors is softened by a balcony supported by shelves, with a balustrade whose stone columns are also taken up under all the French windows on the first floor.

Beyond the entrance hall paved with trottatoie is a portico with a coffered ceiling, three fornic with two columns of Ionic order whose capitals bear the coats of arms of the Benzoni and the Alfieri.

On the right side of the inner courtyard, as you enter, there is a more recent building erected in the 18th century. The east wing is 19th century, while the balconies were added during the 20th century.

The eighteenth-century staircase that rises to the upper floor with two flights is elegant: it has a sandstone balustrade and vaulted ceiling.

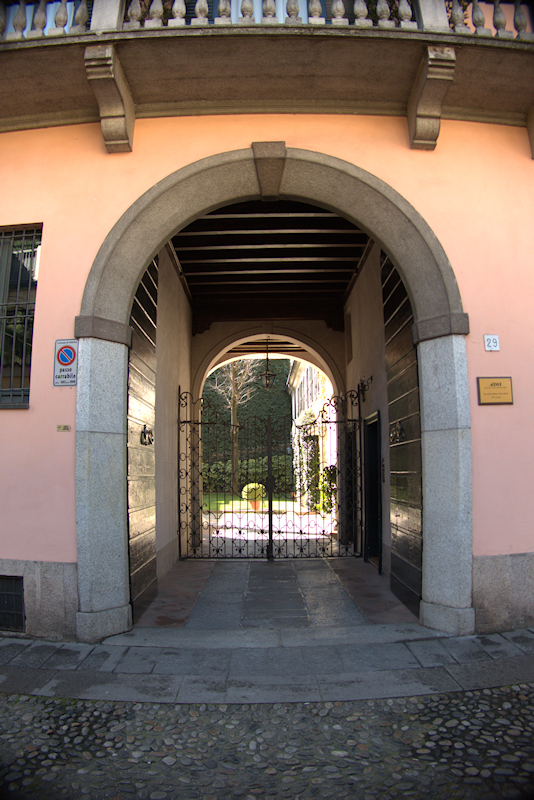
The portal and the entrance hall.

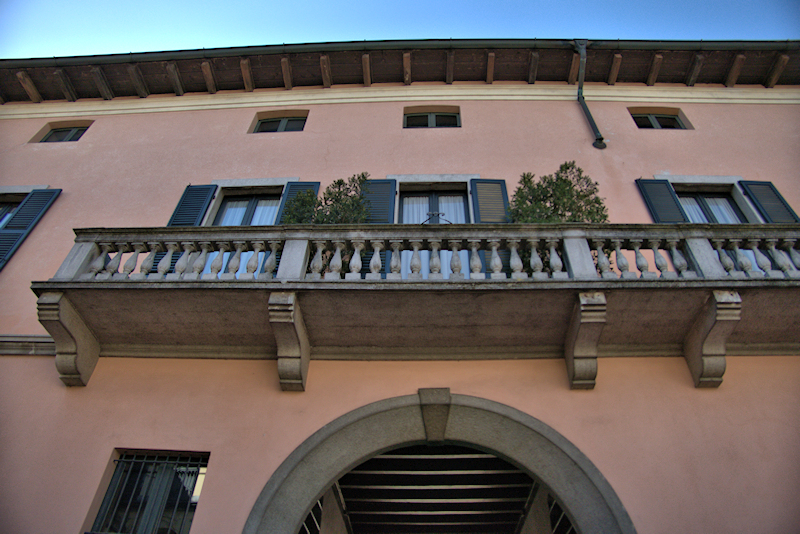
The long balcony.

== See also ==
- Palazzo Donati (gia Albergoni, Vimercati)

== Bibliography ==
=== Italian sources ===
- Mario Perolini, Vicende degli edifici monumentali e storici di Crema, in Insula Fulcheria VIII, 1969.
- Annamaria Piantelli, Crema, passeggiando guardando i palazzi, Pro Loco di Crema, 2010.
