= Albergoni family =

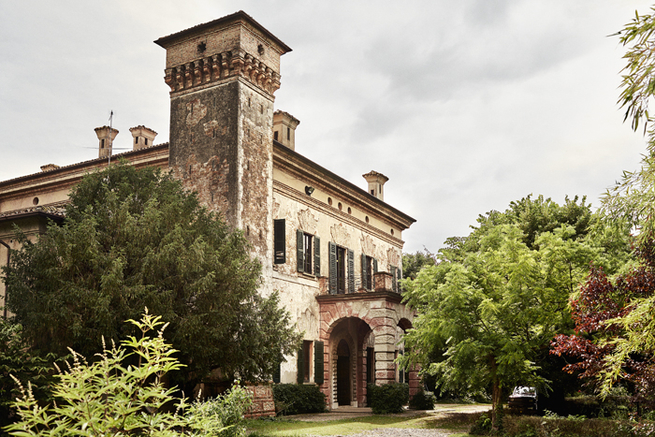
Villa Albergoni

The Albergoni (or Albrigoni/Albergone) family was an Italian noble family, which originated in Lombardy.

Their coat of arms was blue in the shield, featuring a golden lion and three stars above.

== History ==
The first known member of this family was Ortensio (or Guazzo/Guazzone) Albergoni and he is mentioned in 1189.

The family was first ennobled in 1519 in connection with Giovan Giacomo Albergoni being admitted to the General Consiglio in Crema.

== Zurla Albergoni ==
A short lived cadet branch of the family was created when Cristoforo Zurla married an Albergoni heiress, took his wife's surname thus creating the Zurla Albergoni branch. The couples son, Marc’Antonio Maria Zurla Albergoni, died childless in 1757.

== Notable members ==
- Lodovico Albergoni, acquittance of Casanova
