= National Society of Film Critics Award for Best Non-Fiction Film =

Annual US film award

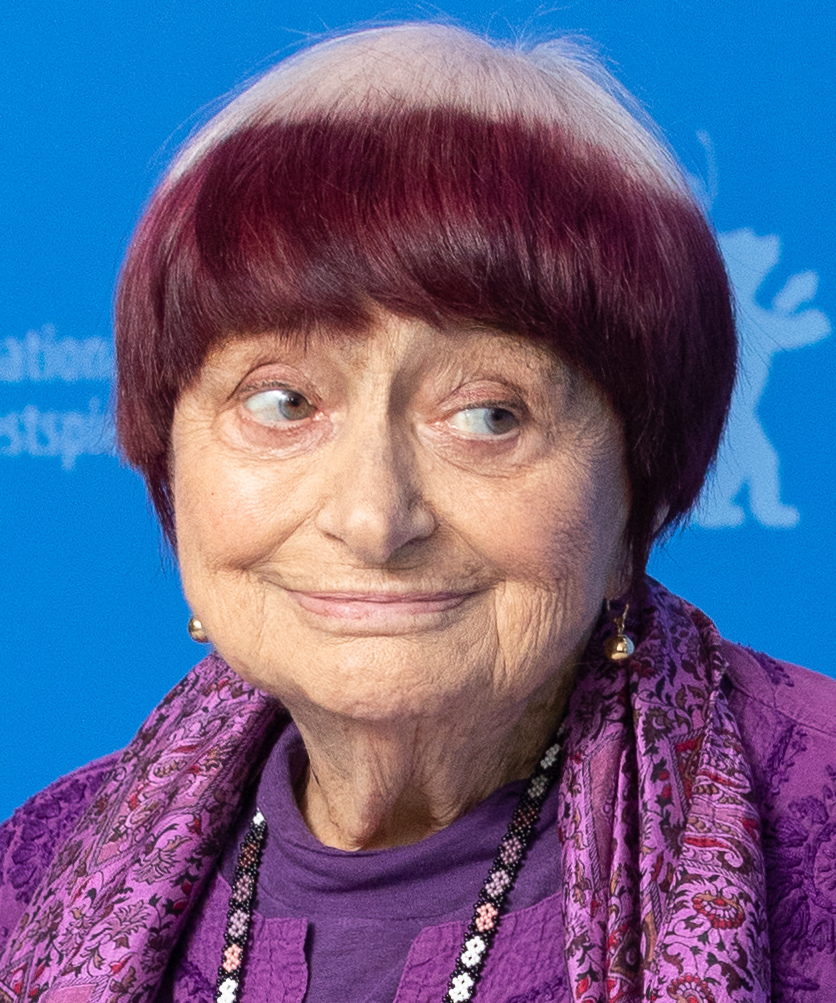
Director Agnès Varda at the Berlinale 201

The National Society of Film Critics Award for Best Non-Fiction Film is the award given for best feature documentary film at the annual National Society of Film Critics (NSFC) Awards. The category was introduced in 1985 and was originally named Best Documentary.

== List of winning films ==
Year (ceremony)	Film	Director(s)
1984 (19th)	Stop Making Sense	Jonathan Demme
1985 (20th)	Shoah	Claude Lanzmann
1986 (21st)	Marlene	Maximilian Schell
1987 (22nd)	N/A	
1988 (23rd)	The Thin Blue Line	Errol Morris
1989 (24th)	Roger & Me	Michael Moore
1990 (25th)	Berkeley in the Sixties	Mark Kitchell
1991 (26th)	Paris Is Burning	Jennie Livingston
1992 (27th)	American Dream	Barbara Kopple
1993 (28th)	Visions of Light	Arnold Glassman, Todd McCarthy and Stuart Samuels
1994 (29th)	Hoop Dreams	Steve James
1995 (30th)	Crumb	Terry Zwigoff
1996 (31st)	When We Were Kings	Leon Gast
1997 (32nd)	Fast, Cheap & Out of Control	Errol Morris
1998 (33rd)	The Farm: Angola, USA	Liz Garbus, Wilbert Rideau and Jonathan Stack
1999 (34th)	Buena Vista Social Club	Wim Wenders
2000 (35th)	The Life and Times of Hank Greenberg	Aviva Kempner
2001 (36th)	The Gleaners and I (Les glaneurs et la glaneuse)	Agnès Varda
2002 (37th)	Standing in the Shadows of Motown	Paul Justman
2003 (38th)	To Be and to Have (Être et avoir)	Nicolas Philibert
2004 (39th)	Tarnation	Jonathan Caouette
2005 (40th)	Grizzly Man	Werner Herzog
2006 (41st)	An Inconvenient Truth	Davis Guggenheim
2007 (42nd)	No End in Sight	Charles H. Ferguson
2008 (43rd)	Man on Wire	James Marsh
2009 (44th)	The Beaches of Agnès (Les plages d'Agnès)	Agnès Varda
2010 (45th)	Inside Job	Charles H. Ferguson
2011 (46th)	Cave of Forgotten Dreams	Werner Herzog
2012 (47th)	The Gatekeepers	Dror Moreh
2013 (48th)	The Act of Killing	Joshua Oppenheimer
2013 (48th)	At Berkeley	Frederick Wiseman
2014 (49th)	Citizenfour	Laura Poitras
2015 (50th)	Amy	Asif Kapadia
2016 (51st)	O.J.: Made in America	Ezra Edelman
2017	Faces Places (Visages Villages)	Agnès Varda and JR
2018	Minding the Gap	Bing Liu
2019 (54th)	Honeyland	Tamara Kotevska and Ljubomir Stefanov
2020	Time	Garrett Bradley
2021	Flee	Jonas Poher Rasmussen
2022	All the Beauty and the Bloodshed	Laura Poitras
2023 (58th)	Menus-Plaisirs – Les Troisgros	Frederick Wiseman
2024 (59th)	No Other Land	Basel Adra, Hamdan Ballal, Yuval Abraham, and Rachel Szor
2025 (60th)	My Undesirable Friends: Part I — Last Air in Moscow	Julia Loktev

== Multiple winners ==
- Agnès Varda - 3
- Werner Herzog - 2
- Errol Morris - 2
- Laura Poitras - 2
- Frederick Wiseman - 2

== See also ==
- Academy Award for Best Animated Feature
- Independent Spirit Award for Best Documentary Feature
