= List of accolades received by Spotlight =

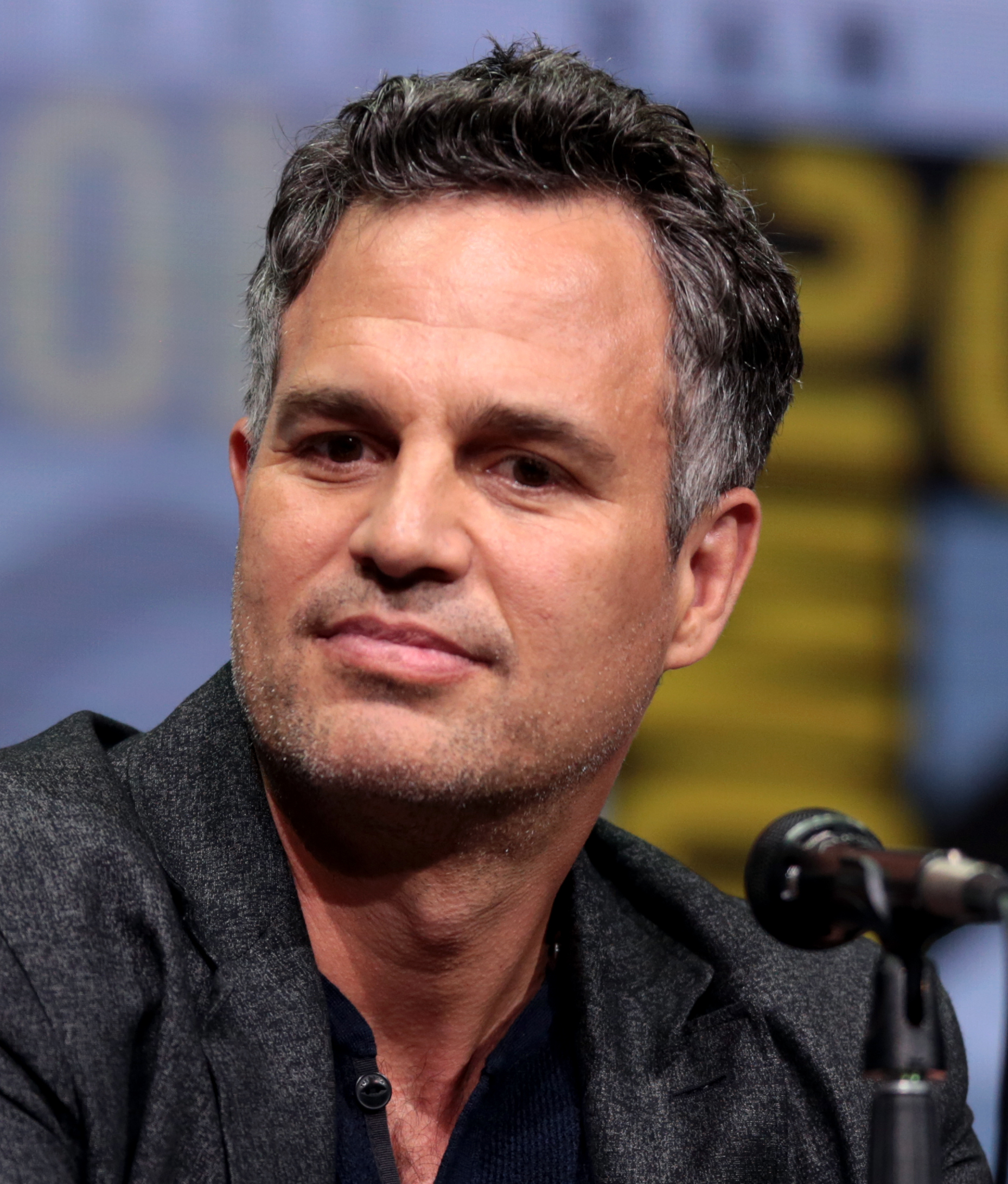
- Mark Ruffalo received critical acclaim for his portrayal of Michael Rezendes
Awards and nominations
Award	Won	Nominated
AACTA Awards	1	2
Academy Awards	2	6
Alliance of Women Film Journalists	4	5
American Film Institute Awards	1	1
Austin Film Critics Association Awards	0	3
Boston Society of Film Critics	3	3
Boston Society of Film Critics	2	3
British Academy Film Awards	1	3
Casting Society of America	0	1
Chicago Film Critics Association Awards	1	4
Chicago International Film Festival	1	1
Critics' Choice Movie Awards	3	8
Dallas-Fort Worth Film Critics Association Award	2	2
Detroit Film Critics Society Awards	2	5
Directors Guild of America Awards	0	1
Dorian Awards	0	3
Empire Awards	0	1
Florida Film Critics Circle	2	5
Golden Globe Awards	0	3
Golden Trailer Awards	2	4
Gotham Independent Film Awards	3	4
Hollywood Film Awards	1	1
Houston Film Critics Society Awards	2	4
Independent Spirit Awards	5	5
London Film Critics' Circle	1	3
Los Angeles Film Critics Association Awards	2	2
Mill Valley Film Festival	1	1
National Board of Review	1	1
National Society of Film Critics	2	3
New York Film Critics Circle	1	1
New York Film Critics Online Awards	4	4
Online Film Critics Society	1	4
Palm Springs International Film Festival	1	1
Producers Guild of America Awards	0	1
San Diego Film Critics Society	0	4
San Francisco Film Critics Circle Awards	1	3
Satellite Awards	4	7
Screen Actors Guild Awards	1	2
St. Louis Film Critics Association Awards	3	5
Toronto Film Critics Association	0	3
Toronto International Film Festival	0	1
Vancouver Film Critics Circle	1	2
Venice Film Festival	2	2
Washington D.C. Area Film Critics Association	2	3
Writers Guild of America Awards	1	1
- Total number of awards and nominations
Totals	69	134
- References

Spotlight is a 2015 American drama film directed by Tom McCarthy. The film, written by Josh Singer and McCarthy, follows The Boston Globe's "Spotlight" team and its investigation of sexual abuse in Boston. It stars Mark Ruffalo, Michael Keaton, Rachel McAdams, John Slattery, Brian d'Arcy James and Liev Schreiber. The film was premiered at the 72nd Venice International Film Festival on September 3, 2015, where McCarthy won the Brian Award. It was also screened at the 2015 Toronto International Film Festival, where it was the second runner-up for the People's Choice Award. Open Road Films released it theatrically in the United States on November 6, 2015. The film was a commercial success, grossing $98.7 million worldwide on a budget of $20 million.

On the review aggregator Rotten Tomatoes, Spotlight holds a rating of 97%, based on 335 reviews. The film has been nominated for 138 awards, winning 71; its direction, screenplay and the performances of Ruffalo and McAdams have received the most attention from award groups. Spotlight received six nominations at the 88th Academy Awards, including Best Director (McCarthy), Best Supporting Actor (Ruffalo) and Best Supporting Actress (McAdams). It won Best Picture and Best Original Screenplay (McCarthy and Singer), making it the first film since The Greatest Show on Earth (1952) to win in the Best Picture category with only one other award. The film garnered three Golden Globe Award nominations—Best Motion Picture – Drama, Best Director, and Best Screenplay. Spotlight also won the Best Original Screenplay award at the 69th British Academy Film Awards, where it received two additional nominations.

At the 22nd Screen Actors Guild Awards, McAdams was nominated for her supporting role and the film's cast received the Outstanding Performance award. It received an award in the same category at the 21st Critics' Choice Awards, in addition to winning Best Picture and Best Original Screenplay. Keaton won the New York Film Critics Circle Award for Best Actor at its 2015 ceremony. In addition, Spotlight was named the best film of the year by several critics associations, including the Boston Society of Film Critics Awards, Detroit Film Critics Society, and National Board of Review.

== Accolades ==
Award	Date of ceremony	Category	Recipient(s)	Result	Ref.
AACTA Awards	January 29, 2016	Best International Film	Spotlight	Nominated	
AACTA Awards	January 29, 2016	Best International Screenplay	Tom McCarthy and Josh Singer	Won	
Academy Awards	February 28, 2016	Best Picture	Blye Pagon Faust, Steve Golin, Nicole Rocklin, and Michael Sugar	Won	
Academy Awards	February 28, 2016	Best Director	Tom McCarthy	Nominated	
Academy Awards	February 28, 2016	Best Supporting Actor	Mark Ruffalo	Nominated	
Academy Awards	February 28, 2016	Best Supporting Actress	Rachel McAdams	Nominated	
Academy Awards	February 28, 2016	Best Original Screenplay	Tom McCarthy and Josh Singer	Won	
Academy Awards	February 28, 2016	Best Film Editing	Tom McArdle	Nominated	
Alliance of Women Film Journalists	January 13, 2016	Best Film	Spotlight	Won	
Alliance of Women Film Journalists	January 13, 2016	Best Director	Tom McCarthy	Won	
Alliance of Women Film Journalists	January 13, 2016	Best Original Screenplay	Tom McCarthy and Josh Singer	Won	
Alliance of Women Film Journalists	January 13, 2016	Best Ensemble Cast	Spotlight	Won	
Alliance of Women Film Journalists	January 13, 2016	Best Editing	Tom McArdle	Nominated	
American Film Institute	December 16, 2015	Top 10 Films	Spotlight	Won	
Austin Film Critics Association	December 29, 2015	Best Film	Spotlight	Nominated	
Austin Film Critics Association	December 29, 2015	Best Director	Tom McCarthy	Nominated	
Austin Film Critics Association	December 29, 2015	Best Original Screenplay	Tom McCarthy and Josh Singer	Nominated	
Boston Society of Film Critics	December 6, 2015	Best Film	Spotlight	Won	
Boston Society of Film Critics	December 6, 2015	Best Screenplay	Tom McCarthy and Josh Singer	Won	
Boston Society of Film Critics	December 6, 2015	Best Ensemble	Spotlight	Won	
BAFTA Awards	February 14, 2016	Best Film	Blye Pagon Faust, Steve Golin, Nicole Rocklin and Michael Sugar	Nominated	
BAFTA Awards	February 14, 2016	Best Supporting Actor	Mark Ruffalo	Nominated	
BAFTA Awards	February 14, 2016	Best Original Screenplay	Tom McCarthy and Josh Singer	Won	
Casting Society of America	January 4, 2016	Big Budget – Drama	Kerry Barden, John Buchan, Jason Knight, Carolyn Pickman, Joey Montenarello, Adam Richards and Paul Schnee	Nominated	
Chicago Film Critics Association	December 17, 2015	Best Picture	Spotlight	Nominated	
Chicago Film Critics Association	December 17, 2015	Best Director	Tom McCarthy	Nominated	
Chicago Film Critics Association	December 17, 2015	Best Original Screenplay	Tom McCarthy and Josh Singer	Won	
Chicago Film Critics Association	December 17, 2015	Best Editing	Tom McArdle	Nominated	
Chicago International Film Festival	October 24, 2015	Best Narrative English-Language Feature	Tom McCarthy	Won	
Critics' Choice Awards	January 17, 2016	Best Picture	Spotlight	Won	
Critics' Choice Awards	January 17, 2016	Best Director	Tom McCarthy	Nominated	
Critics' Choice Awards	January 17, 2016	Best Supporting Actor	Mark Ruffalo	Nominated	
Critics' Choice Awards	January 17, 2016	Best Supporting Actress	Rachel McAdams	Nominated	
Critics' Choice Awards	January 17, 2016	Best Acting Ensemble	Spotlight	Won	
Critics' Choice Awards	January 17, 2016	Best Original Screenplay	Tom McCarthy and Josh Singer	Won	
Critics' Choice Awards	January 17, 2016	Best Editing	Tom McArdle	Nominated	
Critics' Choice Awards	January 17, 2016	Best Score	Howard Shore	Nominated	
Dallas–Fort Worth Film Critics Association	December 14, 2015	Best Picture	Spotlight	Won	
Dallas–Fort Worth Film Critics Association	December 14, 2015	Best Screenplay	Tom McCarthy and Josh Singer	Won	
Detroit Film Critics Society	December 14, 2015	Best Film	Spotlight	Won	
Detroit Film Critics Society	December 14, 2015	Best Director	Tom McCarthy	Nominated	
Detroit Film Critics Society	December 14, 2015	Best Supporting Actor	Liev Schreiber	Won	
Detroit Film Critics Society	December 14, 2015	Best Screenplay	Tom McCarthy and Josh Singer	Won	
Detroit Film Critics Society	December 14, 2015	Best Ensemble	Spotlight	Won	
Directors Guild of America Awards	February 6, 2016	Outstanding Directorial Achievement in Feature Film for 2015	Tom McCarthy	Nominated	
Dorian Awards	January 19, 2016	Film of the Year	Spotlight	Nominated	
Dorian Awards	January 19, 2016	Director of the Year	Tom McCarthy	Nominated	
Dorian Awards	January 19, 2016	Screenplay of the Year	Tom McCarthy and Josh Singer	Nominated	
Empire Awards	March 20, 2016	Best Screenplay	Tom McCarthy and Josh Singer	Nominated	
Florida Film Critics Circle	December 23, 2015	Best Picture	Spotlight	Runner-up	
Florida Film Critics Circle	December 23, 2015	Best Director	Tom McCarthy	Nominated	
Florida Film Critics Circle	December 23, 2015	Best Supporting Actor	Mark Ruffalo	Nominated	
Florida Film Critics Circle	December 23, 2015	Best Screenplay – Original	Tom McCarthy and Josh Singer	Won	
Florida Film Critics Circle	December 23, 2015	Best Ensemble	Spotlight	Won	
Golden Globe Awards	January 10, 2016	Best Motion Picture – Drama	Spotlight	Nominated	
Golden Globe Awards	January 10, 2016	Best Director	Tom McCarthy	Nominated	
Golden Globe Awards	January 10, 2016	Best Screenplay	Tom McCarthy and Josh Singer	Nominated	
Golden Trailer Awards	May 6, 2016	Best of Show	Spotlight	Won	
Golden Trailer Awards	May 6, 2016	Best Independent	Spotlight	Won	
Golden Trailer Awards	May 6, 2016	Best Drama	Spotlight	Nominated	
Golden Trailer Awards	May 6, 2016	Best Music	Spotlight	Nominated	
Gotham Independent Film Awards	October 22, 2015	Best Feature	Spotlight	Won	
Gotham Independent Film Awards	October 22, 2015	Best Screenplay	Tom McCarthy and Josh Singer	Won	
Gotham Independent Film Awards	October 22, 2015	Audience Award	Spotlight	Nominated	
Gotham Independent Film Awards	October 22, 2015	Special Jury Award for Ensemble Performance	Spotlight	Won	
Hollywood Film Awards	November 1, 2015	Screenwriter of the Year	Tom McCarthy and Josh Singer	Won	
Houston Film Critics Society	January 9, 2016	Best Picture	Spotlight	Won	
Houston Film Critics Society	January 9, 2016	Best Direction of a Motion Picture	Tom McCarthy	Nominated	
Houston Film Critics Society	January 9, 2016	Best Performance by an Actor in a Supporting Role	Mark Ruffalo	Nominated	
Houston Film Critics Society	January 9, 2016	Best Screenplay	Tom McCarthy and Josh Singer	Won	
Independent Spirit Awards	February 27, 2016	Best Feature	Spotlight	Won	
Independent Spirit Awards	February 27, 2016	Best Director	Tom McCarthy	Won	
Independent Spirit Awards	February 27, 2016	Best Screenplay	Tom McCarthy and Josh Singer	Won	
Independent Spirit Awards	February 27, 2016	Best Editing	Tom McArdle	Won	
Independent Spirit Awards	February 27, 2016	Robert Altman Award	Tom McCarthy, Kerry Barden, Paul Schnee, Michael Cyril Creighton, Billy Crudup, Paul Guilfoyle, Neal Huff, Brian d'Arcy James, Michael Keaton, Rachel McAdams, Mark Ruffalo, Liev Schreiber, Jamey Sheridan, John Slattery and Stanley Tucci	Won	
London Film Critics' Circle	January 17, 2016	Film of the Year	Spotlight	Nominated	
London Film Critics' Circle	January 17, 2016	Supporting Actor of the Year	Michael Keaton	Nominated	
London Film Critics' Circle	January 17, 2016	Screenwriter of the Year	Tom McCarthy and Josh Singer	Won	
Los Angeles Film Critics Association	December 6, 2015	Best Film	Spotlight	Won	
Los Angeles Film Critics Association	December 6, 2015	Best Screenplay	Tom McCarthy and Josh Singer	Won	
Mill Valley Film Festival	October 8–18, 2015	Best U.S. Feature Film	Tom McCarthy	Won	
National Board of Review	December 1, 2015	Top Ten Films	Spotlight	Won	
National Society of Film Critics	January 3, 2016	Best Picture	Spotlight	Won	
National Society of Film Critics	January 3, 2016	Best Screenplay	Tom McCarthy and Josh Singer	Won	
National Society of Film Critics	January 3, 2016	Best Director	Tom McCarthy	Runner-up	
New York Film Critics Circle	December 2, 2015	Best Actor	Michael Keaton	Won	
New York Film Critics Online Awards	December 6, 2015	Best Picture	Spotlight	Won	
New York Film Critics Online Awards	December 6, 2015	Best Director	Tom McCarthy	Won	
New York Film Critics Online Awards	December 6, 2015	Best Screenplay	Tom McCarthy and Josh Singer	Won	
New York Film Critics Online Awards	December 6, 2015	Best Ensemble Cast	Spotlight	Won	
Online Film Critics Society	December 13, 2015	Best Picture	Spotlight	Nominated	
Online Film Critics Society	December 13, 2015	Best Director	Tom McCarthy	Nominated	
Online Film Critics Society	December 13, 2015	Best Supporting Actor	Mark Ruffalo	Nominated	
Online Film Critics Society	December 13, 2015	Best Original Screenplay	Tom McCarthy and Josh Singer	Won	
Palm Springs International Film Festival	January 1–10, 2016	Sonny Bono Visionary Award	Tom McCarthy	Won	
Producers Guild of America Awards	January 23, 2016	Best Theatrical Motion Picture	Blye Pagon Faust, Steve Golin, Nicole Rocklin, and Michael Sugar	Nominated	
San Diego Film Critics Society	December 14, 2015	Best Picture	Spotlight	Nominated	
San Diego Film Critics Society	December 14, 2015	Best Director	Tom McCarthy	Nominated	
San Diego Film Critics Society	December 14, 2015	Best Original Screenplay	Tom McCarthy and Josh Singer	Nominated	
San Diego Film Critics Society	December 14, 2015	Best Ensemble	Spotlight	Nominated	
San Francisco Film Critics Circle	December 13, 2015	Best Picture	Spotlight	Won	
San Francisco Film Critics Circle	December 13, 2015	Best Director	Tom McCarthy	Nominated	
San Francisco Film Critics Circle	December 13, 2015	Best Original Screenplay	Tom McCarthy and Josh Singer	Runner-up	
Satellite Awards	February 21, 2016	Best Film	Spotlight	Won	
Satellite Awards	February 21, 2016	Best Director	Tom McCarthy	Won	
Satellite Awards	February 21, 2016	Best Supporting Actor	Michael Keaton	Nominated	
Satellite Awards	February 21, 2016	Best Supporting Actor	Mark Ruffalo	Nominated	
Satellite Awards	February 21, 2016	Best Supporting Actress	Rachel McAdams	Nominated	
Satellite Awards	February 21, 2016	Best Original Screenplay	Tom McCarthy and Josh Singer	Won	
Satellite Awards	February 21, 2016	Best Original Score	Howard Shore	Nominated	
Satellite Awards	February 21, 2016	Best Cast in a Motion Picture	Spotlight	Won	
Screen Actors Guild Awards	January 30, 2016	Outstanding Performance by a Female Actor in a Supporting Role	Rachel McAdams	Nominated	
Screen Actors Guild Awards	January 30, 2016	Outstanding Performance by a Cast in a Motion Picture	Spotlight	Won	
St. Louis Film Critics Association	December 21, 2015	Best Film	Spotlight	Won	
St. Louis Film Critics Association	December 21, 2015	Best Director	Tom McCarthy	Won	
St. Louis Film Critics Association	December 21, 2015	Best Supporting Actor	Mark Ruffalo	Nominated	
St. Louis Film Critics Association	December 21, 2015	Best Original Screenplay	Tom McCarthy and Josh Singer	Won	
St. Louis Film Critics Association	December 21, 2015	Best Editing	Tom McArdle	Nominated	
Toronto Film Critics Association	December 14, 2015	Best Picture	Spotlight	Runner-up	
Toronto Film Critics Association	December 14, 2015	Best Director	Tom McCarthy	Runner-up	
Toronto Film Critics Association	December 14, 2015	Best Screenplay, Adapted or Original	Tom McCarthy and Josh Singer	Runner-up	
Toronto International Film Festival	September 10–20, 2015	People's Choice Award	Spotlight	3rd Place	
Vancouver Film Critics Circle	December 21, 2015	Best Film	Spotlight	Won	
Vancouver Film Critics Circle	December 21, 2015	Best Screenplay	Tom McCarthy and Josh Singer	Nominated	
Venice Film Festival	September 2–12, 2015	Brian Award	Tom McCarthy	Won	
Venice Film Festival	September 2–12, 2015	Silver Mouse	Tom McCarthy	Won	
Washington D.C. Area Film Critics Association	December 7, 2015	Best Film	Spotlight	Won	
Washington D.C. Area Film Critics Association	December 7, 2015	Best Original Screenplay	Tom McCarthy and Josh Singer	Nominated	
Washington D.C. Area Film Critics Association	December 7, 2015	Best Ensemble	Spotlight	Won	
Writers Guild of America Awards	February 13, 2016	Best Original Screenplay	Tom McCarthy and Josh Singer	Won	

== See also ==
- 2015 in film
