= New York Film Critics Circle Award for Best Non-Fiction Film =

American film award

- Country: United States
- Presented by: Critics Choice Association
- First award: 1998
- Currently held by: My Undesirable Friends: Part I — Last Air in Moscow (2025)
- Website: www.criticschoice.com

The New York Film Critics Circle Award for Best Non-Fiction Film is the award given for best feature documentary film at the annual New York Film Critics Circle Awards. The category was originally named Best Documentary and was awarded as such between 1980 and 1996. In 1997 it was discontinued and in 1998 it was relaunched under its current name.

== List of winning films ==
=== Best Documentary (1980–1997) ===
Year	Winner	Director(s)
1980	Best Boy	Ira Wohl
1984	The Times of Harvey Milk	Rob Epstein
1985	Shoah	Claude Lanzmann
1986	Marlene	Maximilian Schell
1988	The Thin Blue Line	Errol Morris
1989	Roger & Me	Michael Moore
1991	Paris Is Burning	Jennie Livingston
1992	Brother's Keeper	Joe Berlinger and Bruce Sinofsky
1993	Visions of Light	Arnold Glassman, Todd McCarthy, and Stuart Samuels
1994	Hoop Dreams	Steve James
1995	Crumb	Terry Zwigoff
1996	When We Were Kings	Leon Gast
1997	Fast, Cheap & Out of Control	Errol Morris

=== Best Non-Fiction Film (1998–present) ===
Year	Winner	Director(s)
1998	The Farm: Angola, USA	Liz Garbus, Wilbert Rideau, and Jonathan Stack
1999	Buena Vista Social Club	Wim Wenders
2000	The Life and Times of Hank Greenberg	Aviva Kempner
2001	The Gleaners and I	Agnès Varda
2002	Standing in the Shadows of Motown	Paul Justman
2003	Capturing the Friedmans	Andrew Jarecki
2004	Fahrenheit 9/11	Michael Moore
2005	Grizzly Man	Werner Herzog
2005	The White Diamond	Werner Herzog
2006	Deliver Us from Evil	Amy J. Berg
2007	No End in Sight	Charles H. Ferguson
2008	Man on Wire	James Marsh
2009	Of Time and the City	Terence Davies
2010	Inside Job	Charles H. Ferguson
2011	Cave of Forgotten Dreams	Werner Herzog
2012	The Central Park Five	Ken Burns, David McMahon, and Sarah Burns
2013	Stories We Tell	Sarah Polley
2014	Citizenfour	Laura Poitras
2015	In Jackson Heights	Frederick Wiseman
2016	O.J.: Made in America	Ezra Edelman
2017	Faces Places	Agnès Varda and JR
2018	Minding the Gap	Bing Liu
2019	Honeyland	Tamara Kotevska and Ljubomir Stefanov
2020	Time	Garrett Bradley
2021	Flee	Jonas Poher Rasmussen
2022	All the Beauty and the Bloodshed	Laura Poitras
2023	Menus-Plaisirs – Les Troisgros	Frederick Wiseman
2024	No Other Land	Basel Adra
2025	My Undesirable Friends: Part I — Last Air in Moscow	Julia Loktev
