= A Couple =

- Release poster illustrated by Catherine Meurisse
- Directed by: Frederick Wiseman
- Screenplay by: Frederick Wiseman; Nathalie Boutefeu
- Produced by: Frederick Wiseman; Karen Konicek
- Starring: Nathalie Boutefeu
- Cinematography: John Davey
- Edited by: Frederick Wiseman
- Production companies: Wat Films; Zipporah Films
- Distributed by: Météore Films (France)
- Release dates: 2 September 2022 (Venice); 19 October 2022 (France); 11 November 2022 (US)
- Running time: 64 minutes
- Countries: France; United States
- Language: French
- Box office: $18,334

A Couple (French: Un couple) is a 2022 French-language drama film directed by Frederick Wiseman. Featuring a solo performance by Nathalie Boutefeu as Sophia Tolstaya, the wife of Leo Tolstoy, the film consists of her monologues, which Wiseman and Boutefeu adapted from Tolstaya's letters and diaries. It is Wiseman's first narrative film since The Last Letter (2002), and his first ever that is shot on location rather than being a filmed play.

== Production ==
After working on a French-language production of The Belle of Amherst, Wiseman and Boutefeu developed the script based on Tolstaya's writings. The film was shot on Belle-Île off the coast of Brittany.

== Release ==
A Couple premiered in competition at the 79th Venice International Film Festival in September 2022. It screened at the New York Film Festival in October 2022, and received a theatrical release at Film Forum in New York City in November 2022.

== Reception ==
On review aggregator website Rotten Tomatoes, the film holds an approval rating of 87%, based on 31 reviews, and an average rating of 7.1/10. On Metacritic, the film has a weighted average score of 74 out of 100, based on 13 critics, indicating "generally favorable" reviews.
