= Law and Order (1969 film) =

- Directed by: Frederick Wiseman
- Written by: Frederick Wiseman
- Produced by: Frederick Wiseman
- Cinematography: William Brayne
- Edited by: Frederick Wiseman
- Production companies: Osti Films; The Ford Foundation
- Distributed by: National Educational Television
- Release date: March 2, 1969 (NET)
- Running time: 81 minutes
- Country: United States
- Language: English

Law and Order is a 1969 documentary film directed, written, shot, produced and edited by Frederick Wiseman. It was Wiseman's third film after Titicut Follies (1967) and High School (1968). The films were among the earliest examples of direct cinema by an American filmmaker.

It follows the daily routine of officers of the Kansas City Police Department, and was initially shown on National Educational Television (NET) (predecessor to the PBS in the United States). In 1969, Wiseman was awarded with the Emmy Award for Outstanding Achievement in News Documentary Programming.

== Synopsis ==
The film follows the members of the Kansas City Police Department, who are largely white, as they engage in daily patrol activities, interacting with members of the public. The scope of their activities is broad, ranging from bringing a lost child to the police station to making arrests. In one scene, a white plainclothes officer puts a black prostitute in a chokehold, doing so with such force that her tongue juts out of her mouth.

== Production ==
To create the film, which was shot in 1968, the filmmakers accompanied police officers in patrol cars as they responded to a variety of calls, ranging from domestic incidents to an armed robbery and a lost child. The film documents racial tensions between the police and local residents, and also records the officers complaining to each other as well as engaging in brutality. Wiseman spent over 400 hours accompanying officers in the patrol cars in making the film. The New York Times said that "his 'method,' as he might very well describe it, is simply to 'hang around.'"

Wiseman began work on the film a few weeks after the 1968 Democratic Convention in Chicago, in which there were violent clashes between Chicago police and demonstrators. He originally intended it "as a chance to do in the pigs." But in a 1970 interview he said that "after about two days of riding around in police cars, I realized my little stereotype was far from the truth, at least in Kansas City. The cops did some horrible things but they also did some nice things." Wiseman said that "we liberals frequently forget that people do terrible violence to each other, against which the police form a minimal and not very successful barrier. I understand now the fear that cops live with. When we got back to the car after the last scene, where one cop disarms three holdup men, his hand was shaking as he lit a cigarette."

Wiseman did not believe that being filmed had an impact on the behavior of the people being filmed, saying that "If it did, the camera would become the great behavior‐change instrument of our time."

The film was broadcast on March 2, 1969, by NET's Public Broadcast Laboratory (PBL). Prior to the telecast, NET president John F. White, overruling PBL executive's decision, ordered that obscenities be cut from the audio track. The order resulted in a split between PBL and NET. Wiseman protested the decision.

== Critical reaction ==
At the time of a 2017 re-release, the New York Times described the film as "harrowing" and as being among the films that show "brutal and blunt" power. In such early Wiseman films, the newspaper said, "the black-and-white images are sometimes matched by a startling Manicheanism." It described the chokehold scene as a "dreadful, terrifying moment and, for this filmmaker, unusual in its viciousness. Generally, violence in Mr. Wiseman's work remains implied and attenuated, and more a matter of ordinary domination."

In a review of Law and Order, Pauline Kael wrote: "Many of us grow to hate documentaries in school, because the use of movies to teach us something seems a cheat – a pill disguised as candy – and documentaries always seem to be about something we're not interested in. But Wiseman's documentaries show what is left out of both fictional movies and standard documentaries that simplify for a purpose, and his films deal with the primary institutions of our lives."

== Awards and honors ==
Law and Order received an Emmy Award for Outstanding Achievement in News Documentary Programming.
