= In Jackson Heights =

- Film Poster
- Directed by: Frederick Wiseman
- Produced by: Karen Konicek; Frederick Wiseman
- Cinematography: John Davey
- Edited by: Frederick Wiseman
- Production company: Moulins Films
- Distributed by: Zipporah Films; PBS (USA) (TV)
- Release date: 4 September 2015 (Venice Film Festival)
- Running time: 190 minutes
- Countries: United States; France
- Languages: English; Spanish; Arabic; Hindi

In Jackson Heights is a 2015 documentary film about the community of Jackson Heights, Queens, New York City, directed by Frederick Wiseman. The film received widespread critical acclaim. In 2017, the film was considered the thirteenth "Best Film of the 21st Century So Far" by The New York Times.

== Synopsis ==
The film documents events in Jackson Heights, including "a Muslim school, a Jewish center, a meeting of gay and transgender people, a City Council office and the local headquarters of Make the Road New York, an activist organization dedicated to Latino and working-class people."

== Release ==
=== Critical response ===
In Jackson Heights has received positive reviews from critics. Review aggregator Rotten Tomatoes gives the film an approval rating of 95%, based on 39 reviews, with an average rating of 8.3/10. On Metacritic, the film has a score of 81 out of 100, based on 12 critics, indicating "universal acclaim".

In a review for the Los Angeles Times, Michael Phillips wrote, "True to Wiseman's form, In Jackson Heights contains no on-screen identification of camera subjects, no voice-over narration and little in the way of overt polemics. By the end, you arrive at the essential paradox found in every Wiseman portrait: a clear sense of just how cloudy our world and our environments have become." For The New York Times, Manohla Dargis wrote, "Wiseman’s latest documentary is a movingly principled, political look at a dynamic neighborhood in which older waves of pioneers make room for new, amid creeping gentrification."

In Peter Bradshaw's review for The Guardian, he called it "an engaging portrait—film-making which works from the ground up."

=== Accolades ===
Award	Subject	Nominee	Result
Chicago International Film Festival	Best Documentary	Frederick Wiseman	Nominated
Cinema Eye Honors	Outstanding Achievement in Direction	Frederick Wiseman	Nominated
Indiewire Critics' Poll	Best Documentary		3rd Place
International Cinephile Society Awards	Best Documentary		2nd Place
International Online Cinema Awards	Best Documentary	Frederick Wiseman	3rd Place
BFI London Film Festival	Documentary Film	Frederick Wiseman	Nominated
National Society of Film Critics Awards	Best Non-Fiction Film		2nd Place
New York Film Critics Circle Awards	Best Non-Fiction Film		Won
Venice International Film Festival	Queer Lion		Nominated
Village Voice Film Poll	Best Documentary		4th Place

=== Box office ===
As of 4 November 2016, the film has grossed $121,094 at the box office.
