= Ballet (film) =

- Directed by: Frederick Wiseman
- Produced by: Frederick Wiseman
- Starring: Julio Bocca; Alessandra Ferri; Susan Jaffe; Amanda McKerrow
- Cinematography: John Davey
- Edited by: Frederick Wiseman
- Distributed by: Zipporah Films
- Release date: March 22, 1995
- Running time: 170 minutes
- Country: United States
- Language: English

Ballet is a 1995 American documentary film directed by Frederick Wiseman.

== Summary ==
It portrays rehearsals, choreography, performances, business transactions, and other day-to-day life of the American Ballet Theatre. Much of the footage dates from the 1992 season. It also includes scenes from the company's European tour, namely in Athens and Copenhagen.

Appearances are made by Susan Jaffe, Julie Kent, Julio Bocca, Angel Corella, Amanda McKerrow, Alessandra Ferri and others. Various ballet masters and choreographers also appear, including Kevin McKenzie, ABT's artistic director, Ulysses Dove, Irina Kolpakova, Natalia Makarova and Agnes de Mille. Business transactions by then-director Jane Hermann are also included.

== Availability ==
The film is currently released to the public by Wiseman's distribution company, Zipporah Films
