= Race track (disambiguation) =

A race track is a purpose-built facility for the conducting of races.

Race track or racetrack may also refer to:

- Racetrack (1933 film), an American pre-Code drama
- Racetrack (1985 film), a documentary film directed by Frederick Wiseman
- Racetrack (game), a paper and pencil game
- Racetrack Higgins, vice president of the general union of the Newsboys' strike of 1899.
- Racetrack memory, a device for storing bits in a magnetic racetrack
- Racetrack Records, an American record label
- "Racetrack", a song by Beach Bunny from Honeymoon
- Stadium (geometry) a two dimensional shape seen in athletic or horse racing tracks

== Places in the United States ==
- Racetrack, Montana, a census-designated place
- Racetrack, North Bergen, a neighborhood in Hudson County, New Jersey
- Racetrack Playa, an area of moving rocks in Death Valley, California
- The Racetrack, a nickname for the BNSF Chicago Subdivision, a railroad line that runs from Chicago, Illinois to Aurora, Illinois

== See also ==
- RaceTrac, a discount brand of gasoline and chain of convenience stores situated across the United States
