= Hospital (1970 film) =

- Directed by: Frederick Wiseman
- Distributed by: NET
- Release date: 1970
- Running time: 84 minutes
- Country: United States

Hospital is an 84-minute 1970 American documentary film directed by Frederick Wiseman, which explores the daily activities of the people at Metropolitan Hospital Center, a large-city hospital in New York City, with emphasis on its emergency ward and outpatient clinics.

The film won two Emmy Awards for Outstanding Achievement in News Documentary Programming - Individuals and Outstanding Achievement in News Documentary Programming - Programs. In 1994, it was selected for preservation in the United States National Film Registry as being deemed "culturally, historically, or aesthetically significant". The film was selected for screening as part of the Cannes Classics section at the 2016 Cannes Film Festival.

== Plot ==
The film follows hospital staff and a variety of patients in an episodic manner. The film is highly observational, using no voice-over narration or interviews. No names are formally given, and the hospital is only mentioned once as "Metropolitan" by a doctor on a phone call. The patients come from a variety of ethnic backgrounds and social classes, but most are poor and marginalized. Doctors, nurses, police officers, and social workers attempt to aid patients with medical care and social welfare. The staff's actions are often compassionate but limited by an overwhelmed public system. Among the patients are a man who fears he has cancer, a neglected toddler who fell out a window, an art student who ingested an unknown drug and is suffering a bad trip, a gay, transsexual teenager trying to obtain welfare, and an elderly women who has a pulmonary embolism and is in critical condition. A group of patients attend a Catholic mass as the closing sequence.

== See also ==
- List of American films of 1970
