= Public Housing (film) =

- Directed by: Frederick Wiseman
- Distributed by: Zipporah Films
- Release date: 4 October 1997
- Running time: 200 minutes
- Country: United States
- Language: English

Public Housing is a 1997 American documentary film directed by Frederick Wiseman. It records the daily life in the Ida B. Wells public housing development in Chicago, Illinois.
