= Juvenile Court (1973 film) =

Juvenile Court is a 1973 documentary film directed by Frederick Wiseman. It explores a juvenile court and detention center located in Memphis, Tennessee.
