= Central Park (1990 film) =

1990 documentary film

Central Park is a 1990 documentary film directed, produced, and edited by Frederick Wiseman.

Shot over several months in 1988, the film provides an observational study of Central Park in New York City, portraying it as a complex social and municipal institution. Utilizing the direct cinema style, Wiseman explores the park's diverse range of public activities alongside the extensive administrative and physical labor required to maintain the space. Upon its release, the film received critical acclaim for its structural editing and its depiction of the park as a microcosm of New York City's social and economic layers.

== Synopsis ==
Shot in the summer of 1988, Central Park explores the 840-acre Manhattan landmark as a complex social institution. The film documents a wide range of public activities, including weddings, foot races, the 1988 Gay and Lesbian Pride Parade, and a performance by Luciano Pavarotti.

Beyond recreation, Wiseman focuses on the labor and administrative politics required to maintain the park's "natural" appearance. The film includes meetings of the Central Park Conservancy and the Department of Parks and Recreation where officials discuss fundraising, security, and maintenance tasks such as stone-laying and graffiti removal. The documentary also captures brief appearances by then-Mayor Ed Koch and filmmakers Francis Ford Coppola and Vittorio Storaro during the filming of New York Stories.

== Style ==
Consistent with Wiseman's signature direct cinema style, this three-hour observational documentary contains no voiceover narration, title cards, or interviews. The film relies on rhythmic editing and immersive, candid footage to portray the park as a microcosm of New York City's social and economic layers. Across different seasons and occasions, viewers experience the 840-acre sanctuary through its diverse inhabitants and activities, ranging from weddings, concerts, and sports to political protests and the routine maintenance work performed by park staff.

== Reception ==
Critics have characterized the documentary as a portrait of a "man-made and man-tended" wilderness, with Vincent Canby of The New York Times noting that it captures the ongoing struggle to maintain social order within the urban environment. Writing for The New York Review of Books, David Denby described the film as "uncharacteristically sensuous," praising Wiseman's "structural inventiveness" in organizing the park's fragmented activities into a unified narrative. Beyond its role as an urban oasis for leisure, the film highlights the complex administrative and physical labor required to sustain the massive public space as a functional institution.
