= Welfare (film) =

1975 film by Frederick Wiseman

- Film poster
- Directed by: Frederick Wiseman
- Produced by: Frederick Wiseman
- Cinematography: William Brayne
- Edited by: Frederick Wiseman
- Production company: Zipporah Films
- Distributed by: Public Broadcasting Service
- Release date: 1975
- Running time: 167 minutes
- Country: United States
- Language: English

Welfare is a 1975 film directed by Frederick Wiseman.

== Summary ==
It examines the welfare system in the United States, from the viewpoint of both officials and claimants.

== Reception and legacy ==
Welfare is considered by film critics to be Wiseman's masterpiece.
