= State Legislature (film) =

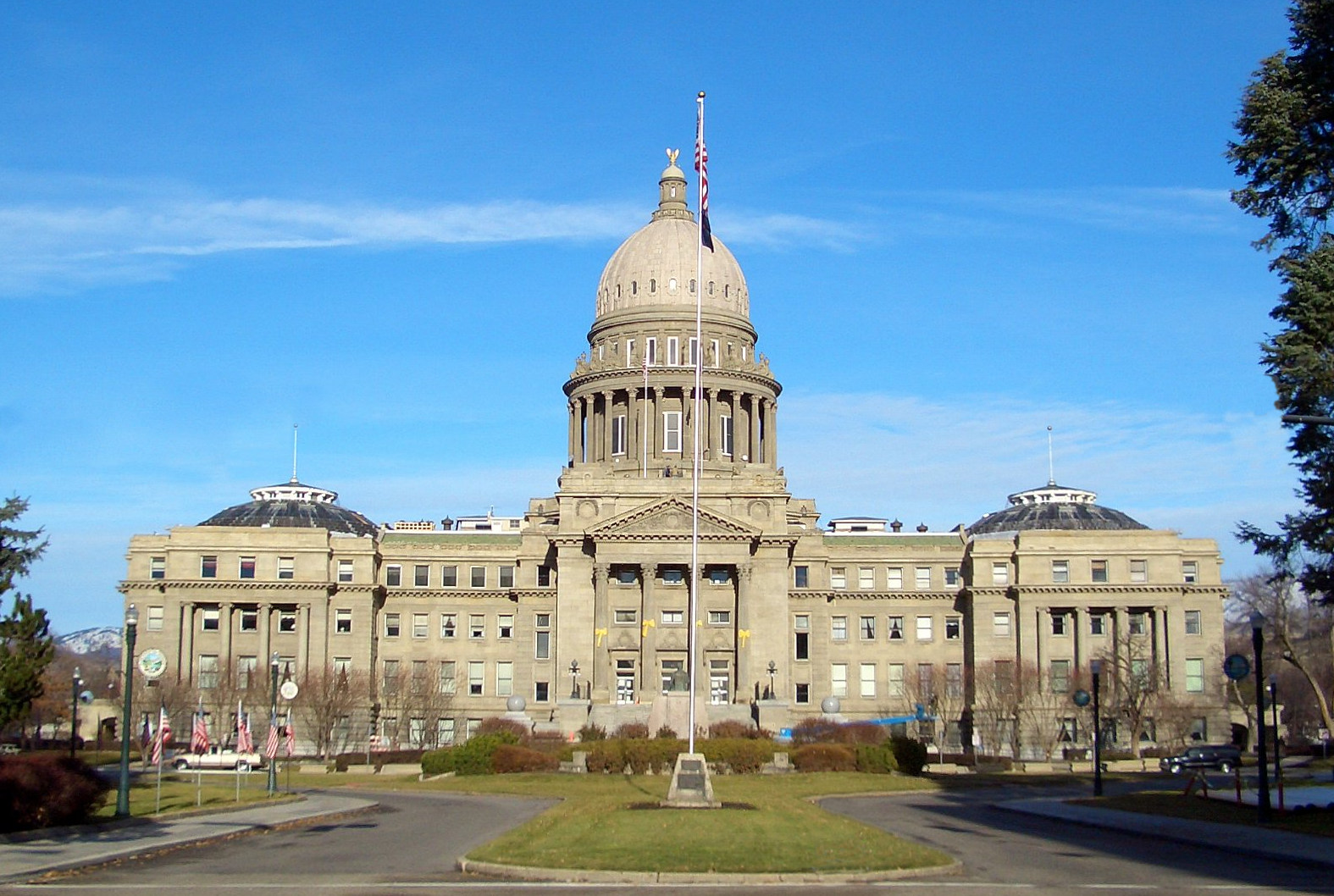
- State capitol building in Boise, Idaho
- Directed by: Frederick Wiseman
- Produced by: Idaho Film Inc. Thirteen/WNET New York in association with ITVS
- Cinematography: John Davey
- Distributed by: Zipporah Films
- Release date: February 15, 2007
- Running time: 217 minutes
- Country: United States
- Language: English

State Legislature is a 2007 American documentary film directed by Frederick Wiseman. It details the workings of the Idaho Legislature. Wiseman filmed for a total of 160 hours over a full 12-week session of the legislature, later editing his content down to a 3 ½ hour film. Wiseman was interested in the topic as a way to show one of the more basic political systems in America at work. It was first broadcast on PBS in June 2007.
