= Zoo (1993 film) =

Zoo is a 1993 documentary film by Frederick Wiseman which explores the Miami Metrozoo.
