= The Garden (2005 film) =

The Garden is a 2005 documentary film directed by Frederick Wiseman which explores Madison Square Garden, a sports and entertainment arena in New York City.

Wiseman pulled the film from the 2005 Sundance Film Festival, stating that there were "unresolved issues between me and Madison Square Garden."
