= Monrovia, Indiana (film) =

- Film poster by Casey Moore
- Directed by: Frederick Wiseman
- Produced by: Frederick Wiseman; Karen Konicek
- Cinematography: John Davey
- Edited by: Frederick Wiseman
- Production company: Civic Film
- Distributed by: Zipporah Films
- Release dates: September 4, 2018 (Venice); September 30, 2018 (United States)
- Running time: 143 minutes
- Country: United States
- Language: English

Monrovia, Indiana is a 2018 American documentary film edited, co-produced, and directed by Frederick Wiseman. The film documents daily life in the titular small farming community of Monrovia, Indiana. It premiered at the 75th Venice International Film Festival on September 4, 2018, and made its premiere in the United States on September 30, 2018, at the New York Film Festival.

== Synopsis ==
The film's official synopsis reads: "The film explores the conflicting stereotypes and illustrates how values like community service, duty, spiritual life, generosity and authenticity are formed, experienced and lived. The film gives a complex and nuanced view of daily life in Monrovia and provides some understanding of a rural, mid-American way of life that has always been important in America but whose influence and force have not always been recognized or understood in the big cities on the east and west coasts of America and in other countries."

The film's story is delivered with only the voices and sounds of the community captured while filming each scene. There is no musical soundtrack or overdubbed narration during the entire movie.

== Reception ==
=== Box office ===
As of November 11, 2018, the film has grossed an estimated $36,334 in the United States since its theatrical release on October 26, 2018.

=== Critical reception ===
On review aggregator website Rotten Tomatoes, the film holds an approval rating of 84% based on 62 reviews, and an average rating of 7.7/10. The website's critical consensus reads, "Monrovia, Indiana finds Frederick Wiseman observing the citizens of one small American town with his typically patient—and ultimately revealing—approach." On Metacritic, the film has a weighted average score of 79 out of 100, based on 18 critics, indicating "generally favorable reviews".

A.O. Scott of The New York Times praised the film, calling Wiseman "the greatest American poet" and noting that the release's proximity to the 2016 United States presidential election "is hardly an idle or random decision, and the unavoidable political implications of Monrovia, Indiana give its observations an undeniable urgency." Mike D'Angelo of The A.V. Club criticized the film for not being directly political given its historical context, calling it "maddeningly evasive" and "so resolutely ordinary that it threatens to cross the line into outright dull."
