= Boxing Gym =

2010 film

- Film poster
- Directed by: Frederick Wiseman
- Produced by: Frederick Wiseman
- Starring: Richard Lord
- Cinematography: John Davey
- Edited by: Frederick Wiseman
- Production companies: Zipporah Films; KO Films
- Distributed by: Zipporah Films; Tuckman Media
- Release dates: May 20, 2010 (Cannes); October 22, 2010 (IFC Center)
- Running time: 91 minutes
- Country: United States
- Language: English

Boxing Gym is a 2010 American documentary film edited, produced, and directed by Frederick Wiseman. The film premiered at the 63rd Cannes Film Festival on May 20, 2010.

== Critical response ==
Boxing Gym received critical acclaim from critics. Manohla Dargis of The New York Times designated it an "NYT Critics Pick", and stated that "It's... easy to get swept up by the beats in the film because Mr. Wiseman, among the most celebrated direct-cinema practitioners, eschews voiceovers, talking-head interviews, extraneous footage and the customary and sometimes superfluous like." Rob Nelson of Variety also praised the film, noting that while it is shorter than most of Wiseman's works, "the viewer learns an enormous amount from [Boxing Gym,] but not at all in the conventional documentary manner", and instead through "images that put the audience in close contact with the boxers’ routines". Eric Kohn of IndieWire remarked that Wiseman's filmmaking method resulted in "an ethnographic snapshot of restless people in their natural habitat."
