= Domestic Violence (film) =

2001 film by Frederick Wiseman

- Directed by: Frederick Wiseman
- Produced by: Frederick Wiseman
- Cinematography: John Davey
- Edited by: Frederick Wiseman
- Production company: Zipporah Films
- Release date: September 4, 2001
- Running time: 196 minutes
- Country: United States

Domestic Violence is a 2001 American documentary film edited, produced, and directed by Frederick Wiseman. The film premiered on September 4, 2001 at the 58th Venice International Film Festival.

== Reception ==
On review aggregator website Rotten Tomatoes, the film holds an approval rating of 91% based on 11 reviews, with an average rating of 7.5/10.
