= Metropolitan Hospital Center =

Public hospital in New York City

- NYC Health + Hospitals
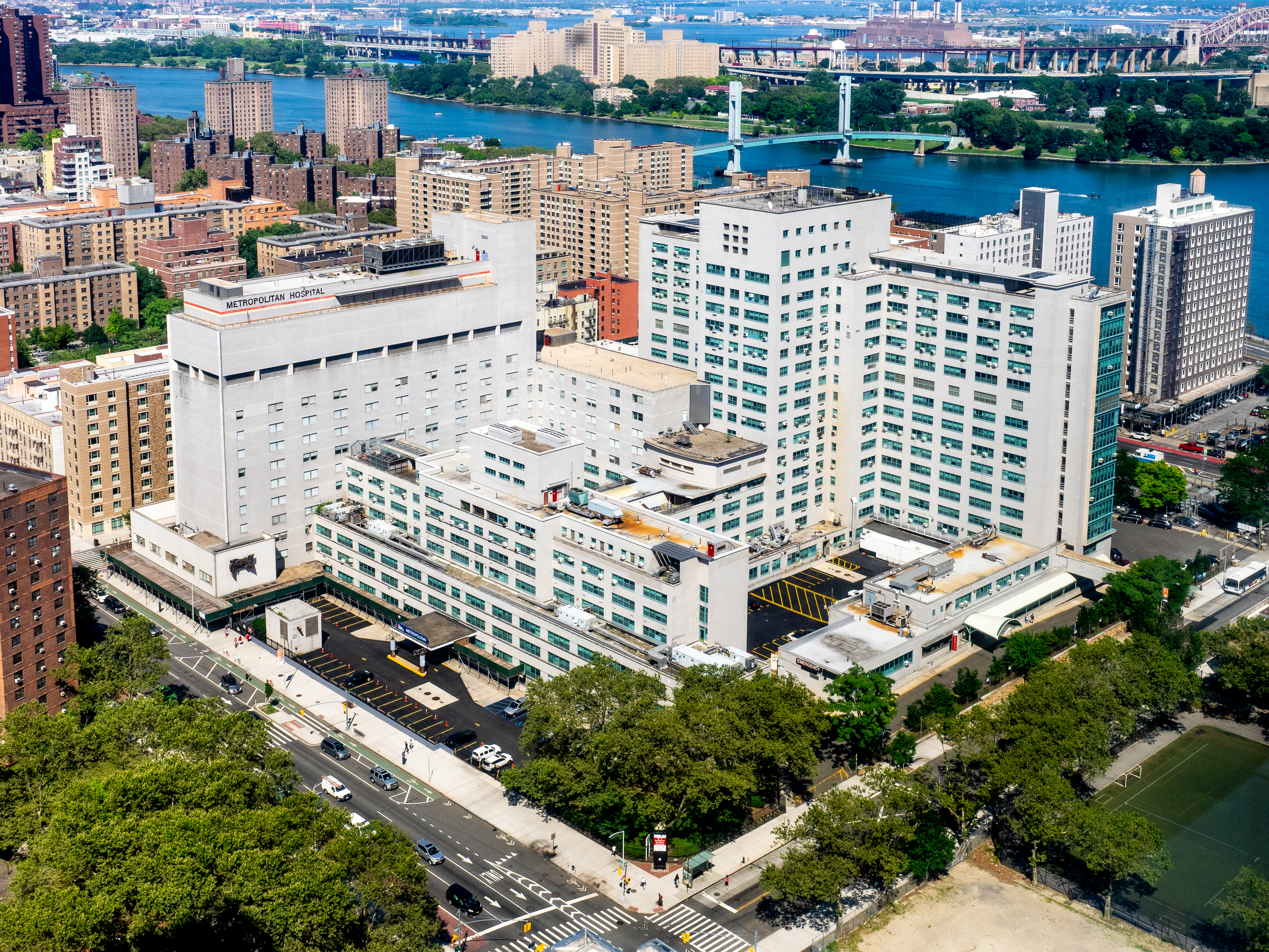

Geography
- Location: 1901 First Avenue; New York, New York, United States
- Coordinates: 40°47′5.74″N 73°56′40.94″W

Organization
- Care system: Public
- Type: Community
- Affiliated university: New York Medical College; New York College of Podiatric Medicine

Services
- Emergency department: Yes
- Beds: 330 (approximately)

History
- Former names: Homeopathic Hospital; Ward's Island Homeopathic Hospital
- Founded: 1875 (151 years ago) as the Homeopathic Hospital

Links
- Website: nyc.gov/mhc
- Lists: Hospitals in New York State
- Other links: Hospitals in Manhattan

The Metropolitan Hospital Center (MHC, also referred to as Metropolitan Hospital) is a hospital in the East Harlem neighborhood of New York City.

It has been affiliated with New York Medical College since it was founded in 1875, representing the oldest partnership between a hospital and a private medical school in the United States.

MHC is part of the New York City Health and Hospitals Corporation (HHC), the largest municipal hospital and healthcare system in the country.

== Location ==
Metropolitan is located near the border of East Harlem with Upper East Side and Yorkville. The physical plant extends from First to Second Avenue between East 97th and 99th Streets. The hospital caters to a wide spectrum of patient population and disease pathology.

=== Transportation ===
The 96th Street station of the Second Avenue Subway, one block from the hospital's entrance, is served by the New York City Subway's Q train. In addition, the M15, M15 SBS, M96, M98, M101, M102 and M103 of New York City Bus and the 96th Street of the subway's 6 and <6> trains serve the nearby neighborhood.

== History ==
Metropolitan Hospital Center was founded in September 1875 as the Homeopathic Hospital. It was established by the New York City Department of Public Charities and Correction on Wards Island. The island already had other hospitals dating to at least 1847. The new hospital was soon known as the Ward's Island Homeopathic Hospital.

In 1894, the hospital moved to Blackwell's Island (now Roosevelt Island). It occupied the former New York City Asylum for the Insane and was renamed Metropolitan Hospital.

The hospital moved into two newly constructed buildings at its present location in East Harlem in 1955. In 1966, the hospital added its Mental Health Building, an adjoining 14-story pavilion housing the hospital's psychiatric services.

In 1969, Frederick Wiseman filmed a documentary film, titled Hospital, using the hospital's emergency room. The film won two Emmy Awards – Outstanding Achievement in News Documentary Programming - Individuals; and Outstanding Achievement in News Documentary Programming. In 1994, the National Film Registry selected the film for preservation.

In 1971, the absurdist satirical black comedy film The Hospital, starring George C. Scott, was filmed in a psychiatric wing which was nearing completion.

In the 1980s, the hospital was threatened with closure due to funding cuts. New York City Mayor Ed Koch reached a $45 million, three-year agreement with the Department of Health and Human Services to develop a new project to demonstrate innovative ways of delivering health care to East Harlem's poor.

In 1995, the hospital was listed as having 607 beds.

== Designations ==
Metropolitan Hospital Center is the first hospital in East Harlem designated as a stroke center by the New York State Department of Health.

The hospital has been designated as a Sexual Assault Forensic Examination (SAFE) Center of Excellence by the New York State Department of Health. A Sexual Assault Response Team (SART) is also on location, composed of specially trained Sexual Assault Forensic Examiners, medical personnel, patient advocates, social workers, law enforcement officers (Special Victims Unit) and representatives of the New York County District Attorney's Office Sex Crimes Unit.
