= Meat (1976 film) =

Documentary film

Meat is a 1976 documentary film directed by Frederick Wiseman. It explores the operations of the Monfort meatpacking plant in Colorado.
