= Missile (film) =

1988 American documentary film directed by Frederick Wiseman

- Directed by: Frederick Wiseman
- Distributed by: PBS
- Release date: January 1988 (Sundance Film Festival)
- Running time: 115 minutes
- Country: United States
- Language: English

Missile is a 1988 American documentary film by Frederick Wiseman.

== Summary ==
It chronicles the 14-week training course for the men and women of the United States Air Force who are charged with manning the ICBM silos in remote places like Minot AFB and Whiteman AFB. The film shows discussions of the ethics of nuclear war, shows scenes from the daily lives of trainees, and shows demonstrations of training exercises such as counterterrorism, the launching of nuclear missiles, the command and control process, and basic military training. Most scenes in the film are of classroom training, interspersed with exercises in training facilities. The film includes a scene of an Air Force church service memorial for the astronauts killed in the Space Shuttle Challenger disaster.

== Production ==
In the typical style of Wiseman's films, the documentary is unadorned by commentary, narration, or music.
