= Belfast, Maine (film) =

1999 documentary by Frederick Wiseman

Belfast, Maine is a 1999 documentary film which explores the town of Belfast, Maine. It was directed by Frederick Wiseman.
