= Blind (1986 film) =

Blind is a 1986 documentary film that follows the daily lives and educational programs of students from kindergarten through 12th grade at the Alabama School for the Blind. It was directed by Frederick Wiseman.
