= Crazy Horse (2011 film) =

2011 film by Frederick Wiseman

Crazy Horse is a 2011 documentary film directed by Frederick Wiseman about Crazy Horse, a cabaret in Paris known for its stage shows performed by nude female dancers.

The film has an 85% rating on Rotten Tomatoes with 55 reviews.
