= Manoeuvre (1979 film) =

Documentary about tanks

Manoeuvre is a 1979 documentary film directed by Frederick Wiseman which follows an American infantry tank company as they participate in a NATO training exercise in West Germany.
