= High School II =

1994 film by Frederick Wiseman

High School II is a 1994 documentary film directed by Frederick Wiseman which explores the Central Park East Secondary School, an alternative high school in the East Harlem neighborhood of New York City.
