= City Hall (2020 film) =

2020 American documentary film

- Official poster
- Directed by: Frederick Wiseman
- Produced by: Frederick Wiseman; Karen Konicek
- Cinematography: John Davey
- Edited by: Frederick Wiseman
- Production companies: Puritan Films; PBS; ITVS; WGBH; JustFilms/Ford Foundation; Sundance Institute; Pershing Square Foundation; LEF Moving Image Fund
- Distributed by: Zipporah Films
- Release dates: September 8, 2020 (Venice); October 28, 2020 (United States)
- Running time: 272 minutes
- Country: United States
- Language: English

City Hall is a 2020 American documentary film directed, edited, and co-produced by Frederick Wiseman. It explores the government of Boston, Massachusetts.

The film had its world premiere at the 77th Venice International Film Festival on September 8, 2020. It was released through virtual cinema on October 28, 2020, by Zipporah Films, followed by a broadcast on PBS on December 22, 2020.

== Synopsis ==
The film explores the government of Boston, Massachusetts, from racial justice, housing, climate change action and more. Wiseman's documentaries do not have a standard narrative arc, narration, or interviews, but are based on observation of day-to-day organizational life, in this case the activities of Boston's city government in fall 2018 and winter 2019. Much of the film follows Mayor Marty Walsh in activities such as meetings with aides at City Hall, addressing business leaders about the impact of climate change on the Harbor, listening to veterans at Faneuil Hall on November 11, observing Thanksgiving Day at Goodwill Industries, and giving his state of the city address at Symphony Hall. A second major theme of the film is public servants helping people in need: the eviction prevention task force, another task force on economic advancement for Latina women, and an economic development adviser working with an ethnically focused grocery store.

On numerous instances the Mayor and public servants complain about the policies of the Trump Administration. In an interview done for the Toronto International Film Festival, Wiseman says, "I didn't set out to make an anti-Trump film... it becomes an anti-Trump film because the professionals, the mayor, and the people who work for city hall in Boston are people who care and believe in the democratic process and the democratic norms, and their work is an illustration of that. So that the film becomes—because of Trump's horrible behavior—it represents everything that he doesn't stand for."

== Release ==
The film had its world premiere at the 2020 Venice Film Festival on September 8, 2020. It also screened at the Toronto International Film Festival on September 14, 2020, and the New York Film Festival on September 25, 2020. The film was released through virtual cinema on October 28, 2020, by Zipporah Films. The film was broadcast on PBS in the United States on December 22, 2020.

== Reception ==
City Hall received positive reviews from most film critics. It holds a 98% approval rating on review aggregator website Rotten Tomatoes, based on 64 reviews, with an average of 8.7/10. The site's critical consensus reads, "A glimpse of local government at work that's as patiently observant as it is engrossing, City Hall adds another insightful gem to master documentarian Frederick Wiseman's filmography." On Metacritic, the film holds a rating of 88 out of 100, based on 17 critics, indicating "universal acclaim".

Cahiers du Cinéma named it the best film of 2020.
