= Time (2020 film) =

2020 documentary film by Garrett Bradley

- Promotional release poster
- Directed by: Garrett Bradley
- Produced by: Garrett Bradley; Kellen Quinn; Lauren Domino
- Starring: Sibil Fox Richardson; Robert G. Richardson
- Cinematography: Zac Manuel; Justin Zweifach; Nisa East
- Edited by: Gabriel Rhodes
- Music by: Jamieson Shaw; Edwin Montgomery
- Production companies: Concordia Studio; The New York Times; Outer Piece; Hedgehog Films
- Distributed by: Amazon Studios
- Release dates: January 25, 2020 (Sundance); October 9, 2020 (United States)
- Running time: 81 minutes
- Country: United States
- Language: English
- Budget: < $10 million

Time is a 2020 American documentary film produced and directed by Garrett Bradley. It follows Sibil Fox Richardson and her fight for the release of her husband, Rob, who was serving a 60-year prison sentence for engaging in an armed bank robbery.

The film had its world premiere at the Sundance Film Festival on January 25, 2020, where Bradley won the US Documentary Directing Award, the first African-American woman to do so. It was released theatrically on October 9, 2020, and digitally on Amazon Prime Video on October 16, 2020 by Amazon Studios. In addition to being nominated for Best Documentary Feature at the 93rd Academy Awards, it was also one of the few documentary films to ever sweep "The Big Four" critics awards (LA, NBR, NY, NSFC).

== Synopsis ==
The film follows Sibil Fox Richardson (also known as Fox Rich), an entrepreneur, self-described abolitionist, author, and mother of six, as she fights for the release of her husband, Rob, serving a 60-year prison sentence in the Louisiana State Penitentiary for his participation in an armed bank robbery. Rich served three and a half years for her role in the robbery while Rob was granted clemency by then-Louisiana governor John Bel Edwards in 2018 after he served 21 years in prison. The film combines original footage with home videos.

== Production ==
Bradley met Rich in 2016 while working on her short film Alone, a New York Times Op-Doc. She intended to make a short documentary about Rich, but when shooting wrapped, Rich gave Bradley a bag of mini-DV tapes containing some 100 hours of home videos she had recorded over the previous 18 years. At that point, Bradley developed the short as a feature.

Time was shot on a Sony FS7 camera in black and white. It was selected for the 2019 Sundance Documentary Edit & Story Lab. The score features original compositions by Jamieson Shaw and Edwin Montgomery, as well as music by Emahoy Tsegué-Maryam Guèbrou that was recorded in the 1960s. The film was produced by Lauren Domino, Kellen Quinn, and Bradley. Laurene Powell Jobs, Davis Guggenheim, Nicole Stott, Rahdi Taylor, and Kathleen Lingo are executive producers, Jonathan Silberberg and Shannon Dill are co-executive producers, and Dan Janvey is co-producer.

== Release ==
Time had its world premiere at the Sundance Film Festival on January 25, 2020. In February 2020, Amazon Studios acquired its distribution rights. It also screened at the New York Film Festival on September 20, 2020. It was released theatrically on October 9, 2020, and on Amazon Prime Video on October 16, 2020.

=== Home media ===
In March 2021, it was announced that Time, One Night in Miami... and Sound of Metal would receive DVD and Blu-Ray release by the Criterion Collection.

== Reception ==
=== Critical response ===
On review aggregator website Rotten Tomatoes, Time holds an approval rating of 98% based on 123 reviews, with an average rating of 8.5/10. The site's critics consensus reads: "Time delivers a powerful broadside against the flaws of the American justice system – and chronicles one family's refusal to give up against all odds." At Metacritic the film has a weighted average score of 91 out of 100, based on 23 critics, indicating "universal acclaim".

Peter Debruge of Variety wrote that the film "will almost certainly rewire how Americans think about the prison-industrial complex" as it "challenges the assumption that incarceration makes the world a safer place." Sheri Linden of The Hollywood Reporter called the film "gripping," describing it as a "concise and impressionistic account of love and waiting, of the American justice system and the fight to keep a family whole." David Ehrlich of Indiewire gave it an A− and wrote, "Bradley's monumental and enormously moving Time doesn't juxtapose the pain of yesterday against the hope of tomorrow so much as it insists upon a perpetual now. And while the documentary never reduces its subjects to mere symbols of the oppression they represent – the film couldn't be more personal, and it builds to a moment of such unvarnished intimacy that you can hardly believe what you're watching."

Justin Chang of the Los Angeles Times said the film is "a dazzling formal feat, but more than that, it's a profoundly sad movie about what it means to grow up without a father, to absorb that blow continually, day after day." Ashley Clark of Filmmaker magazine wrote that the film's "graceful compositions, flowing sonic landscape and at times breathtaking interpolation of Fox Rich's home video archive footage cohere to form a singularly powerful experience."

Kevin Jagernauth of The Playlist, however, stated that the film "wants the viewer to empathize with the very turmoil this family endured" yet felt that there were many gaps left unsolved (Robert turning down the plea bargain, Rich's nephew accompanying the robbery and so on).

In June 2025, IndieWire ranked the film at number 8 on its list of "The 100 Best Movies of the 2020s (So Far)."

=== Accolades ===
At the 2020 Sundance Film Festival, Bradley won the Directing Award in the U.S. Documentary competition, becoming the first African-American woman to win in that category. At the 2020 Full Frame Documentary Film Festival, the film won the Center for Documentary Studies Filmmaker Award and the Charles E. Guggenheim Emerging Artist Award. It won the James Blue Award at the 2020 Ashland Independent Film Festival.

Award	Date of ceremony	Category	Recipient	Result	Ref.
Academy Awards	April 25, 2021	Best Documentary Feature	Garrett Bradley, Lauren Domino and Kellen Quinn	Nominated	
Film Independent Spirit Awards	April 22, 2021	Best Documentary Feature	Time	Nominated	
Critics' Choice Documentary Awards	November 16, 2020	Best Documentary		Nominated	
Critics' Choice Documentary Awards	November 16, 2020	Best Narration	Fox Rich	Nominated	
Critics' Choice Documentary Awards	November 16, 2020	Best Director	Garrett Bradley	Nominated	
Critics' Choice Documentary Awards	November 16, 2020	Most Compelling Living Subject of a Documentary	Fox Rich	Won	
Gotham Independent Film Awards	January 11, 2021	Best Documentary		Won	
Gotham Independent Film Awards	January 11, 2021	Audience Award		Nominated	
International Documentary Association	January 16, 2021	Best Director	Garrett Bradley	Won	
International Documentary Association	January 16, 2021	Best Feature		Nominated	
International Documentary Association	January 16, 2021	Best Cinematography	Nisa East & Zac Manuel & Justin Zweifach	Nominated	
Los Angeles Film Critics Association Awards	December 20, 2020	Best Documentary Film		Won	
Los Angeles Film Critics Association Awards	December 20, 2020	Best Editing	Gabriel Rhodes	Runner-up	
National Society of Film Critics Awards	January 9, 2021	Best Non-Fiction Film		Won	
New York Film Critics Circle Awards	December 18, 2020	Best Non-Fiction Film		Won	
London Film Critics Circle Awards	February 7, 2021	Documentary of the Year		Nominated	
Black Film Critics Circle Awards	January 21, 2020	Best Documentary		Won	
Chicago Film Critics Association Awards	December 21, 2020	Best Documentary		Nominated	
Sundance Film Festival	February 1, 2020	U.S. Documentary Competition – Directing	Garrett Bradley	Won	
Sundance Film Festival	February 1, 2020	Grand Jury Prize		Nominated	
Cinema Eye Honors	March 9, 2021	The Unforgettables	Fox Rich	Won	
Cinema Eye Honors	March 9, 2021	Audience Choice Prize		Nominated	
Cinema Eye Honors	March 9, 2021	Outstanding Achievement in Direction	Garrett Bradley	Nominated	
Cinema Eye Honors	March 9, 2021	Outstanding Achievement in Original Music Score	Edwin Montgomery & Jamieson Shaw	Nominated	
Cinema Eye Honors	March 9, 2021	Outstanding Achievement in a Debut Feature Film	Garrett Bradley	Won	
Cinema Eye Honors	March 9, 2021	Outstanding Achievement in Nonfiction Feature Filmmaking		Nominated	
Cinema Eye Honors	March 9, 2021	Outstanding Achievement in Editing	Gabriel Rhodes	Won	
Producers Guild of America Awards	March 24, 2021	Outstanding Producer of Documentary Theatrical Motion Pictures	Time	Nominated	
Peabody Awards		Documentary honoree	Time	Won	
