= Near Death (1989 film) =

1989 documentary film by Frederick Wiseman

Near Death is a 1989 documentary film directed by Frederick Wiseman. It explores the Medical Intensive Care Unit (MICU) at Beth Israel Hospital in Boston.
