= National Gallery (film) =

2014 documentary directed by Frederick Wiseman

- Directed by: Frederick Wiseman
- Produced by: Frederick Wiseman; Pierre-Olivier Bardet
- Cinematography: John Davey
- Edited by: Frederick Wiseman
- Distributed by: Zipporah Films
- Release date: May 17, 2014 (Cannes)
- Running time: 180 minutes
- Countries: France; United States; United Kingdom
- Language: English

National Gallery is a 2014 documentary film edited, co-produced, and directed by Frederick Wiseman. The film details operations at the National Gallery in London.

== Synopsis ==
The film captures daily activity at the National Gallery in London, depicting both the guests' experience at the museum and behind-the-scenes employee operations. Like Wiseman's other films, the film uses only observational footage with no interviews, music, or voiceover narration.

== Release ==
The film premiered at the 67th Cannes Film Festival through the Directors' Fortnight program, and later participated in other festivals such as the New York Film Festival and Toronto International Film Festival.

== Reception ==
=== Critical response ===
On review aggregator Rotten Tomatoes the film received a positive response from 95% of critics and 72% of audience members. On Metacritic, the film holds a score of 89 out of 100, indicating "universal acclaim".

Manohla Dargis of the New York Times praised the film for its "cool intelligence and steady camera", calling it an "unexpectedly moving" experience.

=== Box office ===
As of June 2024, the film has an estimated worldwide gross of $354,971 since its release.
