= Aspen (film) =

1991 documentary film

Aspen is a 1991 documentary film directed by Frederick Wiseman which explores the town of Aspen, Colorado.
