= National Society of Film Critics Award for Best Picture =

Annual film award

The National Society of Film Critics Award for Best Picture is an annual award given by National Society of Film Critics to honor the best film of the year.

== History ==
Since it was established in 1966, the Society has only agreed with the Academy Award for Best Picture ten times: Annie Hall (1977), Unforgiven (1992), Schindler's List (1993), Million Dollar Baby (2004), The Hurt Locker (2009), Spotlight (2015), Moonlight (2016), Parasite (2019), Nomadland (2020), and One Battle After Another (2025).

== Winners ==
=== 1960s ===
Year	Winner	Director(s)
1966	Blow-Up	Michelangelo Antonioni
1967	Persona	Ingmar Bergman
1968	Shame (Skammen)	Ingmar Bergman
1969	Z	Costa-Gavras

=== 1970s ===
Year	Winner	Director(s)
1970	M*A*S*H	Robert Altman
1971	Claire's Knee (Le genou de Claire)	Éric Rohmer
1972	The Discreet Charm of the Bourgeoisie (Le charme discret de la bourgeoisie)	Luis Buñuel
1973	Day for Night (La nuit américaine)	François Truffaut
1974	Scenes from a Marriage (Scener ur ett äktenskap)	Ingmar Bergman
1975	Nashville	Robert Altman
1976	All the President's Men	Alan J. Pakula
1977	Annie Hall	Woody Allen
1978	Get Out Your Handkerchiefs (Préparez vos mouchoirs)	Bertrand Blier
1979	Breaking Away	Peter Yates

=== 1980s ===
Year	Winner	Director(s)
1980	Melvin and Howard	Jonathan Demme
1981	Atlantic City	Louis Malle
1982	Tootsie	Sydney Pollack
1983	The Night of the Shooting Stars (La notte di San Lorenzo)	Paolo Taviani and Vittorio Taviani
1984	Stranger Than Paradise	Jim Jarmusch
1985	Ran	Akira Kurosawa
1986	Blue Velvet	David Lynch
1987	The Dead	John Huston
1988	The Unbearable Lightness of Being	Philip Kaufman
1989	Drugstore Cowboy	Gus Van Sant

=== 1990s ===
Year	Winner	Director(s)
1990	Goodfellas	Martin Scorsese
1991	Life Is Sweet	Mike Leigh
1992	Unforgiven	Clint Eastwood
1993	Schindler's List	Steven Spielberg
1994	Pulp Fiction	Quentin Tarantino
1995	Babe	Chris Noonan
1996	Breaking the Waves	Lars von Trier
1997	L.A. Confidential	Curtis Hanson
1998	Out of Sight	Steven Soderbergh
1999	Being John Malkovich	Spike Jonze
1999	Topsy-Turvy	Mike Leigh

=== 2000s ===
Year	Winner	Director(s)
2000	Yi Yi	Edward Yang
2001	Mulholland Drive	David Lynch
2002	The Pianist	Roman Polanski
2003	American Splendor	Shari Springer Berman and Robert Pulcini
2004	Million Dollar Baby	Clint Eastwood
2005	Capote	Bennett Miller
2006	Pan's Labyrinth (El laberinto del fauno)	Guillermo del Toro
2007	There Will Be Blood	Paul Thomas Anderson
2008	Waltz with Bashir (Vals im Bashir)	Ari Folman
2009	The Hurt Locker	Kathryn Bigelow

=== 2010s ===
Year	Winner	Director(s)
2010	The Social Network	David Fincher
2011	Melancholia	Lars von Trier
2012	Amour	Michael Haneke
2013	Inside Llewyn Davis	Joel Coen and Ethan Coen
2014	Goodbye to Language (Adieu au Langage)	Jean-Luc Godard
2015	Spotlight	Tom McCarthy
2016	Moonlight	Barry Jenkins
2017	Lady Bird	Greta Gerwig
2018	The Rider	Chloé Zhao
2019	Parasite (Gisaengchung)	Bong Joon-ho

=== 2020s ===
Year	Winner	Director(s)
2020	Nomadland	Chloé Zhao
2021	Drive My Car	Ryusuke Hamaguchi
2022	TÁR	Todd Field
2023	Past Lives	Celine Song
2024	Nickel Boys	RaMell Ross
2025	One Battle After Another	Paul Thomas Anderson

== Multiple winners ==
- Ingmar Bergman – 3
- Robert Altman – 2
- Paul Thomas Anderson - 2
- Clint Eastwood – 2
- Mike Leigh – 2 (one tied with Spike Jonze)
- David Lynch – 2
- Lars von Trier – 2
- Chloé Zhao – 2
