= 2023 National Society of Film Critics Awards =

Awards for films from 2023

58th NSFC Awards
- Date: January 6, 2024

Highlights
- Best Picture: Past Lives

The 58th National Society of Film Critics Awards, given on 6 January 2024, honored the best in film for 2023.

American film May December and British historical drama film The Zone of Interest won the most awards with two wins each, though Past Lives (Celine Song's feature directorial debut) won Best Picture.

== Winners ==
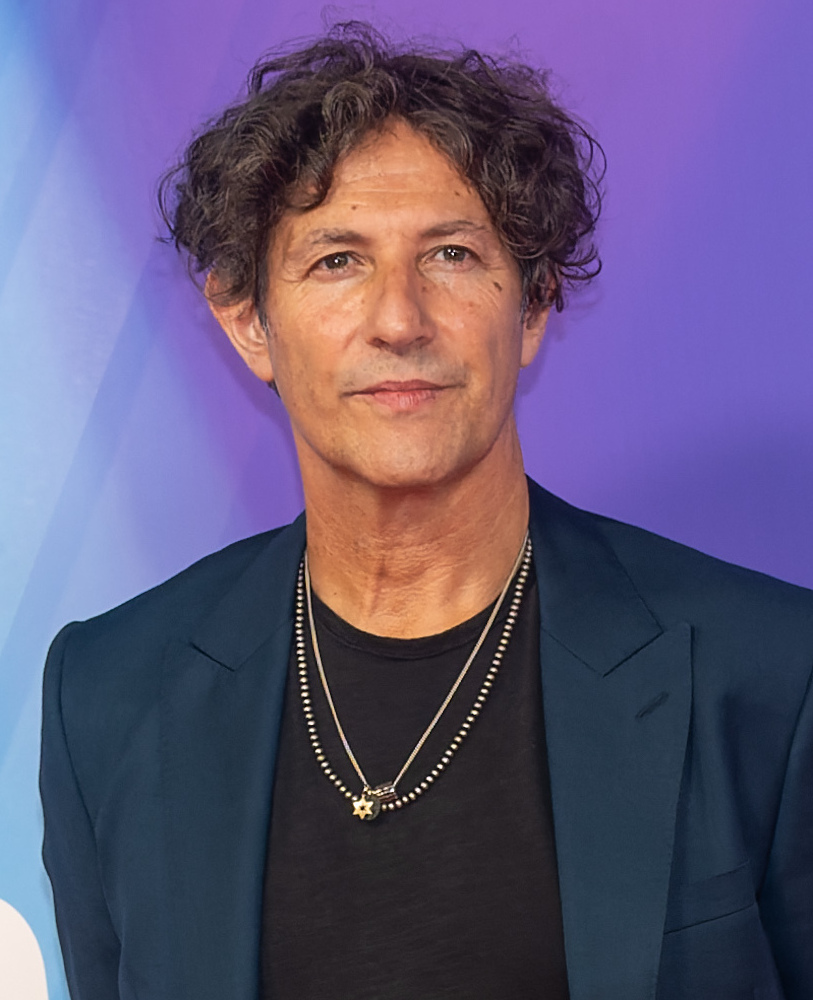
Jonathan Glazer, Best Director winner

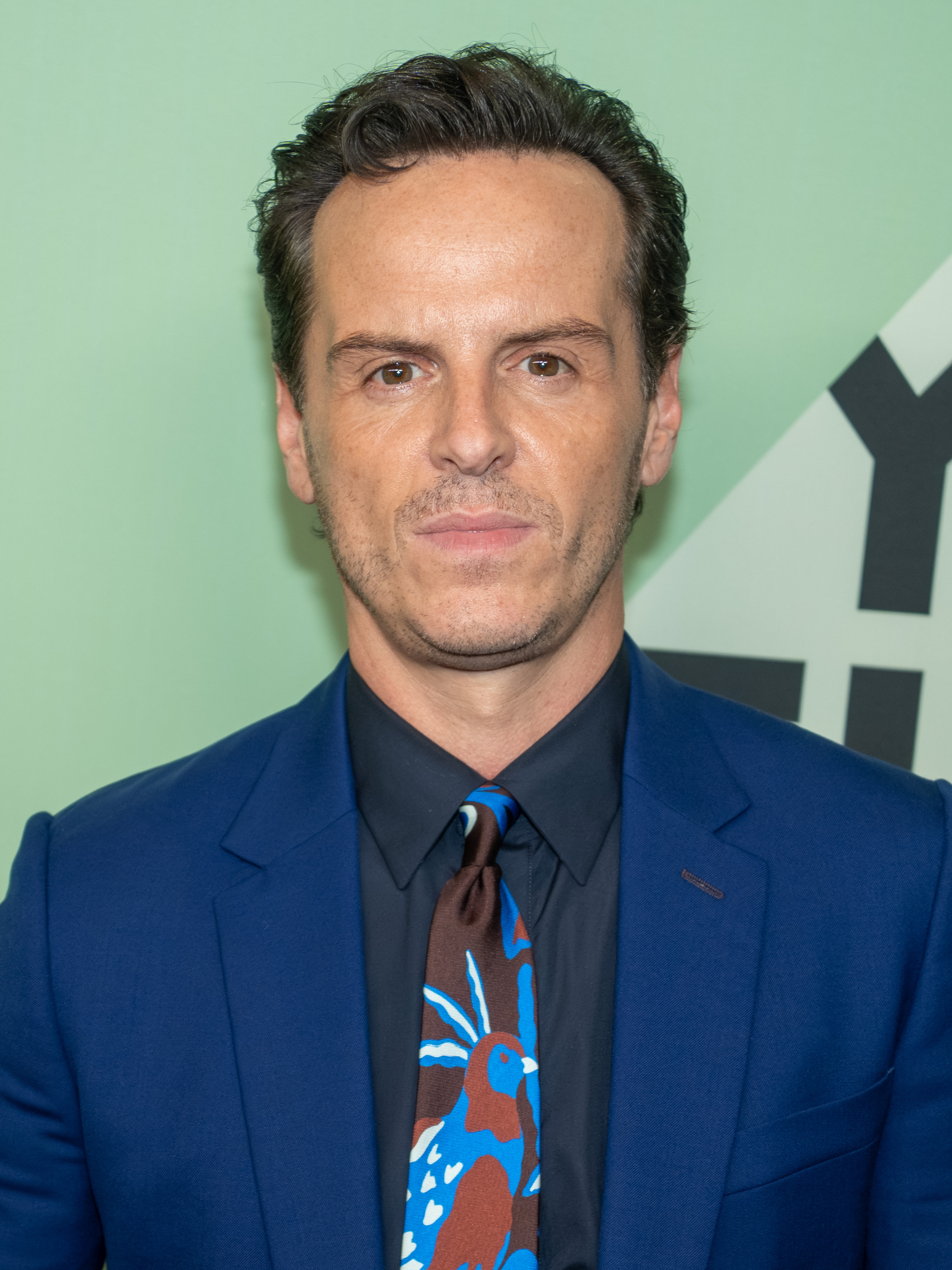
Andrew Scott, Best Actor winner

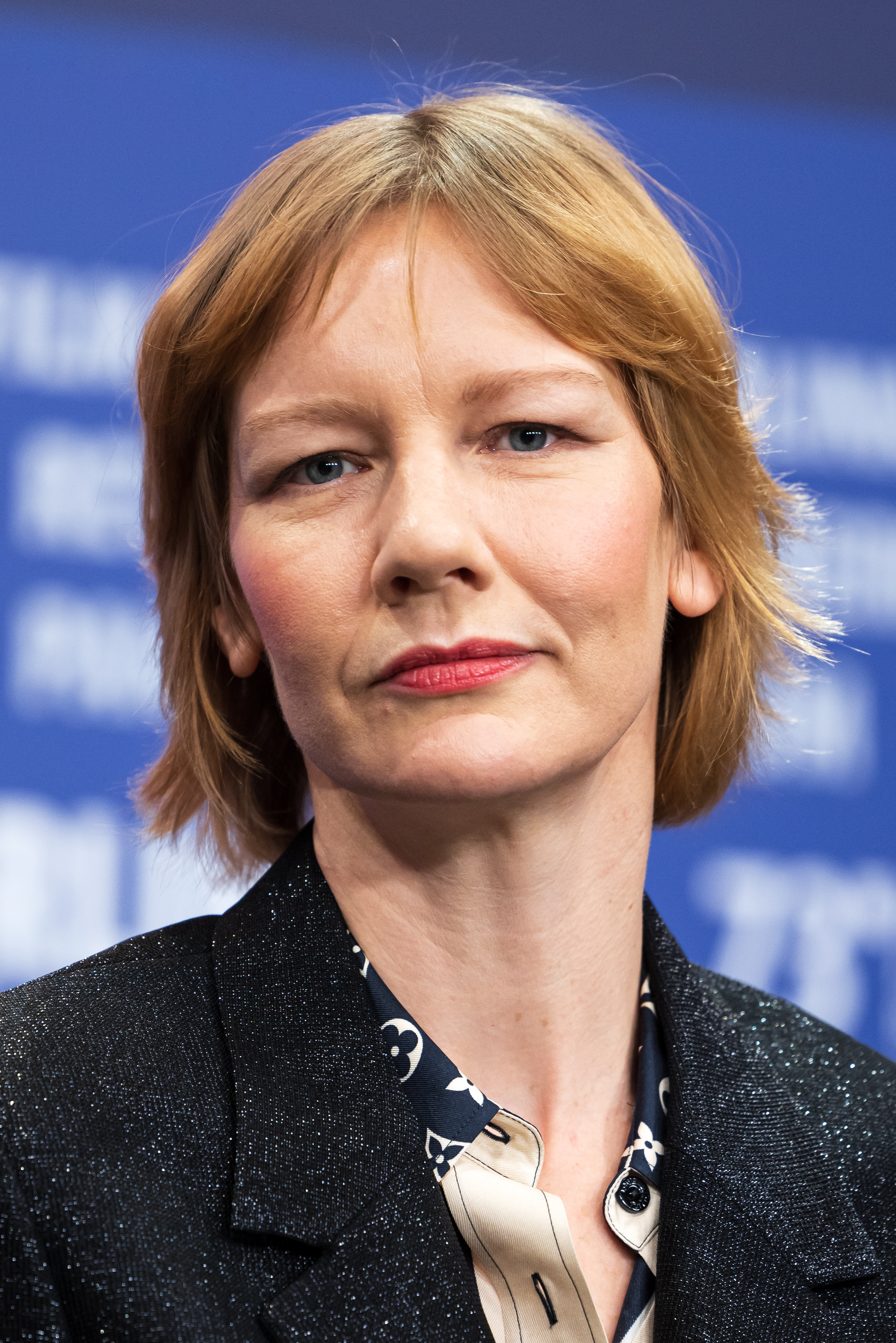
Sandra Hüller, Best Actress winner

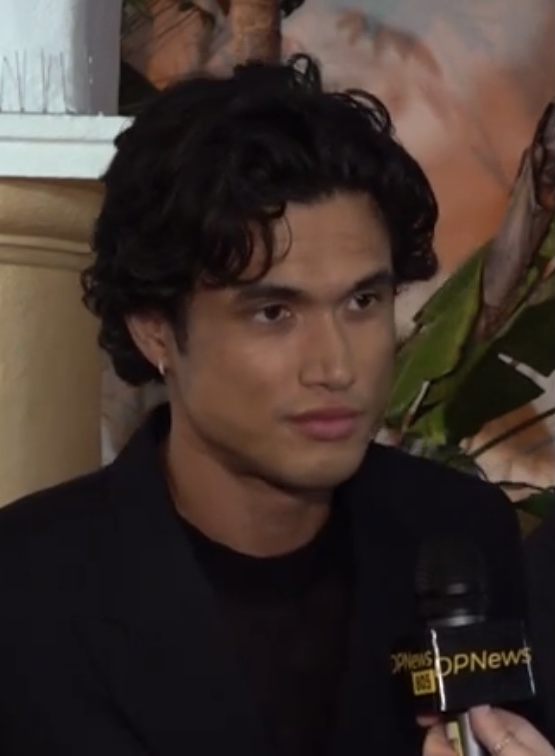
Charles Melton, Best Supporting Actor winner

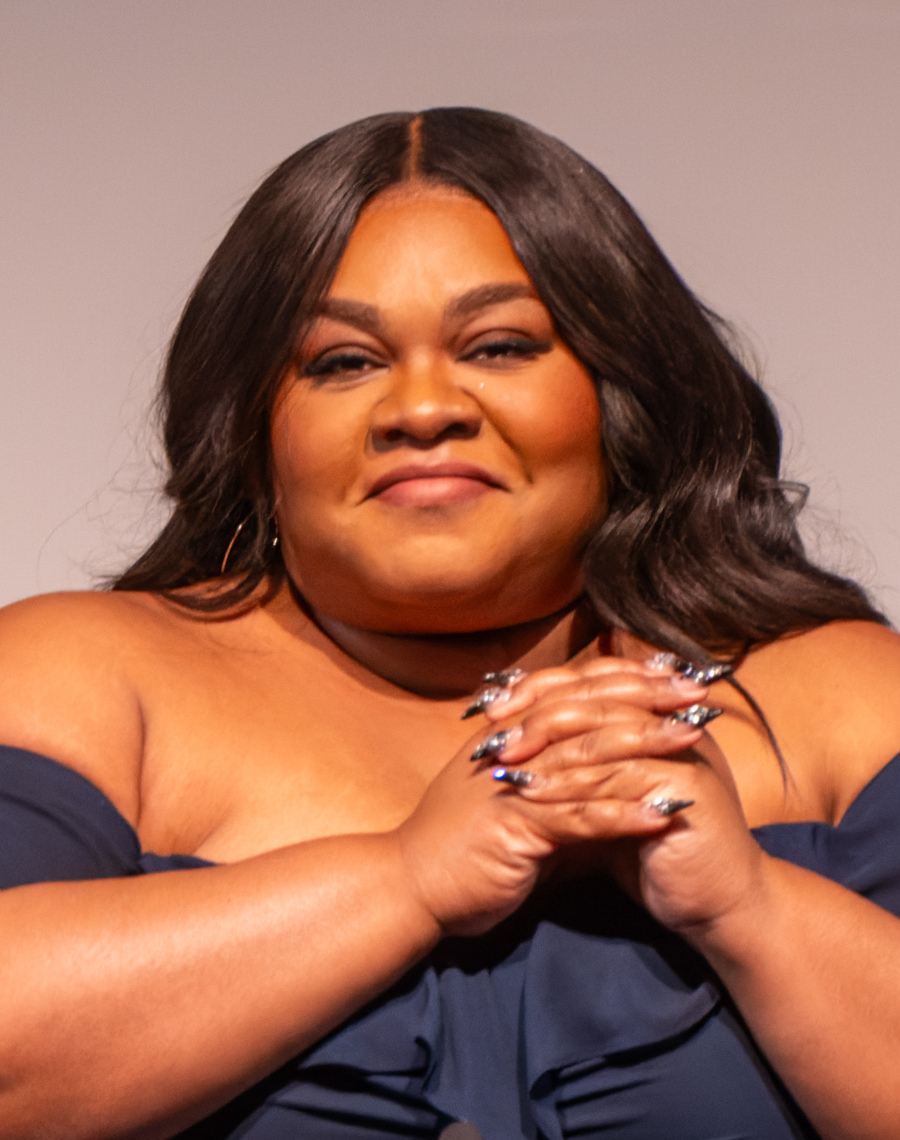
Da'Vine Joy Randolph, Best Supporting Actress winner

Winners are listed in boldface along with the runner-up positions and counts from the final round:

=== Best Picture ===
1. **Past Lives** (51)
2. The Zone of Interest (49)
3. Oppenheimer (44)

=== Best Director ===
1. **Jonathan Glazer – The Zone of Interest** (65)
2. Todd Haynes – May December (42)
3. Christopher Nolan – Oppenheimer (41)

=== Best Actor ===
1. **Andrew Scott – All of Us Strangers** (52)
2. Jeffrey Wright – American Fiction (39)
3. Cillian Murphy – Oppenheimer (29)

=== Best Actress ===
1. **Sandra Hüller – Anatomy of a Fall / The Zone of Interest** (61)
2. Emma Stone – Poor Things (56)
3. Lily Gladstone – Killers of the Flower Moon (44)

=== Best Supporting Actor ===
1. **Charles Melton – May December** (51)
2. Robert Downey Jr. – Oppenheimer / Ryan Gosling – Barbie (31) **(TIE)**

=== Best Supporting Actress ===
1. **Da'Vine Joy Randolph – The Holdovers** (58)
2. Penélope Cruz – Ferrari (32)
3. Rachel McAdams – Are You There God? It's Me, Margaret. (23)

=== Best Screenplay ===
1. **Samy Burch – May December** (53)
2. Celine Song – Past Lives (50)
3. David Hemingson – The Holdovers (36)

=== Best Cinematography ===
1. **Rodrigo Prieto – Killers of the Flower Moon** (55)
2. Łukasz Żal – The Zone of Interest (45)
3. Hoyte van Hoytema – Oppenheimer (44)

=== Best Film Not in the English Language ===
1. **Fallen Leaves** (65)
2. The Zone of Interest (51)
3. Anatomy of a Fall (44)

=== Best Nonfiction Film ===
1. **Menus-Plaisirs – Les Troisgros** (65)
2. 20 Days in Mariupol (25)
3. Kokomo City (19)

=== Best Experimental Film ===
- Jean-Luc Godard's Trailer of the Film That Will Never Exist: "Phony Wars"

=== Film Heritage Award ===
- The Criterion Collection for its "adventurous, wide-ranging, finely curated selection of films, ranging from American independents to world cinema to short films to classic Hollywood, making readily available the kind of repertory cinema that every city should have".
- Facets, Kim's Video, Scarecrow Video, and Vidiots for "maintaining wide-reaching libraries of films on disc and tape, and making those libraries available to the general public".

=== Special Citation for a Film Awaiting U.S. Distribution ===
- Víctor Erice's Close Your Eyes
