= La Dernière Lettre =

2002 film directed by Frederick Wiseman

La Dernière Lettre is a 2002 film directed by Frederick Wiseman. It is based on a chapter of the Vasily Grossman novel Life and Fate which he had first adapted to theater.
