= Racetrack (1985 film) =

Racetrack is a 1985 documentary film directed by Frederick Wiseman which explores the horse racing world through Belmont Park racetrack.

== Synopsis ==
Racetrack focuses on the racetrack in Belmont, New York. It shows both behind-the-scenes and the need for human attention to horses and the adrenaline moments around the races. It is the whole society that revolves around this place that is analyzed by the director.
