= Blye Pagon Faust =

American film producer

Blye P. Faust
- Born: Blye Pagon
- Education: Santa Clara University (BA); University of California, Los Angeles (JD)
- Occupation: Producer

Blye Pagon Faust is an American film, television, and audio producer for the production company Story Force Entertainment.

== Early life and education ==
Blye Pagon Faust was raised in Monroe, Washington, and graduated from Monroe High School in 1993.

She attended Santa Clara University in Santa Clara, California, where she earned a degree in English and studied theater. She subsequently moved to Los Angeles and attained a J.D. with an emphasis in entertainment law from the UCLA School of Law.

== Career ==
Following law school, Faust worked for O'Melveny & Myers in Los Angeles.

In 2007, she began working on the film Spotlight with Nicole Rocklin. In the fall of 2009, she partnered with Rocklin to form the production company Rocklin/Faust. Spotlight went on to win Best Motion Picture and Best Original Screenplay at the 88th Academy Awards. The film was also recognized at the 69th British Academy Film Awards as the Best Original Screenplay winner and Best Film nominee.

In 2019, she partnered with producer Cori Shepherd Stern to form Story Force Entertainment (formerly Based On Media).

Faust executive produced the Emmy Award-winning and Peabody-nominated documentary Belly of the Beast. She also worked on the Emmy- and Critic's Choice Award-nominated documentary Rewind. In 2022, she produced The Grab, a feature documentary from Magnolia Pictures and Participant Media. The Grab received an Emmy Award for Outstanding Research, as well as nominations for Outstanding Investigative Documentary, Best Documentary, and Outstanding Promotional Announcement for Documentary.

In the podcast space, Faust executive produced Wondery’s Dr. Death: Bad Magic series and the Wall Street Journal's Bad Bets: The Unraveling of Trevor Milton.

For Prime Video, she executive produced the smash-hit docuseries LuLaRich and Shiny Happy People. At the time of the first season's release, Shiny Happy People had the biggest debut of any documentary series ever produced by Amazon Studios.

In 2024, she produced the feature documentary Zurawski v Texas, with executive producers Jennifer Lawrence, Hillary Clinton, and Chelsea Clinton. The film premiered at the Telluride Film Festival.

Faust executive produced Tom McCarthy's upcoming feature film, A Statement. The film premiered at the 2026 New York Film Festival, and will be released through Sony Pictures Classics in 2027.

== Other activities ==
Faust has served as a ReFrame Rise sponsor; a member of the Advisory Committee for the Mill Valley Film Festival's Mind the Gap: Women|Film|Tech initiative; and a board member for The Center for Investigative Reporting.

She is a member of the Producers Guild of America, the Television Academy and the State Bar of California.

As of July 2025, she is also a member of the CreativeFuture Leadership Committee.

== Personal life ==
She is married and has two sons.
