= Nicole Rocklin =

American film producer

- Born: 1979 or 1980 (age 45–46)
- Occupation: Film producer

Nicole Rocklin (born 1979/1980) is an American film producer for the production company Rocklin Entertainment.

== Biography ==
Rocklin was raised in a Jewish family in Calabasas, California and attended the University of Wisconsin–Madison, before moving to Los Angeles to work for an entertainment law firm. She left the law firm and briefly worked for Jerry Bruckheimer Films before starting her own production company. She began working on the film Spotlight with partner Blye Faust in 2007, and in the fall of 2009, she joined with Faust to form Rocklin/Faust.

Rocklin has served as a producer for films such as Middle of Nowhere and The Perfect Guy. In 2016, she won an Academy Award for Best Picture in the 88th Academy Awards for her work on Spotlight and she was nominated for the BAFTA Award for Best Film in the 69th British Academy Film Awards.
