= Frederick Wiseman =

American filmmaker (1930–2026)

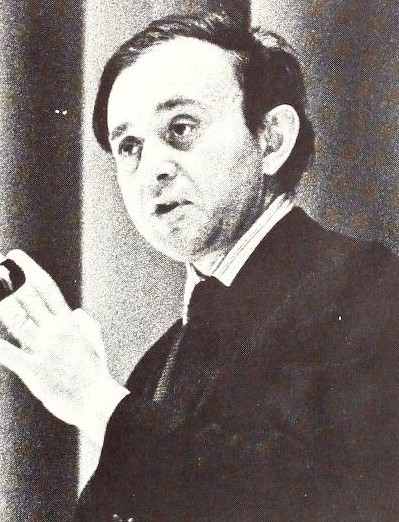
- Wiseman in 1971
- Born: January 1, 1930; Boston, Massachusetts, U.S.
- Died: February 16, 2026 (aged 96); Cambridge, Massachusetts, U.S.
- Education: Williams College (B.A.); Yale Law School (LL.B.)
- Occupations: Director; producer; actor; editor; writer
- Years active: 1963–2025
- Notable work: Titicut Follies, Hospital, Welfare, In Jackson Heights, Ex Libris: The New York Public Library, A Couple
- Spouse: Zipporah Batshaw (m. 1955; died 2021)
- Children: 2
- Awards: Guggenheim Fellowship (1980); MacArthur Fellowship (1982); Dan David Prize (2003); Golden Lion for Lifetime Achievement (2014); Academy Honorary Award (2016); Critics' Choice Documentary Award for Best Director (2017)

Frederick Wiseman (January 1, 1930 – February 16, 2026) was an American filmmaker, documentarian, theater director, editor, and actor. His work primarily explored American institutions. His most notable documentaries include Titicut Follies (1967), Hospital (1970), Welfare (1975), and In Jackson Heights (2015). His films were noted for their dramatic structure despite appearing to eschew narrative devices and for tackling social and economic issues in the United States.

Wiseman's other documentaries include High School (1968), Law and Order (1969), Model (1981), Missile (1988), Ballet (1995), State Legislature (2007), La Danse (2009), Boxing Gym (2010), National Gallery (2014), Ex Libris: The New York Public Library (2017), Monrovia, Indiana (2018), City Hall (2020), and Menus-Plaisirs – Les Troisgros (2023). He only directed two narrative films: La Dernière Lettre (2002) and A Couple (2022). Aside from filmmaking, he also directed several stage productions and appeared in films such as in The Summer House (2018), Other People's Children (2022), Eephus (2024) and A Private Life (2025).

In 2016, Wiseman received an Academy Honorary Award from the Academy of Motion Picture Arts and Sciences. In 2017, The New York Times called him "one of the most important and original filmmakers working today". Also in 2017, he won the Critics' Choice Documentary Award for Best Director for Ex Libris: The New York Public Library. Wiseman announced his retirement in 2025.

== Early life ==
Wiseman was born to a Jewish family in Boston on January 1, 1930, the son of Gertrude Leah (née Kotzen) and Jacob Leo Wiseman. He earned a Bachelor of Arts from Williams College in 1951, and a Bachelor of Laws from Yale Law School in 1954.

Wiseman spent 1954 to 1956 serving in the U.S. Army after being drafted. He spent the next two years in Paris before returning to the U.S., where he took a job teaching law at the Boston University Institute of Law and Medicine. He then started documentary filmmaking. He won numerous film awards and Guggenheim and MacArthur fellowships.

== Career ==
=== Filmmaking ===
The first feature-length film Wiseman produced was The Cool World (1963), about African-American life in the Royal Pythons, a youth gang in Harlem. The film was selected for preservation in the United States National Film Registry. This was followed by Titicut Follies (1967), which he produced and directed. Titicut Follies is one of Wiseman's best-known works and in 2022 was selected for preservation in the United States National Film Registry by the Library of Congress as "culturally, historically, or aesthetically significant". Wiseman then directed High School (1968) and Law and Order (1969), the latter of which earned him the Emmy Award for Outstanding Achievement in News Documentary Programming.

In 1970, Wiseman directed Hospital, a documentary about the daily activities of the people at Metropolitan Hospital Center in New York City. The film won two Emmy Awards for Outstanding Achievement in News Documentary Programming – Individuals and Outstanding Achievement in News Documentary Programming – Programs. In 1994, it was selected for preservation in the United States National Film Registry. The film was also selected for screening as part of the Cannes Classics section at the 2016 Cannes Film Festival. In 1971, Wiseman founded Zipporah Films, a film distribution company. After making several short documentaries, in 1975 he directed Welfare, a documentary about the U.S. welfare system from the viewpoint of both officials and claimants. Critics considered Welfare Wiseman's masterpiece. In 1976, Wiseman directed Meat, about the Colorado meatpacking industry.

In the 1980s, Wiseman directed Model (1981) and Missile (1988), among other documentaries. Model is about the Zoli modeling agency and Missile is about the U.S. military training and operations surrounding ICBM. In the 1990s, Wiseman directed Central Park (1990), Ballet (1995), Public Housing (1997), and Belfast, Maine (1999).

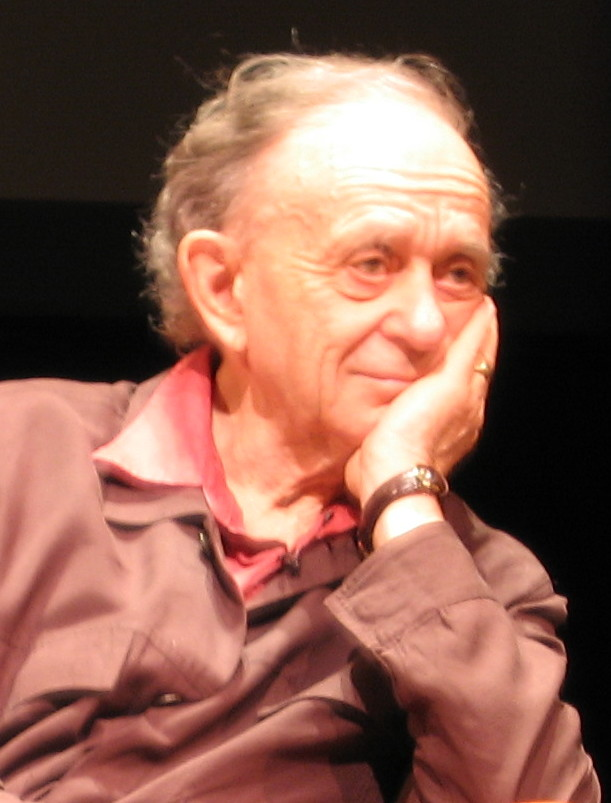
Wiseman in 2005

Wiseman's Domestic Violence (2000) premiered at the 58th Venice International Film Festival. In 2007, he produced State Legislature for PBS, about the workings of the Idaho Legislature. In 2009, he made La Danse, about the ballet productions of Paris Opera Ballet.

Wiseman found renewed success in the 2010s. His 2010 documentary Boxing Gym premiered at the 63rd Cannes Film Festival. His 2011 documentary Crazy Horse is about the Paris cabaret of that name, known for its stage shows performed by nude female dancers. In 2014, Wiseman's documentary National Gallery, about London's National Gallery, premiered at the 67th Cannes Film Festival and screened at other festivals, such as the New York Film Festival and Toronto International Film Festival. Wiseman's 2015 documentary In Jackson Heights is regarded as one of his best. It documents events in New York's Jackson Heights neighborhood, focusing on local politics and activist organizations. It won the New York Film Critics Circle Award for Best Non-Fiction Film in 2015. The New York Times named it the 13th "Best Film of the 21st Century So Far". Wiseman next directed Ex Libris: The New York Public Library (2017) and Monrovia, Indiana (2018). Ex Libris: The New York Public Library screened in the main competition section of the 74th Venice International Film Festival, where it won the FIPRESCI Award. Wiseman also won the Critics' Choice Documentary Award for Best Director for Ex Libris in 2017.

Wiseman's output continued into the 2020s. City Hall (2020), produced for PBS, is about the government of Boston. Cahiers du Cinéma named it the best film of 2020. In 2022, Wiseman directed the feature-length film A Couple, his second narrative film after La Dernière Lettre (2002). In 2023, he made his final documentary, Menus-Plaisirs – Les Troisgros, about the daily activities of the French restaurant Le Bois sans feuilles.

Wiseman's films are often described as in the observational mode, which has its roots in direct cinema, but Wiseman disliked the term:

What I try to do is edit the films so that they will have a dramatic structure. That is why I object to some extent to the term "observational cinema" or cinéma vérité, because observational cinema, to me at least, connotes just hanging around with one thing being as valuable as another, and that is not true. At least, that is not true for me, and cinéma vérité is just a pompous French term that has absolutely no meaning as far as I'm concerned.

All his films have aired on PBS, one of his primary funders. Wiseman was known to call his films "Reality Fictions". His films have also been called studies of social institutions, such as hospitals, schools, or police departments.

==== Process and style ====
Wiseman worked four to six weeks in the institutions he portrayed, with almost no preparation. He spent the bulk of the production period editing the material, trying to find a rhythm for the film.

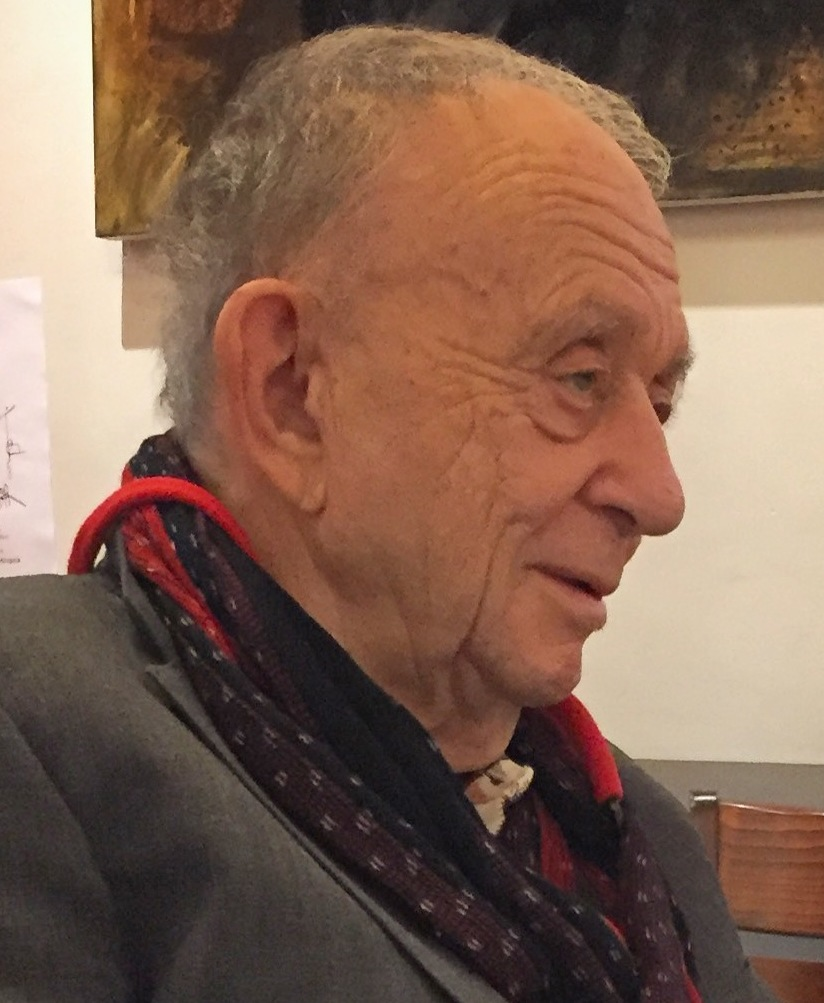
Wiseman in France in 2017

Every Wiseman film has a dramatic structure, though not necessarily a narrative arc; his films rarely have what could be considered a climax or conclusion. He liked to approach his material with no particular thesis or point of view in mind. Any suspense is on a per-scene level, not constructed from plot points, and the viewer is not expected to identify with particular characters. Nevertheless, Wiseman felt that drama was crucial for his films to "work as movies" (Poppy). The "rhythm and structure" of his films, he felt, pull the viewer into the position and perspective of the subject (human or otherwise). The viewer feels the situations' dramatic tension as various environmental forces create complications and conflicting values.

Wiseman admitted to manipulating his source material to create dramatic structure, insisting that it was necessary to "make a movie":

I'm trying to make a movie. A movie has to have dramatic sequence and structure. I don't have a very precise definition about what constitutes drama, but I'm gambling that I'm going to get dramatic episodes. Otherwise, it becomes Empire. ... I am looking for drama, though I'm not necessarily looking for people beating each other up, shooting each other. There's a lot of drama in ordinary experiences. In Public Housing, there was drama in that old man being evicted from his apartment by the police. There was a lot of drama in that old woman at her kitchen table peeling a cabbage.

Wiseman said his films' structure was important to their message:

It's the structural aspect that interests me most, and the issue there is developing a theory that will relate these isolated, nonrelated sequences to each other. That is partially, I think, related to figuring out how it either contradicts or adds to or explains in some way some other sequence in the film. Then you try to determine the effect of a particular sequence on that point of view of the film.

A distinctive aspect of Wiseman's style is the complete lack of exposition (narration), interaction (interviews), and reflection (revealing any of the filmmaking process). Wiseman once said he did not "feel any need to document [his] experience" and that he felt that such reflexive elements in films are vain.

While producing a film, Wiseman often acquired more than 100 hours of raw footage. His ability to create an engaging feature-length films without the use of voice-over, title cards, or motion graphics while still being fair is part of his reputation as a filmmaker.

This great glop of material which represents the externally recorded memory of my experience of making the film is of necessity incomplete. The memories not preserved on film float somewhat in my mind as fragments available for recall, unavailable for inclusion but of great importance in the mining and shifting process known as editing. This editorial process ... is sometimes deductive, sometimes associational, sometimes non-logical and sometimes a failure... The crucial element for me is to try and think through my own relationship to the material by whatever combination of means is compatible. This involves a need to conduct a four-way conversation between myself, the sequence being worked on, my memory, and general values and experience.

==== Philosophy ====
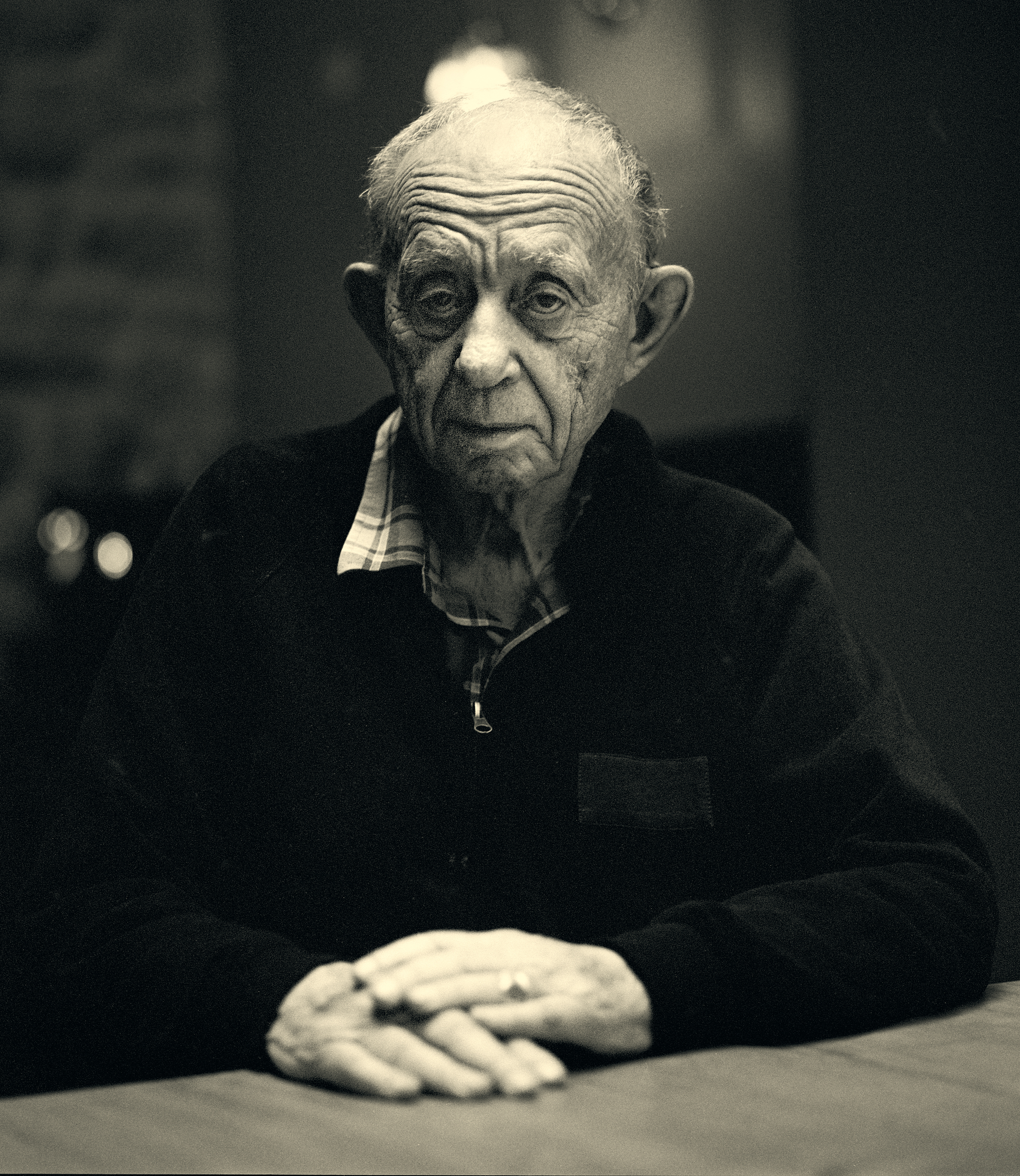
Wiseman in 2021

In Wiseman's view, his films are elaborations of a personal experience, not ideologically objective portraits.

In interviews, he emphasized that his films are not and cannot be unbiased. But despite the inescapable bias introduced in the process of "making a movie", he still felt he had certain ethical obligations in how he portrayed events:

[My films are] based on unstaged, unmanipulated actions... The editing is highly manipulative and the shooting is highly manipulative... What you choose to shoot, the way you shoot it, the way you edit it and the way you structure it... all of those things... represent subjective choices that you have to make. In [Belfast, Maine] I had 110 hours of material ... I only used 4 hours—near nothing. The compression within a sequence represents choice and then the way the sequences are arranged in relationship to the other represents choice.

All aspects of documentary filmmaking involve choice and are therefore manipulative. But the ethical ... aspect of it is that you have to ... try to make [a film that] is true to the spirit of your sense of what was going on. ... My view is that these films are biased, prejudiced, condensed, compressed but fair. I think what I do is make movies that are not accurate in any objective sense, but accurate in the sense that I think they're a fair account of the experience I've had in making the movie.

I think I have an obligation to the people who have consented to be in the film ... to cut it so that it fairly represents what I felt was going on at the time in the original event.

=== Acting and theater works ===
In 2017, Wiseman played a minor role as a CNC Member in Valeria Bruni Tedeschi's film The Summer House. In the 2020s, he began taking more acting roles, including in the films Other People's Children, A Private Life (both by Rebecca Zlotowski), and Jane Austen Wrecked My Life. Wiseman also had a voice role as a radio host in the 2024 film Eephus.

Wiseman also directed and was involved in theater in the U.S. and France. He directed Tonight We Improvise (1986–1987), Hate (1991), The Last Letter (2001–2003), and Oh les beaux jours (2006–2007). He also wrote and directed Welfare: The Opera, which ran from 1987 to 1997, and directed Emily Dickinson, La Belle d'Amherst, which ran in Paris in 2012.

=== Retirement ===
In a 2025 interview, Wiseman said he was retiring because he did not "have the energy" for a new production.

== Personal life and death ==
Wiseman was married to Zipporah Batshaw from 1955 until her death in 2021. They had two sons. He lived in Cambridge, Massachusetts, and owned a summer home in Northport, Maine. He also owned a home in Paris.

Wiseman died at his home in Cambridge on February 16, 2026, at the age of 96.

== Legacy ==
In 1969, critic Pauline Kael wrote that Wiseman was "probably the most sophisticated intelligence to enter the documentary field in years". In 2013, critic Matt Zoller Seitz wrote that Wiseman was "also master of 'Look ma, no self-awareness' documentaries that analyze themselves without seeming to" and included scenes that felt like "meta-commentaries" without being complex or overused. Penn State University Professors Thomas W. Benson and Carolyn Anderson called Wiseman one of the "most original, consequential, and productive documentary filmmakers of the past century".

Wiseman's work has been said to have inspired a generation of filmmakers. Documentarians and directors inspired by Wiseman include Alice Diop, Lance Oppenheim, Ryusuke Hamaguchi, and Errol Morris. Diop credited Wiseman as her inspiration in becoming a filmmaker. Morris saw Wiseman as a mentor and credited him for saving his life. Hamaguchi said he was inspired by Wiseman's films, often incorporating elements from them into his own work. Wiseman was recognized for influencing generations of documentary filmmakers who eschew voiceover and interviews for immersive observation.

After his death, The New York Times noted that Wiseman's "penetrating documentaries" helped "expose" abuses in vulnerable communities. In its obituary, it called him a "director whose rigorously objective explorations of social and cultural institutions constitute one of the more revered bodies of work in American documentary filmmaking". The Rolling Stone called Wiseman a "titan" of documentary filmmaking. The British Film Institute called him a "towering figure of American documentary filmmaking" and wrote that his films created a "uniquely austere, quietly radical form of documentary cinema".

While presenting Wiseman with the Academy Honorary Award in 2016, actor Ben Kingsley said that his documentaries were made to offer "pure information" and deliver powerful emotional moments to his audience.

Wiseman's work is also said to have affected American institutions and attempted to hold the United States accountable in moral and ethical situations. The Associated Press called him one of the most admired and influential filmmakers. Wiseman is also credited for his editing style, which has been seen as an act of interpretation and a kind of moral accounting. The Guardian called Wiseman's films "monuments to human suffering and human challenge and human potential".

== Filmography ==
=== As director ===
Year	Title	Notes	Ref
1967	Titicut Follies		
1968	High School		
1969	Law and Order		
1970	Hospital		
1971	Basic Training		
1971	I Miss Sonia Henie	Collaborative short film	
1972	Essene		
1973	Juvenile Court		
1974	Primate		
1975	Welfare		
1976	Meat		
1977	Canal Zone		
1978	Sinai Field Mission		
1979	Manoeuvre		
1981	Model		
1982	Seraphita's Diary	Narrative film	
1983	The Store		
1985	Racetrack		
1986	Blind		
1986	Deaf		
1986	Adjustment & Work		
1986	Multi-Handicapped		
1988	Missile		
1989	Near Death		
1990	Central Park		
1991	Aspen		
1993	Zoo		
1994	High School II		
1995	Ballet		
1996	La Comédie-Française		
1997	Public Housing		
1999	Belfast, Maine		
2001	Domestic Violence		
2002	Domestic Violence 2		
2002	La Dernière Lettre	Narrative film	
2005	The Garden		
2007	State Legislature		
2009	La Danse		
2010	Boxing Gym		
2011	Crazy Horse		
2013	At Berkeley		
2014	National Gallery		
2015	In Jackson Heights		
2017	Ex Libris: The New York Public Library		
2018	Monrovia, Indiana		
2020	City Hall		
2022	A Couple	Narrative film	
2023	Menus-Plaisirs – Les Troisgros	Final film	

=== As actor ===
Year	Title	Role	Ref
2018	The Summer House	Membre Commission CNC	
2019	Thanksgiving	John	
2022	Other People's Children	Le docteur Wiseman – le gynécologue	
2022	À mon seul désir	Le client du printemps	
2024	Eephus	Branch Moreland (voice)	
2024	Jane Austen a gâché ma vie	Le poète	
2025	A Private Life	Dr. Goldstein	

=== Other credits ===
- The Cool World (1963) (producer only)

=== Theatre ===
- Tonight We Improvise by Luigi Pirandello. American Repertory Theatre, Cambridge. Director of video sequences and actor in role of documentary filmmaker, November 1986 – February 1987
- Hate by Joshua Goldstein. American Repertory Theatre, Cambridge. Director, January 1991
- Welfare: The Opera, story by Frederick Wiseman and David Slavitt, libretto by David Slavitt, music by Lenny Pickett.
- The Last Letter an adaptation from the novel Life and Fate by Vasily Grossman
- Oh les beaux jours by Samuel Beckett. La Comédie Française, Paris. Director, November – January 2006; Director and actor, January–March 2007.
- Emily Dickinson, La Belle d'Amherst (The Belle of Amherst) by William Luce. Le Théâtre Noir, Paris, Director, May–July 2012

== Accolades ==
In 2003, Wiseman received the Dan David Prize for his films. In 2006, he received the George Polk Career Award, given annually by Long Island University to honor contributions to journalistic integrity and investigative reporting. In spring 2012, Wiseman took part in the three-month exposition of the Whitney Biennial. In 2014, he was awarded the Golden Lion for Lifetime Achievement at the 71st Venice International Film Festival.

In 2016, Wiseman received an Academy Honorary Award from the Academy of Motion Picture Arts and Sciences. In 2017, he and Evgeny Afineevsky won the Critics' Choice Documentary Award for Best Director for Ex Libris: The New York Public Library and Cries from Syria, respectively, in a tie.

In 2021, Wiseman received an Carrosse d'Or at the Cannes Film Festival.
