= At Berkeley =

2013 documentary film by Frederick Wiseman

At Berkeley is a 2013 documentary film by Frederick Wiseman that explores the University of California at Berkeley.
