= High School (1968 film) =

- DVD
- Directed by: Frederick Wiseman
- Distributed by: Grove Press
- Release date: November 13, 1968
- Running time: 75 minutes
- Country: United States
- Language: English

High School is a 1968 American documentary film by Frederick Wiseman that shows a typical day for students and faculty at a Pennsylvanian high school during the late 1960s. It is one of the first direct cinema (or cinéma vérité) documentaries. It was shot over five weeks between March and April 1968 at Northeast High School in Philadelphia, Pennsylvania. The film was not shown in Philadelphia at the time of its release, because of Wiseman's concerns over what he called "vague talk" of a lawsuit.

The film was released in November 1968. High School has aired on PBS. Wiseman distributes his work (DVDs and 16mm prints) through Zipporah Films, which rents them to high schools, colleges, and libraries on a five-year long-term lease. High School was selected in 1991 for preservation in the National Film Registry.

In 1994, Wiseman released High School II, a second documentary on high school, based on Central Park East Secondary School in New York City.

== Reception and interpretation ==
Film critic David Denby, writing in the New York Review of Books, described High School as "a savagely comic portrait" of an urban high school in a period of emerging social unrest:

... [t]he movie was shot in 1968, and the school was then clearly attempting to hold off what it perceived as cultural anarchy outside its walls. Many of the teachers and administrators are exercising a bland and frightened dictatorship; their speech is deadened as if any sign of life might inspire the students to break out of control. Meanwhile, dull and demoralized by the teachers' inability to bring any subject to life, many of the best students are gathered in a class of malcontents where they sit in resentful torpor - they are also victims of the hypocrisy and authoritarianism promoted in the school ...

In his review for The A.V. Club, A.A. Dowd wrote that High School “is filthy with the kind of revealing behavior that a documentarian can only hope and pray to capture on camera”, concluding:

Beyond all the minute-by-minute highlights, High School accumulates a larger purpose. Wiseman seems to understand high school as a kind of audition for adulthood, and he sees in the faculty a knee-jerk attempt to program the student body—through the reinforcement of social norms, the encouragement to conform, and the strict insistence on obedience. What he discovers, too, in this cloistered academic setting, is a microcosm for the cultural warfare happening all over America in the late ’60s. High School gradually morphs into a quiet depiction of clashing generational values, with the instructors as torchbearers for a general worldview on the wane and the students as the voices of a new country being born in their image.

For The New Yorker, Pauline Kael wrote that the film was a "revelation" and that "Wiseman is probably the most sophisticated intelligence to enter the documentary field in years."

== See also ==
- List of American films of 1968
- List of films preserved in the United States National Film Registry
