= Amanda McKerrow =

American ballet dancer (born 1964)

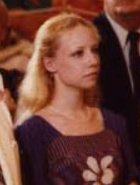
Amanda McKerrow, 1981

Amanda McKerrow (born 1964) is an American ballet dancer. She was a principal dancer with American Ballet Theatre (ABT) where she currently teaches. In 1981 she became the first American to win a gold medal at the Moscow International Ballet Competition when she was 17 years old.

== Early life and education ==
McKerrow was born in Albuquerque, New Mexico, the youngest child of a retired administrator at the National Institutes of Health. Her mother was a stay-at-home mom. She began taking ballet lessons at age seven and five years later won a scholarship to the Metropolitan Academy of Ballet in Bethesda, Maryland. After her sophomore year she dropped out of high school and joined The Washington Ballet (TWB).

== Career ==
McKerrow danced with The Washington Ballet for two years from 1980 to 1982. She joined American Ballet Theatre under the direction of Mikhail Baryshnikov in 1982. She was appointed Soloist in 1983 and Principal Dancer in 1987. She retired from performing in 2005.

In 2014 McKerrow began teaching and staging performances at ABT. She also teaches at Washington University and at dance festivals.

In addition to her ballet career, she has appeared in several films: ‘’Variety and Virtuosity: American Ballet Theatre Now (1998),’’ ‘’American Ballet Theatre at the Met (1984)’’ and ‘’Dancers (1987).’’

== Awards ==
McKerrow is the first American to receive a gold medal at the International Ballet Competition in Moscow which she won in 1981. McKerrow has also been the recipient of the Princess Grace Foundation Dance Fellowship in 1986, the Deane Sherman Award of Excellence in the Field of Dance, and the New York Woman Award for Dance.

== Personal ==
She is married to fellow ballet dancer, John Gardner, whom she met when they were both performing with ABT.
