= 2015 New York Film Critics Circle Awards =

81st New York Film Critics Circle Awards

81st NYFCC Awards

January 4, 2016

Best Picture:
Carol

The 81st New York Film Critics Circle Awards, honoring the best in film for 2015, were announced on December 2, 2015 and presented on January 4, 2016.

== Winners ==
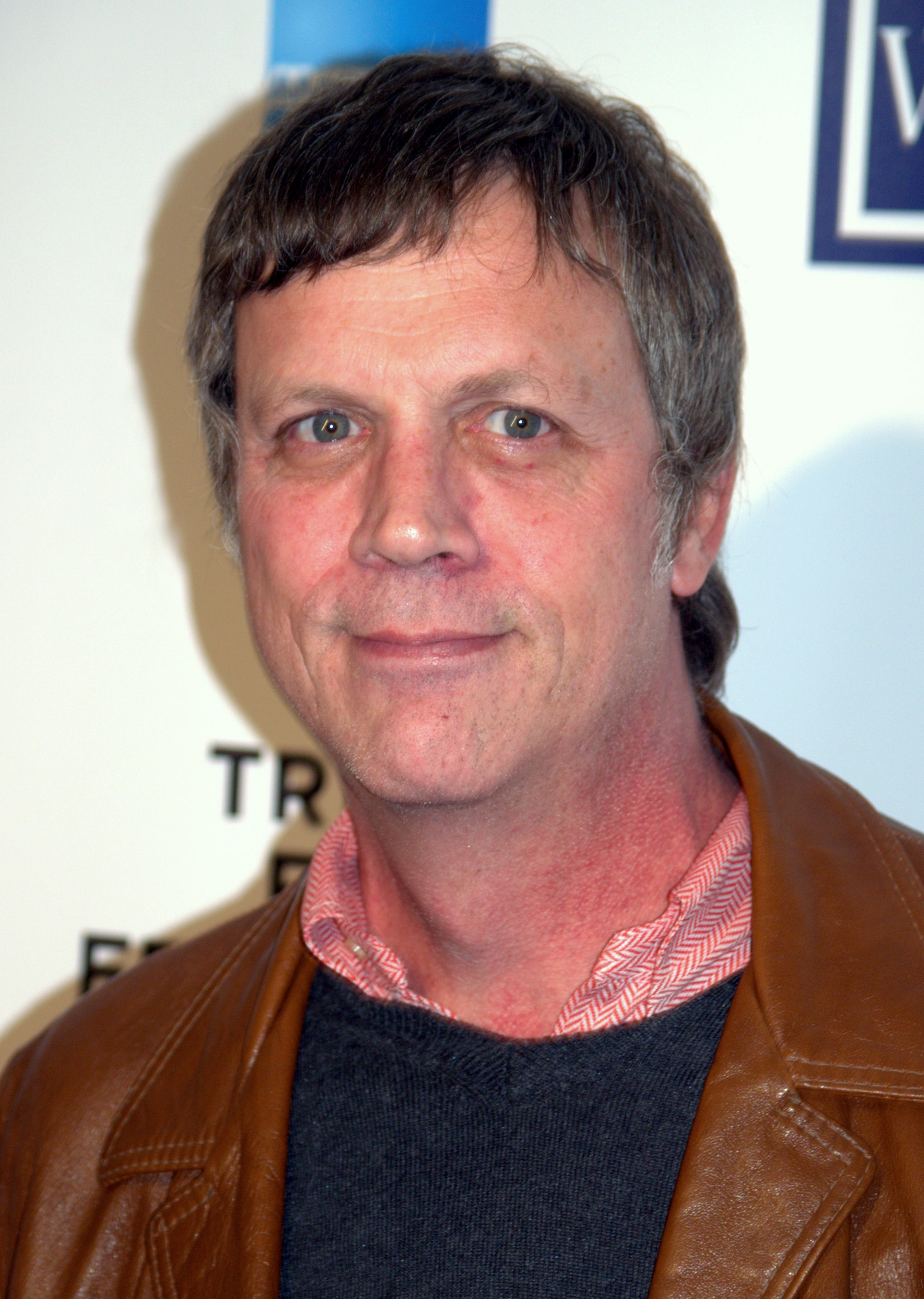
Todd Haynes, Best Director winner

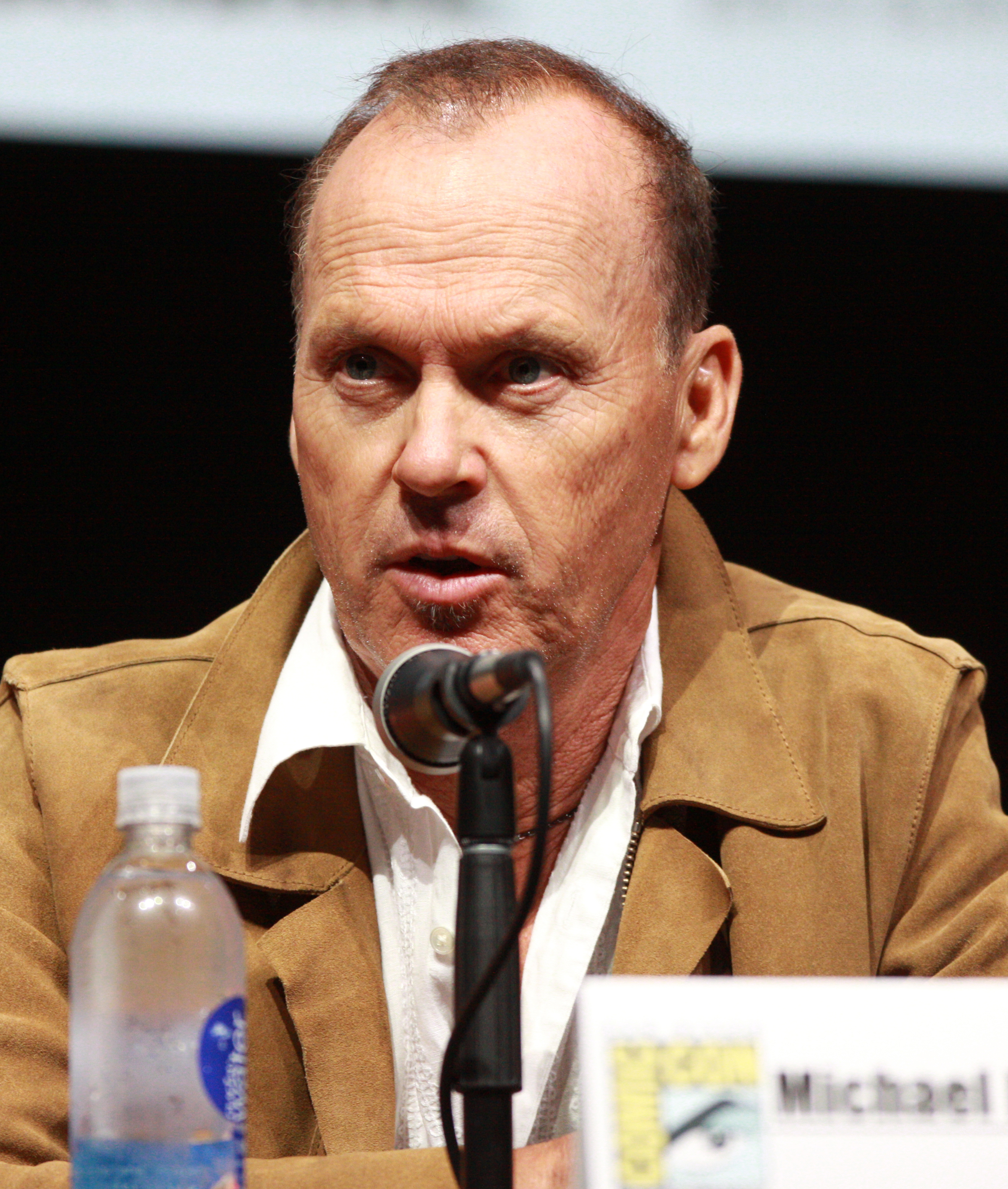
Michael Keaton, Best Actor winner

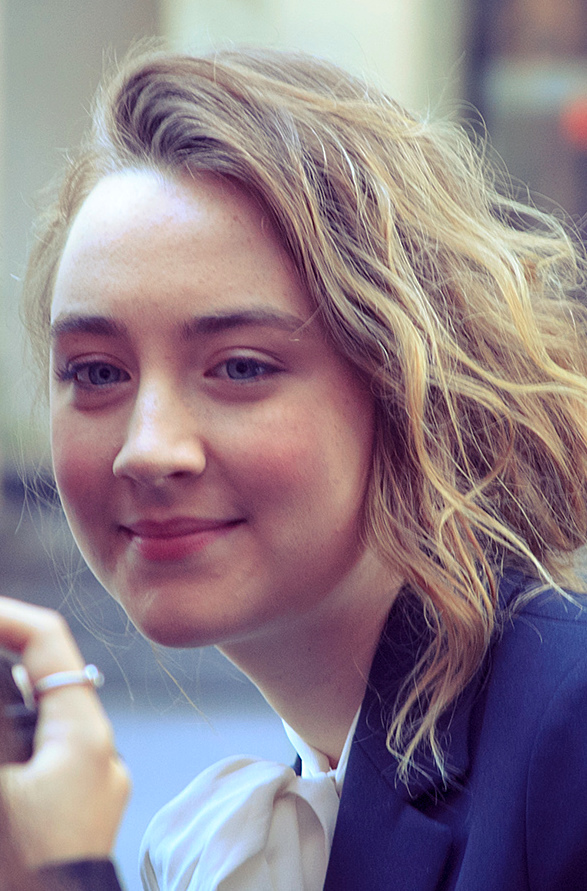
Saoirse Ronan, Best Actress winner

- Best Film:
  - Carol
- Best Director:
  - Todd Haynes – Carol
- Best Actor:
  - Michael Keaton – Spotlight
- Best Actress:
  - Saoirse Ronan – Brooklyn
- Best Supporting Actor:
  - Mark Rylance – Bridge of Spies
- Best Supporting Actress:
  - Kristen Stewart – Clouds of Sils Maria
- Best Screenplay:
  - Phyllis Nagy – Carol
- Best Animated Film:
  - Inside Out
- Best Cinematography:
  - Edward Lachman – Carol
- Best Non-Fiction Film:
  - In Jackson Heights
- Best Foreign Language Film:
  - Timbuktu • Mauritania
- Best First Film:
  - László Nemes – Son of Saul
- Special Award:
  - Ennio Morricone
