= Menus-Plaisirs – Les Troisgros =

2023 French documentary film

- International promotional poster
- Directed by: Frederick Wiseman
- Written by: Frederick Wiseman
- Cinematography: James Bishop
- Edited by: Frederick Wiseman
- Production company: Zipporah Films
- Distributed by: Météore Films (France)
- Release date: 9 September 2023 (Venice)
- Running time: 240 minutes
- Countries: France; United States
- Language: French

Menus-Plaisirs – Les Troisgros (lit. 'Lesser pleasures: (Note: The French term menus-plaisirs literally means "minor pleasures," and also puns on "menu". The Menus-Plaisirs du Roi was an organisation responsible for royal entertainments under the French Ancien Régime.) The Troisgros [family]'; French: [məny pleziʁ le tʁwaɡʁo]) is a 2023 French-language documentary film written and directed by Frederick Wiseman, in his final film before his death in February 2026. It follows the everyday activities of the French restaurant Le Bois sans feuilles.

The film had its world premiere out of competition at the 80th Venice International Film Festival on 9 September 2023. It received universal acclaim, being considered one of Wiseman's best works.

== Synopsis ==
The film focuses on the Troisgros family's Michelin 3-star restaurant "Le Bois sans feuilles" ('The Woods Without Leaves') and the farms which provide them the food, with more brief segments focusing on two other Troisgros' restaurants, Le Central and La Colline du Colombier.

Like Wiseman's other documentaries, the film uses cinema verité observational footage with no interviews, music, or voiceover narration.

== Production ==
The documentary was conceived in 2020, after Wiseman had lunch at the Troisgros restaurant and asked the chef to film a documentary without any prior planning. Filming took place with a four-person crew over 35 consecutive days in 2020.

== Release ==
It premiered out of competition at the 80th edition of the Venice Film Festival. It was later screened in other festivals, including the Toronto Film Festival, the Busan Film Festival, the New York Film Festival, the Tokyo International Film Festival, and the Sydney Film Festival.

== Reception ==
On the review aggregator website Rotten Tomatoes, 100% of 56 critics' reviews are positive, with an average rating of 8.6/10. The website's consensus reads: "Another patient, steadily absorbing triumph for Frederick Wiseman, Menus-Plaisirs: Les Troisgros pays delectable tribute to a talented family's culinary legacy." On Metacritic, the film holds a score of 91 out of 100, indicating "universal acclaim". The film was often described as a "masterpiece".

Manohla Dargis of The New York Times called the film "deeply pleasurable", praising Wiseman's "analytical and dialectical" approach. Both Variety and Eater noted the rhythmic nature of the film and described it as "mesmerizing".

=== Accolades ===
The film was awarded as Best Non-Fiction Film at the 2023 New York Film Critics Circle Awards, at the 2023 Los Angeles Film Critics Association Awards, and at the 2023 National Society of Film Critics Awards.

== See also ==
- List of films with a 100% rating on Rotten Tomatoes
