= Marlene (1984 film) =

1984 documentary film

- Theatrical release poster
- Directed by: Maximilian Schell
- Written by: Maximilian Schell; Meir Dohnal
- Produced by: Zev Braun; Karel Dirka
- Cinematography: Henry Hauck; Pavel Hispler; Ivan Slapeta
- Edited by: Heidi Genée; Dagmar Hirtz
- Music by: Nicolas Economou
- Production companies: Bayerischer Rundfunk; OKO-Film
- Distributed by: Futura Film
- Release dates: 13 January 1984 (Bavarian Film Festival); 2 March 1984 (West Germany)
- Running time: 94 minutes
- Country: West Germany
- Languages: English; German; French

Marlene (also known in Germany as Marlene Dietrich – Porträt eines Mythos) is a 1984 West German documentary film co-written and directed by Maximilian Schell about German-American actress Marlene Dietrich. It was produced by Bayerischer Rundfunk and OKO-Film and released by Futura Film in West Germany and by Alive Films in the United States.

== Background ==
Marlene Dietrich and Maximilian Schell had worked together on Judgment at Nuremberg in 1961. By the late 1970s, Dietrich had become a virtual recluse in her Paris apartment on the Avenue Montaigne. However, financial issues inspired her to develop a television documentary about her work. Her initial choice for a director, her friend Orson Welles, proved unavailable and after considering Welles' friend and fan of hers, Peter Bogdanovich, she eventually agreed to have Schell direct—primarily, it seems, because he spoke both German and English. In 1982, with Schell on board, she agreed to participate in what she intended to be a television documentary. Schell had other ideas and their sessions became a film.

Because Dietrich did not wish to be photographed, the film consists of an audio commentary and the visuals illustrating her career by showing film clips and stills from her films, as well as newsreel footage. She was contracted for "40 hours of interviews", as she reminds Schell during one of their exchanges. The film consists of voice interviews between Schell and Dietrich in which she often ignores his questions, makes acerbic comments about, among other things, some of the books written about her life and films. She resists Schell's attempts to criticize those she knew in her life asking him, "Why must we say critical things?" During their discussions, she touches on the subjects of life and death, reality and illusion and the nature of stardom.

== Films featured ==
The film contains clips from the following films:

- Love Tragedy (1923)
- Nights of Love (1929)
- The Blue Angel (1930)
- Morocco (1930)
- Dishonored (1931)
- Blonde Venus (1932)
- The Scarlet Empress (1934)
- The Devil Is a Woman (1935)
- Desire (1936)
- Destry Rides Again (1939)
- Citizen Kane (1941)
- Stage Fright (1950)
- Witness for the Prosecution (1957)
- Touch of Evil (1958)
- Judgment at Nuremberg (1961)
- Just a Gigolo (1979)

== Accolades ==
The film was nominated for an Academy Award for Best Documentary Feature Film. It won the Best Production Award at the Bavarian Film Awards, the Outstanding Non-Feature Film at the German Film Awards and the Best Documentary Award from the New York Film Critics Circle Awards, the National Society of Film Critics Awards, USA and the Boston Society of Film Critics Awards.

Marlene was rankled by the raw and vulnerable portrayal of her, thinking it would be an ordinary documentary, and she did not speak to Schell for a year. However, she was won over by the glowing reviews of the film, and after it was nominated for an Academy Award, she reconciled with him.
