= List of accolades received by Carol (film) =

Carol accolades
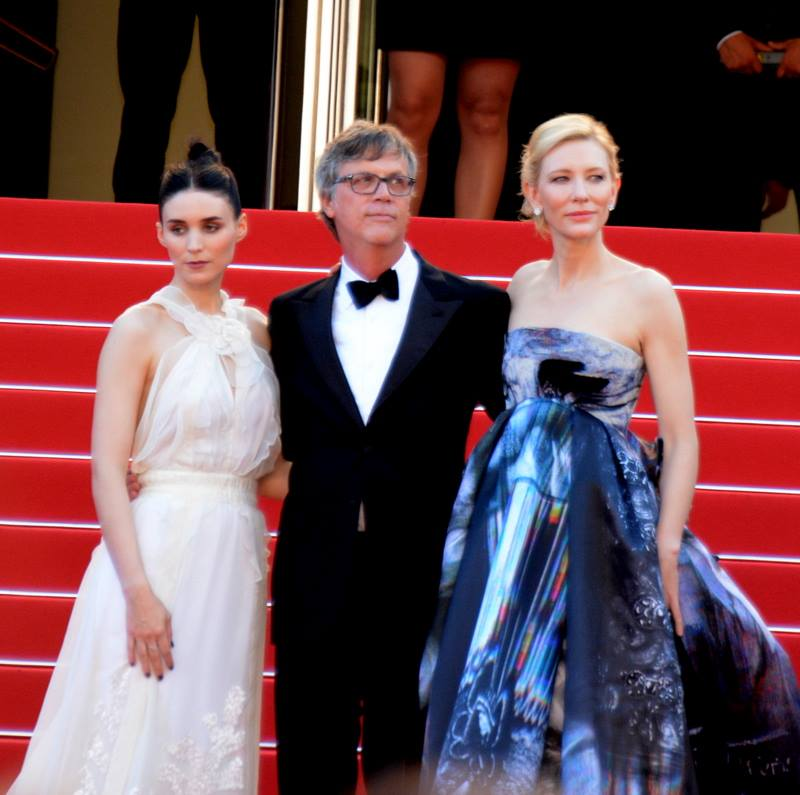
- Director Todd Haynes (center) and actresses Cate Blanchett (right) and Rooney Mara (left) received multiple accolades for their work in the film.
Awards and nominations
Award	Wins	Nominations
Golden Globe	0	5
Academy Awards	0	6
BAFTA Awards	0	9
Independent Spirit Awards	1	6
Los Angeles Film Critics Association	1	4
London Film Critics' Circle	1	7
National Society of Film Critics	2	3
New York Film Critics Circle Awards	5	5
Screen Actors Guild Awards	0	2

Totals (Note: Certain award groups do not simply award one winner. They acknowledge several different recipients, have runners-up, and have third place. Since this is a specific recognition and is different from losing an award, runner-up mentions are considered wins in this award tally. For simplification and to avoid errors, each award in this list has been presumed to have had a prior nomination.)
- Wins: 104
- Nominations: 294

Carol is a 2015 British-American romantic drama film directed by Todd Haynes, with a screenplay by Phyllis Nagy, based on Patricia Highsmith's 1952 romance novel The Price of Salt. The film stars Cate Blanchett and Rooney Mara as Carol Aird and Therese Belivet, two women from different social classes and backgrounds embarking on a lesbian relationship in early 1950s New York City. Sarah Paulson, Kyle Chandler, and Jake Lacy feature in supporting roles. Carol premiered at the 2015 Cannes Film Festival, where it won the Queer Palm and Mara tied for the Best Actress award.

The film received critical acclaim, particularly for Haynes' direction, Blanchett and Mara's performances, Edward Lachman's cinematography, Carter Burwell's score, and Sandy Powell's costumes. (Note: Critical reception:) It was Metacritic's best-reviewed film of 2015, and Rotten Tomatoes' best-reviewed romance film of the year. In 2016, the British Film Institute named Carol the best LGBT film of all time, as voted by more than 100 film experts, including critics, filmmakers, curators, academics, and programmers. The BBC also ranked Carol Number 69 of the best 100 films since the year 2000, as voted by 177 film critics from 36 countries.

Carol garnered many accolades from industry and critics organizations. It received six Academy Award nominations, including Best Actress, Best Supporting Actress, Best Cinematography, and Best Adapted Screenplay. It led the Golden Globe Award nominations with five, for Best Motion Picture – Drama, Best Actress for Blanchett and Mara, Best Director, and Best Original Score, and garnered nine BAFTA Award nominations, among them Best Film, Best Direction, Best Actress in a Leading Role, Best Actress in a Supporting Role, and Best Adapted Screenplay. At the 31st Independent Spirit Awards, the film won Best Cinematography out of six nominations, including Best Feature, Best Director, and Best Female Lead for Blanchett and Mara. The actresses also received Screen Actors Guild Award nominations for Outstanding Performance by a Female Actor in a Leading Role and Outstanding Performance by a Female Actor in a Supporting Role, respectively.

The American Film Institute selected Carol as one of its ten Movies of the Year. It won the Audience Award at the Whistler Film Festival, and the Chicago International Film Festival's Gold Q Hugo Award for exhibiting "new artistic perspectives on sexuality and identity". Lachman was awarded the grand prize for Best Cinematography by the Camerimage International Film Festival, and the London Film Critics' Circle Technical Achievement Award. The National Society of Film Critics and Boston Society of Film Critics awarded Haynes and Lachman Best Director and Best Cinematography. The New York Film Critics Circle awarded Carol Best Film, Best Director, Best Screenplay, and Best Cinematography, and the film won Best Music from the Los Angeles Film Critics Association. The film also received nine nominations from the Critics Choice Association, including Best Film, Best Director, Best Actress and Best Supporting Actress. Carol was named the Best International Literary Adaptation by the Frankfurt Book Fair.

== Accolades ==
Accolades received by Carol
Award	Date of ceremony	Category	Recipient(s)	Result	Ref(s)
AACTA Awards	January 29, 2016	Best Film	Carol	Nominated	
AACTA Awards	January 29, 2016	Best Direction	Todd Haynes	Nominated	
AACTA Awards	January 29, 2016	Best Screenplay	Phyllis Nagy	Nominated	
AACTA Awards	January 29, 2016	Best Actress	Cate Blanchett	Won	
AACTA Awards	January 29, 2016	Best Supporting Actress	Rooney Mara	Won	
AARP Movies For Grownups Awards	January 5, 2016	Best Director	Todd Haynes	Nominated	
AARP Movies For Grownups Awards	January 5, 2016	Best Grownup Love Story	Carol	Nominated	
AARP Movies For Grownups Awards	January 5, 2016	Best Time Capsule	Carol	Nominated	
Academy Awards	February 28, 2016	Best Actress	Cate Blanchett	Nominated	
Academy Awards	February 28, 2016	Best Supporting Actress	Rooney Mara	Nominated	
Academy Awards	February 28, 2016	Best Cinematography	Edward Lachman	Nominated	
Academy Awards	February 28, 2016	Best Adapted Screenplay	Phyllis Nagy	Nominated	
Academy Awards	February 28, 2016	Best Original Score	Carter Burwell	Nominated	
Academy Awards	February 28, 2016	Best Costume Design	Sandy Powell	Nominated	
Alliance of Women Film Journalists	January 13, 2016	Best Film	Carol	Nominated	
Alliance of Women Film Journalists	January 13, 2016	Best Director	Todd Haynes	Nominated	
Alliance of Women Film Journalists	January 13, 2016	Best Actress	Cate Blanchett	Nominated	
Alliance of Women Film Journalists	January 13, 2016	Best Supporting Actress	Rooney Mara	Nominated	
Alliance of Women Film Journalists	January 13, 2016	Best Adapted Screenplay	Phyllis Nagy	Won	
Alliance of Women Film Journalists	January 13, 2016	Best Cinematography	Edward Lachman	Won	
Alliance of Women Film Journalists	January 13, 2016	Best Film Music or Score	Carter Burwell	Nominated	
Alliance of Women Film Journalists	January 13, 2016	Best Woman Screenwriter	Phyllis Nagy	Nominated	
Alliance of Women Film Journalists	January 13, 2016	Best Depiction of Nudity, Sexuality, or Seduction	Carol	Won	
American Society of Cinematographers	February 14, 2016	Outstanding Achievement in Cinematography in Theatrical Releases	Edward Lachman	Nominated	
Apolo Awards	January 13, 2017	Best Film	Carol	Won	
Apolo Awards	January 13, 2017	Best Director	Todd Haynes	Won	
Apolo Awards	January 13, 2017	Best Adapted Screenplay	Phyllis Nagy	Won	
Apolo Awards	January 13, 2017	Best Cinematography	Edward Lachman	Won	
Apolo Awards	January 13, 2017	Best Costuming	Sandy Powell	Nominated	
Apolo Awards	January 13, 2017	Best Hair and Make-Up	Jerry DeCarlo, Patricia Regan	Nominated	
Apolo Awards	January 13, 2017	Best Original Music	Carter Burwell	Won	
Apolo Awards	January 13, 2017	Best Actress	Rooney Mara	Won	
Apolo Awards	January 13, 2017	Best Actress	Cate Blanchett	Nominated	
Apolo Awards	January 13, 2017	Best Couple	Rooney Mara and Cate Blanchett	Nominated	
Artios Awards	January 21, 2016	Studio or Independent – Drama	Laura Rosenthal, Maribeth Fox (Associate), Jodi Angstreich (Associate)	Nominated	
Austin Film Critics Association	December 29, 2015	Best Film	Carol	Nominated	
Austin Film Critics Association	December 29, 2015	Top Ten Films	Carol	Won	
Austin Film Critics Association	December 29, 2015	Best Director	Todd Haynes	Nominated	
Austin Film Critics Association	December 29, 2015	Best Actress	Cate Blanchett	Nominated	
Austin Film Critics Association	December 29, 2015	Best Actress	Rooney Mara	Nominated	
Austin Film Critics Association	December 29, 2015	Best Adapted Screenplay	Phyllis Nagy	Nominated	
Austin Film Critics Association	December 29, 2015	Best Cinematography	Edward Lachman	Won	
Austin Film Critics Association	December 29, 2015	Best Score	Carter Burwell	Nominated	
Belgian Film Critics Association	January 7, 2017	Grand Prix	Carol	Won	
Boston Society of Film Critics	December 11, 2015	Best Director	Todd Haynes	Won	
Boston Society of Film Critics	December 11, 2015	Best Screenplay	Phyllis Nagy	Runner-up	
Boston Society of Film Critics	December 11, 2015	Best Cinematography	Edward Lachman	Won	
British Academy Film Awards	February 14, 2016	Best Film	Carol	Nominated	
British Academy Film Awards	February 14, 2016	Best Direction	Todd Haynes	Nominated	
British Academy Film Awards	February 14, 2016	Best Actress in a Leading Role	Cate Blanchett	Nominated	
British Academy Film Awards	February 14, 2016	Best Actress in a Supporting Role	Rooney Mara	Nominated	
British Academy Film Awards	February 14, 2016	Best Adapted Screenplay	Phyllis Nagy	Nominated	
British Academy Film Awards	February 14, 2016	Best Cinematography	Edward Lachman	Nominated	
British Academy Film Awards	February 14, 2016	Best Production Design	Judy Becker, Heather Loeffler	Nominated	
British Academy Film Awards	February 14, 2016	Best Costume Design	Sandy Powell	Nominated	
British Academy Film Awards	February 14, 2016	Best Makeup and Hair	Jerry DeCarlo, Patricia Regan	Nominated	
British Independent Film Awards	November 3, 2015	Best International Independent Film	Carol	Nominated	
Camerimage	November 21, 2015	Golden Frog for Best Cinematography	Edward Lachman	Won	
Cannes Film Festival	May 24, 2015	Palme d’Or	Todd Haynes	Nominated	
Cannes Film Festival	May 24, 2015	Best Actress	Rooney Mara	Won (Note: Tied with Emmanuelle Bercot for Mon Roi)	
Cannes Film Festival	May 24, 2015	Queer Palm	Carol	Won	
Chicago Film Critics Association	December 16, 2015	Best Picture	Carol	Nominated	
Chicago Film Critics Association	December 16, 2015	Best Director	Todd Haynes	Nominated	
Chicago Film Critics Association	December 16, 2015	Best Actress	Cate Blanchett	Nominated	
Chicago Film Critics Association	December 16, 2015	Best Cinematography	Edward Lachman	Nominated	
Chicago Film Critics Association	December 16, 2015	Best Score	Carter Burwell	Nominated	
Chicago Film Critics Association	December 16, 2015	Best Art Direction	Carol	Nominated	
Chicago International Film Festival	October 23, 2015	Gold Q Hugo	Carol	Won	
Cinema for Peace	February 15, 2016	Most Valuable Film of the Year	Carol	Nominated	
Costume Designers Guild	February 23, 2016	Excellence in Period Film	Sandy Powell	Nominated	
Critics' Choice Movie Awards	January 17, 2016	Best Film	Carol	Nominated	
Critics' Choice Movie Awards	January 17, 2016	Best Director	Todd Haynes	Nominated	
Critics' Choice Movie Awards	January 17, 2016	Best Actress	Cate Blanchett	Nominated	
Critics' Choice Movie Awards	January 17, 2016	Best Supporting Actress	Rooney Mara	Nominated	
Critics' Choice Movie Awards	January 17, 2016	Best Score	Carter Burwell	Nominated	
Critics' Choice Movie Awards	January 17, 2016	Best Cinematography	Edward Lachman	Nominated	
Critics' Choice Movie Awards	January 17, 2016	Best Costume Design	Sandy Powell	Nominated	
Critics' Choice Movie Awards	January 17, 2016	Best Hair and Makeup	Jerry DeCarlo, Patricia Regan	Nominated	
Critics' Choice Movie Awards	January 17, 2016	Best Production Design	Judy Becker, Heather Loeffler	Nominated	
Dallas–Fort Worth Film Critics Association	December 14, 2015	Best Director	Todd Haynes	Nominated	
Dallas–Fort Worth Film Critics Association	December 14, 2015	Best Actress	Cate Blanchett	Runner-up	
Dallas–Fort Worth Film Critics Association	December 14, 2015	Best Supporting Actress	Rooney Mara	Won	
Dallas–Fort Worth Film Critics Association	December 14, 2015	Best Cinematography	Edward Lachman	Runner-up	
David di Donatello	April 18, 2016	Best Foreign Film	Carol	Nominated	
Detroit Film Critics Society	December 14, 2015	Best Actress	Cate Blanchett	Nominated	
Dorian Awards	January 18, 2016	Film of the Year	Carol	Won	
Dorian Awards	January 18, 2016	Director of the Year	Todd Haynes	Won	
Dorian Awards	January 18, 2016	Film Performance of the Year – Actress	Cate Blanchett	Won	
Dorian Awards	January 18, 2016	Film Performance of the Year – Actress	Rooney Mara	Nominated	
Dorian Awards	January 18, 2016	LGBTQ Film of the Year	Carol	Won	
Dorian Awards	January 18, 2016	Screenplay of the Year	Phyllis Nagy	Won	
Dorian Awards	January 18, 2016	Visually Striking Film of the Year	Carol	Nominated	
Empire Awards	March 20, 2016	Best Costume Design	Sandy Powell	Nominated	
Film Fest Gent	October 26, 2015	Canvas Audience Award	Carol	Won	
Florida Film Critics Circle	December 23, 2015	Best Picture	Carol	Nominated	
Florida Film Critics Circle	December 23, 2015	Best Director	Todd Haynes	Runner-up	
Florida Film Critics Circle	December 23, 2015	Best Actress	Cate Blanchett	Nominated	
Florida Film Critics Circle	December 23, 2015	Best Supporting Actress	Rooney Mara	Nominated	
Florida Film Critics Circle	December 23, 2015	Best Adapted Screenplay	Phyllis Nagy	Runner-up	
Florida Film Critics Circle	December 23, 2015	Best Cinematography	Edward Lachman	Runner-up	
Florida Film Critics Circle	December 23, 2015	Best Art Direction/Production Design	Judy Becker, Heather Loeffler	Won	
Florida Film Critics Circle	December 23, 2015	Best Score	Carter Burwell	Runner-up	
Frankfurt Book Fair	October 21, 2015	Best International Literary Adaptation	Carol	Won	
GLAAD Media Awards	April 2, 2016	Outstanding Film – Wide Release	Carol	Won	
Golden Globe Awards	January 10, 2016	Best Motion Picture – Drama	Carol	Nominated	
Golden Globe Awards	January 10, 2016	Best Director	Todd Haynes	Nominated	
Golden Globe Awards	January 10, 2016	Best Actress in a Motion Picture – Drama	Cate Blanchett	Nominated	
Golden Globe Awards	January 10, 2016	Best Actress in a Motion Picture – Drama	Rooney Mara	Nominated	
Golden Globe Awards	January 10, 2016	Best Original Score	Carter Burwell	Nominated	
Gotham Awards	November 30, 2015	Best Feature	Carol	Nominated	
Gotham Awards	November 30, 2015	Best Screenplay	Phyllis Nagy	Nominated	
Gotham Awards	November 30, 2015	Best Actress	Cate Blanchett	Nominated	
Guldbagge Awards	January 18, 2016	Best Foreign Film	Carol	Nominated	
Hollywood Music in Media Awards	November 11, 2015	Original Score – Feature Film	Carter Burwell	Nominated	
Houston Film Critics Society	January 9, 2016	Best Performance by an Actress in a Leading Role	Cate Blanchett	Nominated	
Houston Film Critics Society	January 9, 2016	Best Performance by an Actress in a Supporting Role	Rooney Mara	Won	
Independent Spirit Awards	February 27, 2016	Best Feature	Carol	Nominated	
Independent Spirit Awards	February 27, 2016	Best Director	Todd Haynes	Nominated	
Independent Spirit Awards	February 27, 2016	Best Screenplay	Phyllis Nagy	Nominated	
Independent Spirit Awards	February 27, 2016	Best Female Lead	Cate Blanchett	Nominated	
Independent Spirit Awards	February 27, 2016	Best Female Lead	Rooney Mara	Nominated	
Independent Spirit Awards	February 27, 2016	Best Cinematography	Edward Lachman	Won	
Irish Film & Television Academy	April 9, 2016	Best International Actress	Cate Blanchett	Nominated	
London Film Critics' Circle	January 17, 2016	Film of the Year	Carol	Nominated	
London Film Critics' Circle	January 17, 2016	Director of the Year	Todd Haynes	Nominated	
London Film Critics' Circle	January 17, 2016	Actress of the Year	Cate Blanchett	Nominated	
London Film Critics' Circle	January 17, 2016	Actress of the Year	Rooney Mara	Nominated	
London Film Critics' Circle	January 17, 2016	Screenwriter of the Year	Phyllis Nagy	Nominated	
London Film Critics' Circle	January 17, 2016	Technical Achievement Award	Carter Burwell (music)	Nominated	
London Film Critics' Circle	January 17, 2016	Technical Achievement Award	Edward Lachman (cinematography)	Won	
Los Angeles Film Critics Association	December 6, 2015	Best Director	Todd Haynes	Runner-up	
Los Angeles Film Critics Association	December 6, 2015	Best Cinematography	Edward Lachman	Runner-up	
Los Angeles Film Critics Association	December 6, 2015	Best Music	Carter Burwell	Won	
Los Angeles Film Critics Association	December 6, 2015	Best Production Design	Judy Becker, Heather Loeffler	Runner-up	
National Society of Film Critics	January 3, 2016	Best Picture	Carol	Runner-up	
National Society of Film Critics	January 3, 2016	Best Director	Todd Haynes	Won	
National Society of Film Critics	January 3, 2016	Best Cinematography	Edward Lachman	Won	
New York Film Critics Circle	December 2, 2015	Best Film	Carol	Won	
New York Film Critics Circle	December 2, 2015	Best Director	Todd Haynes	Won	
New York Film Critics Circle	December 2, 2015	Best Screenplay	Phyllis Nagy	Won	
New York Film Critics Circle	December 2, 2015	Best Cinematography	Edward Lachman	Won	
New York Film Critics Online	December 6, 2015	Best Supporting Actress	Rooney Mara	Won	
Online Film Critics Society	December 14, 2015	Best Picture	Carol	Nominated	
Online Film Critics Society	December 14, 2015	Best Director	Todd Haynes	Nominated	
Online Film Critics Society	December 14, 2015	Best Actress	Cate Blanchett	Won	
Online Film Critics Society	December 14, 2015	Best Supporting Actress	Rooney Mara	Won	
Online Film Critics Society	December 14, 2015	Best Adapted Screenplay	Phyllis Nagy	Won	
Online Film Critics Society	December 14, 2015	Best Cinematography	Edward Lachman	Nominated	
Palm Springs International Film Festival	January 2, 2016	Desert Palm Achievement Award, Actress	Cate Blanchett	Won	
Palm Springs International Film Festival	January 2, 2016	Spotlight Award, Actress	Rooney Mara	Won	
San Francisco Film Critics Circle	December 12, 2015	Best Picture	Carol	Nominated	
San Francisco Film Critics Circle	December 12, 2015	Best Director	Todd Haynes	Nominated	
San Francisco Film Critics Circle	December 12, 2015	Best Actress	Cate Blanchett	Nominated	
San Francisco Film Critics Circle	December 12, 2015	Best Actress	Rooney Mara	Nominated	
San Francisco Film Critics Circle	December 12, 2015	Best Adapted Screenplay	Phyllis Nagy	Nominated	
San Francisco Film Critics Circle	December 12, 2015	Best Cinematography	Edward Lachman	Nominated	
San Francisco Film Critics Circle	December 12, 2015	Best Production Design	Judy Becker, Heather Loeffler	Won	
Satellite Awards	February 21, 2016	Best Film	Carol	Nominated	
Satellite Awards	February 21, 2016	Best Editing	Affonso Gonçalves	Nominated	
Satellite Awards	February 21, 2016	Best Actress	Cate Blanchett	Nominated	
Satellite Awards	February 21, 2016	Best Supporting Actress	Rooney Mara	Nominated	
Satellite Awards	February 21, 2016	Best Original Score	Carter Burwell	Won	
Screen Actors Guild Awards	January 30, 2016	Outstanding Performance by a Female Actor in a Leading Role	Cate Blanchett	Nominated	
Screen Actors Guild Awards	January 30, 2016	Outstanding Performance by a Female Actor in a Supporting Role	Rooney Mara	Nominated	
Silver Condor Award	August 7, 2017	Best Foreign Film	Carol	Won	
St. Louis Film Critics Association	December 14, 2015	Best Director	Todd Haynes	Nominated	
St. Louis Film Critics Association	December 14, 2015	Best Actress	Cate Blanchett	Nominated	
St. Louis Film Critics Association	December 14, 2015	Best Supporting Actress	Rooney Mara	Nominated	
St. Louis Film Critics Association	December 14, 2015	Best Cinematography	Edward Lachman	Nominated	
St. Louis Film Critics Association	December 14, 2015	Best Art Direction	Judy Becker, Heather Loeffler	Nominated	
St. Louis Film Critics Association	December 14, 2015	Best Score	Carter Burwell	Nominated	
Toronto Film Critics Association	December 14, 2015	Best Film	Carol	Won	
Toronto Film Critics Association	December 14, 2015	Best Director	Todd Haynes	Won	
Vancouver Film Critics Circle	December 14, 2015	Best Director	Todd Haynes	Nominated	
Vancouver Film Critics Circle	December 14, 2015	Best Actress	Cate Blanchett	Nominated	
Washington D.C. Area Film Critics Association	December 8, 2015	Best Director	Todd Haynes	Nominated	
Washington D.C. Area Film Critics Association	December 8, 2015	Best Actress	Cate Blanchett	Nominated	
Washington D.C. Area Film Critics Association	December 8, 2015	Best Supporting Actress	Rooney Mara	Nominated	
Washington D.C. Area Film Critics Association	December 8, 2015	Best Adapted Screenplay	Phyllis Nagy	Nominated	
Washington D.C. Area Film Critics Association	December 8, 2015	Best Production Design	Judy Becker (Production Designer), Heather Loeffler (Set Decorator)	Nominated	
Washington D.C. Area Film Critics Association	December 8, 2015	Best Cinematography	Edward Lachman	Nominated	
Washington D.C. Area Film Critics Association	December 8, 2015	Best Original Score	Carter Burwell	Nominated	
Whistler Film Festival	December 7, 2015	Pandora Audience Award	Carol	Won	
Women Film Critics Circle	December 17, 2015	Best Woman Storyteller	Phyllis Nagy	Won	
World Soundtrack Academy	October 19, 2016	Public Choice Award for the Best Score of the Year	Carol, Carter Burwell	Won	
Writers Guild of America Awards	February 13, 2016	Best Adapted Screenplay	Phyllis Nagy	Nominated	

== See also ==
- 2015 in film
