= Washington D.C. Area Film Critics Association Awards 2015 =

Annual US film awards ceremony

14th WAFCA Awards
- Date: December 7, 2015

Highlights
- Best Film: Spotlight
- Best Director: George Miller for Mad Max: Fury Road
- Best Actor: Leonardo DiCaprio
- Best Actress: Saoirse Ronan

The 14th Washington D.C. Area Film Critics Association Awards were announced on December 7, 2015.

== Winners and nominees ==
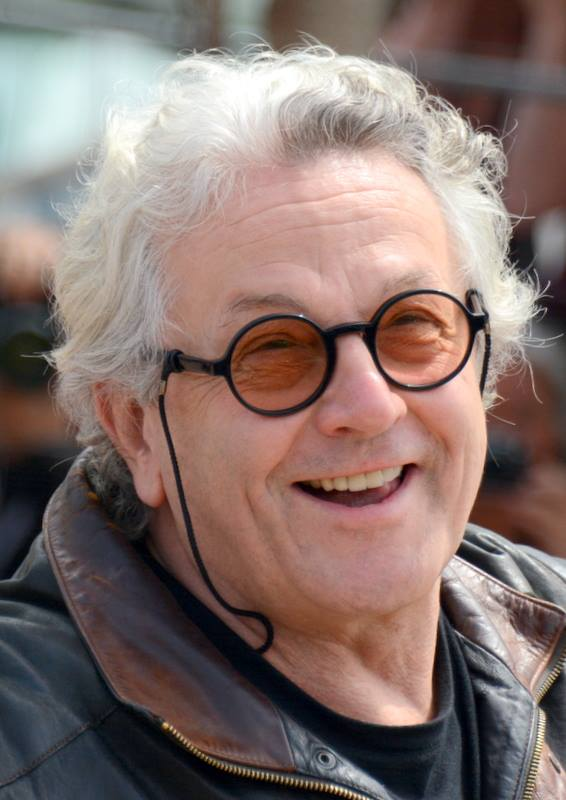
George Miller, Best Director winner

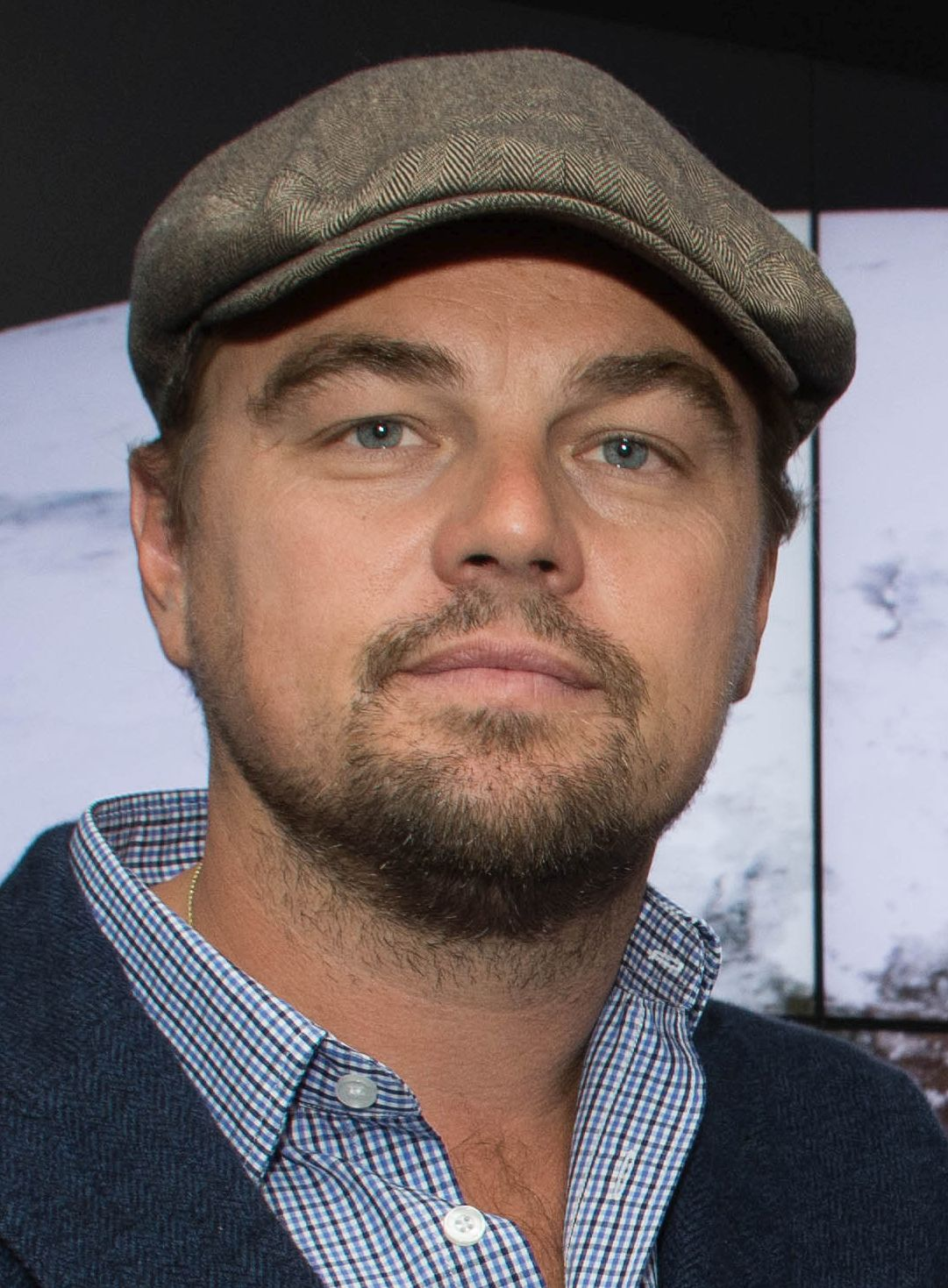
Leonardo DiCaprio, Best Actor winner

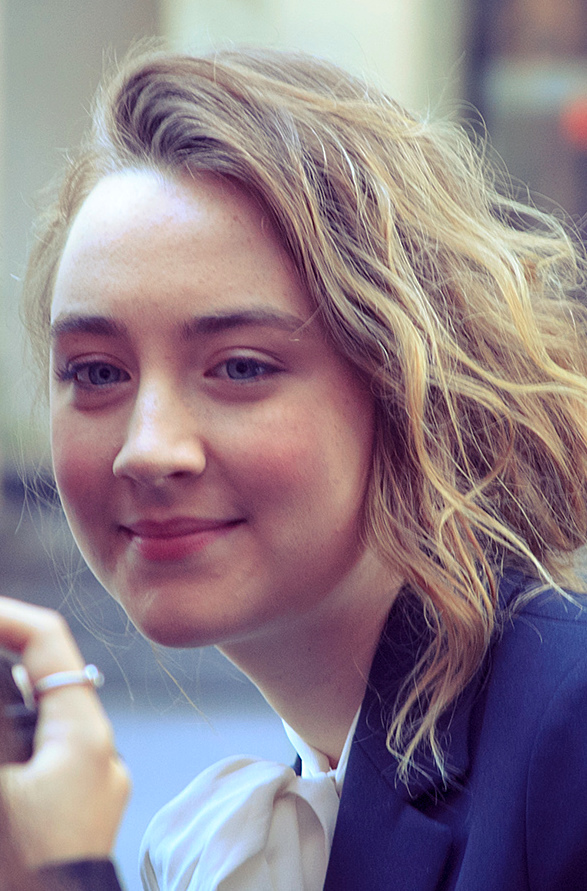
Saoirse Ronan, Best Actress winner

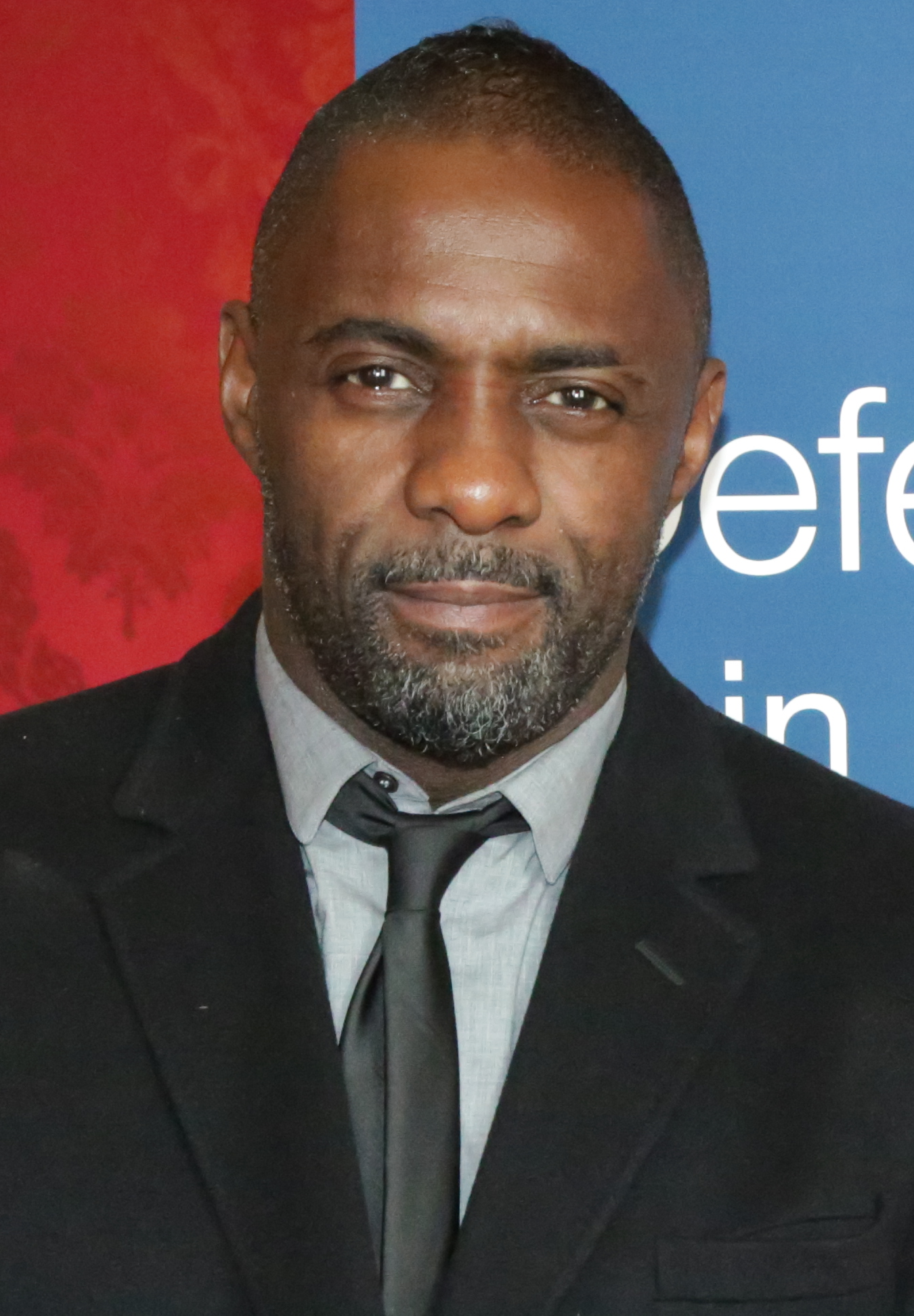
Idris Elba, Best Supporting Actor winner

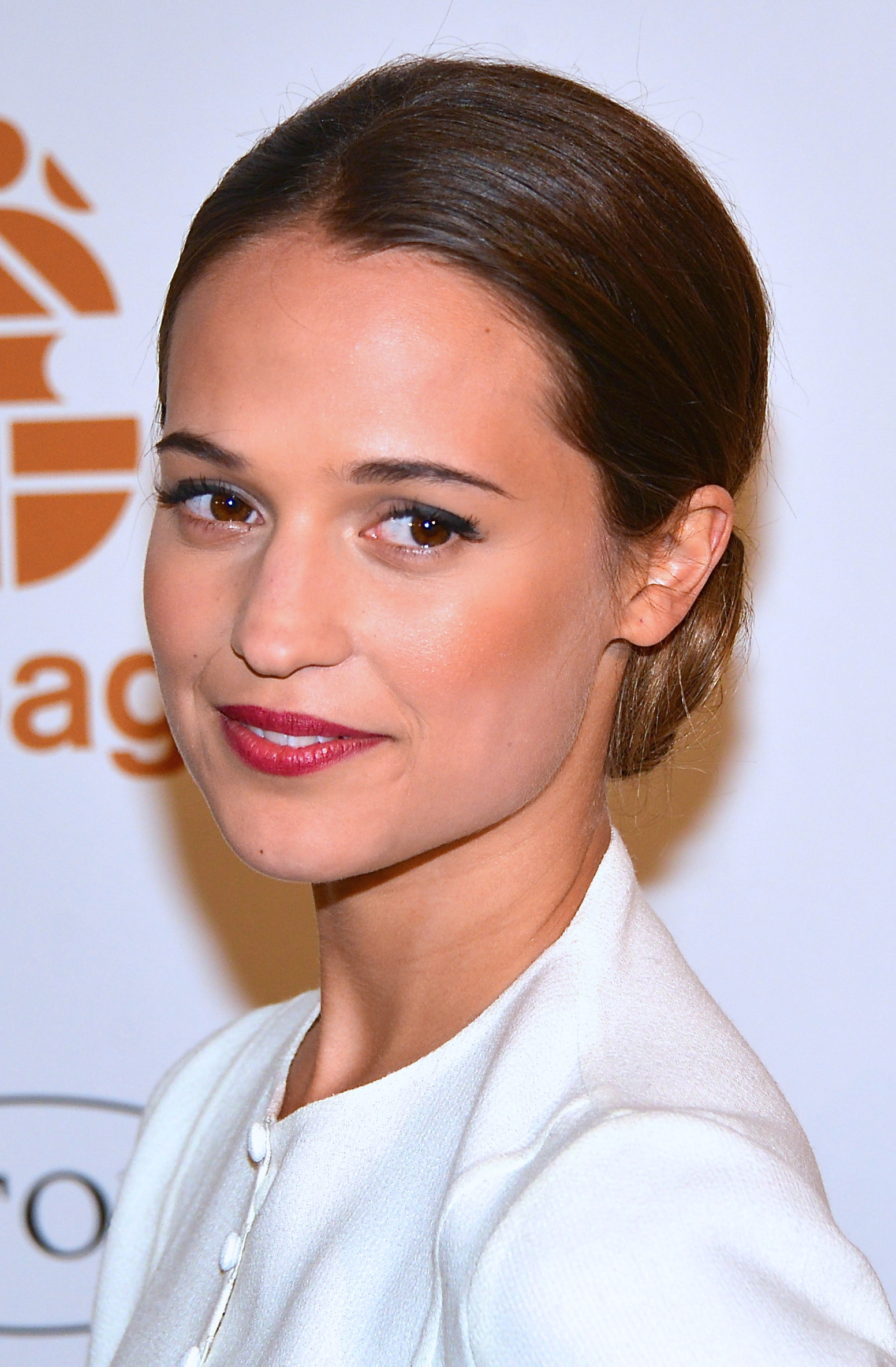
Alicia Vikander, Best Supporting Actress winner

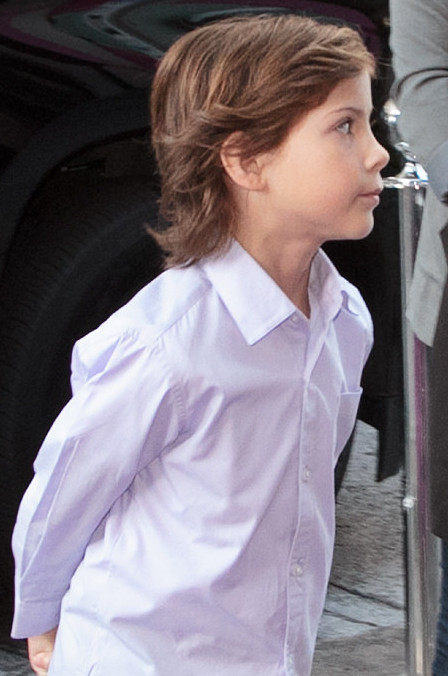
Jacob Tremblay, Best Youth Performance winner

Best Film

- Spotlight

- Brooklyn
- Mad Max: Fury Road
- The Revenant
- Sicario

Best Director

- George Miller – Mad Max: Fury Road

- Alex Garland – Ex Machina
- Todd Haynes – Carol
- Alejandro G. Iñárritu – The Revenant
- Ridley Scott – The Martian

Best Actor

- Leonardo DiCaprio – The Revenant

- Matt Damon – The Martian
- Johnny Depp – Black Mass
- Michael Fassbender – Steve Jobs
- Eddie Redmayne – The Danish Girl

Best Actress

- Saoirse Ronan – Brooklyn

- Cate Blanchett – Carol
- Brie Larson – Room
- Sarah Silverman – I Smile Back
- Charlize Theron – Mad Max: Fury Road

Best Supporting Actor

- Idris Elba – Beasts of No Nation

- Paul Dano – Love & Mercy
- Tom Hardy – The Revenant
- Mark Rylance – Bridge of Spies
- Sylvester Stallone – Creed

Best Supporting Actress

- Alicia Vikander – Ex Machina

- Jennifer Jason Leigh – The Hateful Eight
- Rooney Mara – Carol
- Alicia Vikander – The Danish Girl
- Kate Winslet – Steve Jobs

Best Adapted Screenplay

- Emma Donoghue – Room

- Drew Goddard – The Martian
- Nick Hornby – Brooklyn
- Phyllis Nagy – Carol
- Aaron Sorkin – Steve Jobs

Best Original Screenplay

- Pete Docter, Meg LeFauve, and Josh Cooley (original story by Pete Docter and Ronnie del Carmen) – Inside Out

- Matt Charman, Ethan Coen, and Joel Coen – Bridge of Spies
- Alex Garland – Ex Machina
- Tom McCarthy and Josh Singer – Spotlight
- Amy Schumer – Trainwreck

Best Ensemble

- Spotlight

- The Big Short
- The Hateful Eight
- Steve Jobs
- Straight Outta Compton

Best Animated Film

- Inside Out

- Anomalisa
- The Good Dinosaur
- The Peanuts Movie
- Shaun the Sheep Movie

Best Documentary Film

- Amy

- Best of Enemies
- Cartel Land
- Going Clear
- The Look of Silence

Best Foreign Language Film

- Son of Saul • Hungary

- The Assassin • Taiwan
- Goodnight Mommy • Austria
- Mustang • France
- The Second Mother • Brazil

Best Art Direction

- Colin Gibson and Lisa Thompson – Mad Max: Fury Road

- Judy Becker and Heather Loeffler – Carol
- Dante Ferretti and Francesca Lo Schiavo – Cinderella
- Jeff Melvin, Thomas E. Sanders, and Shane Vieau – Crimson Peak
- Jenny Oman, François Séguin, and Louise Tremblay – Brooklyn

Best Cinematography

- Emmanuel Lubezki – The Revenant

- Yves Bélanger – Brooklyn
- Roger Deakins – Sicario
- Edward Lachman – Carol
- John Seale – Mad Max: Fury Road

Best Editing

- Margaret Sixel – Mad Max: Fury Road

- Elliot Graham – Steve Jobs
- Stephen Mirrione – The Revenant
- Pietro Scalia – The Martian
- Joe Walker – Sicario

Best Original Score

- Jóhann Jóhannsson – Sicario

- Michael Brook – Brooklyn
- Carter Burwell – Carol
- Tom Holkenborg (aka Junkie XL) – Mad Max: Fury Road
- Ennio Morricone – The Hateful Eight

Best Youth Performance

- Jacob Tremblay – Room

- Abraham Attah – Beasts of No Nation
- Raffey Cassidy – Tomorrowland
- Oona Laurence – Southpaw
- Güneş Şensoy – Mustang

== Multiple nominations and awards ==
These films had multiple nominations:

- 7 nominations: Carol and Mad Max: Fury Road
- 6 nominations: Brooklyn and The Revenant
- 5 nominations: Steve Jobs
- 4 nominations: The Martian and Sicario
- 3 nominations: Ex Machina, The Hateful Eight, Room, and Spotlight
- 2 nominations: Bridge of Spies, The Danish Girl, and Inside Out

The following films received multiple awards:

- 3 wins: Mad Max: Fury Road
- 2 wins: Inside Out, The Revenant, Room, and Spotlight
