= San Francisco Film Critics Circle Awards 2015 =

Annual US film awards ceremony

14th SFFCC Awards

December 12, 2015

Picture:
Spotlight

Animated Feature:
Anomalisa

Documentary:
Listen to Me Marlon

Foreign Language Picture:
Son of Saul

The 14th San Francisco Film Critics Circle Awards, honoring the best in film for 2015, were given on December 12, 2015.

== Winners ==
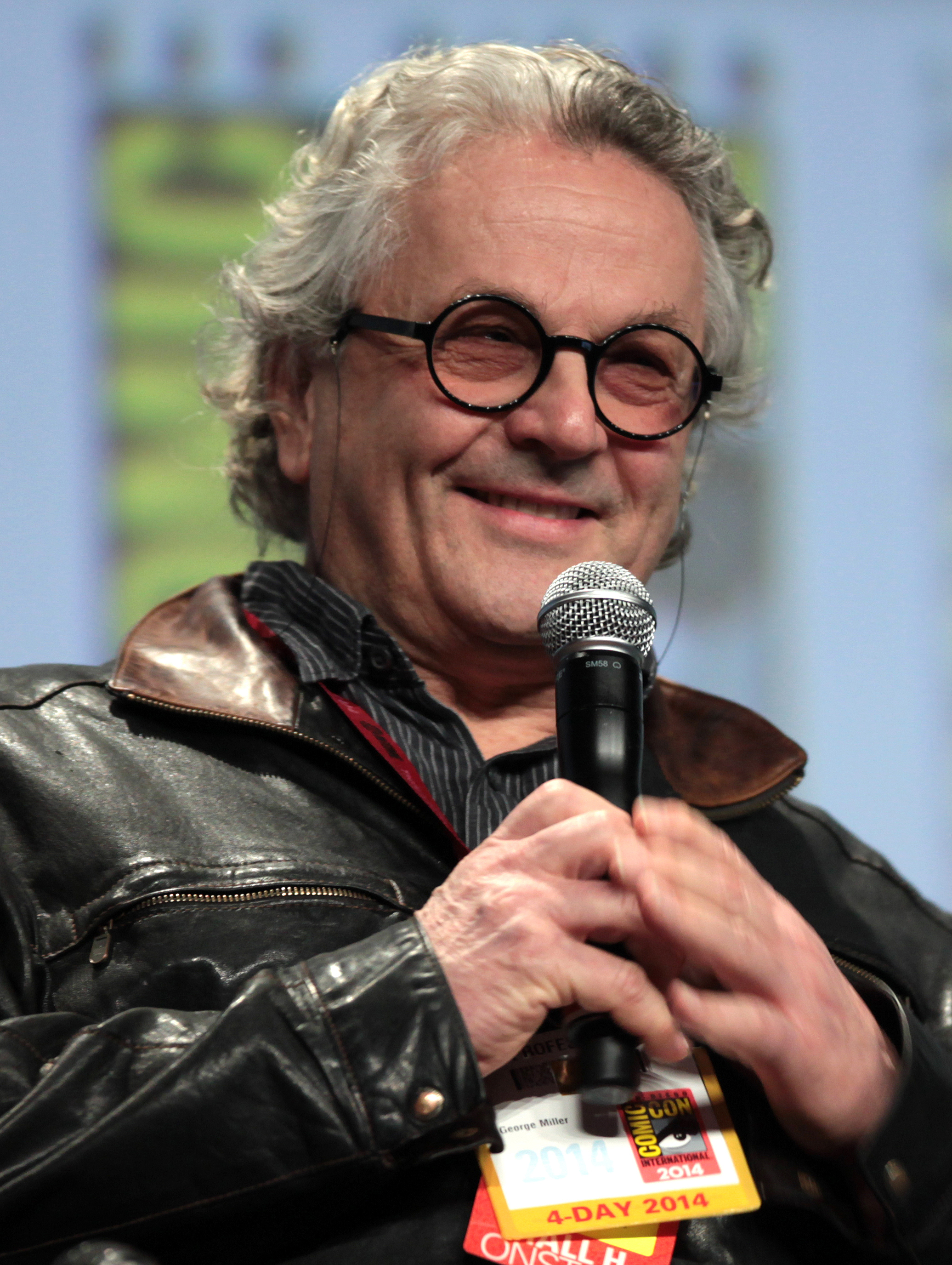
George Miller, Best Director winner

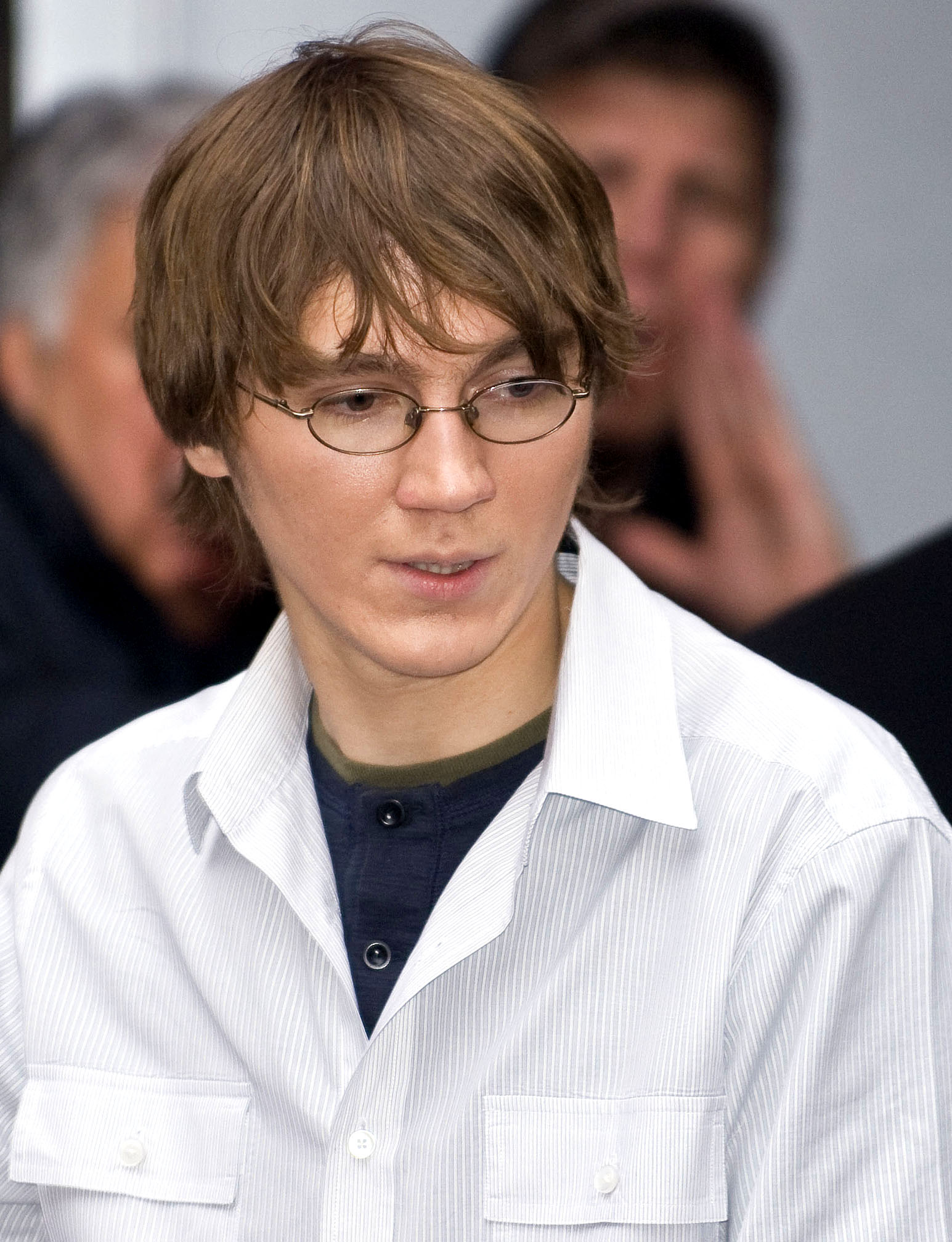
Paul Dano, Best Actor winner

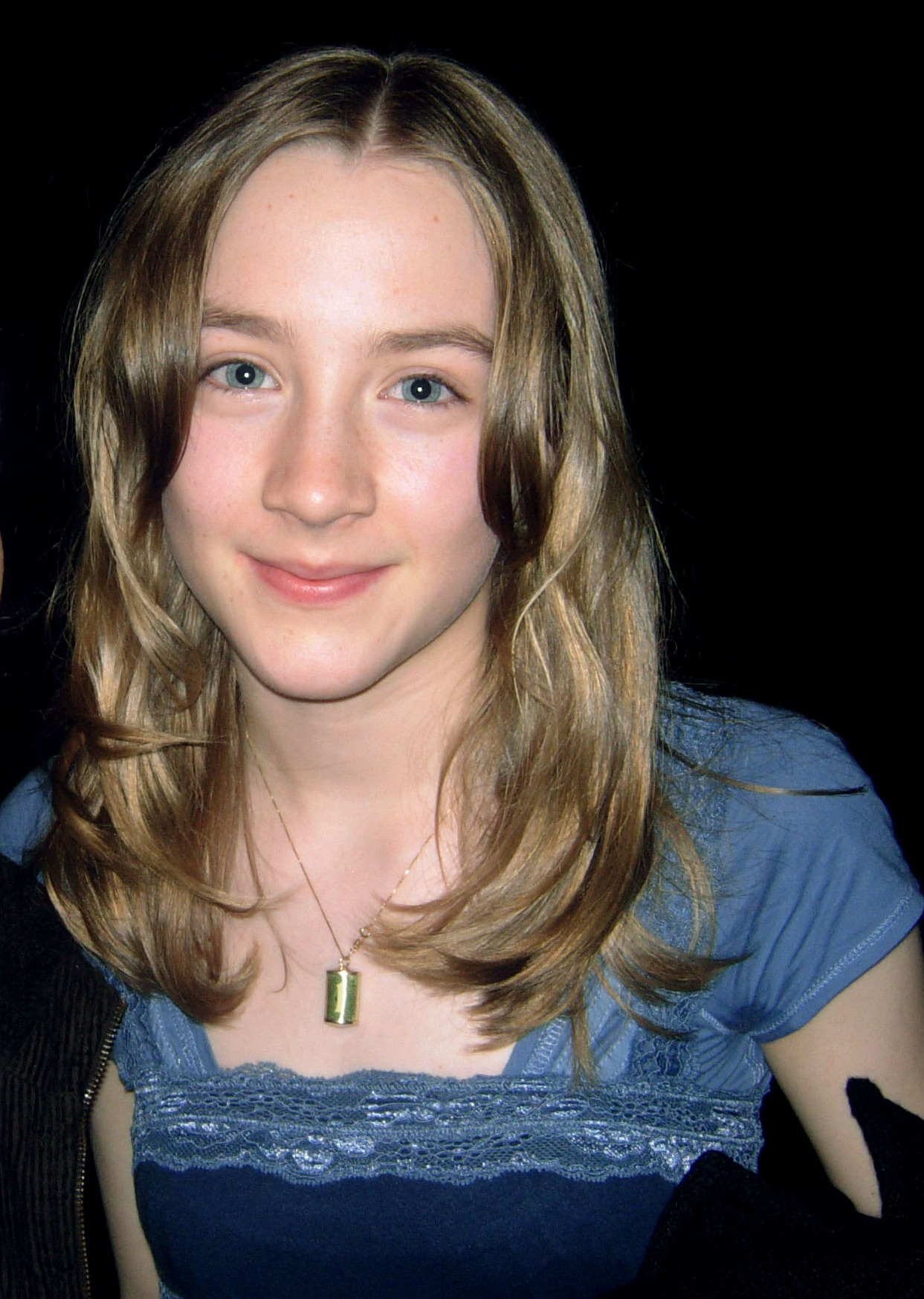
Saoirse Ronan, Best Actress winner

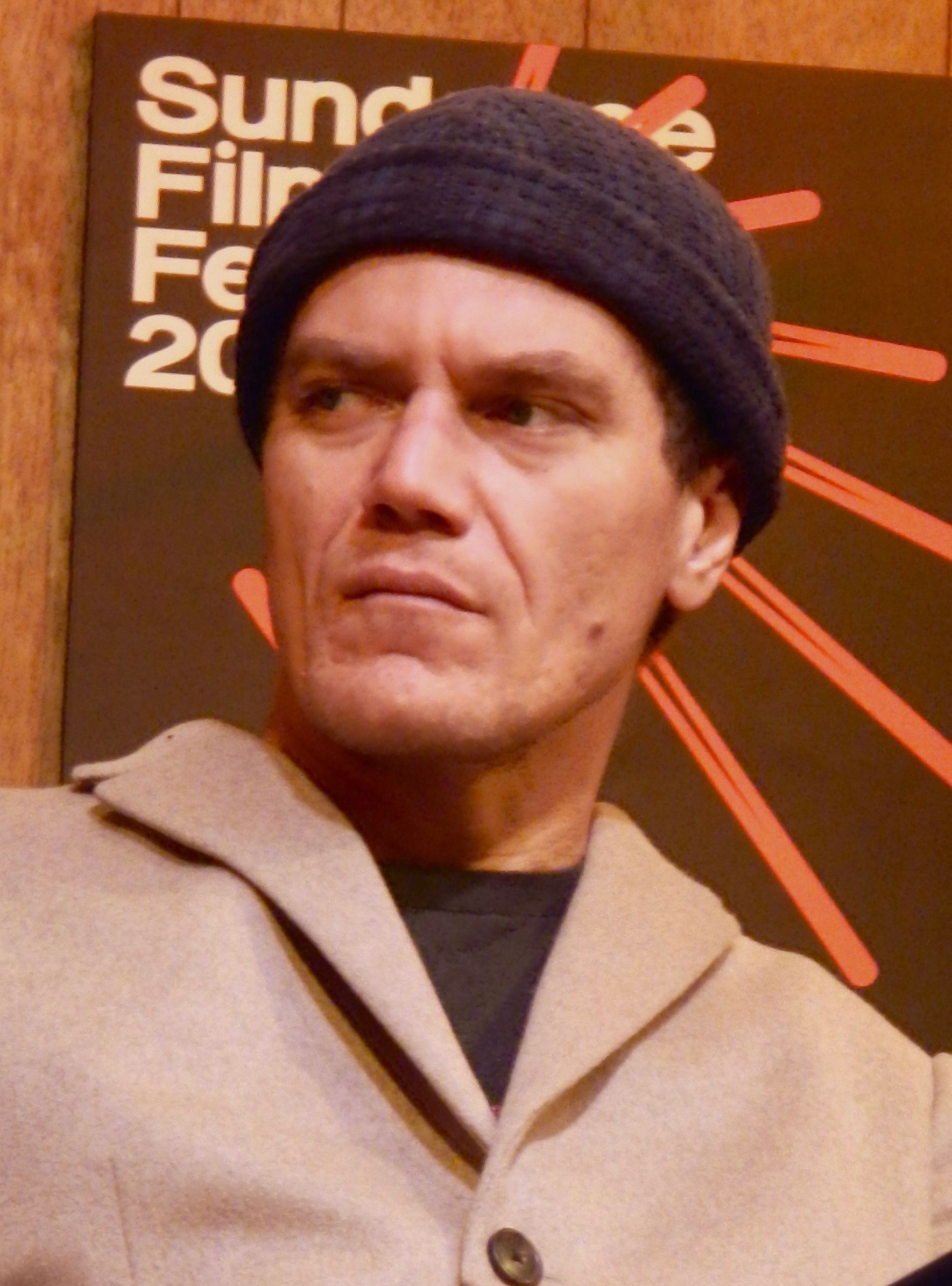
Michael Shannon, Best Supporting Actor winner

These are the nominees for the 14th SFFCC Awards. Winners are listed at the top of each list:

Best Film	Best Director
Spotlight; Brooklyn; Carol; Love & Mercy; Mad Max: Fury Road	George Miller – Mad Max: Fury Road; John Crowley – Brooklyn; Todd Haynes – Carol; Alejandro G. Iñárritu – The Revenant; Tom McCarthy – Spotlight
Best Actor	Best Actress
Paul Dano – Love & Mercy; Bryan Cranston – Trumbo; Leonardo DiCaprio – The Revenant; Michael Fassbender – Steve Jobs; Ian McKellen – Mr. Holmes	Saoirse Ronan – Brooklyn; Cate Blanchett – Carol; Brie Larson – Room; Rooney Mara – Carol; Charlotte Rampling – 45 Years
Best Supporting Actor	Best Supporting Actress
Michael Shannon – 99 Homes; Paul Dano – Love & Mercy; Benicio del Toro – Sicario; Mark Rylance – Bridge of Spies; Sylvester Stallone – Creed	Mya Taylor – Tangerine; Elizabeth Banks – Love & Mercy; Helen Mirren – Trumbo; Alicia Vikander – The Danish Girl; Alicia Vikander – Ex Machina
Best Screenplay – Adapted	Best Screenplay – Original
Nick Hornby – Brooklyn; Emma Donoghue – Room; Drew Goddard – The Martian; Andrew Haigh – 45 Years; Marielle Heller – The Diary of a Teenage Girl; Phyllis Nagy – Carol	Michael Alan Lerner and Oren Moverman – Love & Mercy; Sean Baker and Chris Bergoch – Tangerine; Alex Garland – Ex Machina; Tom McCarthy and Josh Singer – Spotlight; Taylor Sheridan – Sicario
Best Animated Feature	Best Documentary Film
Anomalisa; Boy and the World; Inside Out; The Peanuts Movie; Shaun the Sheep Movie	Listen to Me Marlon; Amy; Best of Enemies; The Look of Silence; Meru
Best Foreign Language Film	Best Cinematography
Son of Saul; The Assassin; Goodnight Mommy; A Pigeon Sat on a Branch Reflecting on Existence; Timbuktu	John Seale – Mad Max: Fury Road; Roger Deakins – Sicario; Edward Lachman – Carol; Emmanuel Lubezki – The Revenant; Mark Lee Ping-bing – The Assassin
Best Editing	Best Production Design
Margaret Sixel – Mad Max: Fury Road; Hank Corwin – The Big Short; Dino Jonsäter – Love & Mercy; Stephen Mirrione – The Revenant; Joe Walker – Sicario	Carol; Bridge of Spies; Brooklyn; Mad Max: Fury Road; The Revenant

== Special awards ==
=== Special Citation Award for under-appreciated independent cinema ===
- Guy Maddin – The Forbidden Room

=== Marlon Riggs Award for courage & vision in the Bay Area film community ===
- Lee Tung Foo (a.k.a. Frank Lee)
