= The Price of Salt =

Novel by Patricia Highsmith

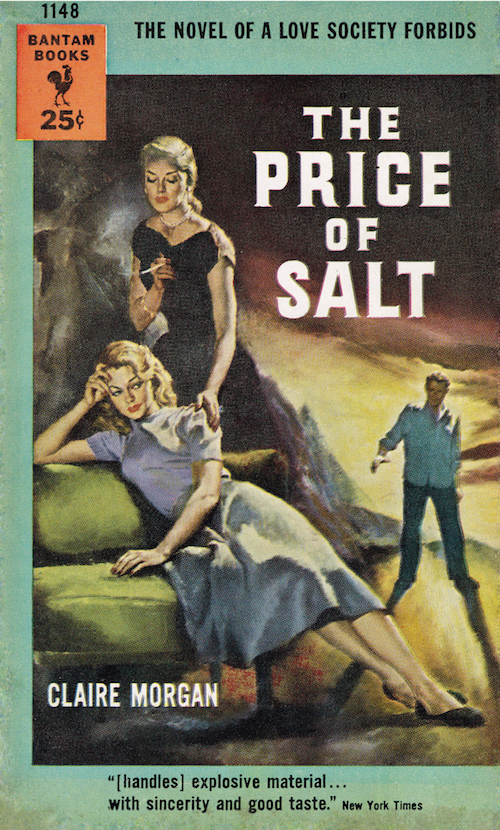
- 1953 Bantam Books edition
- Author: Patricia Highsmith; Claire Morgan (nom de plume)
- Language: English
- Genre: Novel
- Published: 1952
- Publisher: Coward-McCann, W. W. Norton & Company (2004)
- Publication place: United States
- Media type: Print (hardback & paperback)
- Pages: 276 pp (hardcover ed.); 292 pp (paperback ed., 2004)
- ISBN: 978-0-393-32599-7 (2004 ed.)
- OCLC: 1738553
- LC Class: PZ3.H53985 Pr (LCCN 52008026)

The Price of Salt (later republished under the title Carol) is a 1952 romance novel by Patricia Highsmith, first published under the pseudonym "Claire Morgan." Highsmith—known as a suspense writer based on her psychological thriller Strangers on a Train—used an alias as she did not want to be tagged as "a lesbian-book writer", (Note: Highsmith wrote in the Afterword for the novel's Bloomsbury 1990 republication as Carol: "If I were to write a novel about a lesbian relationship, would I then be labelled a lesbian-book writer? That was a possibility, even though I might never be inspired to write another such book in my life. So I decided to offer the book under another name.") and she also used her own life references for characters and occurrences in the story.

Although Highsmith wrote over 22 novels and numerous short stories and had many sexual and romantic relationships with women, The Price of Salt is her only novel about an unequivocal lesbian relationship, and its relatively happy ending was unprecedented in lesbian literature. It is also notable for being the only one of her novels with "a conventional 'happy ending'" and characters who had "more explicit sexual existences".

A British radio adaptation of the novel was broadcast in 2014. Carol, a film adaptation released in 2015, was nominated for six Academy Awards and nine British Academy Film Awards.

== Plot ==
Therese Belivet is a lonely young woman, just beginning her adult life in Manhattan and looking for a chance to launch her career as a theatre set designer. When she was a young girl, her widowed mother sent her to an Episcopal boarding school, leaving her with a sense of abandonment. Therese is dating Richard, a young man she does not love and does not enjoy having sex with. On a long and monotonous day at work in the toy section of a department store during the Christmas season, Therese becomes interested in a customer, an elegant and beautiful woman in her early thirties. The woman's name is Carol Aird, and she gives Therese her address so her purchases may be delivered. On an impulse, Therese sends her a Christmas card. Carol, who is going through a difficult separation and divorce and is herself quite lonely, unexpectedly responds. The two begin to spend time together. Therese develops a strong attachment to Carol. Richard accuses Therese of having a "schoolgirl crush," but Therese knows it is more than that: she is in love with Carol.

Carol's husband, Harge, is suspicious of Carol's relationship with Therese, whom he meets briefly when Therese stays over at Carol's house in New Jersey. Carol had previously admitted to Harge that she had a short-lived sexual relationship months earlier with her best friend, Abby. Harge takes his and Carol's daughter, Rindy, to live with him, limiting Carol's access to her as divorce proceedings continue. To escape from the tension in New York, Carol and Therese take a road trip west as far as Utah, over the course of which it becomes clear that the feelings they have for each other are romantic and sexual. They become physically as well as emotionally intimate and declare their love for each other.

The women become aware that a private investigator is following them, hired by Harge to gather evidence that could be used against Carol by incriminating her as homosexual in the upcoming custody hearings. They realize the investigator has already bugged the hotel room in which Carol and Therese first had sex. On a road in Nebraska, after the detective has followed them for miles and clearly intends to continue doing so, Carol confronts him and demands that he hand over any evidence against her. She pays him a high price for some tapes even though he warns her that he has already sent several tapes and other evidence to Harge in New York. Carol knows that she will lose custody of Rindy if she continues her relationship with Therese. She decides to return to New York to fight for her rights regarding her daughter and will return to Therese as soon as she can. Therese stays alone in the Midwest; eventually, Carol writes to tell her that she has agreed not to continue their relationship.

The evidence for Carol's homosexuality is so strong that she capitulates to Harge rather than having the details of her behavior aired in court. She submits to an agreement that gives him full custody of Rindy and leaves her with limited supervised visits.

Though heartbroken, Therese returns to New York to rebuild her life. Therese and Carol arrange to meet again. Therese, still hurt that Carol abandoned her in a hopeless attempt to maintain a relationship with Rindy, declines Carol's invitation to live with her. They part, each headed for a different evening engagement. Therese, after a brief flirtation with an English actress that leaves her ashamed, quickly reviews her relationships—"loneliness swept over her like a rushing wind"—and goes to find Carol, who greets her more eagerly than ever before.

== Major themes ==
=== Lesbian spaces ===
The heteronormative society illustrated in The Price of Salt forced Carol and Therese to seek refuge and freedom to express their sexuality. Susan Fraiman explains this as "shelter writing", which is the "safety, sanity and self-expression–survival in the most basic sense", which were not permitted to be expressed in the public sphere. As a result, the only constant safe lesbian space that Carol and Therese have is their home. Literary scholar Alice M. Kelly wrote that there are conversations about the spaces for homosexuals in the setting of 1950s New York. Kelly calls the private sphere a "homonormative tool" that shelters the "same-sex sexual practices within it to appease a mainstream society." Because they are surrounded by both people and societal norms that do not allow them to express their sexuality and relationship, their self-expression is limited to being concealed behind a heteronormative façade.

When Therese is first invited to Carol's home, she is in awe of her home as huge and clearly established, but Victoria Hesford explores how the setting is "an extension of the stultifying mechanisms of exchange and production that structure Frankenberg's", as her home fits into the perfect consumer's home. Everything and everyone have their place which all fit into this nuclear family and heteronormative society, so when Therese enters this home, she stands out and it reminds Carol that their relationship and her feelings cannot be truly hidden in her family home. Carol's family home is "a hollow monument to middle-class heteronormativity" and to escape it they both go on a liberating road trip, where the notion of the home as a "homonormative tool" from Kelly's work links, as both women conceal their relationship behind hotel room doors and in the later parts of the novel in their respected homes.

The Price of Salt not only explores lesbian spaces but also the sudden intervention of heteronormative society, represented through Harge hiring a detective to follow Carol and tape-record her most intimate moments with Therese as evidence to win sole custody of Rindy. This invasion of privacy ends Carol and Therese's retreat and breaks apart their relationship as Carol is forced to return into the heteronormative realm to win over her daughter, but it is too late, as they do not see her fit to be a mother due to her homosexuality.

=== Age differences ===
"I said I would stop seeing you. I wonder if you will understand, Therese, since you are so young and never even knew a mother who cared desperately for you."

The age difference between Therese and Carol is a characteristic of Highsmith's novel that many critics have sought to analyse, particularly under readings of mother-daughter relations. Carol is only around ten years Therese's senior, but she becomes aged in her characterisation within The Price of Salt. Jenny M. James argues in her article "Maternal Failures, Queer Futures: Reading The Price of Salt (1952) and Carol (2015) against Their Grain" that Carol becomes a maternal figure, involved in Therese's "queer, extended girlhood". There is a noticeable parental connection between the couple; Carol orders Therese around as if a child, Therese in turn sulks and experiences states of 'melancholy' when Carol disappoints her. Part way through the novel, Carol commands Therese to take a nap, and Therese complies, asking for a glass of warm milk, which Carol brings to her like a mother to child.

"What would you like, a drink?"
Therese knew she meant water. She knew from the tenderness and the concern in her voice, as if she were a child sick with fever. Then Therese said it: "I think I'd like some hot milk."
The corner of Carol's mouth lifted in a smile. "Some hot milk," she mocked. Then she left the room.

Carol's 'maternal' instincts appear throughout the novel, such as her teaching Therese how to drive, as well as constantly paying for Therese and offering cheques. There are numerous examples like this, where Carol maintains a position of authority over Therese, and Therese follows along like an obedient child. Furthermore, Carol directs Therese's behaviour within their public relationship to presumably avoid exposure. Therese's youthfulness can be linked to her "relatively naïve perception", which feeds into the very presentation of her sexuality: an often-outward display of affection that Carol reprimands. Lindsay Stephens pays attention to this governing of "closeting" in her article, particularly drawing upon the instance where Therese takes Carol's arm in a moment of fondness.

=== Motherhood ===
Jenny M. James makes a comparison between Rindy and Therese, as if they are competing for Carol's love. Carol seems to leave her motherhood behind to pursue a romantic relation with Therese. If we view the ending as a triumph on Therese's behalf, Rindy loses her mother in a sense, feeding into the idea that same-sex relationships and parenthood are mutually exclusive. It is equally important to recognise the restrictions of the law at the time, as "lesbian mothers...in this period lived under the threat of custody loss if their same-sex sexuality was discovered".

== Background ==
According to Highsmith, the novel was inspired by a blonde woman in a mink coat (Note: The woman in the fur coat was Kathleen Wiggins Senn (Mrs. E.R. Senn). Highsmith used her name in the first working title of the novel, "The Bloomingdale Story".) who ordered a doll from her while Highsmith was working as a temporary sales clerk in the toy section of Bloomingdale's in New York City during Christmas season of 1948: (Note: To help pay for twice-a-week psychoanalysis sessions to 'cure' her homosexuality, Highsmith took a sales job during Christmas rush season in Bloomingdale's department store. Ironically, this led to the creation of her novel in which two women meet in a department store and begin a passionate affair.)

Perhaps I noticed her because she was alone, or because a mink coat was a rarity, and because she was blondish and seemed to give off light. With the same thoughtful air, she purchased a doll, one of two or three I had shown her, and I wrote her name and address on the receipt, because the doll was to be delivered to an adjacent state. It was a routine transaction, the woman paid and departed. But I felt odd and swimmy in the head, near to fainting, yet at the same time uplifted, as if I had seen a vision. As usual, I went home after work to my apartment, where I lived alone. That evening I wrote out an idea, a plot, a story about the blondish and elegant woman in the fur coat. I wrote some eight pages in longhand in my then-current notebook or cahier.

Highsmith recalled completing the book's outline in two hours that night, likely under the influence of chickenpox which she discovered she had only the next day: "fever is stimulating to the imagination." She completed the novel by 1951. The semi-autobiographical story was mined from her own life references and desire for a lost love. Highsmith described the character of Therese as having come "from my own bones". Playwright Phyllis Nagy, who met Highsmith in 1987 and developed a friendship with her that lasted for the remainder of Highsmith's life, said that Therese was Highsmith's "alter ego" and "the voice of an author."

The character of Carol Aird and much of the plot of the novel was inspired by Highsmith's former lovers Kathryn Hamill Cohen and Philadelphia socialite Virginia Kent Catherwood, and her relationships with them. Virginia Catherwood lost custody of her daughter in divorce proceedings that involved tape-recorded lesbian trysts in hotel rooms. The story shared the same "sexual behavior" and "intense emotion" obsessions that Highsmith's writing became known for.

Highsmith placed Therese in the world of the New York theater with friends who are "vaguely bohemian, artists or would-be artists" and signaled their intellectual aspirations by noting they read James Joyce and Gertrude Stein, the latter unmistakably lesbian. All are struggling to find a place for themselves in the world.

The first working title of the novel (written in her "cahier" No. 18) was "The Bloomingdale Story". Other names Highsmith later considered were "The Argument of Tantalus", "Blasphemy of Laughter", and "Paths of Lightening" before finally naming it The Price of Salt. Highsmith said that she settled on the title from a thought about the price paid by Lot's wife when she looked back towards Sodom. It's more likely, however, that she was invoking a biblical reference from the Gospel text (Matthew 5:13) that André Gide included in his novel The Counterfeiters, a work about the transgressive love of adolescence that Highsmith once took to heart: "'If the salt have lost his flavor wherewith shall it be salted?'—that is the tragedy with which I am concerned." (Note: The phrase "the price of salt" does not appear in the text, but Highsmith used "salt" as a metaphor twice in Chapter 22. Separated from Carol, who has been forced to return home, Therese is reminded of their time together: "In the middle of the block, she opened the door of a coffee shop, but they were playing one of the songs she had heard with Carol everywhere, and she let the door close and walked on. The music lived, but the world was dead. And the song would die one day, she thought, but how would the world come back to life? How would its salt come back?" Shortly thereafter, when Dannie visits Therese on his way to California, she compares her sentiment toward him and Richard: "She felt shy with him, yet somehow close, a closeness charged with something she had never felt with Richard. Something suspenseful, that she enjoyed. A little salt, she thought.")

== Publication history ==
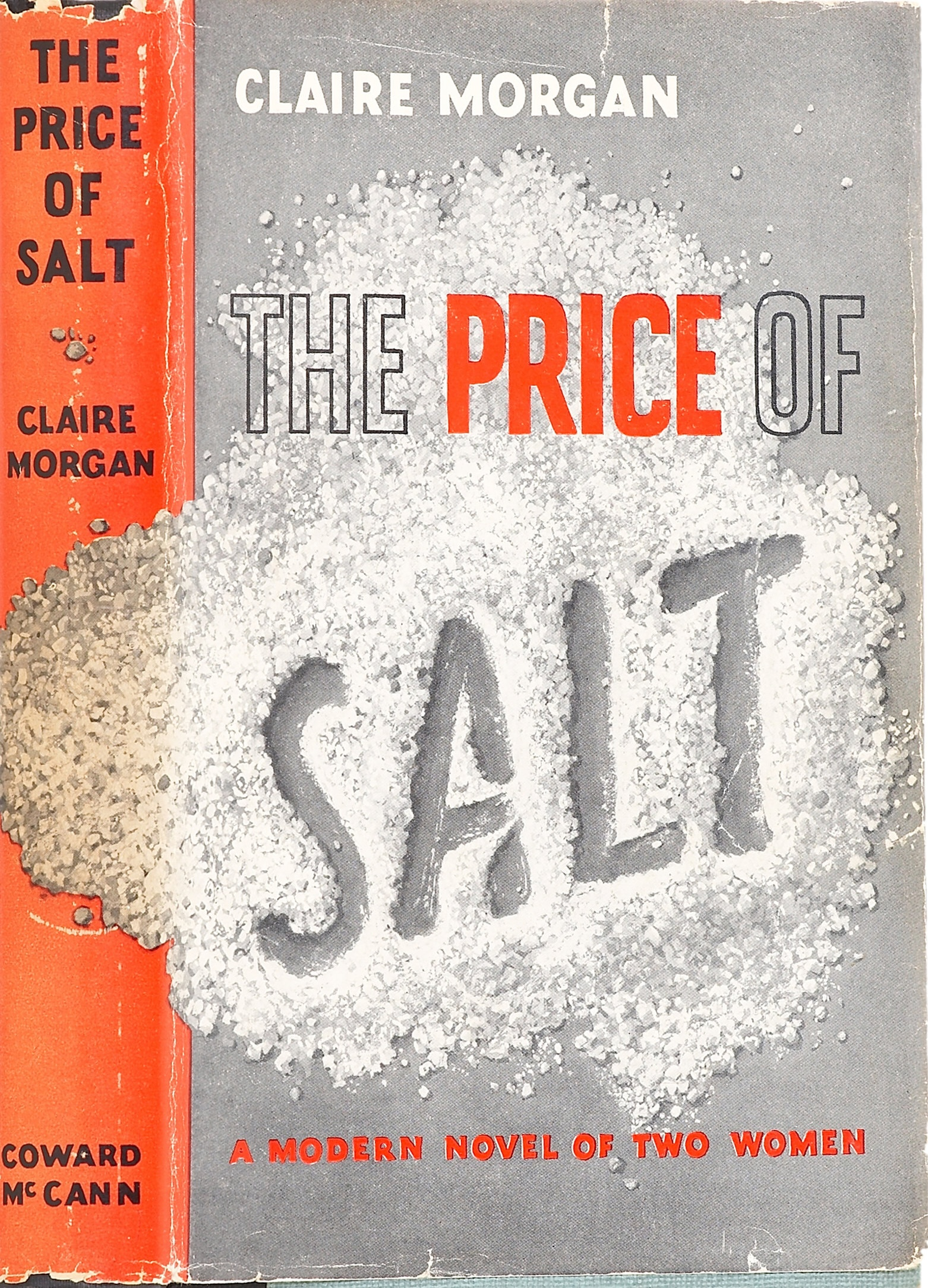
Original Coward-McCann cover

Highsmith's publisher, Harper & Bros, rejected the manuscript. Her agent warned her that she was committing career suicide by following Strangers on a Train with a blatantly lesbian novel. It was accepted by Coward-McCann and published in hardcover in 1952 with the "Claire Morgan" alias. She dedicated the book to "Edna, Jordy and Jeff"—three people whom Highsmith invented.

The 25-cent lesbian pulp edition by Bantam Books appeared in 1953, followed by a mass market edition in 1969 by Macfadden Books. The Price of Salt subsequently fell out of print.

In 1983, lesbian publishing house Naiad Press offered Highsmith $5,000 to reprint the novel under her own name, or $2,000 under the pseudonym. Highsmith accepted the latter and it was reissued in 1984. In 1990, the book was republished by Bloomsbury as Carol under Patricia Highsmith's name, with the addition of an afterword by her. Phyllis Nagy said Highsmith chose "Carol" because Highsmith, herself, "was Therese and the object of her desire wasn't herself...it was someone else." The novel was so personal to Highsmith that "it was difficult for her to take ownership of it as a writer for many years."

The marketing of the novel in successive editions reflected different strategies for making the story of a lesbian romance attractive or acceptable to the reading public. The Coward-McCann dust jacket called it "A Modern Novel of Two Women". The paperboard cover of the 1953 Bantam edition balanced the words "The Novel of a Love Society Forbids" with a reassuring quote from The New York Times that said the novel "[handles] explosive material ... with sincerity and good taste." (Note: The back-cover copy of the paperback stated: "Here is a novel, utterly sincere and honest, which deals with a subject until recently considered taboo. Now a young woman, Claire Morgan, comes along and writes of unsanctioned love from a completely new point of view. As the Louisville Times says: 'The Price of Salt' ... seems to mark a new departure in this type of fiction ... Claire Morgan is completely natural. She has a story to tell and she tells it with an almost conversational ease. Her people are neither degenerate monsters nor fragile victims of the social order. They must—and do—pay a price for thinking, feeling and loving 'differently;' but they are courageous and true to themselves throughout.") The 2004 reissue by Norton appealed to highbrow tastes with the tagline "The novel that inspired Nabokov's Lolita " on the cover—a claim that stemmed from a theory by Terry Castle published in a 2003 essay for The New Republic. (Note: Terry Castle wrote: "I have long had a theory that [Vladimir] Nabokov knew The Price of Salt and modeled the climactic cross-country car chase in Lolita on Therese and Carol's frenzied bid for freedom in the earlier novel.") (The tagline was not included in subsequent editions.)

As a movie tie-in with the release of the 2015 motion picture adaptation of the novel, Norton published a new paperback edition as Carol with the subtitle "Previously Titled The Price of Salt", and the cover featuring the image of the North American theatrical film poster. The cover of the Bloomsbury tie-in edition featured the title Carol superimposed on a scene from the film with images of Cate Blanchett and Rooney Mara from another scene, but did not include a reference to the original title.

== Reception ==
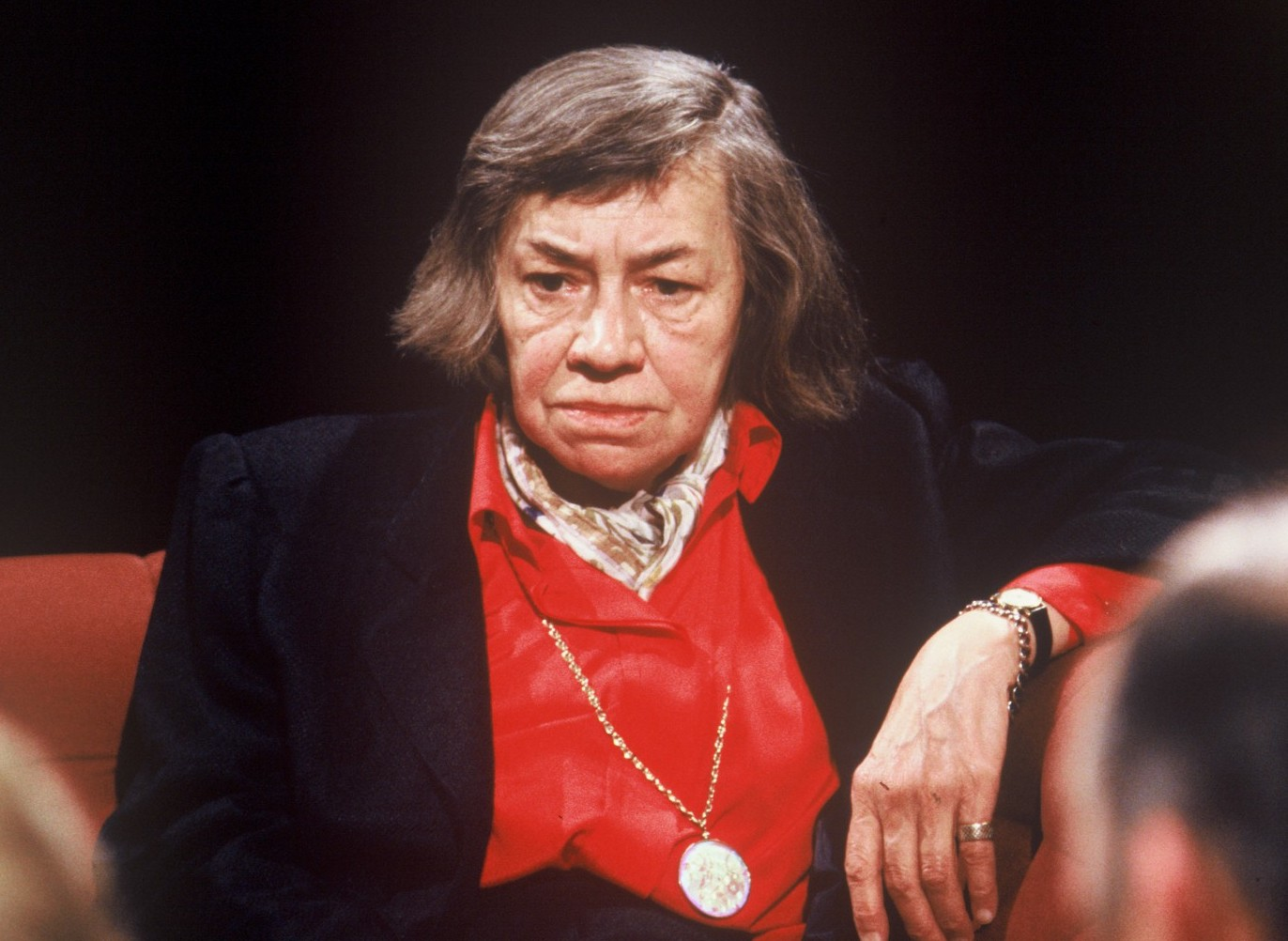
Patricia Highsmith on After Dark (June 1988)

The paperback version of The Price of Salt sold nearly one million copies before its new edition as Carol in 1990. The novel was received well, and Highsmith received letters addressed to "Claire Morgan" through her publisher thanking her for writing a story that lesbian women could identify with. (Note: Highsmith wrote in her Afterword dated May 24, 1989: "The Price of Salt had some serious and respectable reviews when it appeared in hardcover in 1952. But the real success came a year later with the paperback edition, which sold nearly a million copies and was certainly read by more. The fan letters came in addressed to Claire Morgan, care of the paperback house. I remember receiving envelopes of ten and fifteen letters a couple of times a week and for months on end." "Many of the letters that came to me carried such messages as "Yours is the first book like this with a happy ending! We don't all commit suicide and lots of us are doing fine." Others said, "Thank you for writing such a story. It is a little like my own story …" "The letters trickled in for years, and even now a letter comes once or twice a year from a reader.")

Because of the new title and her acknowledged authorship, the novel received another round of reviews, thoroughly favorable, 38 years after its initial publication. Highsmith submitted to publicity interviews as well, though she resented questions about her sexuality and personal relationships. When BBC 2's The Late Show presenter Sarah Dunant asked her in 1990 if Carol constituted a "literary coming out", she replied looking irked: "I'll pass that one to Mrs. Grundy", referencing the character who embodies conventional propriety.

== Adaptations ==
An unsuccessful attempt was made in the early 1950s to turn the novel into a movie. In the screen treatment the title was changed to Winter Journey and the character of "Carol" was changed to "Carl".

A radio adaptation titled Carol was broadcast by BBC Radio 4 in December 2014 with Miranda Richardson as Carol Aird and Andrea Deck as Therese Belivet. It comprised five segments of approximately 15 minutes.

A 2015 British-American film adaptation of the novel, Carol, was directed by Todd Haynes from a screenplay by Phyllis Nagy. The film stars Cate Blanchett as Carol and Rooney Mara as Therese. Carol was an Official Selection of the 2015 Cannes Film Festival and won the Queer Palm award. The film received six Academy Award nominations, and nine British Academy Film Award nominations.

== Social significance ==
It would be Carol, in a thousand cities, a thousand houses, in foreign lands where they would go together, in heaven and in hell...Carol saw her, seemed to stare at her incredulously a moment while Therese watched the slow smile growing, before her arm lifted suddenly, her hand waved a quick, eager greeting that Therese had never seen before. Therese walked toward her.

Because of the happy (or at least, non-tragic) ending which defied the lesbian pulp formula, and because of the unconventional characters who defied stereotypes about female homosexuals, (Note: As Erin Carlston observed in her essay, the novel: "Didn't condemn its lovers to suicide or send them back to their men," and "departed from ... the standard not only in the popular conception of lesbians, but in almost all lesbian fiction before it.") The Price of Salt was popular among lesbians in the 1950s and continued to be with later generations. It was regarded for many years as the only lesbian novel with a happy ending. (Note: Marijane Meaker, who wrote lesbian stories under the pseudonym "Ann Aldrich" for Gold Medal Books, stated: "[The Price of Salt ] was for many years the only lesbian novel, in either hard or soft cover, with a happy ending.")

Highsmith told author Marijane Meaker that she was surprised when the book was praised by lesbian readers because of how it ended. She was pleased that it had become popular for that reason and said, "I never thought about it when I wrote it. I just told the story." When Highsmith allowed her name to be attached to the 1990 republication by Bloomsbury, she wrote in the "Afterword" to the edition:

The appeal of The Price of Salt was that it had a happy ending for its two main characters, or at least they were going to try to have a future together. Prior to this book, homosexuals male and female in American novels had had to pay for their deviation by cutting their wrists, drowning themselves in a swimming pool, or by switching to heterosexuality (so it was stated), or by collapsing—alone and miserable and shunned—into a depression equal to hell.

The novel's representation of its lesbian characters also departed from the period's stereotypical depiction of lesbians—both in popular literature and by the medical/psychological field (where females who did not conform to their sexual gender role were considered "congenital inverts")—that expected one member of a lesbian couple would be "noticeably masculine in her affect, style, and behavior". Highsmith depicts Therese as puzzled when her experience does not match that "butch-femme paradigm":

She had heard about girls falling in love, and she knew what kind of people they were and what they looked like. Neither she nor Carol looked like that. Yet the way she felt about Carol passed all the tests for love and fitted all the descriptions.

== See also ==
- List of lesbian fiction
