= Heather Loeffler =

- Occupations: production designer and set decorator
- Years active: 2001-present

Heather Loeffler is a production designer and set decorator. Loeffler, along with production designer Judy Becker, is nominated for an Academy Award for Best Production Design for the 2013 film American Hustle.
