= Phyllis Nagy =

American screenwriter

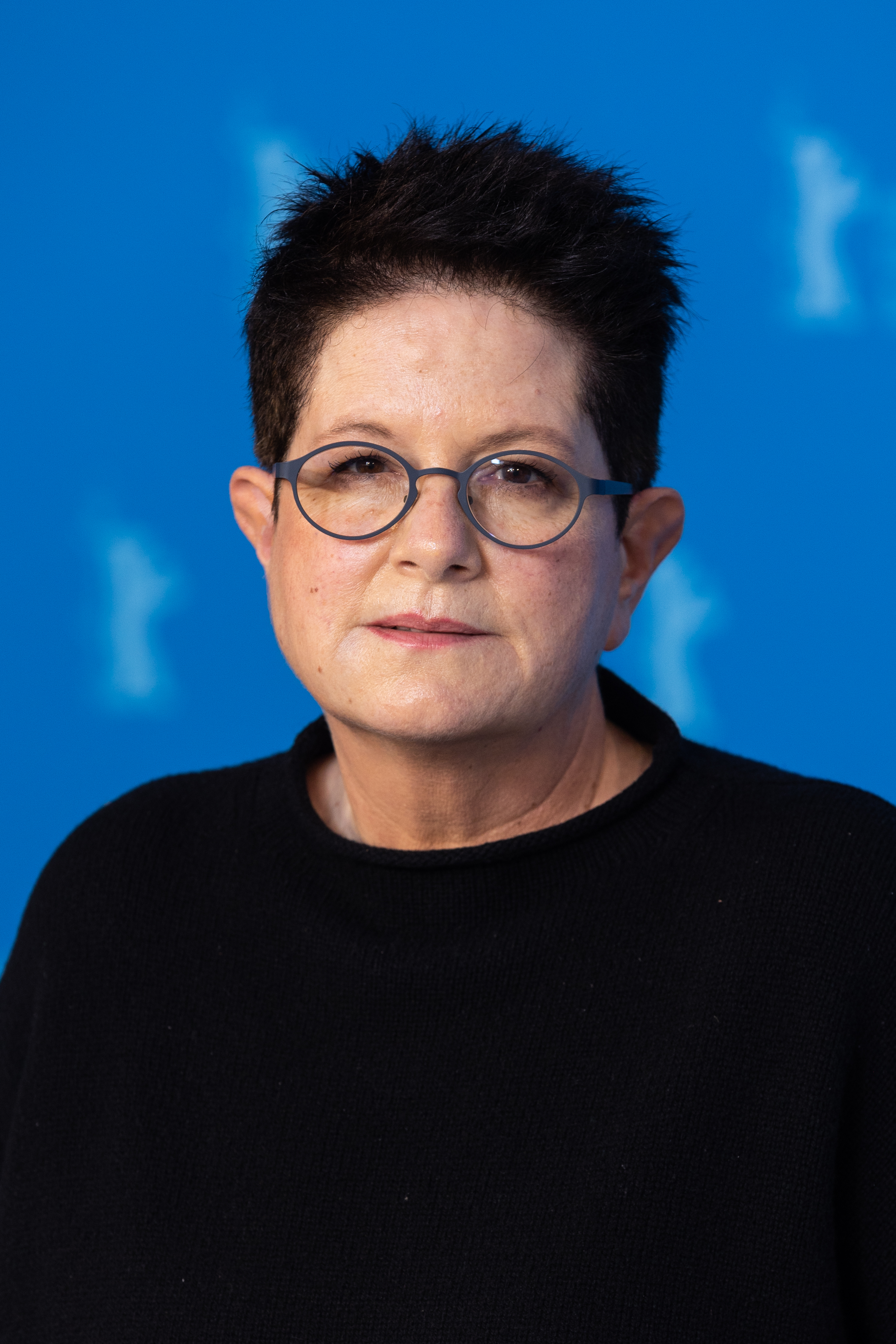
- At the 72nd Berlin International Film Festival, 2022
- Born: November 7, 1962 (age 64); New York City, U.S.
- Occupations: Film director, theater director, screenwriter, playwright
- Years active: 1992–present

Phyllis Nagy (/nɑːʒ/ NAHZH; born November 7, 1962) is an American theatre and film director, screenwriter and playwright. In 2006, Nagy was nominated for the Primetime Emmy Award for writing and directing Mrs. Harris (2005), her screen debut. In 2016, Nagy was nominated for an Academy Award for Best Adapted Screenplay, among numerous other accolades, for the 2015 film Carol.

== Life and career ==
Nagy was born in New York City and moved to London in 1992, where her playwriting career began in earnest at the Royal Court Theatre under the artistic direction of Stephen Daldry for whom she served as the Royal Court's writer-in-residence in the mid-1990s.

Nagy's plays have been performed in many countries. They include Weldon Rising, first produced by the Royal Court Theatre in association with the Liverpool Playhouse in 1992; Butterfly Kiss, first produced by the Almeida Theatre Company in 1994 (not to be confused with the Michael Winterbottom film of the same name Butterfly Kiss); The Scarlet Letter, an adaptation of Nathaniel Hawthorne's classic novel, commissioned and first produced by the Denver Centre Theatre in 1994; Trip's Cinch, commissioned and first produced by the Actors Theatre of Louisville in 1994 and received its UK premiere in 2002; The Strip, commissioned and first produced by the Royal Court Theatre in 1995; and Disappeared, a joint winner of both the 1992 Mobil International Playwriting Prize and the 1995 Susan Smith Blackburn Prize. Disappeared premiered at the Royal Court in 1995 in a production directed by the author which subsequently toured the UK before a London run at the Royal Court Theatre. The play went on to win the Writers' Guild of Great Britain Award for Best Regional Play and the Eileen Anderson/Central Television Award for Best Play. In February 1999, Disappeared was presented at the Steppenwolf Theatre Company, Chicago by RoadWorks Productions.

Nagy's most recent plays are Never Land, which premiered at the Royal Court Theatre in January 1998, in a co-production with The Foundry; and The Talented Mr. Ripley, adapted from the novel by Patricia Highsmith which premiered at the Watford Palace Theatre, in October 1998, and later produced by the Melbourne Theatre Company in February 1999. Her version of Anton Chekhov's The Seagull was produced at Chichester Festival Theatre in the summer of 2003. In 2005, Nagy directed a production of The Scarlet Letter at the same venue.

Nagy wrote the screenplay for Carol, an adaption of the 1952 Patricia Highsmith novel The Price of Salt. Nagy, who was a friend of Highsmith, wrote the first draft of the script in 1997. Nagy's second film as a director, Call Jane, debuted at 2022 Sundance Film Festival.

== Personal life ==
Nagy is lesbian. Speaking to HuffPost in 2015, she said: "I'm an out lesbian, I always have been and I think by leading my life openly as possible and trying to inspire other people to do that and help other people do that, I don't know if there could be a bigger commitment than that, to inspire people not to hide, let's say." Nagy has been critical about the film industry's portrayal of lesbians. In a Guardian interview, Nagy commented, "If we're talking specifically about gay women, about who they're allowed to be, who gets to make the movies, it's generally men."

== Accolades ==
Nagy was nominated for Primetime Emmy Awards for writing and directing Mrs. Harris (2006), her screen debut. The film starred Ben Kingsley and Annette Bening (both also Emmy-nominated), and garnered a total of 12 Primetime Emmy Award nominations, three Golden Globe Award nominations, and three Screen Actors Guild Award nominations. Nagy won a number of awards for her writing and directing of Mrs. Harris, including a PEN Center USA West Award for her teleplay and a Gracie Allen Award for Outstanding Director. In 2015, Nagy received many awards and nominations for her work on Carol, including a New York Film Critics Circle Award for Best Screenplay, and nominated for the Academy Award for Best Adapted Screenplay, Independent Spirit Award for Best Screenplay, and Writers Guild of America Award for Best Adapted Screenplay.

In 2016, the British Film Institute named Carol the best LGBT film of all time, as voted by over 100 film experts, including critics, filmmakers, curators, academics, and programmers, in a poll encompassing over 80 years of cinema.

== Filmography ==
Year	Title	Director	Writer	Notes
2005	Mrs. Harris	Yes	Yes	Television film
2015	Carol	No	Yes	
2022	Call Jane	Yes	No	
