= Carol (film) =

2015 film by Todd Haynes

- North American theatrical release poster
- Directed by: Todd Haynes
- Screenplay by: Phyllis Nagy
- Based on: The Price of Salt by Patricia Highsmith
- Produced by: Elizabeth Karlsen; Stephen Woolley; Christine Vachon
- Starring: Cate Blanchett; Rooney Mara; Sarah Paulson; Jake Lacy; Kyle Chandler
- Cinematography: Ed Lachman
- Edited by: Affonso Gonçalves
- Music by: Carter Burwell
- Production companies: Number 9 Films; Film4 Productions; Killer Films
- Distributed by: StudioCanal (United Kingdom); The Weinstein Company (United States)
- Release dates: May 17, 2015 (Cannes); November 20, 2015 (United States); November 27, 2015 (United Kingdom)
- Running time: 119 minutes
- Countries: United Kingdom; United States
- Language: English
- Budget: $11.8 million
- Box office: $42 million

Carol is a 2015 romantic drama film directed by Todd Haynes. The screenplay by Phyllis Nagy is based on the 1952 romance novel The Price of Salt by Patricia Highsmith (republished as Carol in 1990). The historical film stars Cate Blanchett, Rooney Mara, Sarah Paulson, Jake Lacy, and Kyle Chandler. Set in 1950s New York City, the story is about a forbidden affair between an aspiring female photographer and an older woman going through a difficult divorce.

Carol was in development since 1997, when Nagy wrote the first draft of the screenplay. British company Film4 Productions and its then-chief executive Tessa Ross financed development. The film was in development hell, facing problems with financing, rights, scheduling conflicts, and accessibility. Number 9 Films came on board as a producer in 2011, when Elizabeth Karlsen secured the rights to the novel. The film is co-produced by New York–based Killer Films, which joined the project in 2013 after Haynes's collaborator Christine Vachon approached him to direct. Principal photography on the British-American production began in March 2014, in Cincinnati, Ohio, and lasted 34 days. Cinematographer Edward Lachman shot Carol on Super 16 mm film.

Carol premiered at the Cannes Film Festival on May 17, 2015, and was released in the United States on November 20 and in the United Kingdom on November 27. Grossing over $42 million on an $11 million budget, the film received widespread acclaim for Haynes's direction and the performances of Blanchett and Mara, and was the best-reviewed film of 2015. It competed for the Palme d'Or at Cannes, where Mara tied with Emmanuelle Bercot for the Best Actress award. The film received many accolades, including nominations for six Academy Awards, nine BAFTA Awards, and five Golden Globe Awards. It also won five Dorian Awards and awards from the New York Film Critics Circle, Los Angeles Film Critics Association, and National Society of Film Critics. Carol was ranked by the British Film Institute as the best LGBTQ film of all time, and named one of the greatest films of the 21st Century by the BBC.

== Plot ==
During the Christmas season of 1952, aspiring photographer Therese Belivet is working in Frankenberg's department store in Manhattan. She meets a glamorous woman, Carol Aird, who is searching for a doll for her daughter, Rindy. At Therese's recommendation, Carol purchases a model train set instead. When Carol departs, she leaves her gloves on the counter. Therese mails them to her using Frankenberg's sales slip with Carol's name and address.

Therese's boyfriend, Richard, wants her to go to France with him, hoping they will marry, but she is ambivalent about their relationship. A mutual friend, Dannie, invites Therese to his workplace, The New York Times, and offers to introduce her to a photo editor friend. Meanwhile, Carol is going through a difficult divorce from her husband, Harge. Carol calls Frankenberg's to thank the clerk who returned the gloves and invites Therese to lunch. Therese visits Dannie and he kisses her, but she becomes uncomfortable and leaves.

Carol invites Therese to her home in New Jersey. She stops to purchase a Christmas tree, and Therese takes candid photographs of her. Harge arrives unexpectedly to take Rindy to Florida for Christmas; he becomes suspicious of Therese, as Carol had an affair years before with her friend Abby. Therese witnesses their argument. After Rindy leaves, a distressed Carol takes Therese to the train station so she can return home.

Carol calls to apologize to Therese and they meet at her apartment, where Carol surprises her with a suitcase containing a gift of a Canon camera and film. Carol has learned that Harge is petitioning the judge to consider a "morality clause" against her, threatening to expose her homosexuality and give him full custody of Rindy. She decides to take a road trip to escape the stress of the divorce proceedings and invites Therese to join her. Richard accuses Therese of being infatuated with Carol and predicts Carol will soon tire of her. The two argue and their relationship comes to an end. On the second night of the trip, Therese meets a traveling salesman, Tommy Tucker.

On New Year's Eve, Carol and Therese kiss for the first time and have sex. The next morning, they discover that Tucker is actually a private investigator Harge hired to obtain evidence against Carol. Carol confronts Tucker, threatening him at gunpoint, but he claims to have already sent tape recordings to Harge. Carol and Therese turn back. The next day, in Chicago, Therese learns that Carol has flown home to fight for custody of her daughter, having asked Abby to drive Therese home. Abby gives her a letter from Carol. Back at home, Therese telephones Carol, but knowing that she risks losing custody of Rindy if she continues her relationship with Therese, Carol hangs up.

Therese creates a portfolio of her photographs and gets a job at The New York Times. In the meantime, Carol has been seeing a psychotherapist as a condition of the divorce settlement. During a confrontational meeting in mid-April with divorce lawyers, Carol suddenly admits to the truth of what the tapes contain and refuses to deny her sexuality. To avoid going to court and the likelihood of a public scandal, she tells Harge that he can have custody of Rindy if he allows her regular visits.

Carol writes to Therese, and they meet in the lounge of the Ritz Tower Hotel. Carol reveals she is going to work for a furniture house and has taken an apartment on Madison Avenue. Therese declines Carol's invitation to live with her. Carol tells Therese that she is meeting associates in the Oak Room, and that if she changes her mind, they can have dinner. Therese remains still and Carol says, "I love you." They are interrupted by Jack, a colleague who has not seen Therese in months, and Carol departs.

Therese accepts Jack's ride to a party, but finds she cannot connect with anyone. She leaves for the Oak Room. She scans the diners and sees Carol at a table. Therese hesitates, then walks toward Carol. Their eyes meet. Carol gazes at Therese with a smile that slowly grows.

== Cast ==
- Cate Blanchett as Carol Aird
- Rooney Mara as Therese Belivet
- Sarah Paulson as Abby Gerhard
- Jake Lacy as Richard Semco
- John Magaro as Dannie McElroy
- Cory Michael Smith as Tommy Tucker
- Carrie Brownstein as Genevieve Cantrell
- Kevin Crowley as Fred Haymes
- Nik Pajic as Phil McElroy
- Kyle Chandler as Harge Aird

== Production ==
=== Development ===
Carol is based on Patricia Highsmith's 1952 semi-autobiographical romantic novel The Price of Salt. The book was originally published under the pseudonym "Claire Morgan" by Coward-McCann after Highsmith's publisher Harper & Brothers rejected it. In 1990, Highsmith agreed to republish with Bloomsbury Publishing under her own name, and retitled it Carol. It had been inspired by an encounter in 1948 between Highsmith and a blonde woman wearing a mink coat, Kathleen Wiggins Senn, while she was working as a Christmas season salesgirl at the toy department of Bloomingdale's in New York. That evening she wrote an eight-page outline, which she developed some weeks later and had completed by 1951. The character of Therese Belivet was based on Highsmith herself. (Note: Highsmith described the character of Therese as having come "from my own bones".) Senn inspired the character of Carol Aird, but its template was inspired by Highsmith's relationships with two former lovers, Philadelphia socialite Virginia Kent Catherwood and psychoanalyst Kathryn Hamill Cohen. Catherwood lost custody of her daughter in a high-profile divorce that involved secret tape recordings of her and her female lover.

London-born, New York–based producer Dorothy Berwin was initially attached to the project in 1996, owning the rights to the novel. She enlisted then-playwright Phyllis Nagy to write the screenplay on the recommendation of her London agent. Nagy, who was a friend of Highsmith, wrote the first draft of the script in 1997. Highsmith had suggested to Nagy that she adapt one of her novels. According to Nagy, Highsmith was not confident that the novel could be made into a "satisfying" film because of its "intense, subjective point of view". Nagy decided to adapt the script to ensure its fidelity to the source material, remarking, "I felt a strange responsibility to take it, and to make sure that it wasn't screwed up in some fundamental way, because she so disliked many of the screen adaptations of her work."

What still strikes me now [about the novel], is how radical it was in terms of its overall conception—two central figures not giving a rat's ass about sexual identity. No one frets about being gay; others fret on their behalf...I also found Highsmith's notions of what makes a good mother to be quite radical—the choices that people have to make in order to make the lives of their children better seemed really fresh, and radical. And still do, to this day, actually.

— −Phyllis Nagy

While searching for investors, Nagy and Berwin learned that the characters' homosexuality was not as much of an obstacle as that they were women. "Having two women leads was the issue", Nagy noted. In 2015, Berwin said that, in those days, it was a risky idea to play the role of Carol. "As a project it came together with Cate Blanchett. You needed to always start with her role". Film4 Productions and Tessa Ross financed the development of the film and kept it alive through the years, as it "underwent a decade-plus of revision under various directors and investors"—including Hettie MacDonald, Kenneth Branagh, Kimberly Peirce, John Maybury, and Stephen Frears—until the project completely stalled. The long delay was a result of struggles with funding, rights, and trepidations about a film with a gay theme and two female leads. "During its development, there was a very different kind of lesbian or gay movie that got financed", Nagy said. "They were very agenda or issue driven, and this was not. In fact it insists on not being that in order to make the point. I would talk about that with financiers, and I could see them glaze over."

Nagy said it was important that the screenplay be authentic to the early 1950s. "There was a different protocol then, a different etiquette, a different way people related to each other physically", she said. "It does you no service to spoonfeed a contemporary audience their own emotional codes and value systems." While various directors and investors had input to the script during its long gestation period, Nagy rejected suggestions that Carol or Therese "should feel guilty about being gay and suffer some kind of breakdown scene about it." "What I knew going in to the adaptation", Nagy said, "was that Pat's lack of psychologizing about Carol and Therese's sexual attraction, and ultimately their love, had to be maintained. It could not be corrupted by an impulse to indulge in any number of dramatic narrative clichés about guilt concerning one's sexuality or the like."

Nagy set the adaptation several years later than the novel is set, so that "the dawn of the Eisenhower administration and the rise of HUAC could be front and center". One of the challenges was translating the subjective and limited third-person viewpoint, where the narrator "sits on the shoulder of Therese and makes regular advances into (and retreats from) her head"; Carol is thus largely seen through Therese's fanatical prism. Nagy was initially apprehensive about the narrative structure, considering "there's no character of Carol. She's a ghost appropriately, as she should be, in the novel", adding that she was "overwhelmed by the task of trying to come up with the visual equivalent for it structurally." She decided to split the point of view and shift perspectives from Therese to Carol, as "the point of view is always with the more vulnerable party". She made Therese a photographer instead of a set designer, allowing her "to be seen moving from objects to people", which she likened to Highsmith as Therese is a "clear stand-in" for the author. Nagy drew from her personal knowledge of Highsmith for Therese, describing one of Therese's lines, "I started taking pictures of people because my friend says I have to be more interested in humans", as the epitome of Highsmith: "that ability to step outside of life and comment on it before participating in it". For Carol, she took inspiration from Grace Kelly's character in Rear Window (1954). Nagy had freedom in "inventing a life for [Carol], for whom, basically, we knew the outline of what was going on." Once she was able to understand the inner life of Carol, and her motivations, the character became easy to write. Nagy aimed to "focus on the nature of what it's like to fall in love from two points of view", and show the characters "just behaving ... not inhabiting positions."

[Haynes and I] are of a similar mind, of similar influences ... he understood exactly that we were going for something almost entirely subtextual, and that it required bravery and a resistance to over-explication."

— −Phyllis Nagy

Nagy realized she would "pass time in a different way" than the novel, eliminating unnecessary elements. She had "great freedom" developing the screenplay in England, while no studio or director was attached. Over the years, five "proper" drafts materialized. Nagy said that after all the previous collaborations, "working for Todd was easy and quick. We both have an interest in restraint." Haynes and Nagy collaborated on honing the screenplay. When Haynes came on board they had discussions about "what became the framing device"; the story reminded Haynes of the 1945 classic film Brief Encounter, (Note: Haynes said: "The first film that I thought of when I read [the script] was Brief Encounter. And it made a real direct impact on some changes in the structure of the story. So we repeat that same structure in Brief Encounter that begins and ends with the same scene. The difference is that in Brief Encounter you realize that this is Celia Johnson's story. She goes home and begins to recount this experience to her husband. And you come full circle and then you realize what that conversation that was interrupted in the beginning of the film meant. And in this case we do the same thing, but you also shift point of views by the end of Carol, so by the time we come back, it's no longer Therese that's in the vulnerable position, but Carol.") and he proposed using a similar technique, which Nagy "then ran with in a certain way". "He was interested in the same things, tonally, that the script was interested in", she noted. "We were able to keep that restraint going". Nagy made the story more enigmatic, pruning some of the backstory in light of a significant early line that Carol says to Therese: "What a strange girl you are, flung out of space." Nagy and Haynes were determined not to make "an agenda film" or a "look how far we've come" film.

At the London Film Festival, Nagy said she had titled the film Carol and not The Price of Salt because Highsmith herself had changed the title to Carol when the novel was republished, and also because she "liked the sort of strange, obsessive nature of calling it by someone's name." Haynes said the film is called Carol because the novel "is locked into the subjectivity of the younger woman" and Carol is "really the object of desire in the story." "There's an element of, something aloof ... something unsettled about [her], that puts Therese and these new feelings ... on edge throughout much of the film". Of the story's universal theme, Haynes said, "the real determining question is not whether society will accept [Therese's] feelings or not; it's, will this person return her love or not? ... That is what transcends the class of love, or the period in which it's occurring, and makes it something that just humbles us all and levels us all."

=== Pre-production ===
British producer Elizabeth Karlsen of Number 9 Films came across Nagy's script around 2004, when she was co-producing Mrs. Harris with Christine Vachon of New York–based Killer Films. (Note: Karlsen said that she had wanted to do the film, "but the rights were held up with another producer [Dorothy Berwin]. It wasn't possible. So I just waited and waited. It took a good 10 years before the rights were free.") Berwin's rights to The Price of Salt expired in 2010, and Karlsen thereafter acquired the script. Berwin remained an executive producer on the film. Karlsen managed to convince Highsmith's estate to sign over the rights, closing the deal with Tessa Ross in late 2011. She then persuaded a disillusioned and reluctant Nagy to come back on board. The producers hired a UK director, who then dropped out because of scheduling conflicts. They later recruited Irish director John Crowley, who was announced in May 2012 along with the lead cast, Cate Blanchett and Mia Wasikowska, and the involved producers, Karlsen and Stephen Woolley of Number 9 Films and Tessa Ross of Film4, who received executive producer credit. Carol was scheduled to commence filming in early 2013, until Crowley withdrew due to a scheduling conflict. (Note: Karlsen said that after Crowley's departure, Blanchett's involvement as an actress would depend on the director. "In a weird way what we had was a script, no director, the possibility of Cate and also a fair number of pre-sales that HanWay had made.") Karlsen called Vachon to discuss losing another director, and Vachon told her that Haynes's new film was not going to happen because its star had also backed out. They then decided to approach Haynes. Vachon, Haynes's frequent collaborator, asked if he would be interested, and he received a copy of the screenplay. Two days later he committed to direct, and Vachon joined as a producer. Haynes was announced as director on May 22, 2013. Three days later, The Weinstein Company acquired U.S. distribution rights at the Cannes Film Festival from HanWay Films. (Note: In a 2018 interview with Cate Blanchett in which she was asked about her experience with Harvey Weinstein and described him as an "unwanted producer", Elizabeth Karlsen explained (in the comments section) his producer credit on the film: "The Weinstein Company were the US distributors of CAROL. The film was pre-sold to them at Cannes five years ago, nearly two years before we finally went into production. One of the non negotiable terms of the distribution agreement, which was a standard term for TWC and Miramax distribution agreements, was an Executive Producer credit for Harvey Weinstein. Indeed, EP credits for financiers, sales agents and distributors in key territories is industry standard. He was NOT a producer on the film. Neither he nor TWC were involved in the development of the film nor had any script, editorial, casting or other type of creative involvement in the film whatsoever. They acted solely as distributors. Had we had an offer equal to or greater than the TWC offer for US distribution rights we would have taken it, but we didn't. This is a frequent and frustrating misrepresentation of Harvey Weinstein and his role—he was a distributor, who stole the producing credit (as well as the financial rewards) from the actual producers who sourced, developed, filmed and fully created the work as we did with CAROL. He simply released and distributed it into cinemas. At one time he headed a great distribution company. As we found out on CAROL that time had passed.")

Haynes had first heard about the film in 2012 from costume designer Sandy Powell, who informed him that Blanchett was attached and Karlsen was producing. Blanchett, who served as an executive producer through her company Dirty Films, had been involved with the project for "a long time". Haynes learned that they were looking for a director when Vachon approached him in 2013. He regarded the story, its historical and social context, and collaborating again with Blanchett, as motivations to get involved. "What was so interesting to me when I first read this script", he said, "is how it basically links that hothouse mentality of the desiring subject ... to that of the criminal subject, in that both are these over-productive minds that are conjuring narratives constantly ... this crazy state of this furtive hyperactivity in the mind." Haynes collaborated with Blanchett on a dramaturgical level.

Another complication emerged when Wasikowska had to drop out because of a scheduling conflict. Haynes then approached Rooney Mara, who had been offered the role of Therese after completing the 2011 film The Girl With the Dragon Tattoo. She said that although she loved the script and wanted to work with Blanchett, she turned it down because she was exhausted and unconfident. By the time Haynes came on board she was "in a much different head space" and signing on was then "a no-brainer". In August 2013, it was reported that Mara had replaced Wasikowska. Sarah Paulson was cast as Abby and Kyle Chandler as Harge in January 2014. The next month, Cory Michael Smith was cast as Tommy and Jake Lacy as Richard. In April 2014, John Magaro was cast as Dannie. Carrie Brownstein then joined the cast as Genevieve Cantrell. Carter Burwell was hired to compose the music, and Edward Lachman, who had previously collaborated with Haynes, served as director of photography.

In rehearsal, Haynes, Blanchett and Mara realized that certain lines should be cut, which Haynes deemed the "stylistic practice that we all took throughout the creative departments. I feel there was an understanding with them that words and dialogue were never carrying the weight of the story." Costume designer Sandy Powell said of working with Haynes, "Todd is super visual, super prepared and he provides his own visuals at the beginning of the film. He starts with a look book of images that he's compiled over the months and months. He's almost OCD about it. In a good way." The film's look was influenced by the postwar color photography of Ruth Orkin, Esther Bubley, Helen Levitt, and Vivian Maier, as well as the abstract photography of Saul Leiter. Haynes used their work as a visual reference for depicting a "dirty and sagging" New York.

In preparing for filming, the producers found that the cost of production in the New York City area would be prohibitive, and it was also going to be difficult to find locations there that resembled the early 1950s. Part of the financing plan hinged upon a co-production deal with Canada, with filming taking place in Montreal, but Haynes joining the production led to a rethink. Karlsen recalled making a film 27 years earlier in Cincinnati, Ohio, that was set in 1950s New York. After researching the city, she found that it had not changed much in decades, with Ohio also having one of the best film tax incentives in the U.S. The city of Cincinnati was very accommodating to the production, which employed many locals as crew.

=== Filming ===
The production offices in Cincinnati opened in early January 2014, with filming expected between mid-March and May. In February 2014, the Greater Cincinnati & Northern Kentucky Film Commission released the solicitation from producers for extras and vintage vehicles. Principal photography began on March 12, 2014, at Eden Park in Cincinnati. Various locations around Cincinnati were used during production, including Downtown Cincinnati, Hyde Park, Over-the-Rhine, Wyoming, Cheviot, and Hamilton, as well as Alexandria, Kentucky. Except for the Waterloo motel room, which was a private set built for the love scene, locations were used for interior and exterior settings. The second floor of a now-defunct department store served as the setting for the toy department of the fictional Frankenberg's. Filming was completed after 34 days on May 2, 2014. Lachman shot Carol on Super 16 mm film using 35 mm format lenses.

=== Post-production ===
Post-production in New York took seven months to complete. Haynes was involved in the editing process alongside editor Affonso Gonçalves. Visual effects (VFX) were used to remove modern components from backgrounds, with six "key shots" needing extensive VFX. Moving shots were particularly complicated when they were filtered through windows, rain, dust, and other elements, said Haynes, and the CGI details "had to fit exactly into the vernacular itself, with the grain element and level of distress." The digital intermediate process was used to achieve a "very specific, slightly spoiled palette". Haynes spent five and a half weeks making detailed notes on Gonçalves's assembly edit, and produced his director's cut within four weeks. The producers gave notes on the director's cut and held some test screenings with friends and acquaintances. They decided to show the cut to Harvey Weinstein, who was impressed and endorsed it.

Haynes confirmed the completion of deliverables on December 15, 2014. Brownstein said the first cut was extensive and most of her scenes were left out. In November 2015, Paulson said that a key scene between Abby and Therese, and some conversation in a scene with Carol, had been cut. In January 2016, Mara said that an intimate scene between Therese and Richard had also been deleted. Gonçalves said that the initial cut was two and a half hours, and the final cut ended at 118 minutes. Haynes explained in an October 2015 interview: "We cut a lot of scenes; it was too long, and they were all well-performed and nicely shot—we never, in my opinion, cut things because they were poorly executed. It was just a paring-down process, which all movies do."

== Themes ==
=== Motherhood ===
Motherhood is an important theme in the film. Carol struggles to maintain both her romantic relationship with Therese and her love for her daughter Rindy. Because of her sexual orientation, Carol's relationship with Therese puts her role as a mother in jeopardy because society views her as unfit to be a mother. During her custody battle, her homosexuality is used against her and her "punishment for having engaged in sexual relationships with women is that she will only see her child for 'a few weeks of the year'". She is thus forced to make the decision of being herself or being a mother. Cate Blanchett explained that this is "a choice based on her own survival". She also points out that Carol's challenge is not about seeking sympathy but rather about survival and living authentically.

The theme of motherhood shows how non-heterosexual mothers are often ignored or undervalued. Academic scholar Jenny M. James affirms that "the novel's fantasy of lesbian romance relies on Carol's loss of maternal custody and the subsequent erasure of her experience as a queer mother". To live true to herself, Carol must give up her daughter, showing the tough challenges of being a homosexual mother. The film challenges traditional ideas of motherhood by showing that Carol must make hard choices. Carol's love for both Rindy and Therese can't exist together in her world, highlighting the social challenges faced by lesbian mothers.

=== Lesbian identity ===
The theme of lesbian identity is also important. It is shown in the relationship between Carol and Therese in a time when homosexual relationships were not accepted by society. Set in the 1950s, the film portrays the struggles homosexual women faced during an era when homosexuality was strongly condemned. Carol and Therese's love challenges the conventional as they deal with a social order that disapproves of their relationship.

An important aspect to note in Carol is that its portrayal of lesbians is not "the stereotypical butch lesbians or the sexy lesbians or...the background character”. Carol shows a genuine connection between two women without male interference, which is not common in film.

Prohibition and secrecy is emphasized. The relationship between Carol and Therese is hidden, thus creating tension. "Carol and Therese's relationship looks repressed," which illustrates what was socially acceptable during that time. Therese is even taught by Carol to keep their love a secret from others, illustrating the necessity for lesbian individuals to engage in "closeted public behaviours" to survive in a homophobic society.

Another factor of lesbian identity in the film is the idea of escape. Carol and Therese go on a road trip to find freedom from the oppressive rules of New Jersey and New York. However, they don't get the relief they hoped for. "The wide-open spaces of the West offer liberation from subjugation, while at the same time these spaces result in hypervisibility and, ironically, alternate iterations of the closet". Even though they try to escape, the detective following them throughout their journey reminds them that they are still being watched.

The film also looks at how homosexual women were treated as criminals during that time. The Price of Salt, the novel that serves as the basis for the screenplay, was written at a time when lesbian relationships were viewed as illegal. Carol addresses love in this way, as well as the consequences of being homosexual in the 1950s.

== Release ==
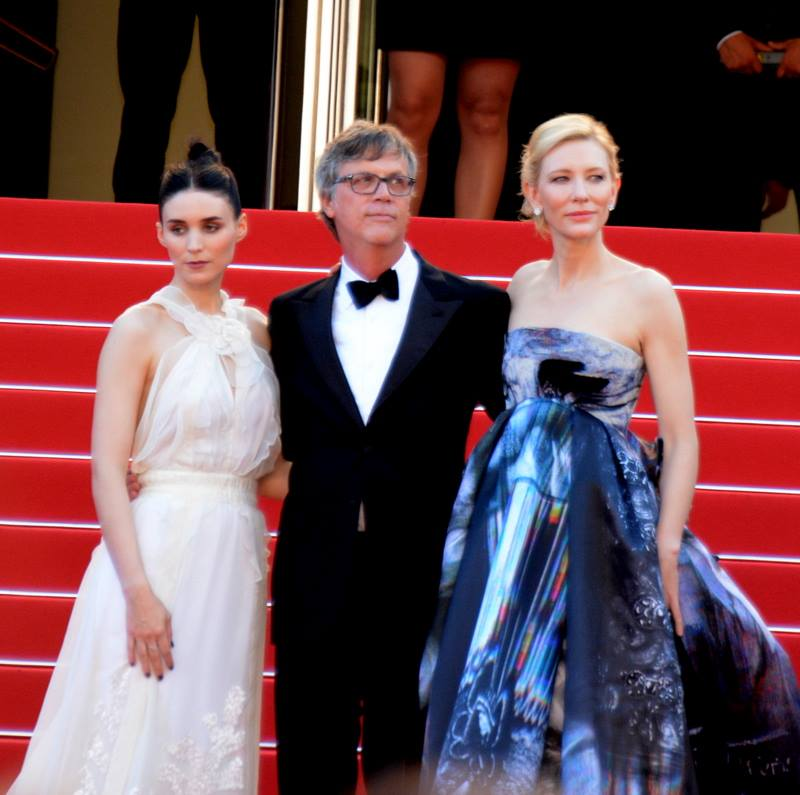
Rooney Mara, Todd Haynes and Cate Blanchett during premiere of Carol at the 2015 Cannes Film Festival

The first official image from Carol, released by Film4, appeared in the London Evening Standard in May 2014. Despite being completed in late 2014, producers withheld the film until 2015, to benefit from a film festival launch. (Note: In 2015, producer Elizabeth Karlsen said: "It's not easy getting an independent film out there anymore, especially when it's female-led, it's lesbian, it's period.") In October 2014, Haynes and Vachon announced that it would premiere in the spring of 2015 and be released in the fall.

Carol had its world premiere at the 2015 Cannes Film Festival. It made its North American debut at the Telluride Film Festival on September 4, and screened at the New York Film Festival on October 9, 2015. The film premiered in the United Kingdom at the BFI London Film Festival's Gala event on October 14, 2015.

Originally scheduled for a December 18 release in the United States, Carol opened in limited release on November 20, 2015. It received a platform release in the country, expanding from four to 16 locations on December 11, and then to 180 theaters on December 25, reaching over 520 locations by the weekend of January 8, 2016. The film went into wide release on January 15, 2016. Carol was released nationwide in the UK on November 27, 2015.

In December 2015, The Hollywood Reporter said that Russian distributor Arthouse had acquired rights to release the film in Russia in March 2016. Its CEO stated that it was "a huge challenge because of the federal 'gay propaganda' law that victimizes the Russian LGBT community", which would "prevent Carol [being] sold to major TV channels or even being advertised on federal networks". He noted that "some cinemas will refuse to book the film", but "the controversy ... will help us market Carol to the right audience", adding that he believed it would "appeal to the public way beyond the LGBT community." It was released in Russia on March 10, 2016.

In March 2016, a 35 mm film screening was held at the London LGBT Film Festival. The Metrograph, an independent cinema in New York, hosted a special 35 mm screening event, followed by a Q&A with Haynes, Vachon and Lachman. The event was sold out, and a second and third screening were added.

== Home media ==
Carol was made available for digital download on March 4, 2016. The film was released on DVD, Blu-ray and video on demand on March 15, 2016, in the United States by Anchor Bay Entertainment, and on March 21, 2016, in the United Kingdom by StudioCanal. Disc format bonus features include a behind-the-scenes gallery, a Q&A interview with the cast and filmmakers, and (for the UK version) limited-edition art cards. As of March 10, 2016, both the DVD and Blu-ray were no. 7 in pre-order sales in the United States; followed by ranking no. 18 in retail sales the week of commercial release. In the United Kingdom, the DVD debut charted at no. 7 and the Blu-ray at no. 12 of "Top 100" sales for both formats. As of 2025, sales of the DVD and Blu-ray in the U.S. and Canada totaled $2.2 million.

In the United States, Carol premiered on premium cable channel Showtime on October 8, 2016, and on Showtime on Demand service and Showtime Anytime streaming app on October 9, 2016. The film became available for streaming on Netflix on September 20, 2017.

== Box office ==
As of March 31, 2016, Carol had grossed $12.7 million in the U.S. and Canada, and as of January 8, 2019, $30.1 million in other countries, for a worldwide total of $42.8 million against a budget of $11.8 million. In the United Kingdom, the film earned £540,632 ($812,000) in its opening weekend from 206 screens, ranking Number seven of the top ten films for the weekend. Carol had grossed $4.0 million in the UK as of April 3, 2016.

In the United States, the film began its limited run on November 20 at four theaters—the Paris and Angelika Theater in New York and the ArcLight Hollywood and Landmark Theatre in Los Angeles—and was projected to earn around $50,000 per theater. It grossed $253,510 in its opening weekend at the four locations, the best opening of Haynes's films. Its per-theater average of $63,378 was the third-largest of 2015. In its second weekend, the film grossed $203,076, with a "robust" average of $50,769 per location, the best of the week, bringing its nine-day cumulative to $588,355. In its third weekend at the four locations, Carol earned $147,241, averaging $36,810, the highest for the third week in a row.

The film expanded from four to 16 theaters in its fourth week, and was projected to average an estimated $10,000 over the weekend. In its fourth weekend, it grossed $338,000, averaging $21,105 per screen, and bringing its U.S. cumulative total to $1.2 million. The film was projected to earn an estimated $218,000 from 16 theaters in its fifth weekend. It grossed $231,137, averaging $14,446 per theater. Carol then expanded to 180 theaters. In it sixth weekend, the film made $1.1 million, with a $6,075 average across 180 locations; its U.S. gross was $2.9 million, with $7.8 million worldwide from seven other countries. Carol reached $5 million in the United States in its seventh weekend.

== Critical reception ==
Carol received a ten-minute standing ovation at its Cannes Film Festival international press screening and premiere. Critics praised Haynes's direction, Blanchett's and Mara's performances, the cinematography, costumes and musical score, and deemed it a strong contender for a Cannes award. On review aggregator Rotten Tomatoes, the film has a 94% rating based on reviews from 320 critics, and an average rating of 8.60/10. The website's critical consensus states: "Shaped by Todd Haynes' deft direction and powered by a strong cast led by Cate Blanchett and Rooney Mara, Carol lives up to its groundbreaking source material." Carol was named the best-reviewed romance film of 2015 in Rotten Tomatoes' annual Golden Tomato Awards. On Metacritic, the film holds a score of 94 out of 100, based on 45 reviews, indicating "universal acclaim", and has been designated a Metacritic "Must-See" movie. It is the best-reviewed film of 2015.

Kate Stables wrote in Sight & Sound: "Elegant restraint is the film's watchword ... In this enjoyably deliberate film, each shot and scene is carefully composed to pay homage to 50s cinema, yet infused with an emotional ambiguity which feels decidedly contemporary." Kenneth Turan of the Los Angeles Times wrote that it is "a serious melodrama about the geometry of desire, a dreamy example of heightened reality that fully engages emotions despite the exact calculations with which it's been made... Carol's lush but controlled visual look is completely intoxicating." A. O. Scott wrote in The New York Times: "At once ardent and analytical, cerebral and swooning, Carol is a study in human magnetism, in the physics and optics of eros." Amy Taubin from Film Comment wrote: "The narrative, precisely chiseled by Phyllis Nagy from the ungainly novel, is deceptively simple ... What's remarkable about Carol is that it seems to exist entirely in the present moment—to be precise, in that electric, elastic, heart-stopping/heart-racing present of romantic desire. It is a film composed of gestures and glances, its delicacy a veiled promise of abandon. And it could not exist without the extraordinary performances of Blanchett and Mara." David Stratton of The Australian wrote: "The meeting of these two women is an electrifying scene; their eyes make contact, and nothing of significance is said, apart from the usual interaction between shopper and shop assistant, but Haynes and his wonderful actors make it very clear that something momentous has occurred—love at first sight."

Geoffrey Macnab of The Independent said: "Todd Haynes's latest feature is a subtle, moving and deceptive story of two women (brilliantly played in very contrasting styles by Cate Blanchett and Rooney Mara) who refuse to live against 'their own grain' ... Phyllis Nagy's screenplay emphasises their steeliness and self-reliance. In sly and subversive fashion, Haynes is laying bare the tensions in a society that refuses to acknowledge 'difference' of any sort." Andrew O'Hehir of Salon wrote: "From its opening shots of the autumnal, rain-swept streets of New York sometime in the middle of the last century...Carol establishes a mood of mournful romance, half nostalgic and half ominous, that never lets go." Peter Howell of the Toronto Star wrote: "Everything clicks into place for this gorgeous achievement. Cinematographer Ed Lachman shot on Super 16 mm film to achieve era-specific muted colours and softer textures. Precise production design and a palette steeped in shades of green and red (appropriate to the Yuletide setting) make watching it seem like stepping inside an Edward Hopper painting." Mark Kermode wrote in The Guardian: "This superb adaptation of Patricia Highsmith's 1952 novel The Price of Salt doesn't put a foot wrong. From Phyllis Nagy's alluringly uncluttered script to Cate Blanchett's sturdily tremulous performance as a society woman with everything to lose, this brilliantly captures the thrills, tears and fears of forbidden love."

In Variety, Justin Chang wrote: "despite their obvious differences in class and background, Therese and Carol seem to ease themselves (and the audience) so quickly and naturally into a bond that they have no interest in defining, or even really discussing—a choice that works not only for an era when their love dared not speak its name, but also for Haynes' faith in the power of the medium to achieve an eloquence beyond words." Francine Prose in The New York Review of Books commented on "the delicacy, the patience, and the sheer amount of screen time that it lavishes on the experience of falling in love: the hesitations and doubts, the seemingly casual exchanges freighted with meaning and suppressed emotion, the simple happiness of being together." Anita Katz from the San Francisco Examiner said: "Haynes triumphs in his quest to make a sweeping romantic melodrama with social substance at the core. As a period piece, the movie immerses us in 1950s styles and attitudes. As a sensory experience, it dazzles with everything from rain-streaked windows to Therese's plaid tam-o-shanter ... Haynes powerfully addresses the consequences of ignorance and intolerance. Impressively textured, the drama is filled with secret glances and other subtle aspects of forbidden love." Ann Hornaday of The Washington Post wrote: "Carol is a performance of a performance, whereby codes and signals convey the most essential stuff of life, while the kabuki of being 'normal' plays out with the carefully cultivated—and patently false—perfection of the toy train village Carol buys from Therese at their first meeting. Working from a carefully crafted script by Phyllis Nagy, Haynes portrays two people thirstily drinking each other in, while on the outside, they sip tea and cocktails with prim decorum." Naming it "one of the year's very best films", Peter Travers of Rolling Stone said: "Camera virtuoso Edward Lachman finds visual poetry in the hothouse eroticism that envelops Carol and Therese, an amateur photographer who keeps framing Carol in her lens. Blanchett, a dream walking in Sandy Powell's frocks, delivers a master class in acting. And Mara is flawless ... [it's] a romantic spellbinder that cuts deep." Stephen Whitty in the Daily News praised Carol as a "lesbian romance where nobody says the word 'lesbian'.... because this isn't just a lesbian story. It's a human one."

In a series of articles about the best of the 2010s in film, IndieWire ranked Carol the seventh-best film of the decade; Blanchett's performance the second-best acting performance; the opening scene the sixth-best film scene; and Burwell's score the second-best film score. The screenplay was named the 19th-best American screenplay of the century. It was ranked fourth best movie of 2015 by The Washington Post.

== Audience reception ==
The admiration of Carol resulted in a fandom community that has been referred to as the "Cult of Carol". In June 2017, the tribute comedy short film Carol Support Group premiered at the San Francisco International LGBTQ Film Festival. Directed by Allison Tate, the film tells the story of mayhem in "a support group for people addicted to the movie Carol." The tagline of the film's poster, "Some people are addicts forever", is a parody of the "Some people change your life forever" tagline of StudioCanal's original Carol film poster.

Filmmakers John Waters and Edgar Wright named Carol one of their favorite films of 2015 and of all time, respectively.

== Accolades ==
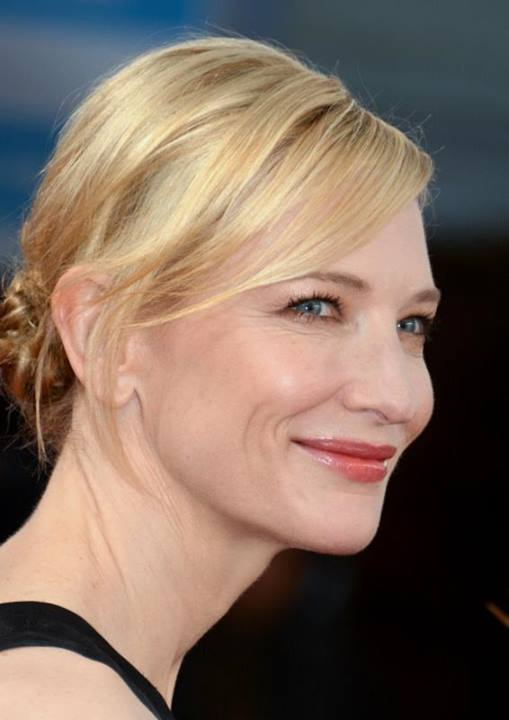
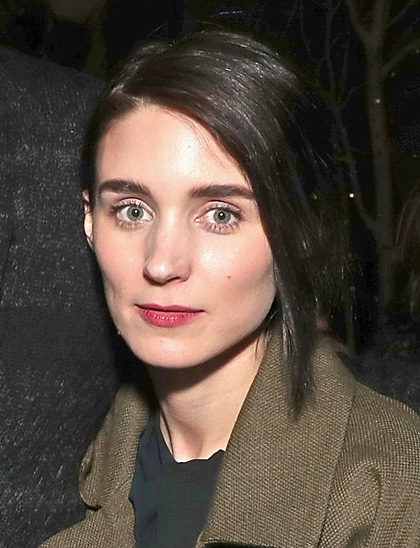
The performances of Cate Blanchett and Rooney Mara garnered widespread critical acclaim, earning them Academy Award nominations for Best Actress and Best Supporting Actress respectively.

Carol has received over 290 industry and critic nominations, and over 100 awards and honours. The film was selected to compete for the Palme d'Or at the 2015 Cannes Film Festival, where it won the Queer Palm and Mara tied for the Best Actress award. It won the Audience Award at the Whistler Film Festival, and the Chicago International Film Festival's Gold Q Hugo Award for exhibiting "new artistic perspectives on sexuality and identity". Carol was the "overall favorite" on IndieWire's critics' poll of the best films and performances from the New York Film Festival, topping the Best Narrative Feature, Best Director, Best Lead Performance (Blanchett and Mara), Best Screenplay, and Best Cinematography categories. Lachman was awarded the grand prize for Best Cinematography by the Camerimage International Film Festival. The jury stated:

[Carol] seamlessly evokes the period by paying homage to the great photography of the time. It also creates its own unique cinematic language and pulls the viewer deeper and deeper into a world where something as simple as love comes at a staggering cost. Its delicate and precise exploration of emotion through color and light led us to discuss what it meant to achieve mastery of our craft. [Lachman] is, for us, a master and [Carol] is a masterpiece.

In September 2015, The Weinstein Company confirmed that it would campaign for Blanchett as Lead Actress and Mara as Supporting Actress for the 88th Academy Awards. The film received six Academy Award nominations, including Best Actress, and garnered five Golden Globe Award nominations, including Best Motion Picture – Drama. It received nine BAFTA Award nominations, including Best Film. The film was nominated for six Independent Spirit Awards and won for Best Cinematography. It also received nine Critics' Choice Movie Award nominations, including Best Film. Blanchett and Mara received Screen Actors Guild Award nominations for Outstanding Performance by a Female Actor in a Leading Role and Outstanding Performance by a Female Actor in a Supporting Role, respectively.

The New York Film Critics Circle awarded Carol Best Film, Best Director, Best Cinematography, and Best Screenplay. The film won Best Music from the Los Angeles Film Critics Association and was runner-up for Best Director, Best Cinematography, and Best Production Design. The National Society of Film Critics awarded Haynes Best Director and Lachman Best Cinematography. Haynes and Lachman also received the Boston Society of Film Critics Award for Best Director and Best Cinematography. Lachman won the London Film Critics' Circle Technical Achievement Award. Carol won five Dorian Awards, including Film of the Year, Director of the Year, Performance of the Year – Actress (Blanchett), LGBTQ Film of the Year and Screenplay of the Year. It was awarded the GLAAD Media Award for Outstanding Film – Wide Release. The Frankfurt Book Fair named Carol the Best International Literary Adaptation. The American Film Institute selected Carol as one of its ten Movies of the Year. The AFI Awards jury rationale read:

CAROL sets the screen aglow with the light of longing as Cate Blanchett and Rooney Mara transform a period piece into a timeless cry from defiant hearts. Todd Haynes serves their romance as a restorative cocktail, adding splashes of color to a repressive Eisenhower era, when love was often seen in black-and-white. From luminous performances to sumptuous production, this is cinema's promise fulfilled—a haunting portrait in moving images, painted in the universal hues of heartache and passion.

In March 2016, the British Film Institute named Carol the best LGBT film of all time, according to over one hundred film experts in a poll encompassing over 80 years of cinema. In a 2016 BBC poll of 177 critics from 36 countries, it was voted the 69th-best film of the 21st century. In November 2019, The New York Times named it one of the favorite films of the 2010s, with critic A. O. Scott remarking, "It keeps taking me by surprise." In June 2025, Carol ranked Number 72 in a poll of the best 100 movies of the 21st Century by The New York Times; and Number 155 by its readers. In July 2025, it ranked Number 14 on Rolling Stone's list of "The 100 Best Movies of the 21st Century."

== Controversies ==
=== Academy Awards omissions ===
The omission of Carol from Best Picture and Best Director categories prompted speculation from journalists about the perceived indifference of the Academy of Motion Picture Arts and Sciences to female- and LGBT-centred films. Nate Scott of USA Today called it "the standout snub" of the ceremony, "one made all the more ridiculous because of the bloated Best Picture field". Nico Lang of The A.V. Club said that though the film had been considered a "lock" for a Best Picture nomination, the omission "shouldn't have been a major shock" given the controversy over Brokeback Mountain's loss a decade earlier. Jason Bailey of Flavorwire said that most Best Picture nominees that include gay themes "put them firmly in the realm of subplots". "Carol's most transgressive quality", he declared, "is its refusal to engage in such shenanigans; this is a film about full-blooded gay lives, not tragic gay deaths."

At HitFix, Louis Virtel suggested that Academy members' reception of Carol was hurt by its focus on self-determined women. Matthew Jacobs of The Huffington Post expressed similar sentiments and felt that the academy's artistic tastes were "too conventional to recognize its brilliance". Richard Lawson of Vanity Fair said that though its "themes of passion and heartache may be universal", the film may be "too gay", speaking "in a vernacular that, I'd guess, only queer people are fully fluent in." He added that the lack of "gushing melodrama" put the film at a disadvantage. Dorothy Snarker of IndieWire attributed the omissions to the academy's demographics, and agreed that Carol may be too gay and too female "for the largely old white male voting base" to connect with. She also considered that the successes of the LGBT rights movement in the U.S. may have partly been responsible for the lack of "political urgency" around the film.

In The Advocate, Rebekah Allen argued that "there are those who simply do not want to see a lesbian love story on screen." Trish Bendix of AfterEllen said the Best Picture snub was a "reminder of the patriarchal society we continue to live in, where films that create a space for women to live happily without men and without punishment will not be rewarded." Marcie Bianco of Quartz described the film as "centered around women's desire" and structured in a way that "elevates the power of women's gaze". The omission from Best Picture, she concluded, illustrates "yet again how sexism operates in the world, and in the Academy specifically, as the refusal to see women as protagonists and agents of desire." In Paper magazine, Carey O'Donnell wrote that gay romances are only "Oscar surefires" when they use the tragedy-desolation-demise "equation", and that "a depiction of two strong women in love with each other ... seems to still be troubling to many". David Ehrlich of Rolling Stone wrote that the film's "patience and precision" did not conform to Academy tastes, but its legacy "will doubtlessly survive this year's most egregious snub". Haynes said that he thought having two female leads was "a factor" in the omission.

Ben Child of The Guardian noted that Carol at least won several major Dorian Awards, representing "a fillip for Haynes and his team after the Cannes prize-winner unexpectedly missed out on Academy awards nominations for best film and best director."

=== Oscar category ===
Despite winning Best Actress at the Cannes Film Festival (shared with Emmanuelle Bercot) and receiving a Golden Globe nomination for Best Actress in a Motion Picture – Drama alongside Blanchett, Mara was nominated for the Academy Award for Best Supporting Actress. The Weinstein Company decided on the category placement to avoid the co-leads competing in the same category. In an interview with The New York Times, Mara seemed displeased by the decision.

=== Censorship ===
In January 2016, ABC rejected a prime-time commercial featuring a snippet of the nude scene between Carol and Therese, which caused The Weinstein Company to reedit the television trailer. In August 2016, Delta Air Lines was criticized on social media for airing an in-flight entertainment version of Carol in which the love scenes had been deleted. Nagy replied on Twitter that, in contrast to Delta, American and United Airlines had provided the full theatrical release. Comedian Cameron Esposito discovered during her flight that even the kissing scenes were cut from Delta's version.

== Soundtrack ==
The soundtrack was released in both digital download and CD album format by Varèse Sarabande on November 20, 2015, followed by a double album vinyl release on June 24, 2016. It includes the original score by Carter Burwell and additional music by The Clovers, Billie Holiday, Georgia Gibbs, Les Paul and Mary Ford, and Jo Stafford. Songs not featured on the CD include "Willow Weep for Me" performed by Vince Giordano & the Nighthawks Orchestra, "Perdido" by Woody Herman, and "That's the Chance You Take" by Eddie Fisher. "A Garden in the Rain" by The Four Aces, "Slow Poke" by Pee Wee King, and "Why Don't You Believe Me" by Patti Page are also not included, but appear in the vinyl version.

== See also ==
- Desert Hearts (a film with similar themes set in 1959)
- List of Christmas films
- List of LGBT-related films of 2015
- List of LGBT-related films by storyline
- New Queer Cinema
- List of films considered the best
