= List of awards and nominations received by Saoirse Ronan =

Saoirse Ronan awards and nominations
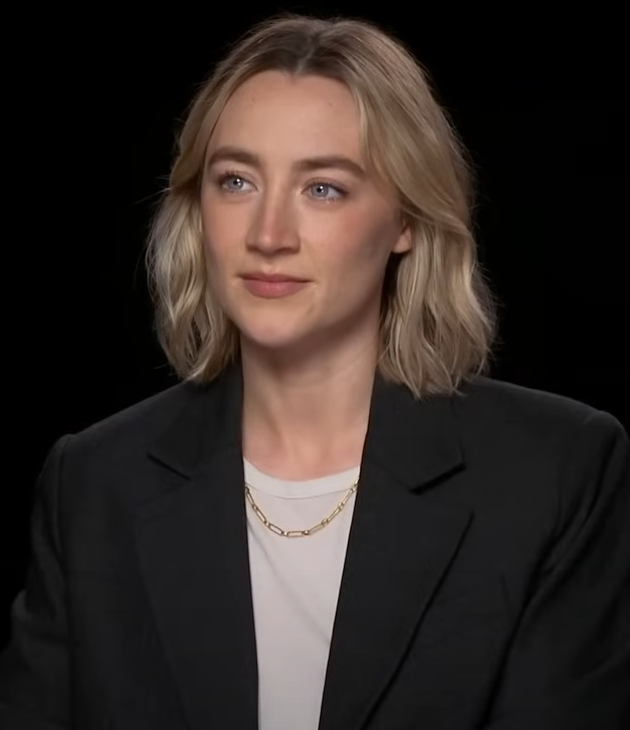
- Ronan in 2024
Awards and nominations
Award	Wins	Nominations
Academy Awards	0	4
Actor Awards	0	4
BAFTA Awards	1	9
Critics' Choice	1	11
Golden Globes	1	4

Totals (Note: Certain award groups do not simply award one winner. They acknowledge several different recipients, have runners-up, and have third place. Since this is a specific recognition and is different from losing an award, runner-up mentions are considered wins in this award tally. For simplification and to avoid errors, each award in this list has been presumed to have had a prior nomination.)
- Wins: 69
- Nominations: 137

Saoirse Ronan is an Irish and American actress known for her roles on stage and screen. She has received various accolades including a Golden Globe Award as well as nominations for four Academy Awards, seven BAFTA Awards, and four Screen Actors Guild Awards.

Ronan came to prominence in 2007 with her co-starring role in the Joe Wright period drama Atonement (2007), for which she received nominations for the Academy Award for Best Supporting Actress, the BAFTA Award for Best Actress in a Supporting Role, and the Golden Globe Award for Best Supporting Actress, making her the seventh-youngest actress to receive an Oscar nomination in this category. In 2015, Ronan starred in the romantic-drama film Brooklyn, for which she received nominations for the Academy Award for Best Actress in a Leading Role, the BAFTA Award for Best Actress in a Leading Role, the Golden Globe Award for Best Actress – Motion Picture Drama, and the Screen Actors Guild Award for Outstanding Performance by a Female Actor in a Leading Role. Aged 21 at the time, she is the eighth-youngest Best Actress nominee.

In 2017, Ronan was nominated yet again for the Academy Award for Best Actress, the BAFTA Award for Best Actress in a Leading Role, and the Screen Actors Guild Award for Outstanding Performance by a Female Actor in a Leading Role, while winning the Golden Globe Award for Best Actress – Motion Picture Musical or Comedy, for her role in Greta Gerwig's coming of age comedy Lady Bird. Two years later, yet again in 2019, Ronan was nominated yet again for the Academy Award for Best Actress, the BAFTA Award for Best Actress in a Leading Role, and Golden Globe Award for Best Actress – Motion Picture Drama, for her role as Josephine "Jo" March in Little Women. At 25 years and six months of age, Ronan is the second youngest person to accrue four Academy Award nominations, behind only American actress Jennifer Lawrence.

== Major associations ==
=== Academy Awards ===
Year	Category	Nominated work	Result	Ref.
2008	Best Supporting Actress	Atonement	Nominated	
2016	Best Actress	Brooklyn	Nominated	
2018	Best Actress	Lady Bird	Nominated	
2020	Best Actress	Little Women	Nominated	

=== Actor Awards ===
Year	Category	Nominated work	Result	Ref.
2015	Outstanding Cast in a Motion Picture (Note: Shared with the cast)	The Grand Budapest Hotel	Nominated	
2016	Outstanding Actress in a Leading Role	Brooklyn	Nominated	
2018	Outstanding Actress in a Leading Role	Lady Bird	Nominated	
2018	Outstanding Cast in a Motion Picture	Lady Bird	Nominated	

=== BAFTA Awards ===
Year	Category	Nominated work	Result	Ref.
British Academy Film Awards
2008	Best Actress in a Supporting Role	Atonement	Nominated	
2010	Best Actress in a Leading Role	The Lovely Bones	Nominated	
2016	Best Actress in a Leading Role	Brooklyn	Nominated	
2018	Best Actress in a Leading Role	Lady Bird	Nominated	
2020	Best Actress in a Leading Role	Little Women	Nominated	
2025	Best Actress in a Leading Role	The Outrun	Nominated	
2025	Outstanding British Film	The Outrun	Nominated	
British Academy Scotland Awards
2025	Best Actress in Film/Television	The Outrun	Won	
2025	Best Feature Film	The Outrun	Nominated	

=== Critics' Choice Awards ===
Year	Category	Nominated work	Result	Ref.
Critics' Choice Movie Awards
2008	Best Young Actress	Atonement	Nominated	
2010	Best Actress	The Lovely Bones	Nominated	
2010	Best Young Actor/Actress	The Lovely Bones	Won	
2012	Best Young Actor/Actress	Hanna	Nominated	
2015	Best Acting Ensemble	The Grand Budapest Hotel	Nominated	
2016	Best Actress	Brooklyn	Nominated	
2018	Best Actress	Lady Bird	Nominated	
2018	Best Acting Ensemble	Lady Bird	Nominated	
2018	Best Actress in a Comedy	Lady Bird	Nominated	
2020	Best Actress	Little Women	Nominated	
2020	Best Acting Ensemble	Little Women	Nominated	

=== Golden Globe Awards ===
Year	Category	Nominated work	Result	Ref.
2008	Best Supporting Actress – Motion Picture	Atonement	Nominated	
2016	Best Actress in a Motion Picture – Drama	Brooklyn	Nominated	
2018	Best Actress in a Motion Picture – Musical or Comedy	Lady Bird	Won	
2020	Best Actress in a Motion Picture – Drama	Little Women	Nominated	

== Film critic awards ==
Year	Category	Nominated work	Result	Ref.
Alliance of Women Film Journalists
2007	Best Newcomer	Atonement	Won	
2012	Kick Ass Award for Best Female Action Star	Hanna	Won	
2018	Best Animated Female	Loving Vincent	Nominated	
2019	Best Actress	Little Women	Nominated	
Austin Film Critics Association
2015	Best Actress	Brooklyn	Nominated	
2017	Best Actress	Lady Bird	Nominated	
2019	Best Ensemble	Little Women	Nominated	
Boston Online Film Critics Association
2015	Best Actress	Brooklyn	Won	
Boston Society of Film Critics
2015	Best Actress	Brooklyn	Runner-up	
2019	Best Actress	Little Women	Won	
2019	Best Cast	Little Women	Won	
Chicago Film Critics Association
2015	Best Actress	Brooklyn	Nominated	
2017	Best Actress	Lady Bird	Won	
Chicago Independent Film Critics Circle
2017	Best Actress	Lady Bird	Won	
2017	Best Ensemble Cast	Lady Bird	Nominated	
Columbus Film Critics Association
2015	Best Ensemble	The Grand Budapest Hotel	Won	
2016	Best Actress	Brooklyn	Runner-up	
2018	Best Actress	Lady Bird	Runner-up	
2018	Best Ensemble	Lady Bird	Won	
2020	Best Actress	Little Women	Nominated	
2020	Best Ensemble	Little Women	Nominated	
Dallas-Fort Worth Film Critics Association
2007	Best Supporting Actress	Atonement	Nominated	
2015	Best Actress	Brooklyn	Runner-up	
2017	Best Actress	Lady Bird	Runner-up	
2019	Best Actress	Little Women	4th place	
Denver Film Critics Society
2016	Best Actress	Brooklyn	Nominated	
2017	Best Actress	Lady Bird	Won	
Detroit Film Critics Society
2009	Best Actress	The Lovely Bones	Nominated	
2014	Best Ensemble	The Grand Budapest Hotel	Won	
2015	Best Actress	Brooklyn	Won	
2017	Best Actress	Lady Bird	Nominated	
2017	Best Ensemble	Lady Bird	Nominated	
Dublin Film Critics' Circle
2007	Breakthrough Award	Atonement	Won	
2015	Best Actress	Brooklyn	Runner-up	
2018	Best Actress	Lady Bird	Runner-up	
2019	Best Actress	Little Women	Runner-up	
2024	Best Actress	The Outrun	Nominated	
Film Critics Circle of Australia
2009	Best Supporting Actress	Death Defying Acts	Nominated	
Florida Film Critics Circle
2014	Best Cast	The Grand Budapest Hotel	Won	
2015	Best Actress	Brooklyn	Nominated	
2017	Best Actress	Lady Bird	Nominated	
2017	Best Cast	Lady Bird	Nominated	
2019	Best Cast	Little Women	Won	
Georgia Film Critics Association
2015	Best Ensemble	The Grand Budapest Hotel	Won	
2016	Best Actress	Brooklyn	Nominated	
2017	Best Actress	Lady Bird	Won	
2017	Best Ensemble	Lady Bird	Nominated	
2020	Best Actress	Little Women	Nominated	
2020	Best Ensemble	Little Women	Won	
Hawaii Film Critics Society
2018	Best Actress	Lady Bird	Nominated	
Hollywood Music in Media Awards
2024	Song – Onscreen Performance (TV Show/Limited Series)	"Winter Coat" (from Blitz)	Nominated	
Houston Film Critics Society
2009	Best Actress	The Lovely Bones	Nominated	
2016	Best Actress	Brooklyn	Nominated	
2018	Best Actress	Lady Bird	Nominated	
2020	Best Actress	Little Women	Nominated	
Indiana Film Journalists Association
2017	Best Actress	Lady Bird	Won	
IndieWire Critics Poll
2015	Best Lead Actress	Brooklyn	Runner-up	
2017	Best Lead Actress	Lady Bird	Won	
2019	Best Actress	Little Women	9th place	
International Cinephile Society
2018	Best Actress	Lady Bird	Nominated	
2018	Best Ensemble	Lady Bird	Runner-up	
Iowa Film Critics
2016	Best Actress	Brooklyn	Nominated	
2017	Best Actress	Lady Bird	Won	
Kansas City Film Critics Circle
2015	Best Actress	Brooklyn	Nominated	
Las Vegas Film Critics Society
2007	Youth in Film – Female	Atonement	Won	
2009	Youth in Film	The Lovely Bones	Won	
London Film Critics' Circle
2007	British Supporting Actress of the Year	Atonement	Nominated	
2007	British Breakthrough – Acting	Atonement	Nominated	
2009	Young British Performer of the Year	The Lovely Bones	Nominated	
2010	Young British Performer of the Year	The Way Back	Nominated	
2011	Young British Performer of the Year	Hanna	Nominated	
2013	Young British Performer of the Year	Byzantium	Nominated	
2014	Young British Performer of the Year	The Grand Budapest Hotel	Nominated	
2015	Actress of the Year	Brooklyn	Nominated	
2015	British/Irish Actress of the Year	Brooklyn	Won	
2017	British/Irish Actress of the Year	Lady Bird	Nominated	
2019	British/Irish Actress of the Year	Little Women	Nominated	
2024	British/Irish Actress of the Year	Blitz	Nominated	
Los Angeles Film Critics Association
2015	Best Actress	Brooklyn	Runner-up	
Los Angeles Online Film Critics Society
2017	Best Actress	Lady Bird	Nominated	
2017	Best Actor or Actress under 23 Years Old	Lady Bird	Won	
National Society of Film Critics
2015	Best Actress	Brooklyn	Runner-up	
2017	Best Actress	Lady Bird	Runner-up	
New York Film Critics Circle
2015	Best Actress	Brooklyn	Won	
2017	Best Actress	Lady Bird	Won	
North Carolina Film Critics Association
2016	Best Actress	Brooklyn	Won	
2018	Best Actress	Lady Bird	Nominated	
North Dakota Film Society
2019	Best Actress	Little Women	Nominated	
2020	Best Actress	Ammonite	Nominated	
North Texas Film Critics Association
2018	Best Actress	Lady Bird	Nominated	
Oklahoma Film Critics Association
2018	Best Actress	Lady Bird	Nominated	
Online Film Critics Society
2008	Best Supporting Actress	Atonement	Nominated	
2015	Best Actress	Brooklyn	Nominated	
2017	Best Actress	Lady Bird	Nominated	
2017	Best Ensemble	Lady Bird	Nominated	
Phoenix Critics Circle
2015	Best Actress	Brooklyn	Nominated	
2017	Best Actress	Lady Bird	Nominated	
Phoenix Film Critics Society
2007	Best Youth in a Lead or Supporting Role – Female	Atonement	Won	
2009	Best Youth – Female	The Lovely Bones	Won	
2011	Best Youth in a Lead or Supporting Role – Female	Hanna	Won	
2014	Best Ensemble Acting	The Grand Budapest Hotel	Nominated	
2015	Best Actress in a Leading Role	Brooklyn	Nominated	
2017	Best Actress in a Leading Role	Lady Bird	Nominated	
San Diego Film Critics Society
2014	Best Performance by an Ensemble	The Grand Budapest Hotel	Nominated	
2015	Best Actress	Brooklyn	Nominated	
2017	Best Actress	Lady Bird	Nominated	
2017	Best Performance by an Ensemble	Lady Bird	Nominated	
2019	Best Actress	Little Women	Nominated	
San Francisco Film Critics Circle
2015	Best Actress	Brooklyn	Won	
2017	Best Actress	Lady Bird	Nominated	
Seattle Film Critics Society
2016	Best Actress	Brooklyn	Nominated	
2017	Best Actress	Lady Bird	Won	
2017	Best Ensemble Cast	Lady Bird	Nominated	
2019	Best Actress	Little Women	Nominated	
2019	Best Ensemble Cast	Little Women	Nominated	
Southeastern Film Critics Association
2014	Best Ensemble	The Grand Budapest Hotel	Won	
2015	Best Actress	Brooklyn	Nominated	
St. Louis Film Critics Association
2007	Best Supporting Actress	Atonement	Nominated	
2009	Best Actress	The Lovely Bones	Nominated	
2011	Best Actress	Hanna	Nominated	
2011	Special Merit	Hanna	Nominated	
2015	Best Actress	Brooklyn	Runner-up	
2017	Best Actress	Lady Bird	Nominated	
2019	Best Actress	Little Women	Nominated	
2024	Best Actress	The Outrun	Nominated	
Toronto Film Critics Association
2017	Best Actress	Lady Bird	Runner-up	
Utah Film Critics Association
2015	Best Actress	Brooklyn	Nominated	
Vancouver Film Critics Circle
2015	Best Actress	Brooklyn	Nominated	
2017	Best Actress	Lady Bird	Won	
2019	Best Actress	Little Women	Nominated	
Village Voice Film Poll
2015	Best Actress	Brooklyn	Runner-up	
2017	Best Lead Performance	Lady Bird	Won	
Washington D.C. Area Film Critics Association
2014	Best Acting Ensemble	The Grand Budapest Hotel	Nominated	
2015	Best Actress	Brooklyn	Won	
2017	Best Actress	Lady Bird	Nominated	
2019	Best Actress	Little Women	Nominated	
Women Film Critics Circle
2007	Best Young Actress	Atonement	Won	
2014	Best Young Actress	The Grand Budapest Hotel	Nominated	
2015	Best Young Actress	Brooklyn	Nominated	
2017	Best Comedic Actress	Lady Bird	Nominated	
2019	Best Screen Couple	Little Women	Nominated (Note: Shared with Louis Garrel)	
2021	Best Screen Couple	Ammonite	Won (Note: Shared with Kate Winslet)	

== Other awards and nominations ==
Year	Category	Nominated work	Result	Ref.
AACTA International Awards
2016	Best Actress	Brooklyn	Nominated	
2018	Best Actress	Lady Bird	Nominated	
2020	Best Actress	Little Women	Won	
2021	Best Supporting Actress	Ammonite	Nominated	
Australian Film Institute
2008	Young Actor's Award	Death Defying Acts	Nominated	
Awards Circuit Community Awards
2007	Best Actress in a Supporting Role	Atonement	Nominated	
2015	Best Actress in a Leading Role	Brooklyn	Nominated	
2017	Best Actress in a Leading Role	Lady Bird	Nominated	
2017	Best Cast Ensemble	Lady Bird	Won	
B-Movie Film Festival
2012	Best Actress	Hanna	Won	
British Independent Film Awards
2013	Best Actress	How I Live Now	Nominated	
2015	Best Actress	Brooklyn	Won	
2024	Best Lead Performance	The Outrun	Nominated	
2024	Best British Independent Film	The Outrun	Nominated	
2024	Chlotrudis Awards			
2016	Best Actress	Brooklyn	Nominated	
CinEuphoria Awards
2017	Best Actress – International Competition	Brooklyn	Nominated	
2019	Best Ensemble – International Competition	Lady Bird	Won	
Dorian Awards
2016	Film Performance of the Year – Actress	Brooklyn	Nominated	
2018	Film Performance of the Year – Actress	Lady Bird	Nominated	
Empire Awards
2007	Best Newcomer	Atonement	Nominated	
Evening Standard British Film Awards
2008	Most Promising Newcomer	Atonement	Nominated	
2016	Best Actress	Brooklyn	Nominated	
2018	Best Actress	Lady Bird	Nominated	
Fangoria Chainsaw Awards
2014	Best Actress	Byzantium	Nominated	
Golden Schmoes Awards
2017	Best Actress of the Year	Lady Bird	Nominated	
Gotham Independent Film Awards
2017	Best Actress	Lady Bird	Won	
2024	Outstanding Lead Performance	The Outrun	Nominated	
Hollywood Film Awards
2015	New Hollywood Award	Brooklyn	Won	
IGN Summer Movie Awards
2011	Best Movie Actress	Hanna	Nominated	
Independent Spirit Awards
2018	Best Female Lead	Lady Bird	Nominated	
International Online Cinema Awards
2008	Best Supporting Actress	Atonement	Nominated	
2016	Best Actress	Brooklyn	Runner-up	
2018	Best Actress	Lady Bird	Won	
2018	Best Ensemble	Lady Bird	Won	
Irish Film & Television Awards
2008	Actress in a Supporting Role – Film	Atonement	Won	
2008	Rising Star	Atonement	Won	
2009	Actress in a Supporting Role – Film	Death Defying Acts	Won	
2009	Actress in a Lead Role – Film	City of Ember	Nominated	
2010	Actress in a Lead Role – Film	The Lovely Bones	Won	
2011	Actress in a Supporting Role – Film	The Way Back	Won	
2012	Actress in a Lead Role – Film	Hanna	Won	
2014	Actress in a Lead Role – Film	Byzantium	Won	
2016	Actress in a Lead Role – Film	Brooklyn	Won	
2018	Actress in a Lead Role – Film	Lady Bird	Won	
2020	Actress in a Lead Role – Film	Little Women	Nominated	
2021	Actress in a Supporting Role – Film	Ammonite	Nominated	
2024	Actress in a Lead Role – Film	Foe	Nominated	
2025	Actress in a Lead Role – Film	The Outrun	Won	
2025	Best International Film	The Outrun	Nominated	
2025	Actress in a Supporting Role – Film	Blitz	Won	
Italian Online Movie Awards
2008	Best Supporting Actress	Atonement	Nominated	
Kerry Film Festival
2012	Maureen O'Hara Award		Won	
MTV Movie & TV Awards
2018	Best Actress in a Movie	Lady Bird	Nominated	
Online Film & Television Association
2008	Best Supporting Actress	Atonement	Nominated	
2008	Best Breakthrough Performance: Female	Atonement	Won	
2008	Best Youth Performance	Atonement	Won	
2010	Best Youth Performance	The Lovely Bones	Won	
2016	Best Actress	Brooklyn	Nominated	
2017	Best Actress	Lady Bird	Won	
2017	Best Ensemble	Lady Bird	Runner-up	
Palm Springs International Film Festival
2016	International Star Award	Brooklyn	Won	
2018	Desert Palm Achievement Award	Lady Bird	Won	
Satellite Awards
2007	Best Supporting Actress – Motion Picture	Atonement	Nominated	
2016	Best Actress – Motion Picture	Brooklyn	Won	
2018	Best Actress – Motion Picture	Lady Bird	Nominated	
Saturn Award
2010	Best Performance by a Younger Actor	The Lovely Bones	Won	
2012	Best Performance by a Younger Actor	Hanna	Nominated	
2014	Best Performance by a Younger Actor	How I Live Now	Nominated	
Santa Barbara International Film Festival
2010	Virtuoso Award	The Lovely Bones	Won	
2016	Outstanding Performer of the Year	Brooklyn	Won	
2018	Santa Barbara Award	Lady Bird	Won	
2018	Montecito Award		Won	
Scream Awards
2010	Best Fantasy Actress	The Lovely Bones	Nominated	
Teen Choice Awards
2013	Choice Movie Actress: Sci-Fi/Fantasy	The Host	Nominated	
2018	Choice Movie Actress: Drama	Lady Bird	Nominated	
Women's Image Network Awards
2015	Outstanding Actress Feature Film	Brooklyn	Nominated	
2018	Outstanding Actress Feature Film	Mary Queen of Scots	Nominated	
World Soundtrack Awards
2015	Best Original Song Written Directly For a Film	Lost River	Nominated	
Young Artist Award
2008	Best Leading Young Actress in a Feature Film	Atonement	Nominated	
2010	Best Leading Young Actress in a Feature Film	The Lovely Bones	Nominated	
2012	Best Leading Young Actress in a Feature Film	Hanna	Nominated	

== Critics associations ==
Year	Association	Category	Work	Result	Ref.
2007	Academy Awards	Best Supporting Actress	Atonement	Nominated	
2007	British Academy Film Awards	Best Supporting Actress	Atonement	Nominated	
2007	Dallas-Fort Worth Film Critics Association	Best Supporting Actress	Atonement	Nominated	
2007	Golden Globe Awards	Best Supporting Actress	Atonement	Nominated	
2007	Online Film Critics Society	Best Supporting Actress	Atonement	Nominated	
2007	Online Film and Television Association	Best Supporting Actress	Atonement	Nominated	
2007	Satellite Awards	Best Supporting Actress	Atonement	Nominated	
2007	St. Louis Gateway Film Critics Association	Best Supporting Actress	Atonement	Nominated	
2015	AACTA International Awards	Best Actress	Brooklyn	Nominated	
2015	Academy Awards	Best Actress	Brooklyn	Nominated	
2015	Austin Film Critics Association	Best Actress	Brooklyn	Nominated	
2015	Boston Online Film Critics Association	Best Actress	Brooklyn	Won	
2015	Boston Society of Film Critics	Best Actress	Brooklyn	Runner-up	
2015	British Academy Film Awards	Best Actress	Brooklyn	Nominated	
2015	Central Ohio Film Critics Association	Best Actress	Brooklyn	Nominated	
2015	Chicago Film Critics Association	Best Actress	Brooklyn	Nominated	
2015	Critics' Choice Movie Awards	Best Actress	Brooklyn	Nominated	
2015	Dallas–Fort Worth Film Critics Association	Best Actress	Brooklyn	Nominated	
2015	Denver Film Critics Society	Best Actress	Brooklyn	Nominated	
2015	Detroit Film Critics Society	Best Actress	Brooklyn	Won	
2015	Dorian Awards	Best Actress	Brooklyn	Nominated	
2015	Florida Film Critics Circle	Best Actress	Brooklyn	Nominated	
2015	Georgia Film Critics Association	Best Actress	Brooklyn	Nominated	
2015	Golden Globe Awards	Best Actress – Drama	Brooklyn	Nominated	
2015	Houston Film Critics Society	Best Actress	Brooklyn	Nominated	
2015	Iowa Film Critics Association	Best Actress	Brooklyn	Nominated	
2015	Kansas City Film Critics Circle	Best Actress	Brooklyn	Nominated	
2015	London Film Critics Circle	Actress of the Year	Brooklyn	Nominated	
2015	Los Angeles Film Critics Association	Best Actress	Brooklyn	Runner-up	
2015	National Society of Film Critics	Best Actress	Brooklyn	Runner-up	
2015	New York Film Critics Circle	Best Actress	Brooklyn	Won	
2015	Online Film Critics Society	Best Actress	Brooklyn	Nominated	
2015	Online Film and Television Association	Best Actress	Brooklyn	Nominated	
2015	San Diego Film Critics Society	Best Actress	Brooklyn	Nominated	
2015	San Francisco Film Critics Circle	Best Actress	Brooklyn	Won	
2015	Satellite Awards	Best Actress - Motion Picture	Brooklyn	Won	
2015	Screen Actors Guild Awards	Best Actress	Brooklyn	Nominated	
2015	Southeastern Film Critics Association	Best Actress	Brooklyn	Nominated	
2015	St. Louis Gateway Film Critics Association	Best Actress	Brooklyn	Runner-up	
2015	Utah Film Critics Association	Best Actress	Brooklyn	Nominated	
2015	Vancouver Film Critics Circle	Best Actress	Brooklyn	Nominated	
2015	Washington D.C. Area Film Critics Association	Best Actress	Brooklyn	Won	
2015	Women's Image Network Awards	Best Actress	Brooklyn	Nominated	
2017	AACTA International Awards	Best Actress	Lady Bird	Nominated	
2017	Academy Awards	Best Actress	Lady Bird	Nominated	
2017	Austin Film Critics Association	Best Actress	Lady Bird	Nominated	
2017	British Academy Film Awards	Best Actress	Lady Bird	Nominated	
2017	Chicago Film Critics Association	Best Actress	Lady Bird	Won	
2017	Critics' Choice Movie Awards	Best Actress	Lady Bird	Nominated	
2017	Dallas–Fort Worth Film Critics Association	Best Actress	Lady Bird	4th Place	
2017	Denver Film Critics Society	Best Actress	Lady Bird	Won	
2017	Detroit Film Critics Society	Best Actress	Lady Bird	Nominated	
2017	Dorian Awards	Best Actress	Lady Bird	Nominated	
2017	Florida Film Critics Circle	Best Actress	Lady Bird	Nominated	
2017	Georgia Film Critics Association	Best Actress	Lady Bird	Won	
2017	Golden Globe Awards	Best Actress - Musical or Comedy	Lady Bird	Won	
2017	Gotham Independent Film Awards	Best Actress	Lady Bird	Won	
2017	Houston Film Critics Society	Best Actress	Lady Bird	Nominated	
2017	Independent Spirit Awards	Best Female Lead	Lady Bird	Nominated	
2017	Indiana Film Journalists Association	Best Actress	Lady Bird	Won	
2017	IndieWire Critics Poll	Best Actress	Lady Bird	Won	
2017	International Cinephile Society	Best Actress	Lady Bird	Nominated	
2017	Iowa Film Critics Association	Best Actress	Lady Bird	Won	
2017	National Society of Film Critics	Best Actress	Lady Bird	2nd Place	
2017	New York Film Critics Circle	Best Actress	Lady Bird	Won	
2017	Oklahoma Film Critics Circle	Best Actress	Lady Bird	Nominated	
2017	Online Film Critics Society	Best Actress	Lady Bird	Nominated	
2017	Online Film and Television Association	Best Actress	Lady Bird	Won	
2017	San Diego Film Critics Society	Best Actress	Lady Bird	Nominated	
2017	San Francisco Film Critics Circle	Best Actress	Lady Bird	Nominated	
2017	Satellite Awards	Best Actress	Lady Bird	Nominated	
2017	Screen Actors Guild Awards	Best Actress	Lady Bird	Nominated	
2017	Seattle Film Critics Society	Best Actress	Lady Bird	Won	
2017	St. Louis Gateway Film Critics Association	Best Actress	Lady Bird	Nominated	
2017	Toronto Film Critics Association	Best Actress	Lady Bird	Runner-up	
2017	Vancouver Film Critics Circle	Best Actress	Lady Bird	Won	
2017	Washington D.C. Area Film Critics Association	Best Actress	Lady Bird	Nominated	
2019	AACTA International Awards	Best Actress	Little Women	Won	
2019	Academy Awards	Best Actress	Little Women	Nominated	
2019	Alliance of Women Film Journalists	Best Actress	Little Women	Nominated	
2019	Boston Society of Film Critics	Best Actress	Little Women	Won	
2019	British Academy Film Awards	Best Actress	Little Women	Nominated	
2019	Critics' Choice Movie Awards	Best Actress	Little Women	Nominated	
2019	Dallas–Fort Worth Film Critics Association	Best Actress	Little Women	4th place	
2019	Denver Film Critics Society	Best Actress	Little Women	Nominated	
2019	Georgia Film Critics Association	Best Actress	Little Women	Nominated	
2019	Golden Globe Awards	Best Actress – Drama	Little Women	Nominated	
2019	Houston Film Critics Society	Best Actress	Little Women	Nominated	
2019	Iowa Film Critics Association	Best Actress	Little Women	Nominated	
2019	Indiana Film Journalists Association	Best Actress	Little Women	Nominated	
2019	IndieWire Critics Poll	Best Actress	Little Women	9th place	
2019	Online Film and Television Association	Best Actress	Little Women	Nominated	
2019	San Diego Film Critics Society	Best Actress	Little Women	Nominated	
2019	Seattle Film Critics Society	Best Actress	Little Women	Nominated	
2019	St. Louis Film Critics Association	Best Actress	Little Women	Nominated	
2019	Vancouver Film Critics Circle	Best Actress	Little Women	Nominated	
2019	Washington D.C. Area Film Critics Association	Best Actress	Little Women	Nominated	
