= List of accolades received by The Big Short (film) =

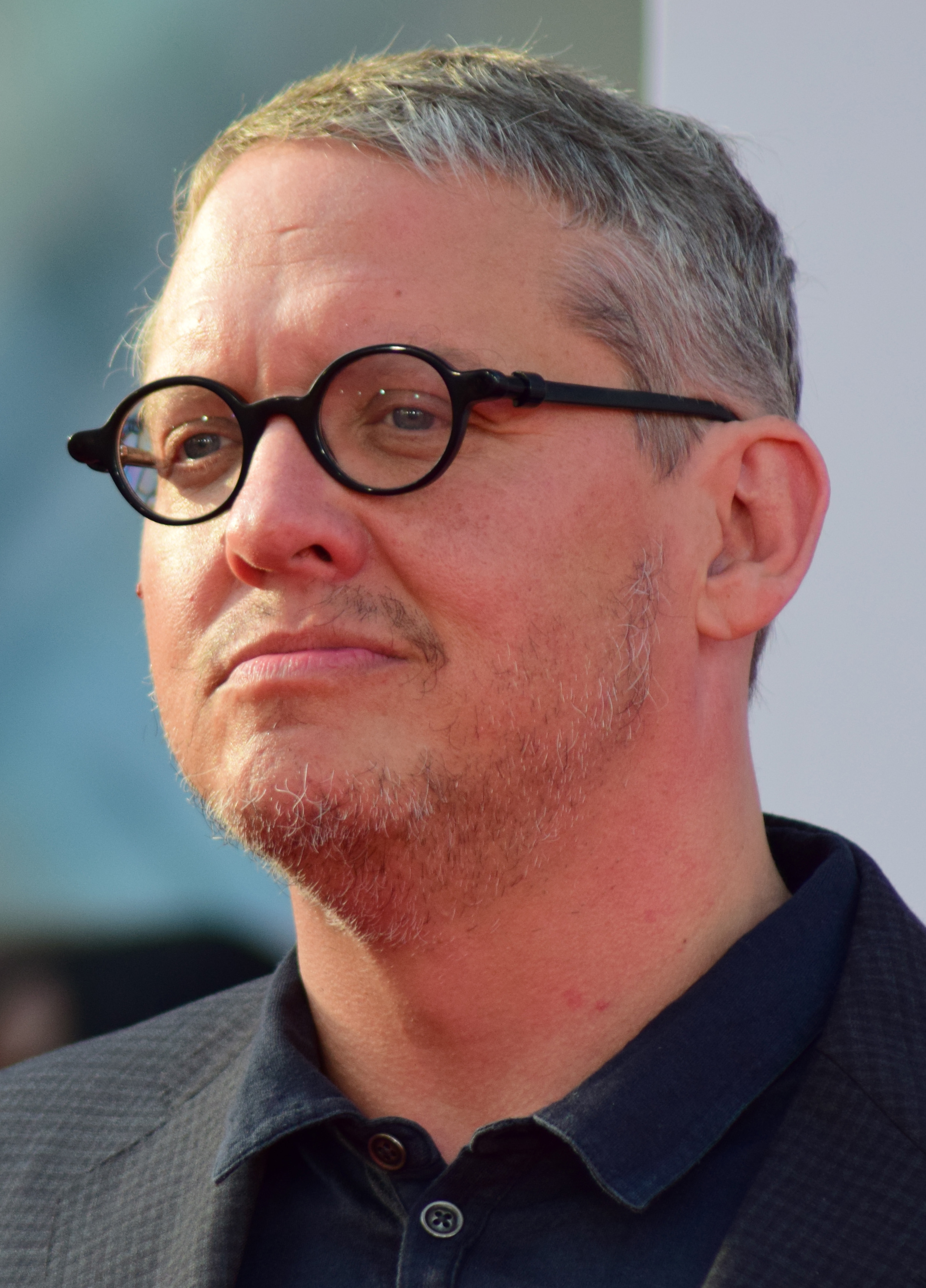
- Adam McKay received numerous accolades for his work, including the Oscar and BAFTA for co-writing the screenplay.
Accolades
Award	Wins	Nominations
AACTA Awards	0	4
Academy Awards	1	5
Alliance of Women Film Journalists	0	3
American Cinema Editors Awards	1	1
Austin Film Critics Association	1	3
Boston Society of Film Critics	1	1
British Academy Film Awards	1	5
Casting Society of America	1	1
Chicago Film Critics Association	1	3
Cinema for Peace	0	1
Critics' Choice Movie Awards	3	7
Dallas–Fort Worth Film Critics Association	1	1
Detroit Film Critics Society	0	2
Directors Guild of America Awards	0	1
Empire Awards	1	1
Florida Film Critics Circle	1	3
Georgia Film Critics Association	1	2
Golden Globe Awards	0	3
Golden Trailer Awards	0	1
Hollywood Film Awards	1	1
Houston Film Critics Society	0	1
Los Angeles Film Critics Association	1	1
Make-Up Artists and Hair Stylists Guild	0	1
MTV Movie Awards	0	1
National Board of Review	1	1
National Society of Film Critics	1	1
New York Film Critics Online	1	1
Palm Springs International Film Festival	1	1
Producers Guild of America Awards	1	1
San Diego Film Critics Society	0	1
San Francisco Film Critics Circle	0	1
Santa Barbara International Film Festival	1	2
San Diego Film Critics Society	0	1
Satellite Awards	1	2
Screen Actors Guild Awards	0	2
St. Louis Film Critics Association	0	1
Toronto Film Critics Association	1	1
USC Scripter Awards	1	1
Washington D.C. Area Film Critics Association Awards	0	1
World Soundtrack Awards	0	1
Writers Guild of America Awards	1	1

Totals (Note: Certain award groups do not simply award one winner. They acknowledge several different recipients, have runners-up, and have third place. Since this is a specific recognition and is different from losing an award, runner-up mentions are considered wins in this award tally. For simplification and to avoid errors, each award in this list has been presumed to have had a prior nomination.)
- Wins: 26
- Nominations: 73

The Big Short is a 2015 American historical comedy-drama film directed by Adam McKay and produced by Brad Pitt, Dede Gardner, Jeremy Kleiner, and Arnon Milchan. It was written by McKay and Charles Randolph. The film stars Christian Bale, Steve Carell, Ryan Gosling, and Pitt, with Melissa Leo, Hamish Linklater, John Magaro, Rafe Spall, Jeremy Strong, Finn Wittrock, and Marisa Tomei in supporting roles. Based on Michael Lewis's book of the same name, the film chronicles how events during the United States housing bubble led inadvertently to the 2008 financial crisis.

The film made its debut on the final night of the AFI Fest on November 12, 2015. Paramount Pictures initially provided the film a limited release at eleven theaters in Los Angeles, New York, San Francisco and Chicago on December 11 before expanding to over 1,500 theaters in the United States and Canada on December 23. The film grossed $133 million on a $28 million budget. Rotten Tomatoes, a review aggregator, surveyed 325 reviews and judged 88% to be positive.

The Big Short garnered awards and nominations in a variety of categories with particular praise for McKay's direction, Bale's performance as Michael Burry, and McKay and Randolph's adapted screenplay. It garnered five nominations at the 88th Academy Awards including Best Picture and Best Director for McKay. McKay and Randolph went on to win the award for Best Adapted Screenplay. At the 69th British Academy Film Awards, the film earned five nominations and won Best Adapted Screenplay for McKay and Randolph.

The film received four nominations at the 73rd Golden Globe Awards and two nominations at the 22nd Screen Actors Guild Awards. At the 27th Producers Guild of America Awards, The Big Short won for Best Theatrical Motion Picture. McKay was nominated for Outstanding Directing – Feature Film at the 68th Directors Guild of America Awards, and McKay and Randolph won Best Adapted Screenplay at the 68th Writers Guild of America Awards. It was nominated in seven categories at the 21st Critics' Choice Awards winning three for Best Adapted Screenplay, Best Comedy, and Best Actor in a Comedy. The film was named one of the Top 10 Films of 2015 by the American Film Institute.

== Awards and nominations ==
Award	Date of ceremony	Category	Recipients	Result	Ref.
AACTA Awards	January 31, 2016	Best International Film	The Big Short	Nominated	
AACTA Awards	January 31, 2016	Best International Direction	Adam McKay	Nominated	
AACTA Awards	January 31, 2016	Best Actor	Steve Carell	Nominated	
AACTA Awards	January 31, 2016	Best Supporting Actor	Christian Bale	Nominated	
Academy Awards	February 28, 2016	Best Picture	Dede Gardner, Jeremy Kleiner, and Brad Pitt	Nominated	
Academy Awards	February 28, 2016	Best Director	Adam McKay	Nominated	
Academy Awards	February 28, 2016	Best Supporting Actor	Christian Bale	Nominated	
Academy Awards	February 28, 2016	Best Adapted Screenplay	Adam McKay and Charles Randolph	Won	
Academy Awards	February 28, 2016	Best Film Editing	Hank Corwin	Nominated	
Alliance of Women Film Journalists	January 13, 2016	Best Adapted Screenplay	Adam McKay and Charles Randolph	Nominated	
Alliance of Women Film Journalists	January 13, 2016	Best Ensemble Cast	The Big Short	Nominated	
Alliance of Women Film Journalists	January 13, 2016	Best Film Editing	Hank Corwin	Nominated	
American Cinema Editors Awards	January 29, 2016	Best Edited Feature Film – Comedy or Musical	Hank Corwin	Won	
Austin Film Critics Association	December 29, 2015	Best Film	The Big Short	9th Place	
Austin Film Critics Association	December 29, 2015	Best Director	Adam McKay	Nominated	
Austin Film Critics Association	December 29, 2015	Best Adapted Screenplay	Adam McKay and Charles Randolph	Nominated	
Boston Society of Film Critics	December 6, 2015	Best Cast	The Big Short	Runner-up	
British Academy Film Awards	February 14, 2016	Best Film	Dede Gardner, Jeremy Kleiner, and Brad Pitt	Nominated	
British Academy Film Awards	February 14, 2016	Best Director	Adam McKay	Nominated	
British Academy Film Awards	February 14, 2016	Best Actor in a Supporting Role	Christian Bale	Nominated	
British Academy Film Awards	February 14, 2016	Best Adapted Screenplay	Adam McKay and Charles Randolph	Won	
British Academy Film Awards	February 14, 2016	Best Editing	Hank Corwin	Nominated	
Casting Society of America	January 21, 2016	Feature Film Big Budget Comedy	Francine Maisler and Meagan Lewis	Won	
Chicago Film Critics Association	December 16, 2015	Best Director	Adam McKay	Nominated	
Chicago Film Critics Association	December 16, 2015	Best Adapted Screenplay	Adam McKay and Charles Randolph	Won	
Chicago Film Critics Association	December 16, 2015	Best Editing	Hank Corwin	Nominated	
Cinema for Peace	February 15, 2016	Most Valuable Film of the Year	The Big Short	Nominated	
Critics' Choice Movie Awards	January 17, 2016	Best Picture	The Big Short	Nominated	
Critics' Choice Movie Awards	January 17, 2016	Best Comedy	The Big Short	Won	
Critics' Choice Movie Awards	January 17, 2016	Best Editing	Hank Corwin	Nominated	
Critics' Choice Movie Awards	January 17, 2016	Best Actor in a Comedy	Christian Bale	Won	
Critics' Choice Movie Awards	January 17, 2016	Best Actor in a Comedy	Steve Carell	Nominated	
Critics' Choice Movie Awards	January 17, 2016	Best Adapted Screenplay	Adam McKay and Charles Randolph	Won	
Critics' Choice Movie Awards	January 17, 2016	Best Acting Ensemble	The Big Short	Nominated	
Dallas–Fort Worth Film Critics Association	December 14, 2015	Top Ten Films	The Big Short	6th Place	
Detroit Film Critics Society	December 14, 2015	Best Screenplay	Adam McKay and Charles Randolph	Nominated	
Detroit Film Critics Society	December 14, 2015	Best Ensemble	The Big Short	Nominated	
Directors Guild of America Awards	February 6, 2016	Best Director	Adam McKay	Nominated	
Empire Awards	March 20, 2016	Best Screenplay	Adam McKay and Charles Randolph	Won	
Florida Film Critics Circle	December 23, 2015	Best Film	The Big Short	Nominated	
Florida Film Critics Circle	December 23, 2015	Best Screenplay	Adam McKay and Charles Randolph	Won	
Florida Film Critics Circle	December 23, 2015	Best Cast	The Big Short	Nominated	
Georgia Film Critics Association	January 8, 2016	Best Adapted Screenplay	Adam McKay and Charles Randolph	Won	
Georgia Film Critics Association	January 8, 2016	Best Ensemble	The Big Short	Nominated	
Golden Globe Awards	January 10, 2016	Best Motion Picture – Musical or Comedy	The Big Short	Nominated	
Golden Globe Awards	January 10, 2016	Best Actor – Motion Picture Musical or Comedy	Christian Bale	Nominated	
Golden Globe Awards	January 10, 2016	Best Actor – Motion Picture Musical or Comedy	Steve Carell	Nominated	
Golden Globe Awards	January 10, 2016	Best Screenplay	Adam McKay and Charles Randolph	Nominated	
Golden Trailer Awards	May 6, 2016	Best Drama TV Spot	The Big Short	Nominated	
Hollywood Film Awards	November 1, 2015	Breakthrough Director	Adam McKay	Won	
Houston Film Critics Society	January 9, 2016	Best Picture	The Big Short	Nominated	
Los Angeles Film Critics Association	December 6, 2015	Best Editing	Hank Corwin	Won	
Make–Up Artists and Hair Stylists Guild	February 20, 2016	Best Contemporary Makeup–Feature-Length Motion Picture	Julie Hewett and Pamela Westmore	Nominated	
MTV Movie Awards	April 9, 2016	True Story	The Big Short	Nominated	
National Board of Review Awards	December 1, 2015	Best Ensemble	The Big Short	Won	
National Society of Film Critics	January 3, 2016	Best Screenplay	Adam McKay and Charles Randolph	3rd Place	
New York Film Critics Online	December 6, 2015	Top Ten Films	The Big Short	Won	
Palm Springs International Film Festival	January 2, 2016	Ensemble Cast Award	The Big Short	Won	
Producers Guild of America Awards	January 23, 2016	Best Theatrical Motion Picture	Dede Gardner, Jeremy Kleiner, and Brad Pitt	Won	
San Diego Film Critics Society	December 14, 2015	Best Ensemble	The Big Short	Nominated	
San Francisco Film Critics Circle	December 12, 2015	Best Film Editing	Hank Corwin	Nominated	
Santa Barbara International Film Festival	February 3–13, 2016	Artisan Award	Hank Corwin	Nominated	
Santa Barbara International Film Festival	February 3–13, 2016	Outstanding Director of the Year	Adam McKay	Won	
Satellite Awards	February 21, 2016	Best Film	The Big Short	Nominated	
Satellite Awards	February 21, 2016	Best Supporting Actor	Christian Bale	Won	
Screen Actors Guild Awards	January 30, 2016	Outstanding Performance by a Male Actor in a Supporting Role	Christian Bale	Nominated	
Screen Actors Guild Awards	January 30, 2016	Outstanding Performance by a Cast in a Motion Picture	Christian Bale, Steve Carell, Ryan Gosling, Melissa Leo, Hamish Linklater, John Magaro, Brad Pitt, Rafe Spall, Jeremy Strong, Marisa Tomei, and Finn Wittrock	Nominated	
St. Louis Film Critics Association	December 13, 2015	Best Editing	Hank Corwin	Nominated	
Toronto Film Critics Association	December 14, 2015	Best Screenplay	Adam McKay and Charles Randolph	Won	
USC Scripter Awards	February 20, 2016	Best Adapted Screenplay	Adam McKay and Charles Randolph	Won	
Washington D.C. Area Film Critics Association Awards	December 7, 2015	Best Ensemble	The Big Short	Nominated	
World Soundtrack Awards	October 19, 2016	Discovery of the Year	Nicholas Britell	Nominated	
Writers Guild of America Awards	February 13, 2016	Best Adapted Screenplay	Adam McKay and Charles Randolph	Won	

== See also ==
- 2015 in film
