= List of accolades received by Phantom Thread =

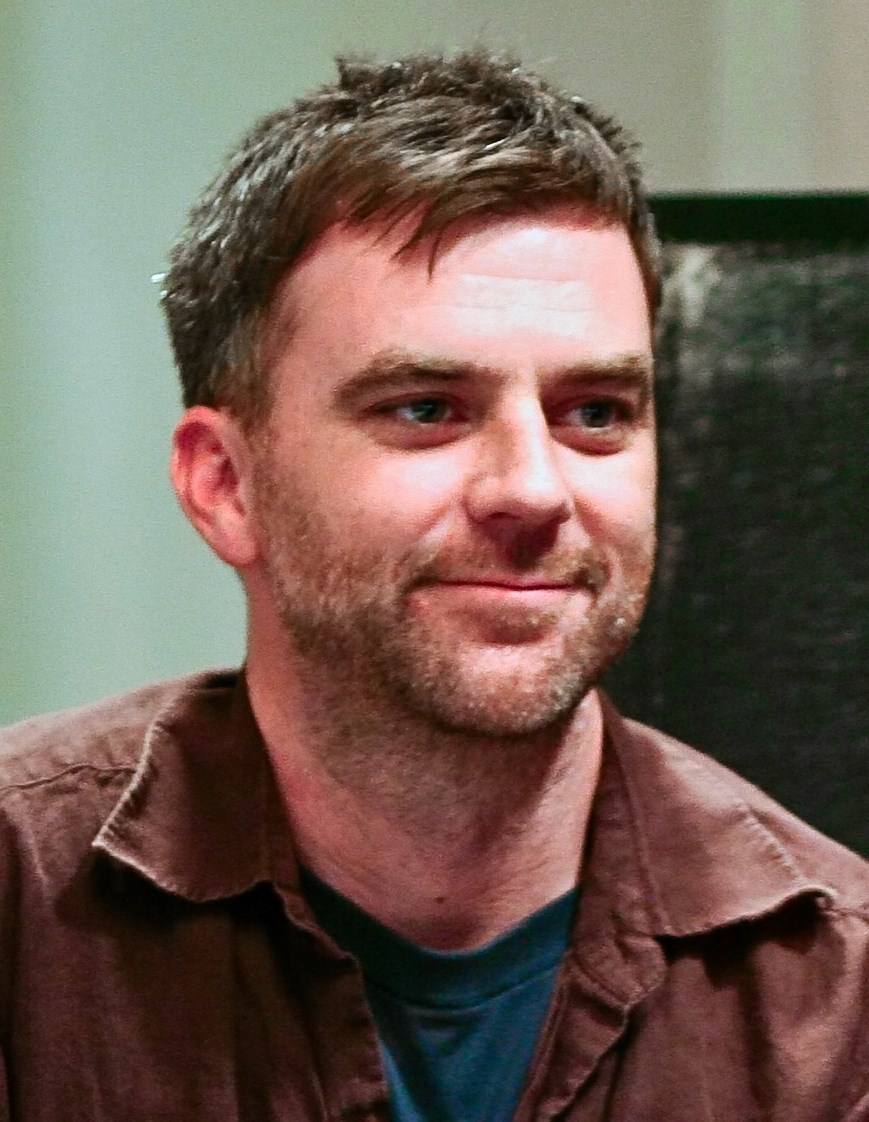
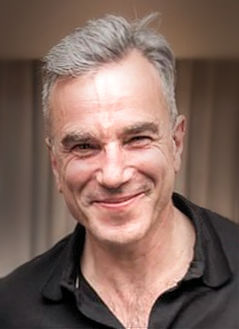
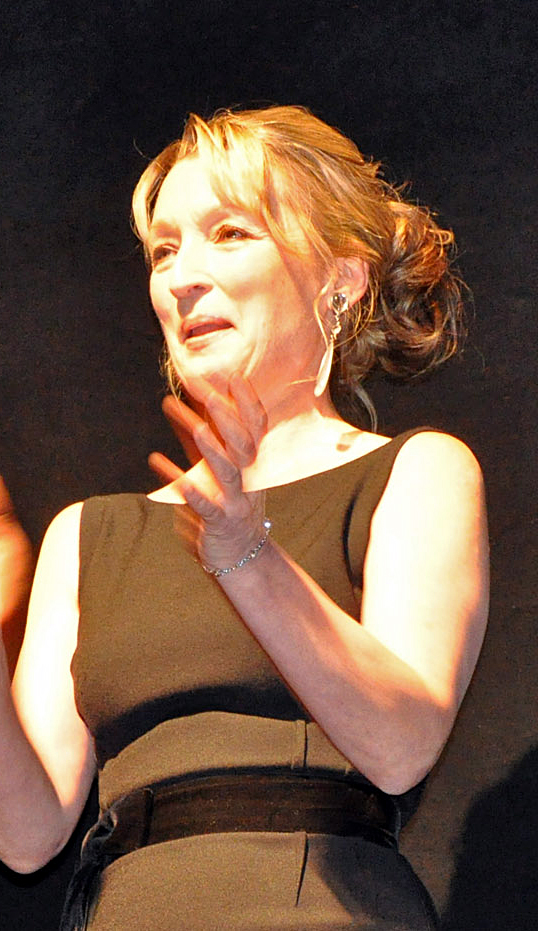
- Paul Thomas Anderson (left) received critical acclaim for his direction and screenplay, and Daniel Day-Lewis (center) and Lesley Manville (right) for their performances.
Accolades
| Award | Won | Nominated |
| AACTA International Awards | 0 | 1 |
| AARP's Movies for Grownups Awards | 0 | 2 |
| Academy Awards | 1 | 6 |
| Austin Film Critics Association | 0 | 1 |
| Boston Society of Film Critics | 3 | 3 |
| British Academy Film Awards | 1 | 4 |
| Chicago Film Critics Association | 1 | 6 |
| Costume Designers Guild | 0 | 1 |
| Critics' Choice Awards | 1 | 4 |
| Dallas-Fort Worth Film Critics Association | 0 | 1 |
| Detroit Film Critics Society | 0 | 3 |
| Florida Film Critics Circle | 0 | 2 |
| Georgia Film Critics Association | 0 | 1 |
| Golden Globe Awards | 0 | 2 |
| IndieWire Critics Poll | 1 | 7 |
| Location Managers Guild Awards | 0 | 1 |
| London Film Critics' Circle | 1 | 6 |
| Los Angeles Film Critics Association | 1 | 1 |
| National Board of Review | 2 | 2 |
| National Society of Film Critics | 0 | 5 |
| New York Film Critics Circle | 1 | 1 |
| New York Film Critics Online | 1 | 1 |
| Online Film Critics Society | 0 | 3 |
| San Diego Film Critics Society | 1 | 1 |
| San Francisco Film Critics Circle | 1 | 2 |
| Satellite Awards | 1 | 3 |
| Seattle Film Critics Society | 3 | 6 |
| St. Louis Gateway Film Critics Association | 1 | 3 |
| Toronto Film Critics Association | 1 | 1 |
| Vancouver Film Critics Circle | 2 | 4 |
| Washington D.C. Area Film Critics Association | 0 | 1 |
- Total number of awards and nominations (Note: Certain award groups do not award only one winner, as they may recognize several recipients, and include runners-up. Since this is a specific recognition and is different from losing an award, runner-up mentions are considered wins in the awards tally.) (Note: Organizations without a Wikipedia page are not included in list of accolades.)
| Totals | 24 | 85 | |
- References

Phantom Thread is a 2017 American period drama film written and directed by Paul Thomas Anderson. It is about the complex relationship between a dressmaker (played by Daniel Day-Lewis) and his muse (played by Vicky Krieps). Phantom Thread began a limited release on December 25, 2017 in the United States, before expanding wide on January 19, 2018.

On review aggregator website Rotten Tomatoes, the film has an approval rating of 91% based on 317 reviews. On Metacritic, which assigns a rating to reviews, the film has a weighted average score of 90 out of 100, based on 51 critics, indicating "universal acclaim".

Phantom Thread was praised for the performances of Day-Lewis and Lesley Manville, Anderson's direction and screenplay, Jonny Greenwood's score, and Mark Bridges' costume design. At the 90th Academy Awards, the film received six nominations; Best Picture, Best Director for Anderson, Best Actor for Day-Lewis, Best Supporting Actress for Manville, and Best Original Score for Greenwood, winning Best Costume Design for Bridges. They were the first Academy Award nominations for Manville and Greenwood. At the 23rd Critics' Choice Awards, it received four nominations, winning Best Costume Design for Bridges. The National Board of Review listed Phantom Thread as one of the top ten films of the year, and awarded Anderson the award for Best Original Screenplay.

== Accolades ==
| Award | Date of ceremony | Category | Recipient(s) | Result | Ref. |
|---|---|---|---|---|---|
| AACTA International Awards | January 5, 2018 | Best Actor | Daniel Day-Lewis | Nominated | |
| AARP's Movies for Grownups Awards | February 5, 2018 | Best Actor | Daniel Day-Lewis | Nominated | |
| AARP's Movies for Grownups Awards | February 5, 2018 | Best Supporting Actress | Lesley Manville | Nominated | |
| Academy Awards | March 4, 2018 | Best Picture | JoAnne Sellar, Paul Thomas Anderson, Megan Ellison and Daniel Lupi | Nominated | |
| Academy Awards | March 4, 2018 | Best Director | Paul Thomas Anderson | Nominated | |
| Academy Awards | March 4, 2018 | Best Actor | Daniel Day-Lewis | Nominated | |
| Academy Awards | March 4, 2018 | Best Supporting Actress | Lesley Manville | Nominated | |
| Academy Awards | March 4, 2018 | Best Costume Design | Mark Bridges | Won | |
| Academy Awards | March 4, 2018 | Best Original Score | Jonny Greenwood | Nominated | |
| Austin Film Critics Association | January 8, 2018 | Best Original Score | Jonny Greenwood | Nominated | |
| Boston Society of Film Critics | December 10, 2017 | Best Film | Phantom Thread | Won | |
| Boston Society of Film Critics | December 10, 2017 | Best Director | Paul Thomas Anderson | Won | |
| Boston Society of Film Critics | December 10, 2017 | Best Original Score | Jonny Greenwood | Won | |
| British Academy Film Awards | February 18, 2018 | Best Actor in a Leading Role | Daniel Day-Lewis | Nominated | |
| British Academy Film Awards | February 18, 2018 | Best Actress in a Supporting Role | Lesley Manville | Nominated | |
| British Academy Film Awards | February 18, 2018 | Best Film Music | Jonny Greenwood | Nominated | |
| British Academy Film Awards | February 18, 2018 | Best Costume Design | Mark Bridges | Won | |
| Chicago Film Critics Association | December 12, 2017 | Best Actor | Daniel Day-Lewis | Nominated | |
| Chicago Film Critics Association | December 12, 2017 | Best Actress | Vicky Krieps | Nominated | |
| Chicago Film Critics Association | December 12, 2017 | Best Supporting Actress | Lesley Manville | Nominated | |
| Chicago Film Critics Association | December 12, 2017 | Best Original Screenplay | Paul Thomas Anderson | Nominated | |
| Chicago Film Critics Association | December 12, 2017 | Best Art Direction | Phantom Thread | Nominated | |
| Chicago Film Critics Association | December 12, 2017 | Best Original Score | Jonny Greenwood | Won | |
| Costume Designers Guild | February 20, 2018 | Excellence in Period Film | Mark Bridges | Nominated | |
| Critics' Choice Movie Awards | January 11, 2018 | Best Actor | Daniel Day-Lewis | Nominated | |
| Critics' Choice Movie Awards | January 11, 2018 | Best Production Design | Mark Tildesley and Véronique Melery | Nominated | |
| Critics' Choice Movie Awards | January 11, 2018 | Best Costume Design | Mark Bridges | Won | |
| Critics' Choice Movie Awards | January 11, 2018 | Best Score | Jonny Greenwood | Nominated | |
| Dallas–Fort Worth Film Critics Association | December 13, 2017 | Best Actor | Daniel Day-Lewis | Runner-up | |
| Detroit Film Critics Society | December 7, 2017 | Best Director | Paul Thomas Anderson | Nominated | |
| Detroit Film Critics Society | December 7, 2017 | Best Actor | Daniel Day-Lewis | Nominated | |
| Detroit Film Critics Society | December 7, 2017 | Best Use of Music | Phantom Thread | Nominated | |
| Florida Film Critics Circle | December 23, 2017 | Best Art Direction and Production Design | Phantom Thread | Nominated | |
| Florida Film Critics Circle | December 23, 2017 | Best Score | Jonny Greenwood | Nominated | |
| Georgia Film Critics Association | January 12, 2018 | Best Original Score | Jonny Greenwood | Nominated | |
| Golden Globe Awards | January 7, 2018 | Best Actor in a Motion Picture – Drama | Daniel Day-Lewis | Nominated | |
| Golden Globe Awards | January 7, 2018 | Best Original Score | Jonny Greenwood | Nominated | |
| IndieWire Critics Poll | December 19, 2016 | Most Anticipated of 2017 | Phantom Thread | 4th place | |
| IndieWire Critics Poll | December 19, 2017 | Best Picture | Phantom Thread | 4th place | |
| IndieWire Critics Poll | December 19, 2017 | Best Director | Paul Thomas Anderson | Won | |
| IndieWire Critics Poll | December 19, 2017 | Best Actor | Daniel Day-Lewis | 2nd Place | |
| IndieWire Critics Poll | December 19, 2017 | Best Supporting Actress | Lesley Manville | 4th place | |
| IndieWire Critics Poll | December 19, 2017 | Best Screenplay | Paul Thomas Anderson | 3rd Place | |
| IndieWire Critics Poll | December 19, 2017 | Best Cinematography | Paul Thomas Anderson | 3rd Place | |
| Location Managers Guild Awards | April 2018 | Outstanding Locations in Period Film | Jason Wheeler | Nominated | |
| London Film Critics' Circle | January 28, 2018 | Best Film | Phantom Thread | Nominated | |
| London Film Critics' Circle | January 28, 2018 | Best Actor | Daniel Day-Lewis | Nominated | |
| London Film Critics' Circle | January 28, 2018 | Best Supporting Actress | Lesley Manville | Won | |
| London Film Critics' Circle | January 28, 2018 | Best Screenwriter | Paul Thomas Anderson | Nominated | |
| London Film Critics' Circle | January 28, 2018 | Best British/Irish Actor | Daniel Day-Lewis | Nominated | |
| London Film Critics' Circle | January 28, 2018 | Technical Achievement Award | Mark Bridges | Nominated | |
| Los Angeles Film Critics Association | December 3, 2017 | Best Music | Jonny Greenwood | Won | |
| National Board of Review | January 9, 2018 | Best Original Screenplay | Paul Thomas Anderson | Won | |
| National Board of Review | January 9, 2018 | Top Ten Films | Phantom Thread | Won | |
| National Society of Film Critics | January 6, 2018 | Best Film | Phantom Thread | 3rd Place | |
| National Society of Film Critics | January 6, 2018 | Best Director | Paul Thomas Anderson | 2nd Place | |
| National Society of Film Critics | January 6, 2018 | Best Actor | Daniel Day-Lewis | 2nd Place | |
| National Society of Film Critics | January 6, 2018 | Best Supporting Actress | Lesley Manville | 2nd Place | |
| National Society of Film Critics | January 6, 2018 | Best Screenplay | Paul Thomas Anderson | 3rd Place | |
| New York Film Critics Circle | January 3, 2018 | Best Screenplay | Paul Thomas Anderson | Won | |
| New York Film Critics Online | December 10, 2017 | Top Ten Films | Phantom Thread | Won | |
| Online Film Critics Society | December 28, 2017 | Best Picture | Phantom Thread | Nominated | |
| Online Film Critics Society | December 28, 2017 | Best Director | Paul Thomas Anderson | Nominated | |
| Online Film Critics Society | December 28, 2017 | Best Original Screenplay | Paul Thomas Anderson | Nominated | |
| San Diego Film Critics Society | December 11, 2017 | Best Costume Design | Mark Bridges | Won (Note: Tied with Jacqueline Durran for Beauty and the Beast.) | |
| San Francisco Film Critics Circle Awards | December 10, 2017 | Best Production Design | Mark Tildesley | Nominated | |
| San Francisco Film Critics Circle Awards | December 10, 2017 | Best Original Score | Jonny Greenwood | Won | |
| Satellite Awards | February 10, 2018 | Best Actor | Daniel Day-Lewis | Nominated | |
| Satellite Awards | February 10, 2018 | Best Art Direction and Production Design | Mark Tildesley | Nominated | |
| Satellite Awards | February 10, 2018 | Best Costume Design | Mark Bridges | Won | |
| Seattle Film Critics Society | December 18, 2017 | Best Picture of the Year | Phantom Thread | Nominated | |
| Seattle Film Critics Society | December 18, 2017 | Best Actor | Daniel Day-Lewis | Won | |
| Seattle Film Critics Society | December 18, 2017 | Best Supporting Actress | Lesley Manville | Nominated | |
| Seattle Film Critics Society | December 18, 2017 | Best Costume Design | Mark Bridges | Won | |
| Seattle Film Critics Society | December 18, 2017 | Best Original Score | Jonny Greenwood | Won | |
| Seattle Film Critics Society | December 18, 2017 | Best Production Design | Mark Tildesley and Véronique Melery | Nominated | |
| St. Louis Film Critics Association | December 17, 2017 | Best Actor | Daniel Day-Lewis | Nominated | |
| St. Louis Film Critics Association | December 17, 2017 | Best Production Design | Mark Tildesley | Nominated | |
| St. Louis Film Critics Association | December 17, 2017 | Best Original Score | Jonny Greenwood | Won | |
| Toronto Film Critics Association | December 10, 2017 | Best Actor | Daniel Day-Lewis | Won | |
| Vancouver Film Critics Circle | January 6, 2018 | Best Film | Phantom Thread | Nominated | |
| Vancouver Film Critics Circle | January 6, 2018 | Best Director | Paul Thomas Anderson | Won | |
| Vancouver Film Critics Circle | January 6, 2018 | Best Actor | Daniel Day-Lewis | Won | |
| Vancouver Film Critics Circle | January 6, 2018 | Best Supporting Actress | Lesley Manville | Nominated | |
| Washington D.C. Area Film Critics Association | December 8, 2017 | Best Actor | Daniel Day-Lewis | Nominated | |
