= 2017 National Society of Film Critics Awards =

Annual US film awards ceremony

52nd NSFC Awards

January 6, 2018

Best Film:
Lady Bird

The 52nd National Society of Film Critics Awards, given on 6 January 2018, honored the best in film for 2017.

== Winners ==
Winners are listed in boldface along with the runner-up positions and counts from the final round:

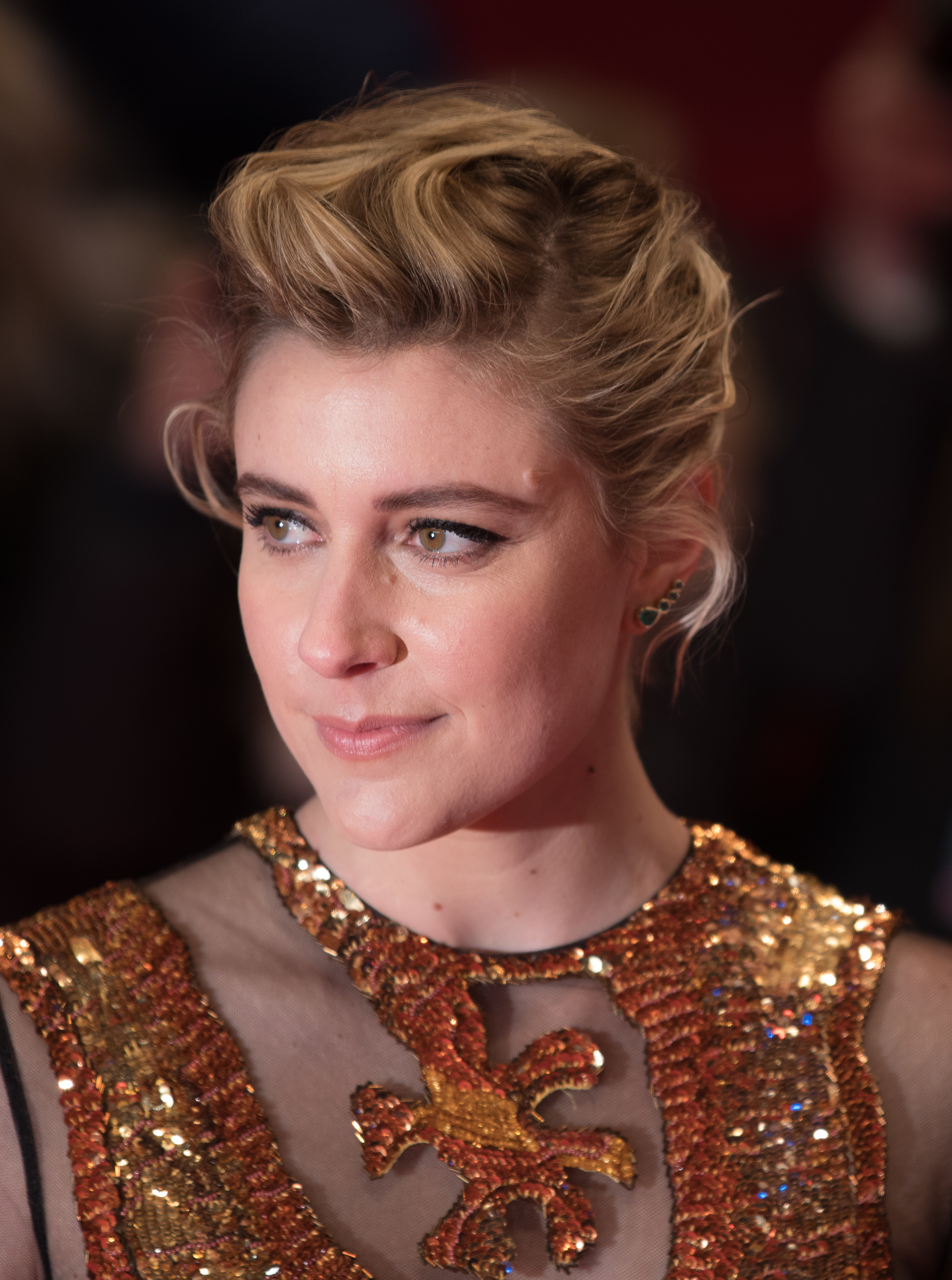
Greta Gerwig, Best Director and Best Screenplay winner

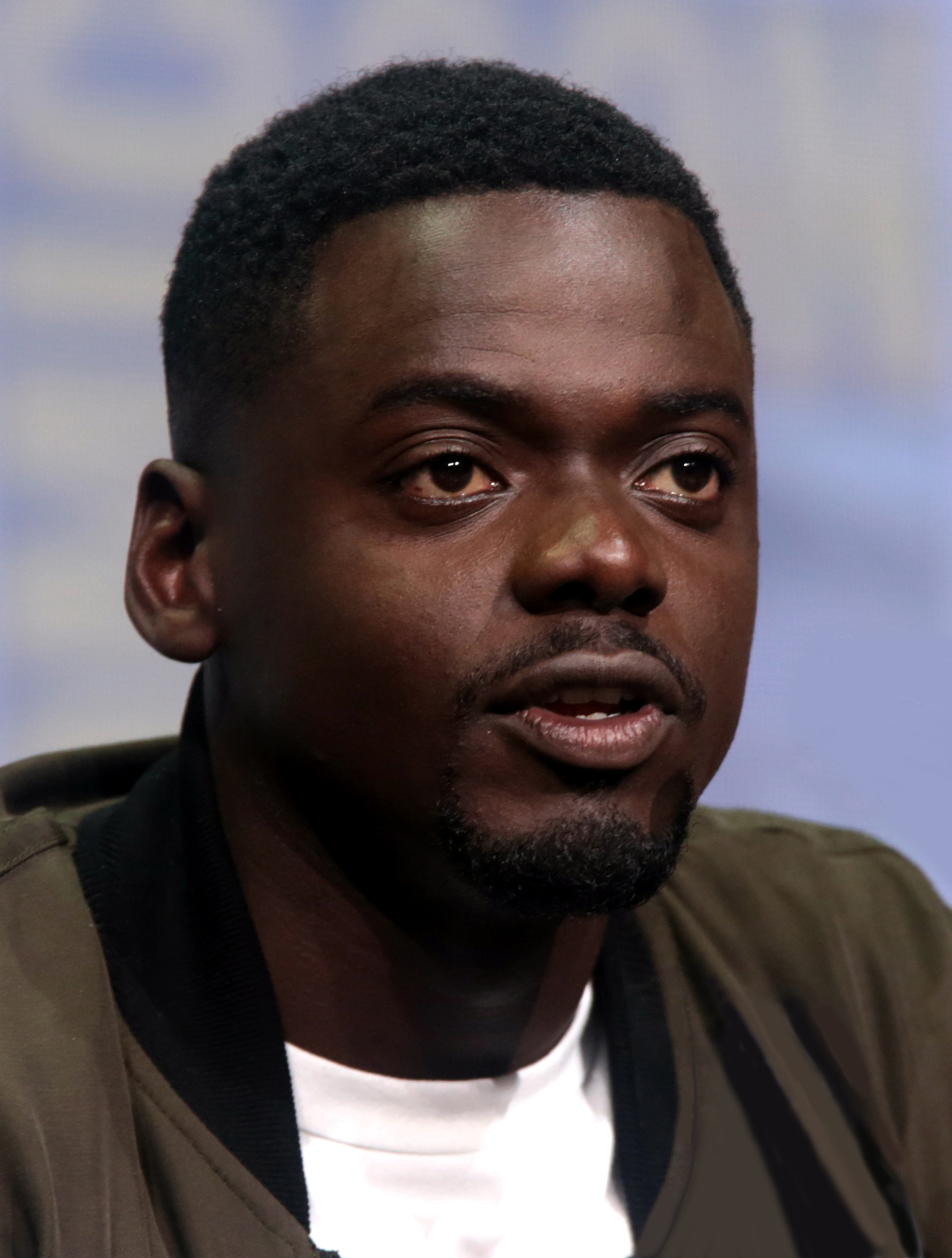
Daniel Kaluuya, Best Actor winner

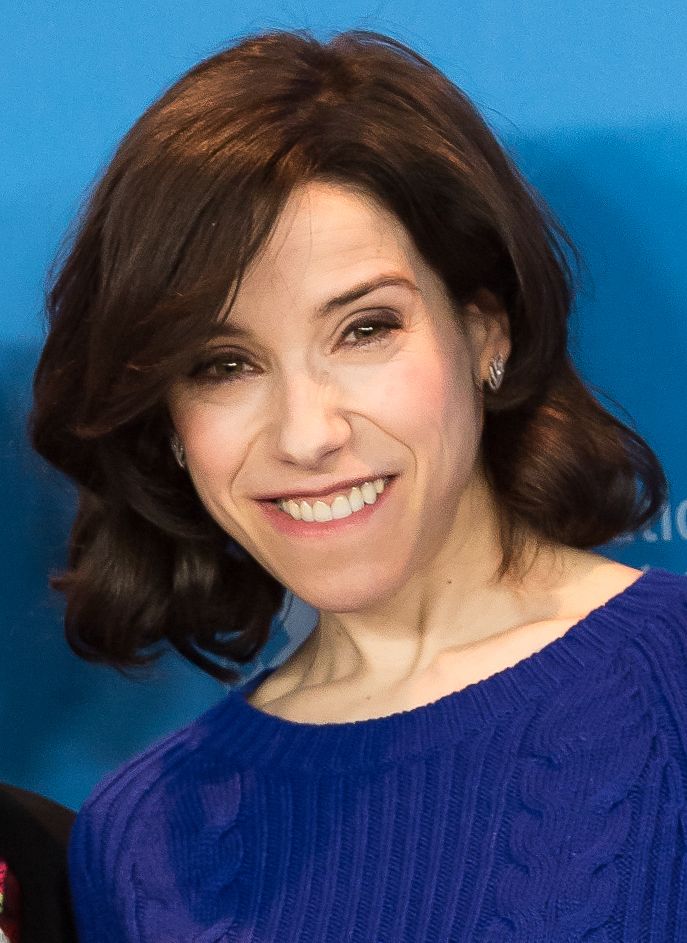
Sally Hawkins, Best Actress winner

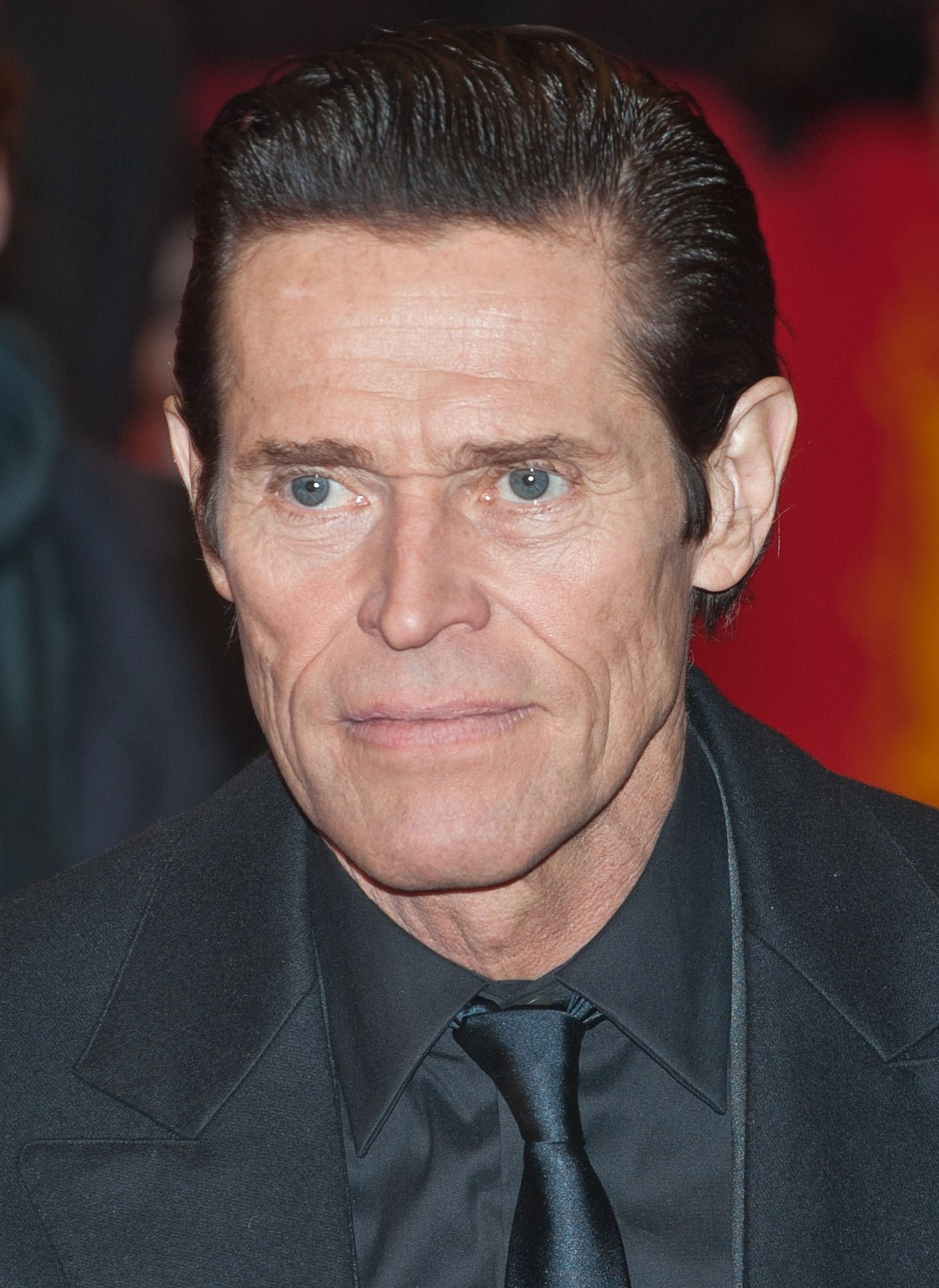
Willem Dafoe, Best Supporting Actor winner

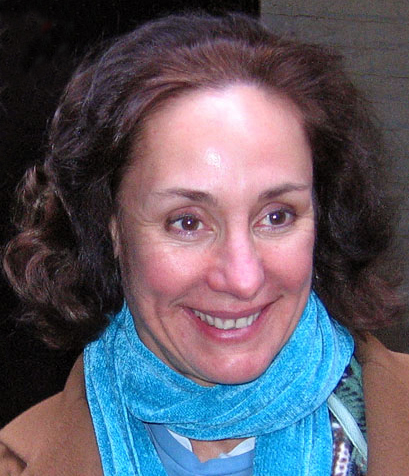
Laurie Metcalf, Best Supporting Actress winner

=== Best Picture ===
1. **Lady Bird** (41)
2. Get Out (39)
3. Phantom Thread (28)

=== Best Director ===
1. **Greta Gerwig – Lady Bird** (37)
2. Jordan Peele – Get Out / Paul Thomas Anderson – Phantom Thread (36)

=== Best Actor ===
1. **Daniel Kaluuya – Get Out** (44)
2. Daniel Day-Lewis – Phantom Thread (34)
3. Timothée Chalamet – Call Me by Your Name (24)

=== Best Actress ===
1. **Sally Hawkins – The Shape of Water and Maudie** (49)
2. Saoirse Ronan – Lady Bird (44)
3. Frances McDormand – Three Billboards Outside Ebbing, Missouri / Cynthia Nixon – A Quiet Passion (24)

=== Best Supporting Actor ===
1. **Willem Dafoe – The Florida Project** (62)
2. Michael Stuhlbarg – Call Me by Your Name, The Shape of Water, and The Post (25)
3. Sam Rockwell – Three Billboards Outside Ebbing, Missouri (23)

=== Best Supporting Actress ===
1. **Laurie Metcalf – Lady Bird** (74)
2. Lesley Manville – Phantom Thread (36)
3. Allison Janney – I, Tonya (24)

=== Best Screenplay ===
1. **Greta Gerwig – Lady Bird** (50)
2. Jordan Peele – Get Out (49)
3. Paul Thomas Anderson – Phantom Thread (31)

=== Best Cinematography ===
1. **Roger Deakins – Blade Runner 2049** (40)
2. Hoyte van Hoytema – Dunkirk (39)
3. Alexis Zabé – The Florida Project (36)

=== Best Foreign Language Film ===
1. **Graduation – Cristian Mungiu** (35)
2. Faces Places – Agnès Varda (30)
3. BPM (Beats per Minute) – Robin Campillo (29)

=== Best Non-Fiction Film ===
1. **Faces Places – Agnès Varda** (70)
2. Ex Libris: The New York Public Library – Frederick Wiseman (34)
3. Dawson City: Frozen Time – Bill Morrison (32)

=== Film Heritage Award ===
- One Way or Another: Black Women's Cinema, 1970–1991, curated by the Brooklyn Academy of Music Cinématek.
- Special commendation to Dan Talbot for his pioneering work as an exhibitor and distributor, in bringing worldwide cinema to the United States.

=== Special Citation ===
- Agnieszka Holland's Spoor, a film awaiting American distribution

== Dedication ==
This year's National Society of Film Critics awards are dedicated to Richard Schickel, the legendary film critic and historian, author of 37 books and director of 37 documentaries, and a founding member of the Society, who died on February 18, 2017.
