= Austin Film Critics Association Awards 2015 =

Annual US film awards ceremony

11th AFCA Awards

Best Film:
Mad Max: Fury Road

The 11th Austin Film Critics Association Awards, honoring the best in filmmaking for 2015, were announced on December 29, 2015.

== Winners and nominees ==
Best Film	Best Director
1. Mad Max: Fury Road; 2. Spotlight; 3. Carol; 4. Anomalisa; 5. Room; 6. Ex Machina; 7. Inside Out; 8. Creed; 9. The Big Short; 10. Sicario	George Miller – Mad Max: Fury Road; Todd Haynes – Carol; Tom McCarthy – Spotlight; Adam McKay – The Big Short; Quentin Tarantino – The Hateful Eight
Best Actor	Best Actress
Michael Fassbender – Steve Jobs; Bryan Cranston – Trumbo; Leonardo DiCaprio – The Revenant; Michael B. Jordan – Creed; Jacob Tremblay – Room	Brie Larson – Room; Cate Blanchett – Carol; Rooney Mara – Carol; Saoirse Ronan – Brooklyn; Charlize Theron – Mad Max: Fury Road
Best Supporting Actor	Best Supporting Actress
Sylvester Stallone – Creed; Benicio del Toro – Sicario; Idris Elba – Beasts of No Nation; Oscar Isaac – Ex Machina; Michael Shannon – 99 Homes	Alicia Vikander – Ex Machina; Elizabeth Banks – Love and Mercy; Jennifer Jason Leigh – The Hateful Eight; Kristen Stewart – Clouds of Sils Maria; Kate Winslet – Steve Jobs
Best Original Screenplay	Best Adapted Screenplay
Inside Out – Pete Docter, Meg LeFauve, and Josh Cooley; Ex Machina – Alex Garland; The Hateful Eight – Quentin Tarantino; Sicario – Taylor Sheridan; Spotlight – Tom McCarthy and Josh Singer	Room – Emma Donoghue; Anomalisa – Charlie Kaufman; The Big Short – Charles Randolph and Adam McKay; Carol – Phyllis Nagy; Steve Jobs – Aaron Sorkin
Best Animated Film	Best Foreign Language Film
Inside Out; Anomalisa; The Good Dinosaur; The Peanuts Movie; Shaun the Sheep Movie	Son of Saul; Mustang; Phoenix; The Tribe; Victoria
Best First Film	Best Documentary
Ex Machina; Bone Tomahawk; The Diary of a Teenage Girl; Mustang; Son of Saul	The Look of Silence; Amy; Best of Enemies; Cartel Land; Where to Invade Next
Best Cinematography	Best Score
Carol – Edward Lachman; The Hateful Eight – Robert Richardson; Mad Max: Fury Road – John Seale; The Revenant – Emmanuel Lubezki; Sicario – Roger Deakins	The Hateful Eight – Ennio Morricone; Carol – Carter Burwell; Inside Out – Michael Giacchino; It Follows – Disasterpeace; Mad Max: Fury Road – Junkie XL
Bobby McCurdy Memorial Breakthrough Artist Award	Austin Film Award
Jacob Tremblay – Room; Abraham Attah – Beasts of No Nation; Amy Schumer – Trainwreck; Mya Taylor – Tangerine; Alicia Vikander – Ex Machina	Kumiko, the Treasure Hunter – David Zellner; Arlo and Julie – Steve Mims; A Brave Heart: The Lizzie Velasquez Story – Sara Hirsh Bordo; Peace Officer – Brad Barber and Scott Christopherson; Two Step – Alex R. Johnson
Special Honorary Award
Don Hertzfeldt, in celebration of a career of remarkable short filmmaking and contributions to animation spanning two decades, with 2015's award-winning World of Tomorrow being recognized as his best work to date
