= Faces Places (film) =

2017 French documentary film

- Theatrical release poster
- Directed by: Agnès Varda; JR
- Written by: Agnès Varda; JR
- Produced by: Rosalie Varda
- Starring: Agnès Varda; JR
- Cinematography: Claire Duguet; Nicolas Guicheteau; Valentin Vignet; Romain Le Bonniec; Raphaël Minnesota; Roberto De Angelis; Julia Fabry
- Edited by: Agnès Varda; Maxime Pozzi Garcia
- Music by: Matthieu Chedid
- Production companies: Ciné Tamaris; Social Animals; Rouge International; Arte France Cinéma; Arches Films
- Distributed by: Le Pacte
- Release dates: 19 May 2017 (Cannes); 28 June 2017 (France)
- Running time: 93 minutes
- Country: France
- Language: French
- Budget: $1 million
- Box office: $4 million

Faces Places (French: Visages Villages) is a 2017 French documentary film directed by filmmaker Agnès Varda and artist JR. The film documents the duo as they journey through rural France, capturing the portraits of the people they meet along the way. Their collaborative process leads them to create large-scale portraits, which are then displayed on buildings and other public spaces, leaving a profound impact on both the subjects and the communities they visit.

The film was screened out of competition at the 2017 Cannes Film Festival, where it earned critical acclaim and won the L'Œil d'or award, which is given for the best documentary. It was officially released in France on 28 June 2017, and later in the United States on 6 October 2017.

At the 90th Academy Awards, Faces Places was nominated for Best Documentary Feature. Notably, it was Agnès Varda's second-to-last cinematic work before her death. It was followed by the two-episode 2019 documentary series, Varda by Agnès, which offers a retrospective look at her career.

The film is an exploration of art, human connection, and the power of shared experiences, bridging generational and cultural gaps through the simple act of portraiture.

== Synopsis ==
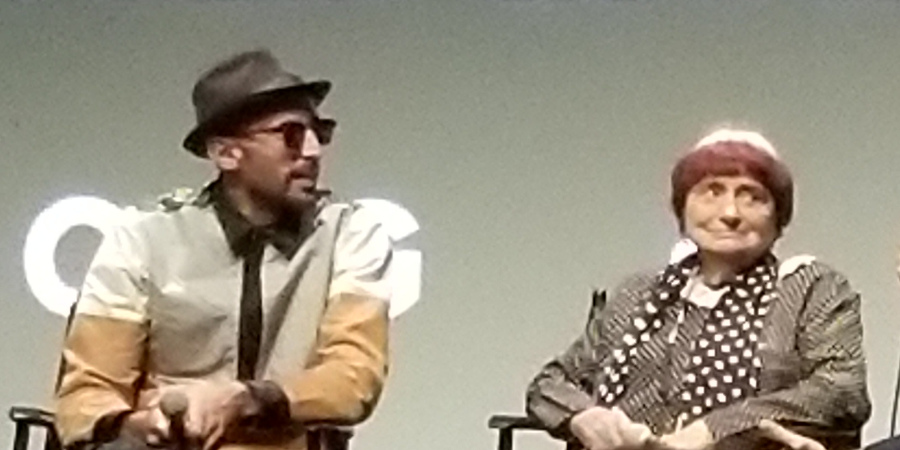
JR (left) and Agnès Varda (right) in 2017

Varda and JR, who is 55 years Varda's junior, visit villages, small towns, and factories throughout France to meet communities of people and create large portraits of them to plaster on walls and structures. Over the course of their travels, the two artists get to know each other and become friends.

Varda refers more than once to Les fiancés du pont MacDonald, a short film she made in 1961 about a young man, played by Jean-Luc Godard, who sees the world through dark glasses. She notes the resemblance between Godard, who frequently even wore sunglasses inside, and JR, whose public image also includes wearing sunglasses. Eventually, Varda and JR travel to Switzerland so she can introduce him to Godard. When they arrive at Godard's house, however, he rudely refuses to see them, bringing Varda to tears. To soothe her, JR shows her his face unobscured, but, since she is losing her sight, we only see him blurred.

== Reception and accolades ==
=== Critical reception ===
Faces Places received widespread acclaim from critics. On the review aggregator website Rotten Tomatoes, 99% of 144 critics' reviews of the film are positive, with an average rating of 8.8/10; the site's "critics consensus" reads: "Equal parts breezily charming and poignantly powerful, Faces Places is a unique cross-generational portrait of life in rural France from the great Agnès Varda." On Metacritic, the film has a weighted average score of 94 out of 100 based on reviews from 22 critics, indicating "universal acclaim".

Amy Taubin of Film Comment called the film an "unassuming masterpiece" that is "both personal and populist, a celebration of artisanal production (including cinema), worker solidarity, and the photographic arts in the face of mortality." Film critic Imma Merino wrote that it is "a road movie through rural France in which the protagonism is yielded to homes and anonymous women that the filmmaker turns into giants. It is also an X-ray of the way to understand life".

In July 2025, it ranked number 23 on Rolling Stone's list of "The 100 Best Movies of the 21st Century".

=== Awards and accolades ===
The film won the Grolsch People's Choice Documentary Award at the 2017 Toronto International Film Festival, and the Most Popular International Documentary Award at the 2017 Vancouver International Film Festival. It also won the award for Best Non-Fiction Film at the 2017 New York Film Critics Circle Awards, and the award for Best Documentary Feature at the 33rd Independent Spirit Awards. Time magazine selected the film as one of the top ten films of 2017.

At the 90th Academy Awards, the film was nominated for Best Documentary Feature. It was nominated for Best Documentary and Best Original Music at the 43rd César Awards.
