= 19th Hollywood Film Awards =

US film awards ceremony in 2015

- Location: Santa Monica, California
- Founded: 1997
- Festival date: November 1, 2015
- Website: www.hollywoodawards.com

The 19th Hollywood Film Awards were held on November 1, 2015. The ceremony took place at The Beverly Hilton Hotel in Santa Monica, California.

== Winners ==
- Hollywood Career Achievement Award: Robert De Niro
- Hollywood Producer Award: Ridley Scott – The Martian
- Hollywood Director Award: Tom Hooper – The Danish Girl
- Hollywood Actor Award: Will Smith – Concussion
- Hollywood Actress Award: Carey Mulligan – Suffragette
- Hollywood Supporting Actor Award: Benicio del Toro – Sicario
- Hollywood Supporting Actress Award: Jane Fonda – Youth
- Hollywood Breakout Actor Award: Joel Edgerton – Black Mass
- Hollywood Breakout Actress Award: Alicia Vikander – The Danish Girl
- New Hollywood Award: Saoirse Ronan – Brooklyn
- Hollywood Ensemble Award: Cast of The Hateful Eight
- Hollywood Breakout Ensemble Award: Corey Hawkins, O'Shea Jackson Jr. & Jason Mitchell Straight Outta Compton
- Hollywood Comedy Award: Amy Schumer - Trainwreck
- Hollywood Breakthrough Director Award: Adam McKay - The Big Short
- Hollywood Screenwriter Award: Tom McCarthy and Josh Singer – Spotlight
- Hollywood Blockbuster Award: Furious 7
- Hollywood Song Award: Wiz Khalifa and Charlie Puth – "See You Again" from Furious 7
- Hollywood Documentary Award: Asif Kapadia – Amy
- Hollywood Animation Award: Pete Docter – Inside Out
- Hollywood Cinematography Award: Janusz Kaminski – Bridge of Spies
- Hollywood Film Composer Award: Alexandre Desplat - The Danish Girl and Suffragette
- Hollywood Editor Award: David Rosenbloom - Black Mass
- Hollywood Visual Effects Award: Tim Alexander – Jurassic World
- Hollywood Sound Award: Gary Rydstrom – Bridge of Spies
- Hollywood Costume Design Award: Sandy Powell – Cinderella
- Hollywood Production Design Award: Colin Gibson – Mad Max: Fury Road
- Hollywood Make-Up & Hair Styling Award: Lesley Vanderwalt – Mad Max: Fury Road
