= Boston Society of Film Critics Awards 2015 =

Annual US film awards ceremony

36th BSFC Awards

December 11, 2015

Best Film:
Spotlight

The 36th Boston Society of Film Critics Awards, honoring the best in filmmaking in 2015, were given on December 11, 2015.

== Winners ==
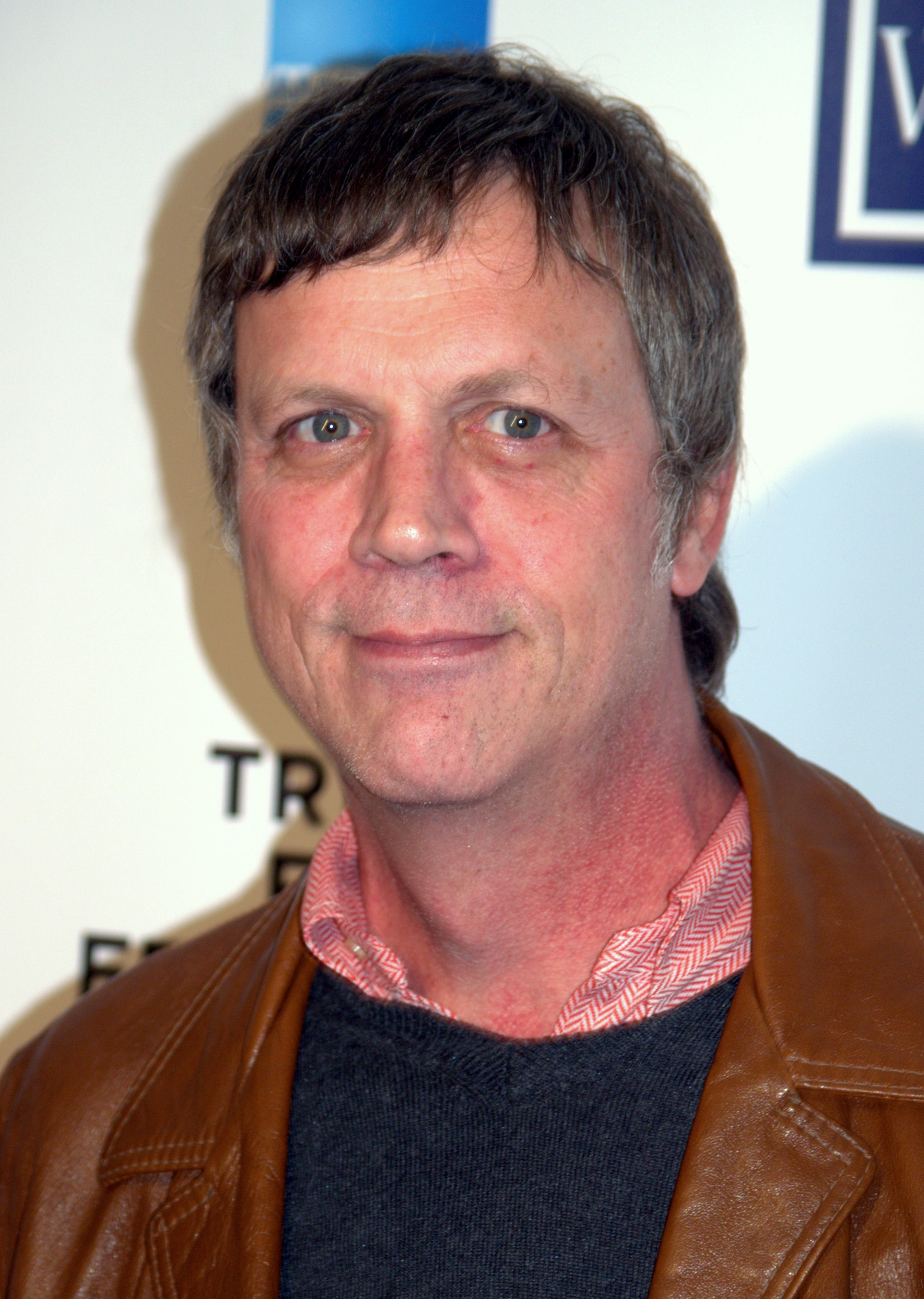
Todd Haynes, Best Director winner

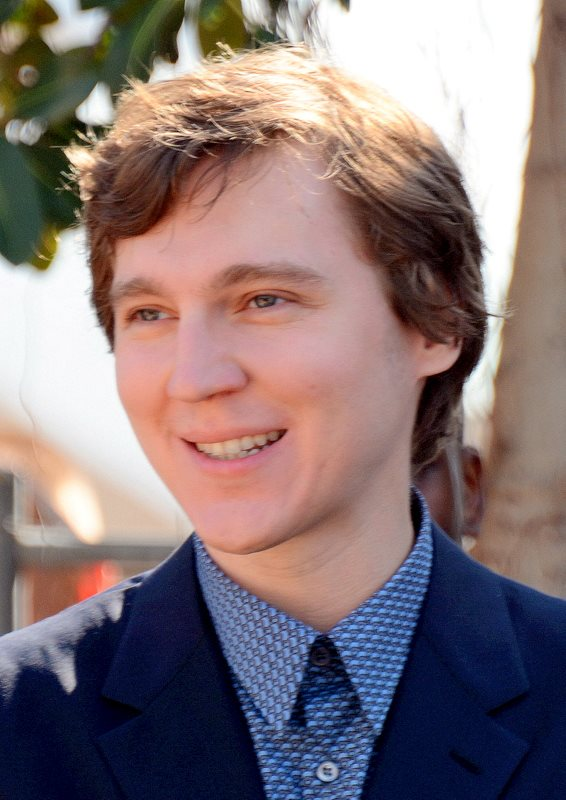
Paul Dano, Best Actor co-winner

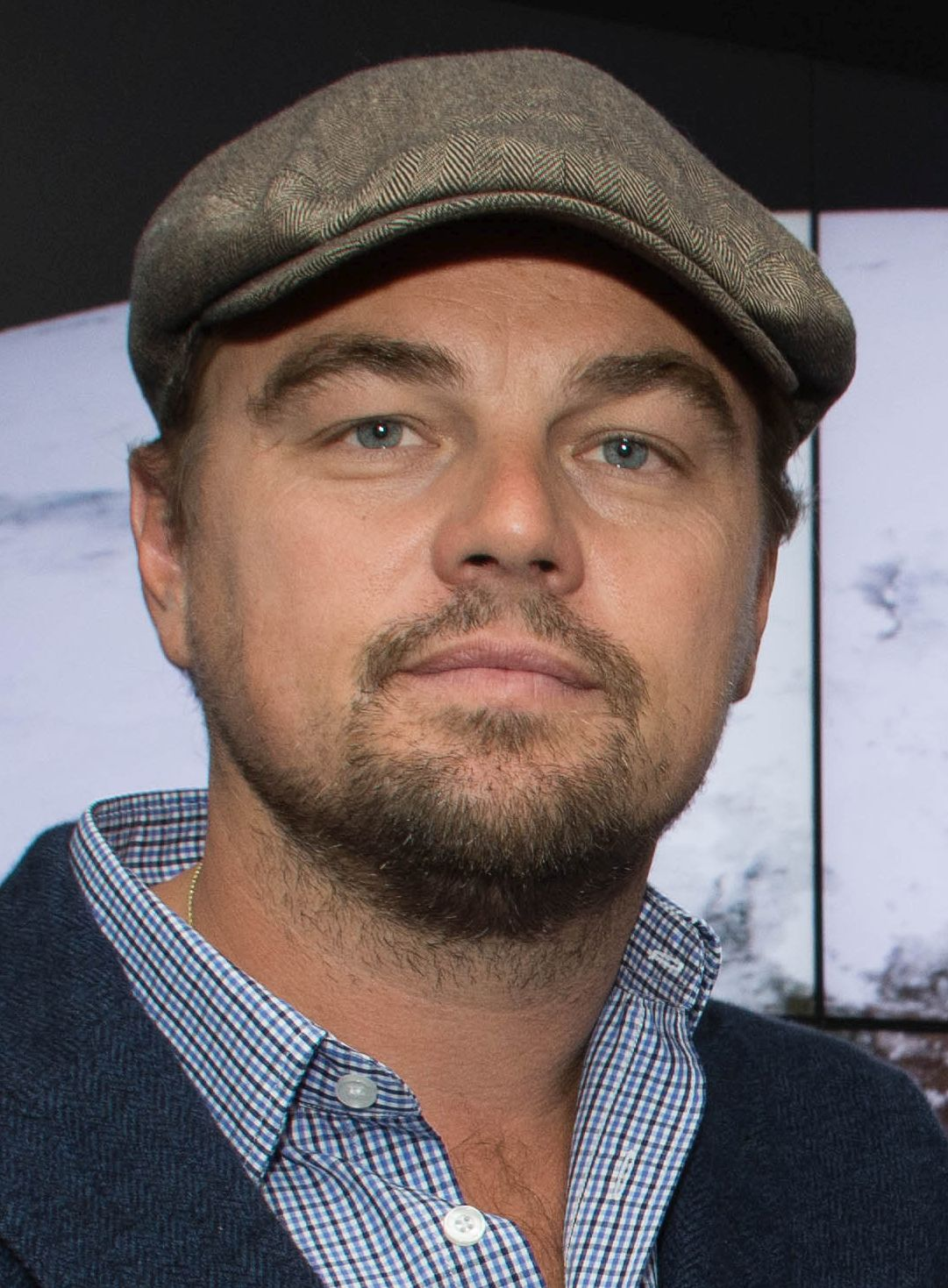
Leonardo DiCaprio, Best Actor co-winner

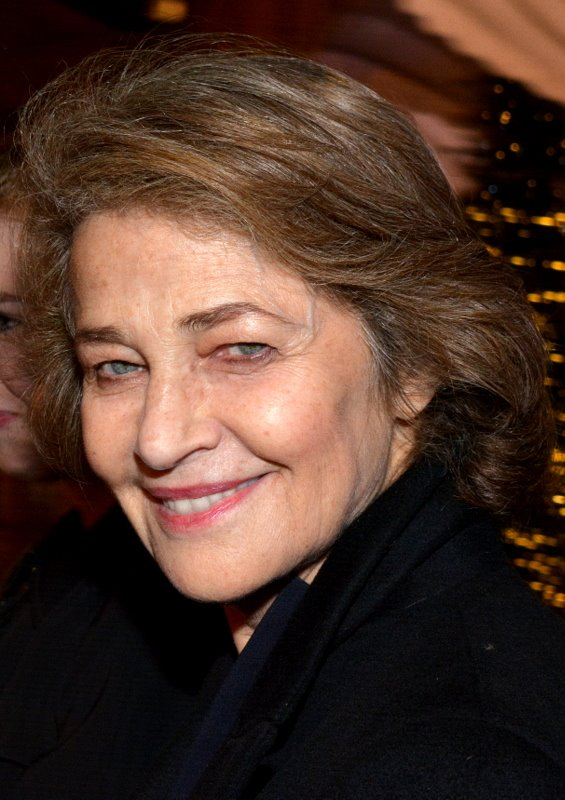
Charlotte Rampling, Best Actress winner

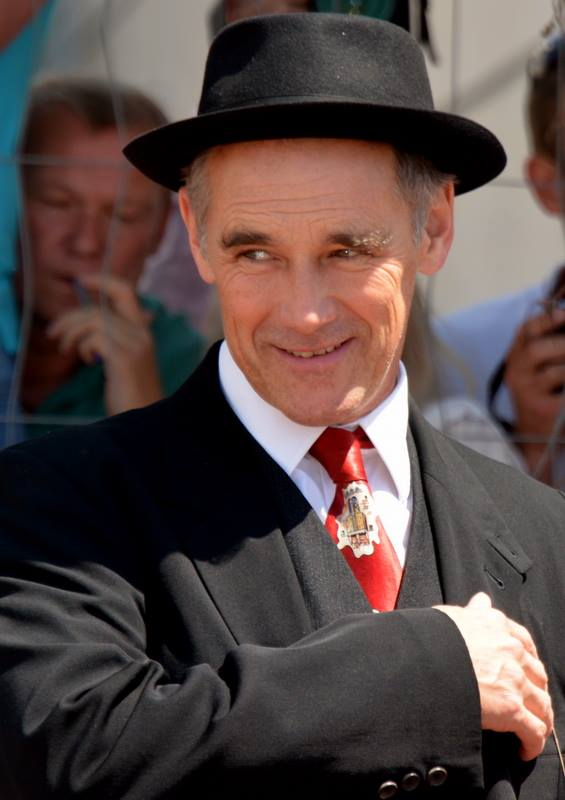
Mark Rylance, Best Supporting Actor winner

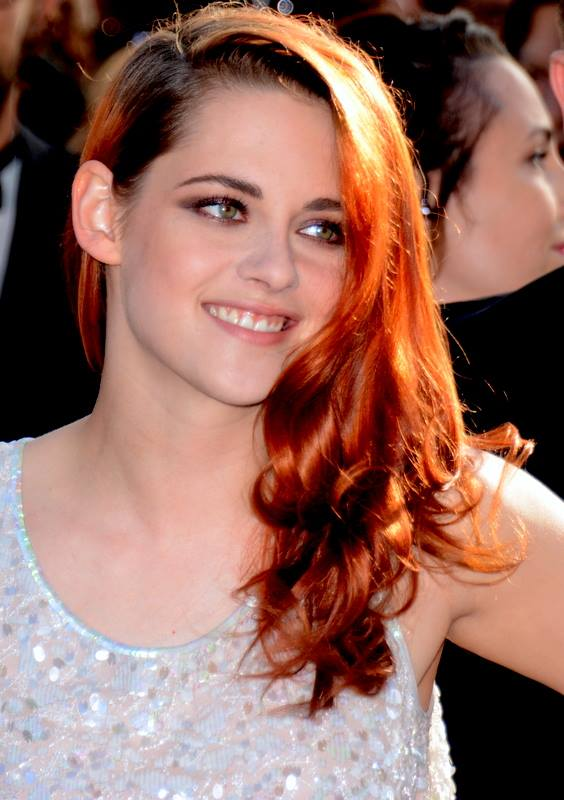
Kristen Stewart, Best Supporting Actress winner

- Best Film:
  - Spotlight
  - Runner-up: Mad Max: Fury Road
- Best Director:
  - Todd Haynes – Carol
  - Runner-up: Tom McCarthy – Spotlight
- Best Actor:
  - Paul Dano – Love & Mercy (TIE)
  - Leonardo DiCaprio – The Revenant (TIE)
- Best Actress:
  - Charlotte Rampling – 45 Years
  - Runner-up: Saoirse Ronan – Brooklyn
- Best Supporting Actor:
  - Mark Rylance – Bridge of Spies
  - Runner-up: Sylvester Stallone – Creed
- Best Supporting Actress:
  - Kristen Stewart – Clouds of Sils Maria
  - Runner-up: Alicia Vikander – The Danish Girl
- Best Screenplay:
  - Tom McCarthy and Josh Singer – Spotlight
  - Runner-up: Phyllis Nagy – Carol
- Best Original Score:
  - Atticus Ross – Love & Mercy
  - Runner-up: Ludwig Göransson – Creed
- Best Animated Film:
  - Pete Docter – Inside Out (TIE)
  - Charlie Kaufman and Duke Johnson – Anomalisa (TIE)
  - Runner-up: Richard Starzak and Mark Burton – Shaun the Sheep Movie
- Best Foreign Language Film:
  - Joshua Oppenheimer – The Look of Silence
  - Runner-up: Kornél Mundruczó – White God
- Best Documentary:
  - Joshua Oppenheimer – The Look of Silence
  - Runner-up: Asif Kapadia – Amy
- Best Cinematography:
  - Edward Lachman – Carol
  - Runner-up: Emmanuel Lubezki – The Revenant
- Best Editing:
  - Margaret Sixel – Mad Max: Fury Road
  - Runner-up: Tom McArdle – Spotlight
- Best New Filmmaker:
  - Marielle Heller – The Diary of a Teenage Girl
  - Runner-up: Alex Garland – Ex Machina
- Best Use of Music in a Film:
  - Love & Mercy
- Best Ensemble Cast:
  - Spotlight
  - Runner-up: The Big Short
