= Charles Randolph =

American screenwriter and film producer

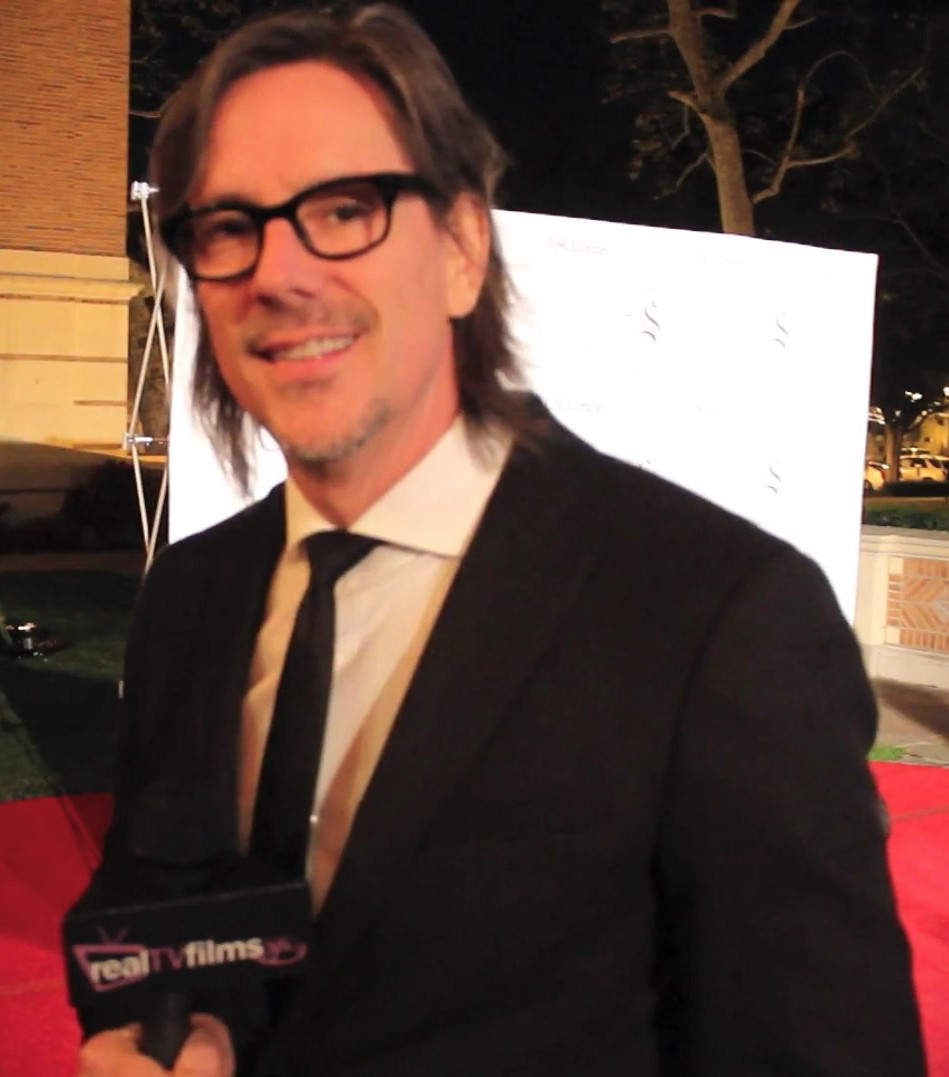
- Randolph in 2016
- Born: Nashville, Tennessee, U.S.
- Occupations: Screenwriter, film, television producer
- Years active: 2001–present
- Spouse(s): Regina D. Sullivan (m. 1989; div. 1991) Mili Avital (m. 2004)
- Children: 2

Charles Randolph (born February 28, 1963) is an American screenwriter and producer for film and television. In 2015, he won the Academy Award for Best Adapted Screenplay along with Adam McKay for co-writing The Big Short. In 2019, he wrote and produced the film Bombshell, which was directed by Jay Roach and starred Charlize Theron, Margot Robbie, and Nicole Kidman.

== Early life ==
Randolph was born in Nashville, Tennessee. After graduating from Yale Divinity School, he worked as a cultural studies and philosophy professor at various universities in Vienna, Austria (including Webster Vienna Private University) in the 1990s.

== Screenwriting ==
In 1997, Randolph spent a weekend giving lectures at the University of Southern California. From a chance meeting with someone who worked for the Farrelly brothers, Randolph was inspired to attempt screenwriting.

Randolph has written screenplays for several films and TV movies including The Life of David Gale (2003), The Interpreter (2005), Love & Other Drugs (2010) and The Big Short (2015).

In 2016, Randolph received the Writers Guild of America Award for Best Adapted Screenplay, the Critic’s Choice Award for Best Adapted Screenplay, the Empire Award for Best Screenplay, and the BAFTA Award for Best Adapted Screenplay and the Academy Award for Best Writing Adapted Screenplay for co-writing The Big Short with Adam McKay. He was additionally nominated for the Golden Globe Award for Best Screenplay. Randolph invested nearly a year adapting The Big Short; three months for an initial draft and another three months to reduce the complexity.

== Personal life ==
Randolph is married to Israeli actress Mili Avital, with whom he has two children.

== Filmography ==
Film

Year	Title	Writer	Producer	Notes
2003	The Life of David Gale	Yes	No	
2005	The Interpreter	Yes	No	
2009	Tenderness	No	Yes	
2010	Love & Other Drugs	Yes	Yes	
2015	The Big Short	Yes	No	Academy Award for Best Adapted Screenplay; BAFTA Award for Best Adapted Screenplay; Nominated - Golden Globe Award for Best Screenplay
2019	Bombshell	Yes	Yes	

Television

Year	Title	Writer	Producer	Notes
2001	Untitled Charles Randolph Project	Yes	Yes	TV movie
2010	The Wonderful Maladys	Yes	Yes	TV pilot
2013	The Missionary	Yes	Yes	TV pilot
2016	Exposed	Yes	Yes	TV movie
