= 2015 Los Angeles Film Critics Association Awards =

Annual US film awards ceremony

41st LAFCA Awards
- Date: December 6, 2015
- Country: United States

Highlights
- Best Picture: Spotlight

The 41st Los Angeles Film Critics Association Awards, given by the Los Angeles Film Critics Association (LAFCA), honored the best in film for 2015.

== Winners ==
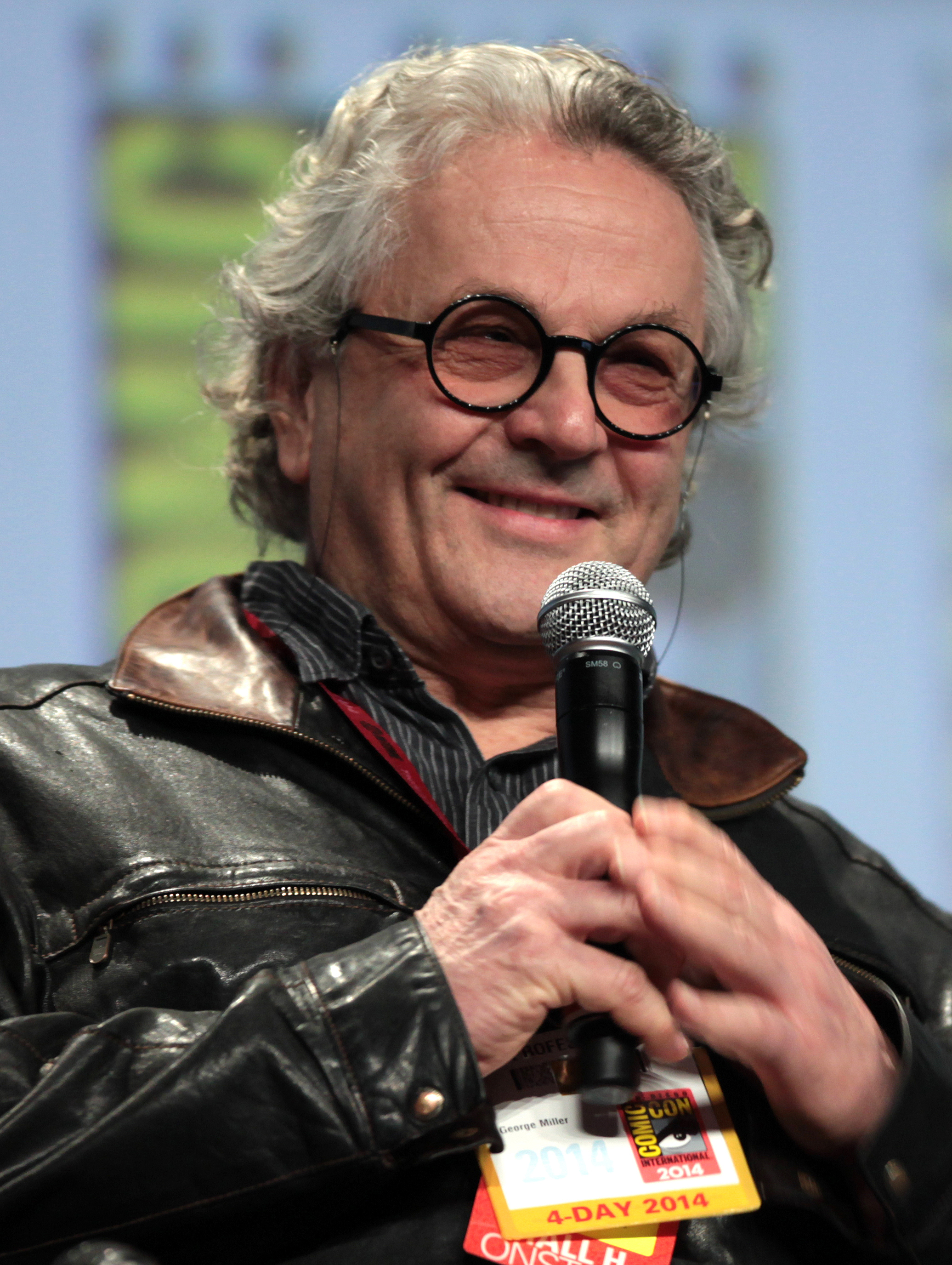
George Miller, Best Director winner

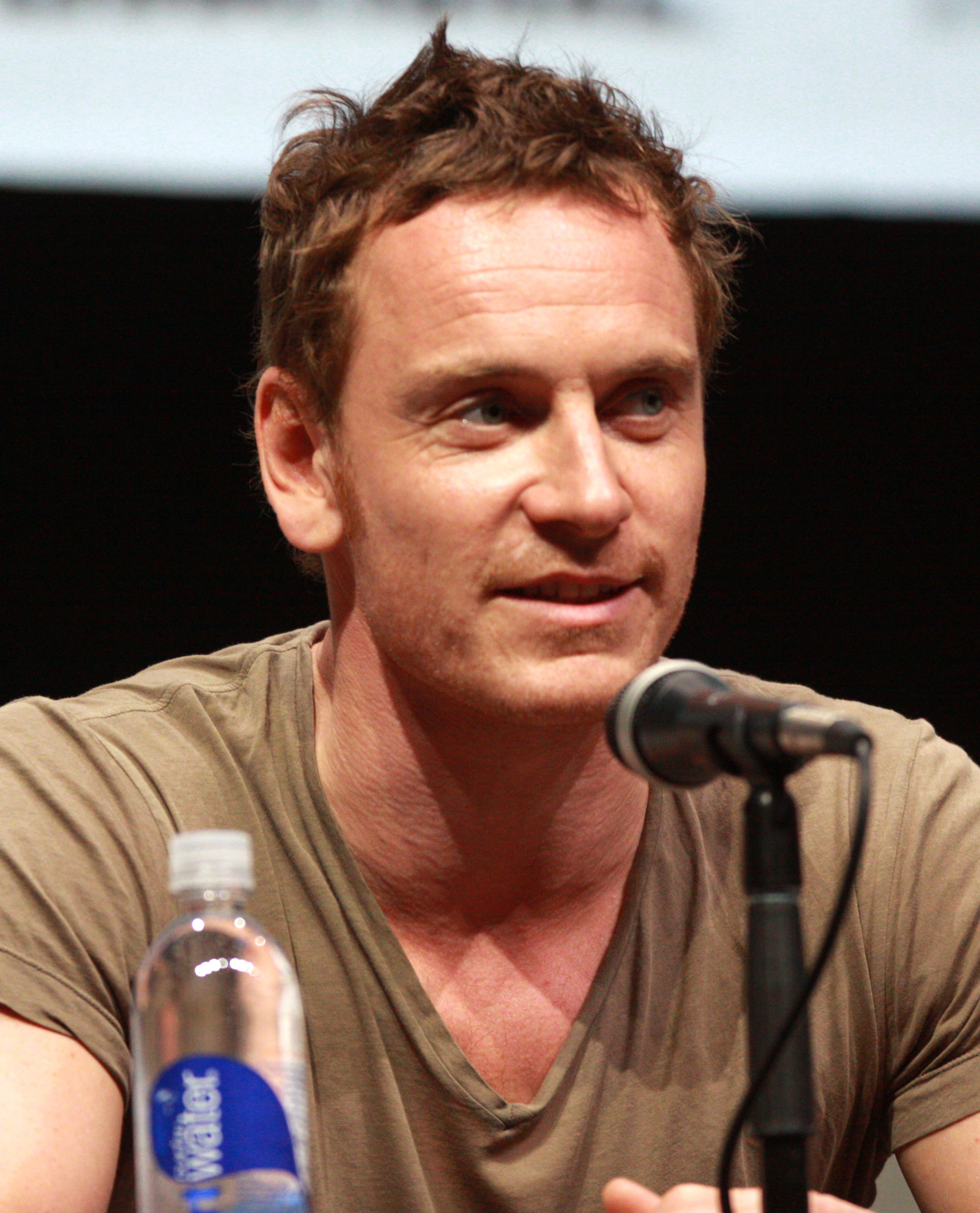
Michael Fassbender, Best Actor winner

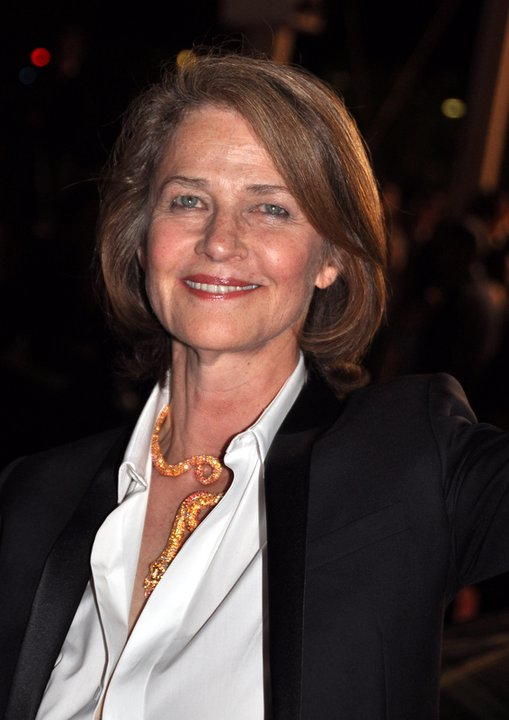
Charlotte Rampling, Best Actress winner

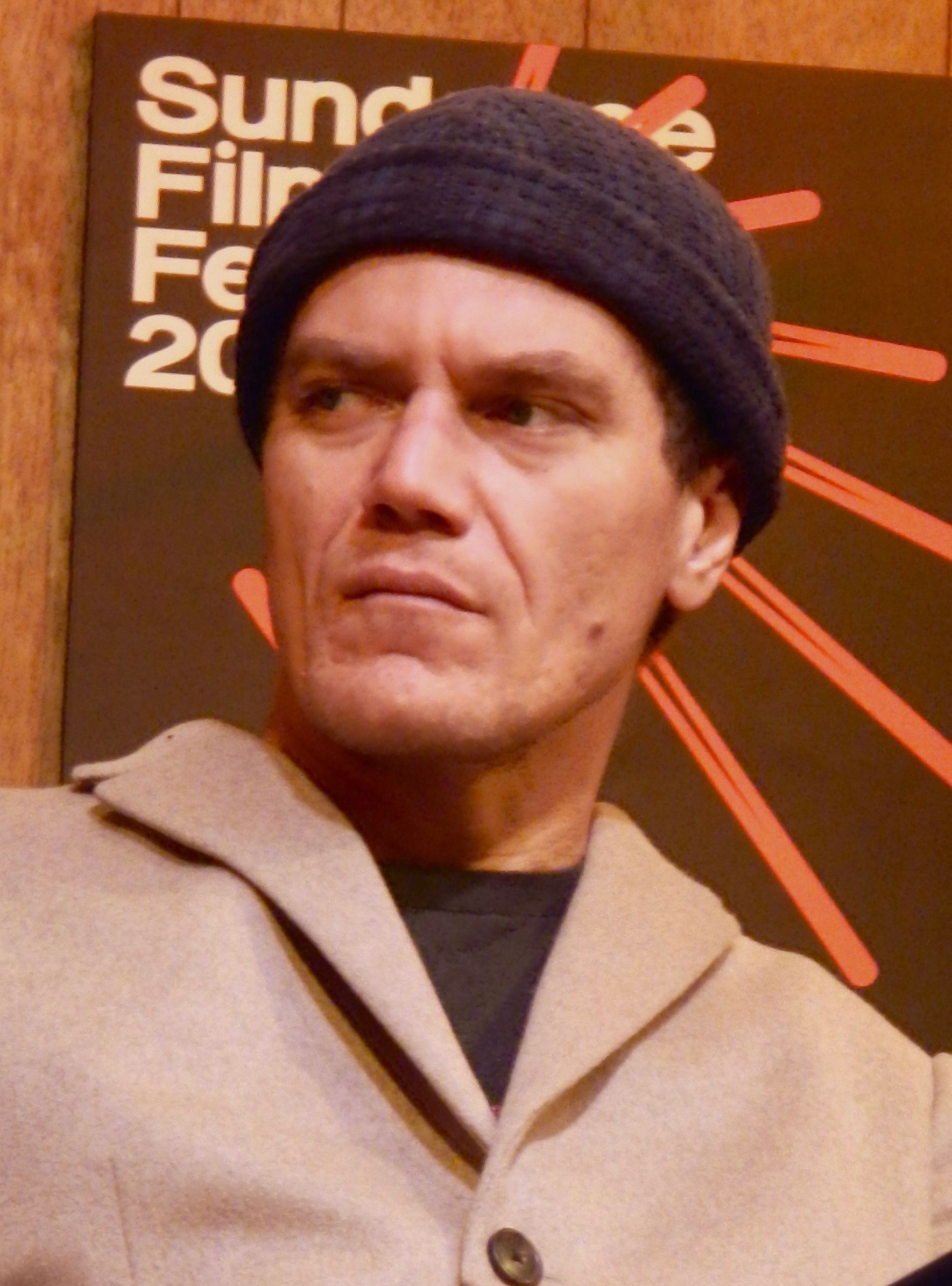
Michael Shannon, Best Supporting Actor winner

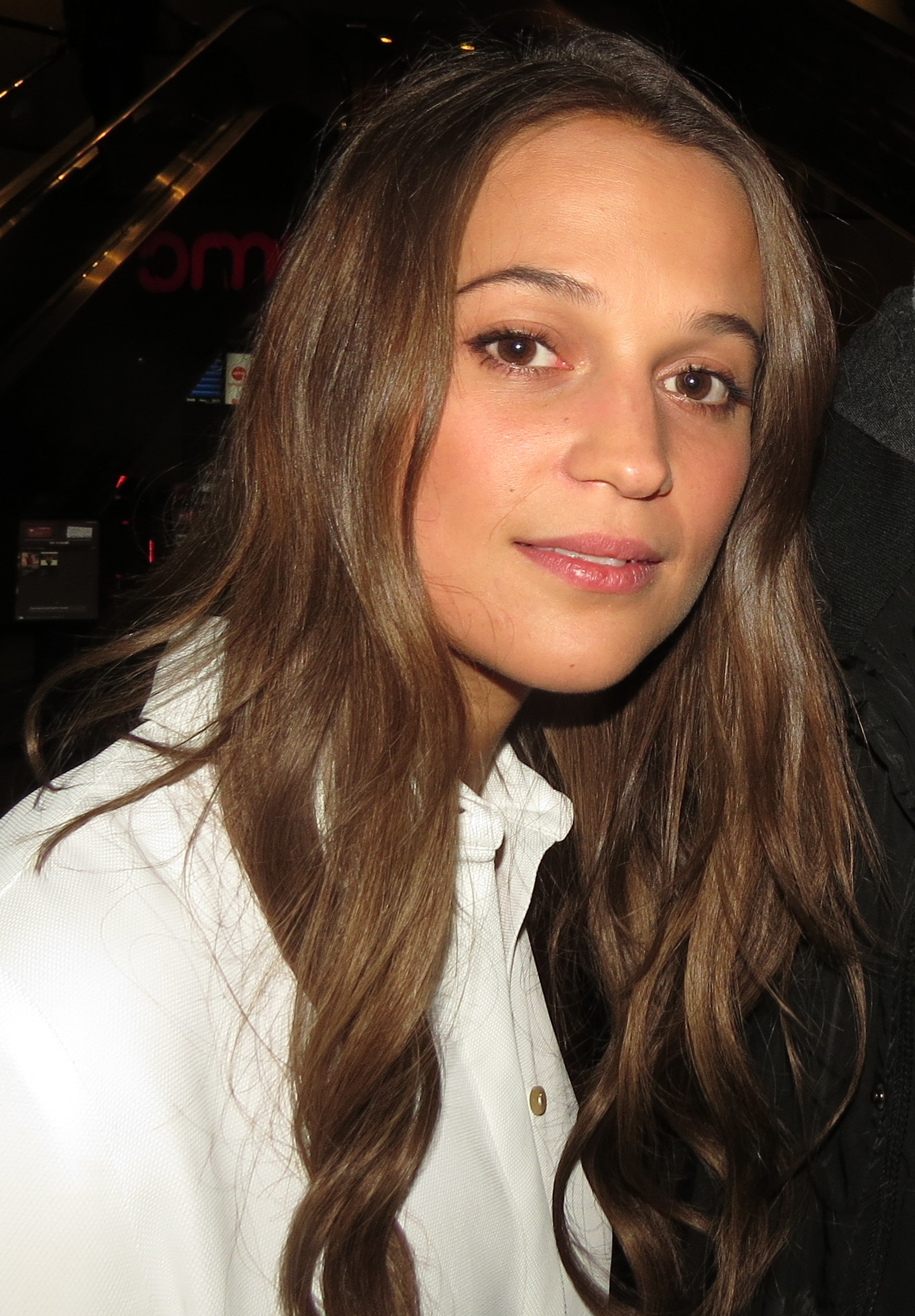
Alicia Vikander, Best Supporting Actress winner

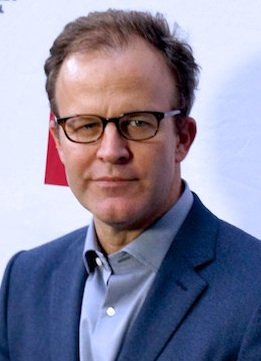
Tom McCarthy, Best Screenplay co-winner

- Best Picture:
  - Spotlight
    - Runner-up: Mad Max: Fury Road
- Best Director:
  - George Miller – Mad Max: Fury Road
    - Runner-up: Todd Haynes – Carol
- Best Actor:
  - Michael Fassbender – Steve Jobs
    - Runner-up: Géza Röhrig – Son of Saul
- Best Actress:
  - Charlotte Rampling – 45 Years
    - Runner-up: Saoirse Ronan – Brooklyn
- Best Supporting Actor:
  - Michael Shannon – 99 Homes
    - Runner-up: Mark Rylance – Bridge of Spies
- Best Supporting Actress:
  - Alicia Vikander – Ex Machina
    - Runner-up: Kristen Stewart – Clouds of Sils Maria
- Best Screenplay:
  - Josh Singer and Tom McCarthy – Spotlight
    - Runner-up: Charlie Kaufman – Anomalisa
- Best Cinematography:
  - John Seale – Mad Max: Fury Road
    - Runner-up: Edward Lachman – Carol
- Best Editing:
  - Hank Corwin – The Big Short
    - Runner-up: Margaret Sixel – Mad Max: Fury Road
- Best Production Design:
  - Colin Gibson – Mad Max: Fury Road
    - Runner-up: Judy Becker – Carol
- Best Music Score:
  - Carter Burwell – Anomalisa and Carol
    - Runner-up: Ennio Morricone – The Hateful Eight
- Best Foreign Language Film:
  - Son of Saul • Hungary
    - Runner-up: The Tribe • Ukraine
- Best Documentary/Non-Fiction Film:
  - Amy
    - Runner-up: The Look of Silence
- Best Animation:
  - Anomalisa
    - Runner-up: Inside Out
- New Generation Award:
  - Ryan Coogler – Creed
- Career Achievement Award:
  - Anne V. Coates
- Special Citation:
  - David Shepard
