= 2017 New York Film Critics Circle Awards =

83rd New York Film Critics Circle Awards

83rd NYFCC Awards

January 3, 2018

Best Picture:
Lady Bird

The 83rd New York Film Critics Circle Awards, honoring the best in film for 2017, were announced on November 30, 2017 and presented on January 3, 2018.

The ceremony was dedicated to the memory of American film historian, journalist, author, filmmaker, screenwriter, documentarian, and film and literary critic Richard Schickel, who died on February 18, 2017.

== Winners ==
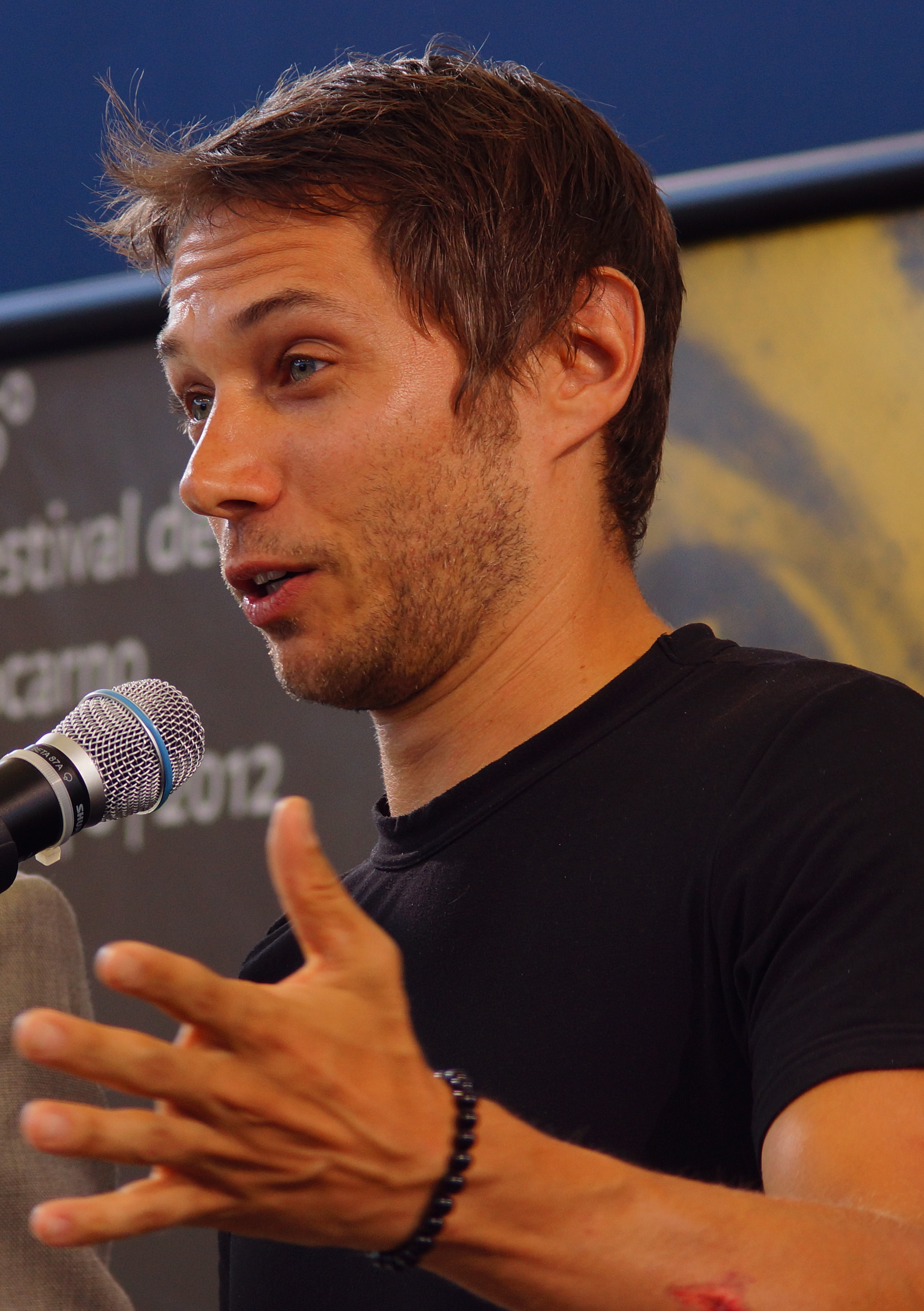
Sean Baker, Best Director winner

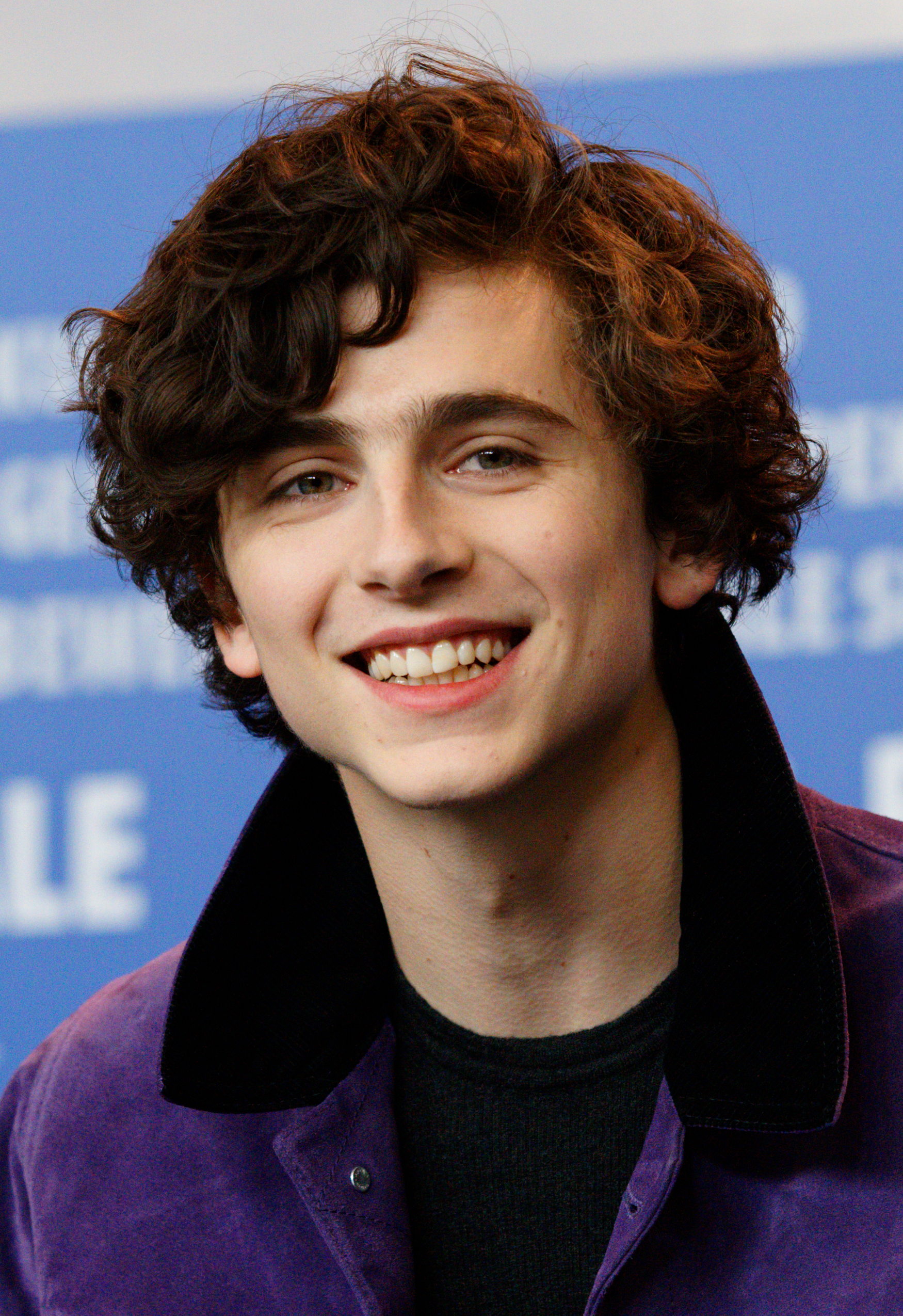
Timothée Chalamet, Best Actor winner

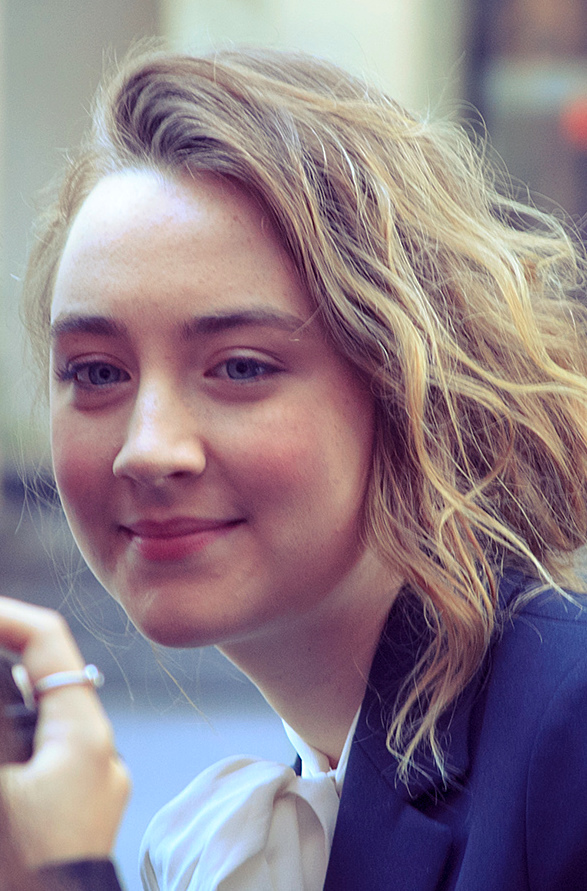
Saoirse Ronan, Best Actress winner

- Best Film:
  - Lady Bird
- Best Director:
  - Sean Baker – The Florida Project
- Best Actor:
  - Timothée Chalamet – Call Me by Your Name
- Best Actress:
  - Saoirse Ronan – Lady Bird
- Best Supporting Actor:
  - Willem Dafoe – The Florida Project
- Best Supporting Actress:
  - Tiffany Haddish – Girls Trip
- Best Screenplay:
  - Paul Thomas Anderson – Phantom Thread
- Best Animated Film:
  - Coco
- Best Cinematography:
  - Rachel Morrison – Mudbound
- Best Non-Fiction Film:
  - Faces Places
- Best Foreign Language Film:
  - BPM (Beats per Minute) • France
- Best First Film:
  - Jordan Peele – Get Out
- Special Award:
  - Molly Haskell
