= Cultural Olympiad Digital Edition =

The Cultural Olympiad Digital Edition (CODE) was a digital art showcase at the 2010 Winter Olympics in Vancouver, Canada. The festival, which lasted from February 4 to 21, was the first of its kind at a major sporting event, showcasing the new digital media styles in art, music, and film.

First conceived in 2007, the growth of social networking sites contributed to the eventual popularity of the event. One of the installations, Vectorial Elevation (a spotlight-based light installation over Vancouver's English bay), had over 20,000 individual design submissions.

CODE Live was curated by digital artist Malcolm Levy.

== Vancouver public spaces ==
Throughout the time of the CODE festival, not only a number of small areas turned into exhibition areas, but the city itself was transformed by digital art displays. Some of these pieces were:

- Vectorial Elevation: Rafael Lozano-Hemmer (Canada)
- Fearless Mobile, OMG IM ON DOT TV, Untold Histories: W2 Community Media Arts Society (Canada)
- Glocal Urban Screen Project: Surrey Art Gallery (Canada)
- Intersection 2010: Bright Light: Presented by the City of Vancouver (Canada)
- NeoGrafik: NomIg (Ed Jordan, Stephanie MacKay), Alexis Laurence
- PaCuBoxes: Tom Kuo, co-presentation with the Canadian Film Centre (Canada)

All these installations are attempting to connect to the largest audiences possible, unlike the smaller exhibits.

== CODE Collections ==
One internet Installation, CODE collections, showcased various aspects of landscape, culture, and people of Canada. Each collection was prefaced by a short introduction in both English and French, followed by pages of submitted photographs.

== CODE screen ==
Accessible wherever one could find a computer screen, this section of CODE showcased creations of Canada's visual artists. Nearly 20 recipients of the Governor General's Awards for Visual and Media Arts had work on display. Using an application, users were able to use an interactive catalog to easily find something they could enjoy.

Some pieces are:

- Colour Shift
- Let the Light Be
- Consumerism - I Shop Therefore, I am?
- Naturally
- When the Night Comes
- Books, Records
- Contains Animal Byproducts! — Pet Food for the Brain
- Corporatization – A Persistent L'il System
- Test Pattern
- The Stuff of Us — Our Objects Ourselves
- If These Walls Could Talk — Room for reflection
- Competition — Winning isn't Everything
- The Art of Knowledge — When seeing is believing.
- Group Show — Groups bring us together. Groups place us apart.

== CODE Live ==
CODE live, blended interactive art with digital music. Placing the events at three well-known sites, events ranged from artists such as Chromeo performing to an installation of the Reactable on display.

=== CODE Live 1 ===
Featured at the Great Northern Way Campus, a center for teaching digital art and new media, CODE Live 1 showcased the following exhibits:

- 787 cliparts by Oliver Laric (Austria)
- Artificial Moon by Wang Yuyang, curated by Li Zhenhua (China)
- Cambridge Bay: A Time and a Place by Souns featuring Tanya Tagaq (Canada)
- Condemned Bulbes by Artificiel (Canada)
- Dune 4.0 by Studio Roosegaarde (Netherlands)
- Foreign Voices, Common Stories (Ghettoblaster) by James Phillips, presented by Analogue Nostalgia (Canada)
- Instant Places: Canada CODE by Ian Birse, Laura Kavanaugh (Canada)
- Paparazzi Bots by Ken Rinaldo (USA)
- PLAY: The Hertzian Collective by Geoffrey Shea (Canada)
- Reactable by Sergi Jordà, Martin Kaltenbrunner, Günter Geiger and Marcos Alonso (Austria, Spain)
- Breaking the Ice by Society for Arts and Technology (Canada) at Great Northern Way Campus and the Bibliothèque de Montréal
- Vested by Don Ritter (Canada)
- We Are Stardust by George Legrady (Canada)
- Where Are You? by Luc Courschene (Canada)
- Eco-Art by Brendan Wypich (Ontario)
- ""World Without Water"" by Suzette Araujo, Tahir Mahmood and Kalli Paakspuu (Canada)

=== CODE live 2 ===
Located at Emily Carr University, the use of unconventional exhibit spaces allowed for a unique venue for participatory art. Acts included:

- The Paradise Institute by Janet Cardiff and Georges Bures Miller. Organized by the National Gallery of Canada (Canada)
- CODE.lab by M. Simon Levin and Jer Thorp with Emily Carr students and faculty (Canada)
- *glisten)HIVE by Julie Andreyev, Maria Lantin and Simon Overstall (Canada)
- Odd Spaces by Faisal Anwar (Canada)
- Song of Solomon by Julian Jonker and Ralph Borland (South Africa)
- CODE Dialogues, co-presented with Emily Carr University of Art and Design (Canada)
- Electromode, curated by Valérie Lamontagne (Canada) / Peau d'Âne
- Blue Code, Jacket Antics and Tornado Dress by Barbara Layne, Studio subTela (Canada)
- Company Keeper and Emotional Ties by Sara Diamond (Canada)
- Electric Skin and Barking Mad by Suzi Webster with Jordan Benwick (Canada)
- Peau d'Âne by Valerie Lamontagne (Canada)
- Skorpions and Captain Electric by Joanna Berzowska, XS Labs (Canada)
- Tendrils by Thecla Schiphorst (Canada)
- Walking City and Living Pod by Ying Gao (Canada)

=== CODE Live 3 ===
Within the Vancouver Public Library's central branch on Georgia St, CODE Live 3 featured these writings:

- Seen by David Rokeby (Canada)
- The Sacred Touch by Ranjit Makkuni (India)
- When the Gods Came Down to Earth by Srinivas Krishna (Canada)
- Room to Make Your Peace by 2010

=== CODE Live Night Life ===
For eight nights, electronic musicians played at the Great Northern Way campus; these exhibits were not free but included many popular musical artists.

- Acts like: Mike Relm, Junior Boys, The Golden Filter
- Hard Rubber (a festival event featuring a 14-piece groove band)
- Kid Koala
- Jamming the Networks: Modern Deep Left Quartet, Mike Shannon
- Bell Orchestre
- Martyn, 2562, Deadbeat
- Chromeo

== CODE Motion Pictures ==
This exhibit showcased over 50 Canadian filmmakers. A common theme among their films, because they were for the Olympics, was the movement of the human body. Films were shown both online or on larger projection screens at "celebration sites"

Some of the films are:

- 365 Directed by: Matt Embry
- Aerial Artistry Directed by: Talia Pura
- Momentum Directed by: Sheona Mcdonald
- Patin futé Directed by: Jonathan Beaudry Lontinville, Mélanie Breton, Diana M. Cortijo, Emmanuel Lagacé, Priscillia Rousseau, Christine Thériault
- Duet Directed by: Raul Sanchez Inglis
- RGB Move Directed by: Ryan Enn Hughes
- Geared-up Directed by: Kenneth Sherman.
- Sheng Qi (Souffle de vie) Directed by:Maxime-Claude L'Écuyer
- Climb Directed by: Brett Bell
- Play Directed by: Lisa Porter

== See also ==
- Cultural Olympiad
