= Interactive Futures =

Biennial conference and exhibition in Vancouver

Interactive Futures (IF) was a biennial conference and exhibition, hosted in Vancouver, British Columbia, Canada, that explored current tendencies, research and dialogue related to the intersection of technology and art. Interactive Futures included a variety of events such as lectures, workshops, exhibitions, and panels in an effort to provide opportunities for discourse by local, national and international researchers and practitioners.

== History ==
Interactive Futures (IF) has been active since 2002 holding a conference alongside its exhibitions and performances. From 2002 through 2007, Interactive Futures has grown from a single venue event, held at the University of Victoria that featured local researchers and artists, to a multi-venue event with international cultural partners, an active archival website and international publications. For IF'09, Julie Andreyev and Maria Lantin became co-Directors and relocated IF to Intersections Digital Studios, Emily Carr University of Art + Design.

== Mandate ==
Interactive Futures (IF) is a forum for showing current tendencies in new media art as well as a conference for exploring ideas and research related to technology and art. IF supports a conference, keynote addresses, presentations, panel discussions, exhibitions, and performances. National and international presenters, performers and artists acknowledged for their research and production are invited to contribute to an expansion of knowledge within the IF thematic. IF provides a forum for artists and researchers of Canada to interact with international members of the media arts communities within an intensive setting.

== Interactive Futures 2011 ==
IF'11: Animal Influence conference was concerned with the themes of animal cognition, consciousness and agency in relation to emerging new media technologies of image, text, sound and video. The conference was funded by Canada’s Social Sciences and Humanities Research Council (SSHRC), the British Columbia Arts Council (BCAC), and the Consulat Général de France à Vancouver.

The 2011 symposium, guest curated by Carol Gigliotti, focused on new media artwork influenced by the growing wealth of knowledge about other species' perceptions of the world

The sub-themes of Perception, Agency, and Consciousness/Compassion were explored through exhibitions, presentations, panel discussions, film screenings and workshops.

=== Keynote Speakers ===
Lisa Jevbratt: Professor in the Media Art Technology program of University of California, Santa Barbara.
Marc Bekoff: Professor Emeritus of Ecology and Evolutionary Biology at the University of Colorado Boulder, Fellow of the Animal Behaviour Society, and former Guggenheim Fellow.

== Interactive Futures 2009 ==
IF'09: Stereo focused on research, production, and experiments with perception in relation to the knowledge of two-channel sound, and stereographic 3D. The sub-themes of Stereographics, Co-Locative, and Sensory Illusions were explored through exhibitions, presentations, panel discussions, film screenings and workshops.

=== Keynote Speakers ===
George Legrady: Director of the Experimental Visualization Lab in the Media Arts & Technology doctoral program at the University of California, Santa Barbara.
Paula Levine: Associate Professor of Art at San Francisco State University.
Munro Ferguson: Award-winning Canadian Film Director and Animator.

== Interactive Futures 2007 ==
IF'07: The New Screen sought to explore emerging forms of screen-based media from the diverse repertoire of artists, theorists, writers, filmmakers, developers and educators. The conference was sponsored by the Victoria Film Festival, Open Space Artist-Run Centre and the Canada Council.

=== Keynote Speakers ===
Kate Pullinger: Canadian novelist and author of digital fiction, lecturing at De Montfort University.
Don Ritter: Canadian new media and installation artist, and writer.
Mijram Struppek: Urbanist, researcher and consultant in Berlin.

== Interactive Futures 2006 ==
IF'06: Audio Visions focused on exploring new forms of audio-based multimedia art, music theatre, performance, and installation. The event was held in joint collaboration with the Digital Art Weeks founded by Art Clay and Juerg Gutknecht on the Institute of Computer Systems of ETH Zurich, Switzerland

== Interactive Futures 2004 ==
IF'04: New Media Crossing Boundaries, included exhibition work from Canadian artists Julie Andreyev, Jean Piché, Kenneth Newby and Aleksandra Dulic along with international artist, and experimental electronic musician DJ Spooky.
