= Daina Warren =

Canadian contemporary artist and curator

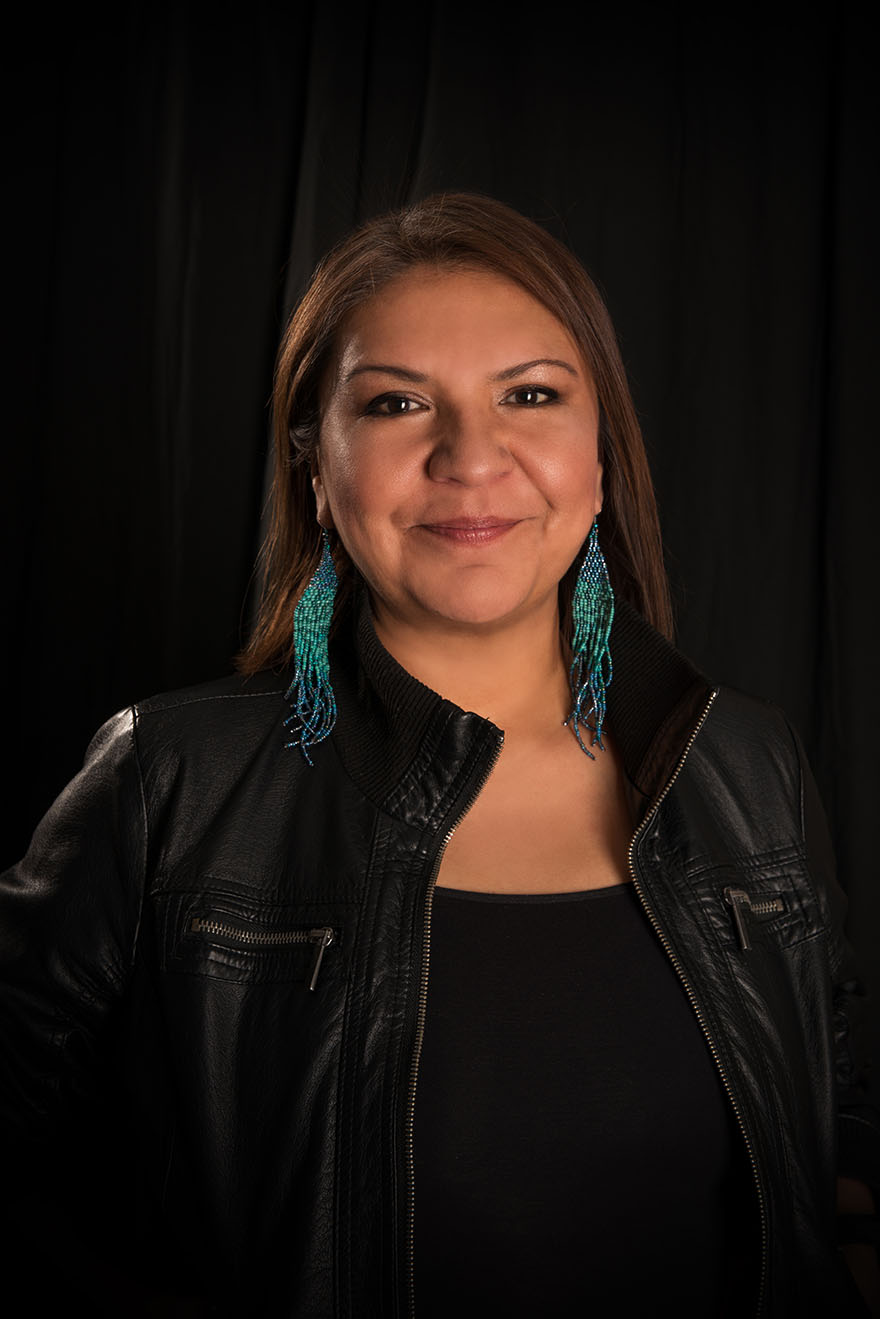
- portrait by Dano Tanaka, 2022
- Education: University of British Columbia

Daina Warren (born 1974) is a Canadian contemporary artist and curator. She is a member of the Montana Akamihk Cree Nation in Maskwacis (Bear Hills), Alberta. Her interest in curating Aboriginal art and work with Indigenous artists is at the forefront of her research.

== Biography ==
Daina graduated with a Bachelor of Fine Arts degree from Emily Carr Institute of Art and Design (ECUAD) in 2003 and gained an MA Critical and Curatorial Studies from the University of British Columbia in 2012. After receiving an Aboriginal Curatorial Collective Residency to work with grunt gallery in Vancouver, British Columbia in 2000, Daina remained at the gallery as associate curator and administrator until 2009. She curated numerous shows at grunt gallery, including a performance titled Taking Stick Cabaret, a collaboration with Lisa C. Ravensbergen. Warren served as curator and director of Urban Shaman Contemporary Aboriginal Art in Winnipeg, Manitoba from 2011 to 2022. Warren was elected as one of four Indigenous women curators as part of 2015 Asia-Pacific Visual Arts Delegation to participate in the First Nations Curators Exchange an International Visitors Program of the 8th Asia-Pacific Trienniale (APT8) in Brisbane, Australia. In April 2022, Warren moved to Santa Fe, New Mexico to become the Program Manager for the Institute of American Indian Arts Research Center for Contemporary Native American Arts. She was awarded the 2022 Manitoba Arts Award of Distinction. The prize is awarded every other year" to a professional artist or arts/cultural professional in recognition of the highest level of artistic excellence and contribution to the development of the arts in Manitoba".

== Awards and residencies ==
- Canada Council for the Arts’ Aboriginal Curatorial Collective Residency, grunt gallery in Vancouver, British Columbia (2000-2001)
- Canada Council for the Arts’ Aboriginal Curatorial Collective Residency, National Gallery of Canada in Ottawa, Ontario (2010-2011)
- Emily Award from Emily Carr University (2015)
- Hnatyshyn Foundation Award for Curatorial Excellency (2018)
- Manitoba Arts Award of Distinction (2022)

== Group and solo exhibitions ==
- Or Gallery, Vancouver
- Campbell River Public Gallery, Campbell River
- Alternator Centre for Contemporary Art, Kelowna

== Curated exhibitions ==
- Deconstructing the FirstNationsAboriginalNativeIndian, 2000, Emily Carr University
- Don’t Stop Me Now, National Gallery of Canada
- Cosmologies: anything that exists has a beginning, 2009, Vancouver International Centre for Contemporary Art
- If These Walls Could Talk, CODE Screen 2010 Vancouver Olympics
- Contains Animal Byproducts!—Pet Food for the Brain, CODE Screen 2010 Vancouver Olympics
- âkâm’askîhk ᐋᑳᒼ’ᐊᐢᑮ (Across the land), 2017, Winnipeg Film Group
- Transformative Power: Indigenous Feminism, Vicki Myhren Gallery, University of Denver 9/15/-11/22/2022
