= Sophie Hackett =

Canadian curator (born 1971)

- Born: Sophie Elizabeth Hackett; 1971 (age 54–55); Montreal, Quebec, Canada
- Known for: Curator of Photography
- Partner: Amy Langstaff

Sophie Hackett (born 1971) is the curator of photography at the Art Gallery of Ontario, Toronto.

== Career ==
Sophie Elizabeth Hackett was born in Montreal, Quebec. She completed her BA at the University of Toronto (1990-1994) but became interested in photography and earned a Bachelor of Fine Arts, Photography at the Emily Carr Institute of Art & Design, Vancouver (1995-1998). After graduation, she worked for the Jane Corkin Gallery in Toronto from 1998–2000, followed by a Curatorial Internship, Photography, at the Art Gallery of Ontario (AGO) (2002–2003), then did her Master of Arts, Humanities (Art History) at the University of Chicago (2003–2004). In 2005-2006, she was appointed a J. Paul Getty Museum, Los Angeles Graduate Intern in the Department of Photographs, then became Assistant Curator, Photography, at the AGO (2006–2013), Associate Curator (2013-2016) and in 2016, she was appointed full Curator, Photography, taking over from Maia-Mari Sutnik and actively curating, contributing to publications, and participating on juries, both national and international. Hackett's area of specialization is vernacular photography, photography in relation to queerness; and photography in Canada from the 1960s to the 1990s.

She also has served as an adjunct faculty member in Ryerson University’s Master’s degree program in Film + Photography Preservation and Collections Management, and was a 2017 fellow with the Center for Curatorial Leadership. She was a juror four times for the Grange Prize / Aimia AGO Photography Prize in 2010, 2012, 2014 and 2017. She also served as a juror for the Scotiabank Photography Award for 2020 (Dana Claxton), 2021 (Deanna Bowen) and upcoming for 2022.

== Exhibitions ==
Although Hackett`s first major show was in 2002 with the touring exhibition The Found and the Familiar: Snapshots in Contemporary Canadian Art at Gallery TPW (Hackett served on the Board of Gallery TPW from 2007–2019 (2011–2019 as president)), she only began to achieve critical attention with such shows as What It Means To be Seen: Photography and Queer Visibility and Fan the Flames: Queer Positions in Photography, two exhibitions which she assembled in 2014 as part of the AGO’s World Pride 2014 programming and Outsiders: American Photography and Film, 1950s–1980s, which she co-curated, in 2016. In 2018, she curated Anthropocene at the same time as the National Gallery of Canada to chronicle the irreversible impact of humans on the Earth accompanied by a film and book by Edward Burtynsky, Jennifer Baichwal, and Nicholas de Pencier, and in 2020, she curated and hung a major exhibition of Diane Arbus titled Diane Arbus: Photographs, 1956–1971 which the Globe and Mail called a tasteful, chronological display. The exhibition featured 150 photographs which the AGO acquired in 2016 along with another 300-odd photographs by Arbus, making the AGO a major center of Arbus photographs but the show was quickly closed due to the pandemic.

In 2022 the AGO exhibited another Hackett show: What Matters Most: Photographs of Black Life, the Fade Resistance Collection. This group of 3500 Polaroids documenting African American family life from the 1970s to the early 2000s, was assembled by Canadian photographer, physician and educator Zun Lee and acquired by the AGO in 2018. In 2023, the show Casa Susanna opened, co-curated by Hackett with French photo historian, Isabelle Bonnet, as well as American scholar of trans history Susan Stryker and coproduced by the Art Gallery of Ontario and the Rencontres D'Arles. It offers insight into the historically significant crossdressing scene. Hackett discussed the work of Casa Suzanna on Youtube.

== Writing ==
Hackett's has authored essays for catalogues of shows in which she was the curator or co-curator such as What It Means to be Seen: Photography and Queer Visibility, Ryerson Image Centre, Toronto, in 2014 which the Globe and Mail said put the identities of LGBT artists in context; and the essay and short texts for each of the artists she wrote for the catalogue of the Outsiders: American Photography and Film, 1950s–1980s exhibition in 2016 at the Art Gallery of Ontario (she acted as co-editor of the book/catalogue which accompanied the show as well). Other major texts by Hackett can be found in books such her essay "A New Scene in Montreal", in the book by Tavi Gevinson (Georgiana Uhlyarik, Ed.) Introducing Suzy Lake (London and Toronto: Black Dog Publishing and the Art Gallery of Ontario, 2014) and articles such as "Queer Looking: Joan E. Biren’s Slide Shows", Aperture, no. 218 (spring 2015) as well as "Encounters in the Museum: The Experience of Photographic Objects" in the Ryerson Image Centre and MIT Press volume The "Public" Life of Photographs (Toronto and Boston, 2016) (here she relayed an account of the formation of the photography department at the AGO and its particular character) and are found in many other publications such as her "Bobbie in Context" chapter in Imagining Everyday Life: Engagements with Vernacular Photography (Steidl and The Walther Collection, 2020).

== Recognition ==
Her exhibitions are notable for the way they reveal the AGO collection of more than 40,000 photographs and Hackett for jumping "deftly between eras, materials, subjects and genres, laying bare both the ubiquity of the photographic image, and the form’s persistent plasticity" as well as for defying cliché in presenting "thoughtful and political" views of gay culture. In addition, her exhibition of Introducing Suzy Lake which she co-curated with Georgiana Uhlyarik won the 2015 Ontario Association of Art Galleries prize for exhibition installation and design.
