= University of British Columbia (disambiguation) =

The University of British Columbia is a public research university located principally near Vancouver, British Columbia, Canada.

The University of British Columbia may also refer to the following:

- One of the university's three satellite campuses:
  - University of British Columbia Okanagan, located in Kelowna, British Columbia, Canada.
  - University of British Columbia Robson Square, located in Vancouver, British Columbia, Canada.
  - University of British Columbia Great Northern Way Campus, located in Vancouver, British Columbia, Canada.
- University of British Columbia Press, an affiliated publishing house, sometimes referred to simply as University of British Columbia in bibliographical citations
