= The Store (film) =

1983 film by Frederick Wiseman

- Poster
- Directed by: Frederick Wiseman
- Distributed by: Zipporah Films
- Release date: December 14, 1983 (U.S.)
- Running time: 118 minutes

The Store is a 1983 documentary film directed by Frederick Wiseman, his fifteenth feature-length documentary, and his first in color.

== Synopsis ==
The film explores the Dallas Neiman Marcus flagship store's wealthy customers, salespeople, sales managers, buyers, suppliers, and back office jewelry craftspeople, and its corporate headquarters during the four weeks between Thanksgiving and Christmas 1982. The American Cinematheque described the film as showing "the selection, presentation, marketing, pricing, advertising and selling of a vast array of consumer products including designer clothes and furs, jewelry, perfumes, shoes, electronic products, sportswear, china and porcelain and many other goods", as well as the store's "internal management and organizational aspects ... i.e., sales meetings, development of marketing and advertising strategies, training, personnel practices and sales techniques".

In one scene, a department store manager tells his sales team, "There's really one purpose to our being at Neiman Marcus, one grand purpose, and that's to make sales. Because it's an institution created to make sales." Stephen Mamber of UCLA noted a "bizarre Singing Birthday Chicken (Eastern Onion Singing Telegram) who turns into a stripper". The film culminates in a speech by Stanley Marcus, introduced by Art Buchwald, with Lady Bird Johnson in attendance, at a 75-year anniversary dinner.

== Reception ==
A review on notcoming.com noted that "Wiseman alternates longer scenes with more atmospheric footage, and he often uses brief shots of elevators, stairs or escalators as transitional devices". Stephen Mamber of UCLA wrote that "Wiseman keeps returning to a sable coat salesman so often it feels like the entire film has been a document of his effort".

Film scholar Barry Keith Grant argued that The Store marked a shift in Wiseman's filmmaking, moving beyond the liberal humanism of his earlier films toward a more politically conscious, deconstructionist approach. Grant paired The Store with Model (1981) as films examining advertising and conspicuous consumption, arguing that the two together with Meat (1976) form a trilogy exploring what Vance Packard had called "the packaged soul". Grant described the films as Wiseman's "most overtly Brechtian", citing the director's use of mirrors and on-screen production apparatus to foreground the constructed nature of consumer imagery. Grant reported that some reviewers had been disappointed that Model and The Store revealed "nothing new about American culture", a view he rejected.

== Release ==
On December 14, 1983, PBS broadcast The Store.
