= Janet Wang =

Canadian visual artist and educator (born 1977)

- Born: 1977 (age 48–49)
- Occupations: Artist, educator
- Known for: Examining Chinese diasporic identity in Canada
- Notable work: Spotlight: Janet Wang, Vancouver Art Gallery (2024)
- Website: https://janetwang.com/

Janet Wang (born 1977), is a Canadian visual artist and educator based in Vancouver, British Columbia, known for her work examining Chinese diasporic identity in Canada.

== Biography ==
Janet Wang, born in 1977 as a second-generation immigrant of Chinese descent, completed her Bachelor of Fine Arts at the University of British Columbia and obtained a Master of Fine Arts from the University of Leeds. She is an associate professor at Emily Carr University of Art and Design.

== Art Practice ==
Wang's practice includes sculptural installations, painting, drawing, and new media. Her work examines identity formation by appropriating and challenging social patterns. By drawing on historical canons and everyday traditions, Wang uses familiar elements to connect with viewers.

Wang's new studies and experiments with form emphasize the relationship between historical movements and the present, specifically addressing the exploitation of Chinese immigrants and its broader critique of capitalism. While the public artist-in-residence Irving House, she continued to elaborate on heritage and its potential reorientation towards a decolonial process, drawing from her research on the labour and exploitation of Chinese individuals in Canada.

Wang has participated in numerous residencies, including the Similkameen Artist Residency, ArtStarts, Artscape Gibraltar, Artists for Kids with the North Vancouver School District, Willapa Bay AIR, Good Hart and the Wassaic Project. She has also been recognized with grants from the Vancouver Foundation, BC Arts Council, SSHRC and the Canada Council for the Arts.. Her work is in the collection of Canada Council for Arts' Art Bank.

== Exhibitions ==
2024: Spotlight: Janet Wang, Vancouver Art Gallery

2023: To Exit is to Enter, Evergreen Gallery, Coquitlam

2023: Peep Show, Malaspina Printmakers, Vancouver

2023: Ports of Entry, Sunshine Coast Arts Council, Sechelt

2014: Archetypical, Seymour Art Gallery, North Vancouver

2007: Inside Out (with Gwenessa Lam) Richmond Art Gallery, Richmond

== Public art projects ==
2023: Irving House Public Art, artist-in-residence, City of New Westminster

2022: Holding Pattern, City Centre Canada Line Station with City of Vancouver Public Art Program

2020: Four Seasons of Movement, Clement Track and Field, City of Richmond
