= Emily Carr University Library =

University Library

Ron Burnett Library
- 49.26726°N 123.09225°W
- Location: Canada
- Type: Academic

Collection
- Items collected: 60000

Other information
- Employees: 14
- Website: www.ecuad.ca/library

The Emily Carr University Library, also known as the Ron Burnett Library + Learning Commons, is an academic library focusing on art and design-related material located at the Emily Carr University of Art and Design Great Northern Way campus. The library is named after Ron Burnett, former university president. As of 2019, library is fine-free.

== History ==
The first mention of the library was in art periodicals from 1926, following the establishment of the Vancouver School of Decorative Arts and Applied Arts in October 1925.

The library's collection expanded throughout the early 1930s and became known as a valuable art reference library. The collection included works of fine art, design, and criticism of the arts along with general works in history, philosophy and the social sciences. The library collection began using the Dewey Decimal System, but later adopted the Library of Congress Classification system.

In 1956, the institution hired the first librarian Olga Laing, who held the position until 1960. Ken Chamberlain began his duty as the first professional librarian in 1979, and was appointed Head Librarian in the same year.

As the Vancouver School of Art evolved into Emily Carr College of Art by 1980, the library divided and formed two distinct libraries. The Audiovisual Library was established as an offshoot of the main print library as a means to handle the library collection's accumulation of audiovisual material. Although the libraries were situated next to each other, their transactions were handled separately. A second librarian, Shannon Ricketts was hired to manage the audiovisual collections. As of 1986, the Audiovisual Library cataloged 70,000 slides, as well as video tapes, audio tapes and films.

In 1993, the print library and the audiovisual library merged into one library space. As the institution obtained degree-granting authority in 1995, the library was able to expand its collections, develop specialized collections and establish an endowment fund.

== Learning Commons ==
Located in the library, the Learning Commons is the primary learning hub of the university. The space promotes a culture of research and facilitates learning through engagement with library materials, technology and dialogue.

Within the Learning Commons is an area designated to environment sustainability resources, including books and DVDS, binoculars, field guides, a waterproof birding backpack and recycling bins designated to batteries and soft plastics. This area also houses a seed library, a collage materials cart and a supplies swap, a space where the university community can donate art and design supplies to be reused.

The library offers various services and resources for student, faculty, and staff use, such as exhibition space, study rooms, computers and printers.

=== Artists' Book Room ===
The Artists’ Books Room contains the library's unique collection of artists’ books. The collection prioritizes conceptual artists’ books from the 1960s to present, including a vast representation of works derived from the avant-garde movements of Fluxus, Conceptual and Performance art. The artists’ books in the collection are diverse in their production approaches, from self-published artists’ books to hand-printed limited editions to more formal, hardcover publications.

=== University Archives ===
The Emily Carr University Archives serve to document and preserve material concerning the history of the institution. It acquires historical records and private papers of its faculties, alumni and governing bodies. Its holdings consist of publications, course-related material, textual records, audio and visual recordings, and photographs dating from 1925 to present.

In 2019, an archivist was hired.
