= Sweet Summer Pow Wow =

- Theatrical release poster
- Directed by: Darrell Dennis
- Screenplay by: Darrell Dennis; Katya Gardner
- Produced by: Harold C. Joe; Leslie D. Bland
- Starring: Joshua Odjick; Tatyana Rose Baptiste; Graham Greene
- Cinematography: Daniel Carruthers
- Edited by: Gavin Andrews
- Music by: Wayne Lavallee
- Production company: Orca Cove Media
- Release date: February 14, 2025 (VFF)
- Running time: 92 minutes
- Country: Canada
- Language: English

Sweet Summer Pow Wow is a 2025 Canadian romantic drama film, directed by Darrell Dennis. The film stars Joshua Odjick and Tatyana Rose Baptiste as Riley and Jinny, a pair of Indigenous Canadian young adults who meet and fall in love on the summer pow wow circuit, and try to build a relationship amid the challenges in their lives that threaten to keep them apart.

The cast also includes Graham Greene (in one of his final film appearances during his lifetime), Tanis Parenteau, Lisa C. Ravensbergen, Joel Montgrand, Taylor Kinequon, Trevor Carroll, Nick Dangeli and Tyler Peters in supporting roles.

The film was shot in summer 2023, principally around Duncan, British Columbia.

The film premiered at the 2025 Victoria Film Festival, where it was the winner of the Audience Favourite Feature award.
