= Julie Andreyev =

Canadian artist

- Born: 1962 (age 62–63); Burnaby, British Columbia, Canada
- Education: Diploma of Fine Arts, Emily Carr University of Art + Design, Master of Arts, Simon Fraser University
- Known for: Multidisciplinary artist
- Notable work: Animal Lover, Vegan Congress, Scratch Theremin, *glisten) HIVE, Rockstar

Julie Andreyev (born in 1962) is a Vancouver-based multidisciplinary artist whose practice explores themes of animal agency and consciousness. Her ongoing Animal Lover work explores nonhuman animal agency and creativity through modes of interspecies collaboration and aleatoric methods. The Animal Lover projects seek to contribute towards an ethic of compassion and regard for the intrinsic worth of other-than-human individuals. She was born in Burnaby, British Columbia.

== Education ==
Andreyev received her Diploma of Fine Arts degree from the Emily Carr University of Art + Design in 1988. She received a Master of Arts degree from the Simon Fraser University in 1999. She completed her PhD at Simon Fraser University in 2017 where her research examined compassion as a means for improved human awareness and relationship with more-than-human worlds.

== Career ==
Julie Andreyev is currently an associate professor at the Emily Carr University of Art + Design, and Artistic Director of Interactive Futures.

Her work has been shown across Canada, in the US, Europe and Japan in galleries and festivals such as the Peabody Essex Museum, the Vancouver Art Gallery, SIGGRAPH, Vancouver 2010 Cultural Olympiad, Viper, CHI, Japan Media Arts Festival, Digital Art Weeks, and Nuit Blanche.

== Art ==
Andreyev's art is concerned with issues surrounding new media, social media, technology and human/nonhuman relationships. The Animal Lover projects are often produced in collaboration with companion dogs Tom and Sugi where respect, fun and challenge are employed in the process. The dogs participate directly in the research and content creation of the work by suggesting ideas for projects and by determining the material for production. Also, aleatoric and improvisational methods are used that provide for a chance, open-ended expectation, surprise and learning.

Her work is support by The Canada Council for the Arts, The British Columbia Arts Council, Foreign Affairs Canada, and the Social Sciences and Humanities Research Council of Canada (SSHRC).

The following are some examples of her work.

=== Vegan Congress ===
Andreyev is founding member of the Vegan Congress, an activist group that creates relational projects to help develop discourse and practical ethics and provides events and information about vegan practice. One of the objectives of the project is to make ethical practice more visible within the community.

=== Scratch Theremin ===
For Scratch Theremin, Andreyev works with canine Tom using interactive software and a theremin to produce a collaborative improvisational interspecies performance. The aim of the project is to advance methods of improvisation and active listening, proposing live audio soundscapes that mesh canine sounds with electroacoustic practice. In the process of developing this performance, a custom built theremin, that incorporates a rug as an interface, was created to allow Tom to use scratch and digging gestures to create sound, accompanied by a diverse range of vocalization. These studio performances are audio recorded for use later in the live performance where they are remixed into a new experimental improvisational soundscape. Andreyev accompanies Tom's vocals and rhythms with her own live theremin and software performance.

=== *glisten) HIVE ===
*glisten) HIVE is a digital media project commissioned by 'CODE Live 2' for the Vancouver 2010 Cultural Olympiad, in which Twitter posts about animal consciousness were visualized in a real-time exhibition space. The collective online communication from participants were visualized as emergent swarms of text, and incorporated a soundscape of vocalizations from Andreyev's dog, Tom.

=== Rockstar ===
For this video work, Andreyev uses audio and visual representations of her canine companion Tom to speculate on his subjective and emotional experience traveling in a car by examining the notion that a canine's sense of smell is a locus for heightened sensitivity and empirical intelligence. The visuals refer to a psychedelic experience, metaphorically representing Tom's experience. The visuals are accompanied by a soundscape constructed from studio recordings of Tom's voice and car engine sounds to create connotative rhythmic and harmonic modes.

=== Tom and Sugi Blog / @Tom_and_Sugi ===
The Tom and Sugi Blog and @Tom_and_Sugi are social media projects, maintained as part of Andreyev's ongoing interspecies collaborative Animal Lover projects, in which animal consciousness and creativity is explored through compassionate means of interactive installation, video and social media. The projects use a Twitter feed to represent the first person point of view of the canines Tom and Sugi and their everyday activities. The blog represents a human reflection on the subjective experience of the canines in their relationship to the artist.

=== Bird Park Survival Station ===
The Bird Park Survival Station is a multi-species climate emergency project where Andreyev with team researches ways to improve local habitats by analyzing the needs and activities of local birds residing on her rooftop garden called The Park through computer vision and sound systems. The project have been publicized through several Bird Park videos as well as various publications including Lessons from a Multispecies Art Studio: Uncovering Ecological Understanding & Biophilia Through Creative Reciprocity.

=== Branching Songs ===
Branching Songs is a media, sound and performance project drawing attention to the climate emergency, wildlife and habitat loss. Through collaborative research, the Branching Songs team experimented in multispecies collaboration with trees and forests, using sound and new media technologies to support creative and careful interaction. The research generated new methods and techniques for working creatively with trees and forest ecologies resulting in media and sound art creations as well as workshops. Since inception, the project has expanded beyond collaboration with upcoming art events including an exhibition, performances, and several workshops scheduled to take place in Vancouver and on the Sunshine Coast—a coastal region 70km north of Vancouver that has unique intact forests including endangered ones—in the spring and summer of 2023.

== Selected exhibitions ==
2010

- Passages, Art Gallery of Mississauga, Mississauga, ON (solo)
- CUE: Artists' Videos, Vancouver Art Gallery, Vancouver, BC, curated by Daina Augaitis and Christopher Eamon
- Code Live 2, commissioned by Cultural Olympiad Digital Edition, Vancouver, BC

2011

- Interactive Futures '11: Animal Influence, Vancouver
- Random Elements – a Celebration of Iannis Xenakis, Vancouver New Music, Vancouver
- Tracing Home, SIGGRAPH 2011 Art Gallery, Vancouver, BC
- Signal & Noise Festival, VIVO, Vancouver, BC
- User in Flux, CHI Workshop 2011, Vancouver, BC

2012

- Taking Time, Surrey Urban Screen, Surrey Art Gallery, Surrey, BC
- Information, Ecology, Wisdom, The 3rd Art and Science International Exhibition, Beijing
- performance, platform. body affects, Sophiensaele, Berlin
- Vanimaux II, Remington/Gam Gallery, Vancouver
- Facing the Animal, OR Gallery, Vancouver
- Vancouver Experimental Theremin Orchestra, Utopia Festival, W2, Vancouver

2013

- Beyond Human: Artist – Animal Collaborations, Peabody Essex Museum, Salem, Mass.
- 2000 Meilen Unter Dem Meer, Vancouver Experimental Theremin Orchestra, VIVO, Vancouver

== Awards and grants ==
- Doctoral Award, Social Sciences and Humanities Research Council of Canada
- Provost's Prize of Distinction, Simon Fraser University, Burnaby
- Special Graduate Entrance Award, Graduate Studies, Simon Fraser University, Burnaby
- Travel Grant, The Canada Council for the Arts
- New Media and Audio Art Production Grant, The Canada Council for the Arts
- Public Outreach: Summer Institute, Workshop and Conference Grant, Social Sciences and Humanities Research Council of Canada
- Professional Project Assistance for Media Arts Organizations, British Columbia Arts Council
- Image, Text, Sound and Technology: Summer Institute, Workshop, Conference Grant, Social Sciences and Humanities Research Council of Canada
- Visual and Media Arts Grant, Arts Promotion Division, Foreign Affairs Canada
- Project Assistance For Media Artists, British Columbia Arts Council
- Project Assistance for Visual Artists, British Columbia Arts Council
- Strategic Research Grant, Social Sciences and Humanities Research Council of Canada
- BAFTA (British Academy of Film and Television Arts) Interactive Award (Nominee)
- MAD '03NET Project Award, 2nd International Meeting of Experimental Arts in Madrid
- Creation/Production Grant, The Canada Council for the Arts
- Graduate Fellowship, Graduate Liberal Studies, Simon Fraser University

== Publications ==
- Andreyev, Julie. Lessons from a Multispecies Art Studio: Uncovering Ecological Understanding & Biophilia Through Creative Reciprocity. Intellect Books, 2021.
- "Why Look at Animals in Landscapes?", catalogue essay in The Reflexive Animal, SFU Gallery, Simon Fraser University, Burnaby, Canada. 2012
- "Endangered Whales and Dolphins Affected by Tankers", The Common Sense Canadian, July 16, 2012
- "Dog Voice: A Memoir", Interactive Futures '11: Animal Influence, Antennae, Issue 21, 2012
- "People Respond to Images that Provide Hope", interview with Sam Easterson, Interactive Futures '11: Animal Influence, Antennae, Issue 22, 2012
- "Wait", Leonardo, Special Issue Volume 44, Number 4, ACM SIGGRAPH, MIT Press, Leonardo/ISAST, Cambridge, Mass., USA
- "Animal Lover: Aria", Art Catalogue/Computational Aesthetics 2009, Eurographics Association, Germany.
- "Four Wheel Drift," (with Petra Watson), Transdisciplinary Digital Art: Sound, Vision and the New Screen, Randy Adams, Steve Gibson, Stefan Muller-Arisona (Eds), Springer, Berlin.
- "I Want More Life Fucker!" catalogue essay for exhibition Welcome to the Desert of the Real, Concourse Gallery, Emily Carr Institute of Art, Design & Media, Vancouver.
- "The Last Seduction: Theorizing the Cinematic Female Killer", Foundational Narratives: Proceedings from the Foundational Narratives Interdisciplinary Graduate Student Conference, Stephen Collis and Sharon-Ruth Alker, eds., Simon Fraser University, Vancouver, BC
- "The Blasphemous Image: Donna Haraway's Cyborg Manifesto and Representations of the Cyborg in Popular Film", The Journal of Graduate Liberal Studies, Volume III, Number 2, Spring, 1998, R. Barry Levis ed., NC State University, Raleigh, USA.
