= Halm =

Halm is a surname of Anglo-Saxon origin. Notable people with the name include:

- Alfred Halm (1861–1951), Austrian screenwriter
- Friedrich Halm (1806-1871), Austrian dramatist
- Günter Halm (1922-2017), German soldier
- Harry Halm (1901–1980), German actor
- Heinz Halm (born 1942), German scholar
- Jakob Karl Ernst Halm (1866-1944), German physicist
- Karl Felix Halm (1809-1882), German scholar
- Peter Halm (1854–1923), German etcher
- Renée Van Halm (born 1949), Dutch-Canadian artist
- Teo Halm (born 1999), American actor
- W. M. Q. Halm (1902–?), Ghanaian economist
