= Unit/Pitt Gallery =

Coordinates: 49°16′06″N 123°10′17″W

Unit/Pitt Gallery is a gallery based in Vancouver, Canada. As an artist-run centre, their mission is to "empower collective, cumulative action through art, resistance, advocacy, and critical awareness-raising by supporting emerging artists and their diverse communities of practice."

== History ==
Unit/Pitt Gallery was previously named Helen Pitt Gallery. It was founded in 1975 by students of Vancouver School of Art. The gallery was named after a philanthropist who had established scholarship for students of the school The gallery's original location was 163 West Pender Street, which was across the street from the school. The gallery initially operated using funds from student membership fees raised by the student society. When Vancouver School of Art rebranded to become Emily Carr University and moved to Granville Island, the gallery became an independent entity. In 2023, Unit/Pitt gallery moved to their current location at 2954 West 4th Ave. The artist Dana Claxton have worked and curated a number of events and exhibitions at the gallery. Alison Bosley is the current Executive Director of the gallery.

== Programming ==
The mission of Unit/Pitt Gallery is to support emerging artists and the range of programming at the gallery over the years reflect this mission. The gallery exhibited the work of Share Coursaut in May 1978, who was a graduate of Vancouver School of Art. In March 1986, the artist Burrell Swartz exhibited his oil paintings at the gallery. On November 1983, the gallery held an exhibition titled "Sexuality and Seeing" curated by Gary Coward. On September 1989, the gallery re-enacted the courtroom of the Gitskan and Wet'suwet'en land title fight with the provincial and federal government in an exhibition titled "Courtroom 53: Gitskan and Wet'suwet'en Land Title Action".On October 1, 1992, Dana Claxton and Mike Macdonald curated an event called "First Ladies", which was a group exhibition of contemporary and traditional art by Indigenous women. Dana Claxton also curated an exhibition of Indigenous conceptual artists titled "Neo Nativist: A laboratory of Contemporary Native Artists" in October 1991. In May 1994, the gallery hosted jazz musicians, including New York quintet Lost Tribe as part of the Jazz festival. In August 2006, the cartoonist Amy Lockhart exhibited her work at the gallery. In 2007, the gallery became one of the hosts of LIVE Performance art Bienalle.
