= Dana Claxton =

Indigenous Canadian filmmaker, photographer and performance artist

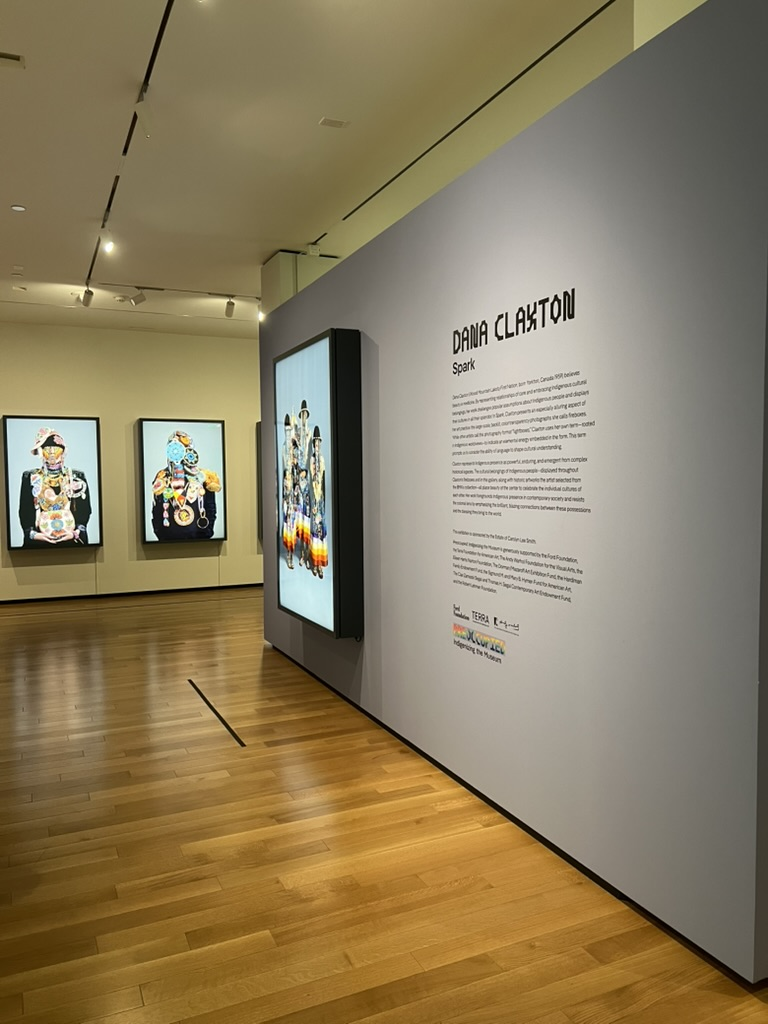
- Title wall of Dana Claxton: Spark Solo Exhibition at the Baltimore Museum of Art, 2024
- Born: 1959 (age 66–67); Yorkton, Saskatchewan, Canada
- Known for: Film, performance, and photography
- Website: danaclaxton.com

Dana Claxton (born 1959) is a Hunkpapa Lakota filmmaker, photographer, and performance artist. Her work looks at stereotypes, historical context, and gender studies of Indigenous peoples of the Americas, specifically those of the First Nations. In 2007, she was awarded an Eiteljorg Fellowship for Native American Fine Art.

== Background ==
=== Heritage and early life ===
Claxton's family are descendants of Sitting Bull's followers who escaped persecution by the U.S. Army in 1876 after the Battle of the Little Bighorn, heading to Canada. Growing up in Moose Jaw, Saskatchewan, she is the youngest of four siblings. Her family's reserve, Wood Mountain Lakota First Nation, is located in Southwest Saskatchewan.

=== Teaching and video production ===
Claxton co-founded the Indigenous Media Arts Group and has taught at the Emily Carr University of Art and Design in Vancouver. In 2003, she served as the Global Television Chair at the University of Regina where she taught at the school of journalism. In 2010, she served as Simon Fraser University's Ruth Wynn Woodward Chair in Women's Studies.

She has worked closely with numerous Canadian and First Nations organizations, such as the National Film Board of Canada, Canadian Broadcasting Corporation, among others. She served as director and producer for 52 episodes of the Canadian program Wakanheja, a First Nations oriented children's program and 26 episodes of ArtZone, an art show for teenagers. She also served as producer and a storyteller for First Stories-VTV, a program about the Aboriginal population of Vancouver. Dana Claxton has curated for Unit/Pitt Gallery.

=== Current life ===
When not creating art, Claxton serves on panel discussions, as an art juror, curator, as well as a mentor for young and emerging artists. Claxton lives in Vancouver, British Columbia, and is a faculty member at the University of British Columbia. She previously studied acting at HB Studio in New York City. She received a master's degree in Liberal Studies in 2007 from Simon Fraser University where she was made Ruth Wynn Woodward Endowed Chair in 2009–2010.

== Artistic career ==
I'm influenced by my own experience as a Lakota woman, as a Canadian, a mixed blood Canadian, and then my own relationship to the natural and supernatural world. So taking that whole bundle of experiences, it all goes in to the artwork, I think that's where the multi-layering comes in because I've had a very multi-layered life. And it's all those experiences that go in to the work. – Dana Claxton, 2007

Claxton combines her own world-view with Indigenous issues from the past and present. She investigates concerns about colonization, body imagery, beauty, politics, spirituality and the iconography of Native peoples and how it is placed in popular culture. Through video, photography and conceptual projects Claxton strives to blend traditional experiences and environments within contemporary spaces

=== Video ===
Claxton's video creations started in the early 1990s. Experimenting with video in works such as Grant Her Restitution (1991) and I Want To Know Why (1994) where she explores the effects of colonialism on Canadian women. Evolving her artistic goals further, starting in 1996 with The Red Paper, Claxton proceeded to attempt to "bring spirit into the gallery space". Through the blending of the sacred and secular she incorporates traditional objects and symbols of Lakota spirituality in contemporary spaces and environs.

Her numerous video projects have been shown in more than 15 countries.

=== Photography ===
In the series On to the Red Road (2006), Claxton brings together five photographs to take a look on femininity and clothing. Through the series Claxton is showing a model wearing traditional regalia slowly removing articles of clothing to reveal a sexy outfit, bringing questions of sexuality and gender bias to light.

Paint Up (2009) features portraits of Joseph Paul, a ceremonial Salish Black Face dancer and Pow-wow dancer living on the Musqueam Indian Reserve. Up close, large scale colour portraits of Paul with his face painted, these works have been described as "imposing images, striking and cool, throw down a challenge to the sterile, nonspiritual, materialistic view of contemporary life."

Newer works such as the Mustang Suite take a vivid look at the meanings and stereotypes behind Indianess, specifically Black Elk's vision of the Horse Dance. A group of large C-prints, the mustang represents freedom and mobility, and is not necessarily displayed as a horse. Daddy's Gotta New Ride shows an Indigenous man in a black suit with face paint and braided hair, standing next to a red Ford Mustang. Baby Girls Gotta Mustang features twin girls in red dresses and mukluks on bicycles. Another in the series, Mama Has a Pony Girl…Named History and Sets Her Free, shows a medicine woman with her arms outstretched and a Caucasian woman danced like a burlesque pony girl. The image is meant to support Aboriginal women who wish to release themselves from the binds of history, specifically one filled with sexualized stereotypes. Other images in the series are large scale reflections on the Indigenous community in a contemporary world.

Claxton has also focused on the American Indian Movement which features blown up black-and-white photos of declassified government documents about the at times controversial civil rights organization. The documents were collected when Claxton lived in New York City in the late 1980s and early 1990s, from the New York Public Library. The reporting documents have many blacked out words, notorious of other government documents from the FBI and related organizations.

Claxton's photography has been featured in the book #NotYourPrincess Voices of Native American Women (2017), which was edited by Lisa Charleyboy and Mary Beth Leatherdale. Included in her art piece Onto the Red Road, Claxton states that "[it] is about transformation, spirituality, and objectification of Indigenous [women]." When asked "what it means to be an NDN woman," Claxton cites "care for your family and community with generosity, courage, wisdom, and fortitude."

Claxton's solo exhibition “Dana Claxton: Spark" opened at the Baltimore Museum of Art in 2024, as part of the larger exhibition Preoccupied: Indigenizing the Museum. The exhibition featured LED large-scale, backlit, colour photographs that she refers to as "fireboxes" as a play on the term "lightboxes" to described the energy in her work with a nod to her indigenous roots. These fireboxes she references as a testament to the beauty and resilience of Indigenous women.

=== Major works ===
==== Buffalo Bone China ====
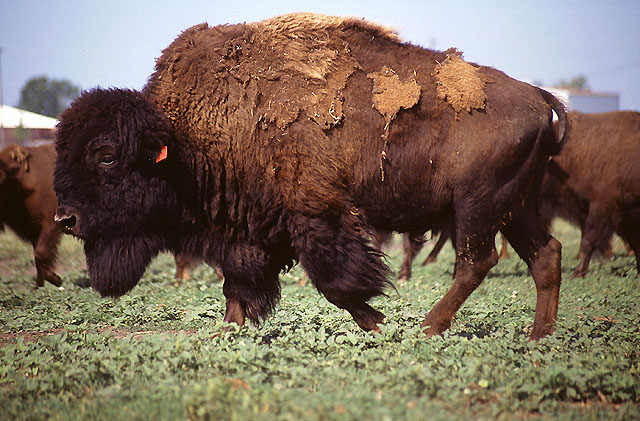
An American bison

In Buffalo Bone China Claxton blends performance art, found objects and video to dissect the effects upon First Nations peoples due to policies from colonial Great Britain regarding the American bison. Bison were slaughtered and their bones crushed and exported to England to make bone china.

In the performance Claxton smashes pieces of china and makes four bundles, placing the bundles in a sacred circle while a video of buffalo plays in the background. "Feeling the loss of the buffalo, the backbone of Plains spirituality and sustenance, the artist uses a rubber mallet to destroy plates and bowls. The breaking of the china refers to the use of buffalo bones in the making of bone china during the period of exploitation and decimation of the buffalo." Claxton only smashed British bone China.

Buffalo Bone China was exhibited at the MacKenzie Art Gallery in Canada from 23 May 2009 to 13 September 2009, as well as the Vancouver Art Gallery from 27 October 2018 to 3 February 2019.

==== Sitting Bull and the Moose Jaw Sioux ====
Created in 2003 and displayed at the 17th Biennale of Sydney, Sitting Bull and the Moose Jaw Sioux brings together landscape scenery, interviews and images to examine the founding of the Moose Jaw camp, the camp founded by Sitting Bull after exodus out of the United States after the Battle of Little Bighorn. The piece, originally commissioned by the Moose Jaw Art Gallery, features four video screens, archival images and interviews from the camps original inhabitants, as well as footage of the site.

== Awards ==
In 2019, the Hnatyshyn Foundation awarded Claxton their prize for outstanding achievement by a mid-career Canadian artist. In 2019 Claxton received the YWCA Women of Distinction Award in the category of Arts, Culture and Design. Claxton won the 2020 Governor General's Award for Artistic Achievement in the Visual Arts Category. Also in 2020, Claxton won the Scotiabank Photography Award.

== Selected public collections ==
- Canada Council Art Bank
- Colby College Museum of Art, Maine;
- Robert McLaughlin Gallery, Oshawa;
- Vancouver Art Gallery
- Winnipeg Art Gallery;

== Exhibitions ==
- Dana Claxton: The Bead, 2026, Surrey Art Gallery
- Dana Claxton: Spark, 2024, Baltimore Museum of Art
- Time and Tide Flow Wide, 2023, Colby College Museum of Art
- Fringing the Cube, 2018–2019, Vancouver Art Gallery
- Solo show, 2010, Biennale of Sydney
- Native Visuality, 2009, C.N. Gorman Museum
- New Work, 2009, University of Lethbridge
- Steeling the Gaze, 2009, National Gallery of Canada
- Solo show, 2007, Montreal Biennale
- Eiteljorg Fellowship for Native American Fine Art, 2007, Eiteljorg Museum
- Solo show, 2006, Biennale d’art contemporain du Havre
- Solo show, 2005, Art Star Biennale
- Gatherings: Aboriginal Art from the Collection of the Winnipeg Art Gallery, 2004, Guangdong Museum of Art
- Topographies, 1996, Vancouver Art Gallery
