= Angela Grossmann =

Canadian artist (born 1955)

Angela Grossmann (born 1955) is a Canadian artist, known for her oil paintings and mixed media collages. Her works range from simplistic drawings to rendering of the human body by layering torn and manipulated photos of body parts.

== Early life and education ==
Grossman was born in London, England. She graduated from Emily Carr College (now University) of Art + Design in 1985. That year her artwork was included in the Vancouver Art Gallery's exhibition of "Young Romantic" painters with Attila Richard Lukacs and Vicky Marshall. She earned an MFA at Concordia University.

== Career ==
Grossman taught at Ottawa University, and then returned to Vancouver in 1997 to paint and to teach at Emily Carr. She has exhibited widely across Canada, the United States and Europe and her work is in many public and private collections.

Grossmann's art often portrays subjects of displacement and social margins through the use of collaged and transferred discarded materials. In an early series titled Affaires d'Enfants (1987), Grossman created paintings on the insides of old suitcase. In 1991, her exhibition (Sign)ifying the END of the (Second) 2nd World War, included photographs, found in second-hand shops, of European children. Correction(s) (1999) consisted of mug shots of prisoners in the British Columbia Penitentiary and the records of their crime and daily habits while incarcerated during the 1940s. My Vocation (1999), presented the human figure graphically sketched and enlarged, using letters, photographs, addresses, envelopes, postage and cancellation marks. Alpha Girls (2004), Campbell, Deborah. Paper Dolls (2006) and Swagger (2007) portrayed themes of social status, fashion and identity in teen girls and boys.

In June 2006, she was included in a list of 100 artists who have most influenced students at eleven leading British art schools, including the Royal Academy, Slade and Royal College of Art. In 2006, she joined forces with Douglas Coupland, Graham Gillmore, Attila Richard Lukacs and Derek Root to create a large sculptural installation entitled "Vancouver School". Grossmann collaborates with this group on a regular basis for special projects.

In April 2012, Grossman mounted an exhibition titled, The Future is Female, an introspective look on the essence of being female. Her collages are edited photographs, keeping the heads of the figure untouched, but manipulating the limbs and torso for artistic effect. In combination with monochrome oil on vellum or mylar paintings of candid female subjects, she creates visually complex collages.

In 2015, her portraits of women, entitled "Models of Resistance", were exhibited at the Marion Scott Gallery.

Grossman is a co-founder of the Portfolio Prize Foundation, an organization which financially supports emerging artists.

== Solo exhibitions (selected) ==
- 1987 Affaires d'Enfants, Diane Farris Gallery
- 1989 Angela Grossmann: A Recent Survey, Simon Fraser Gallery, Simon Fraser University, Vancouver, BC
- 1999 Correction(s), Kamloops Art Gallery, Kamloops, BC
- 2004 Alpha Girls], Diane Farris, Vancouver, BC
- 2006 Paper Dolls, Diane Farris, Vancouver, BC
- 2007 Swagger], Diane Farris, Vancouver, BC
- 2010 Three Thistles and Other Works, Galerie D'Este, Montreal, QC
- 2012 Art Gallery of Calgary, curated by Marrianne, Elder
- 2012 Winsor Gallery, Vancouver, BC
- 2023 With Themselves, Equinox Gallery, Vancouver

== Collections ==
- ABN AMRO International Bank, Amsterdam, Holland
- Art Gallery of Greater Victoria, Victoria, BC
- Appleton Museum of Art, Ocala, Florida
- Canada Council Art Bank, Ottawa, ON
- Canadiana Fund Heritage Art Collection, Ottawa, ON
- Canadian Postal Museum, Ottawa, ON
- Federation CJA, Montreal, QC
- Kamloops Art Gallery, Kamloops, BC
- Museum Abteiberg, Monchengladbach, Germany
- Seymour Collection, Vancouver, BC
- Simon Fraser University, Burnaby, BC
- Southern Alberta Art Gallery, Lethbridge, AB
- University of Victoria, Victoria, BC
- Vancouver Art Gallery, Vancouver, BC
