= Stephen Mamber =

American film scholar and emeriti

- Occupations: Film scholar, emeritus professor
- Employer: University of California, Los Angeles (UCLA)
- Known for: Cinema and digital media studies
- Title: Professor Emeritus

Stephen Mamber is an American film scholar and emeritus professor, specializing in cinema and digital media studies. He is a Research Professor Emeritus in the Cinema and Media Studies Program of the Department of Film, Television, and Digital Media at the University of California, Los Angeles (UCLA). Mamber has contributed to the study of film theory, visual analysis, and digital media applications in cinema studies.

== Education and career ==
Mamber received his undergraduate degree from the University of California, Berkeley, where he double majored in mathematics and dramatic art. He earned his Ph.D. from the University of Southern California. Additionally, he was a Fellow at the American Film Institute Center for Advanced Film Studies and is a founding member of the Los Angeles Film Critics Association. He was a film critic on KPFK, Pacifica Radio, where one of his programs received an Associated Press Golden Mike Award.

Throughout his academic career, Mamber has held faculty positions at various institutions, including the Georgia Institute of Technology School of Literature, Communication, and Culture, the University of Southern California, Art Center College of Design in Pasadena, and the Centre for Digital Media in Vancouver.

== Research and contributions ==
Mamber has been actively involved in digital media research, particularly in the use of technology for film analysis. His work has been supported by grants from the MacArthur Foundation and the Intel Research Council. He has also been a Visiting Research Scientist at the IBM T.J. Watson Research Center and has served as a National IBM Consulting Scholar.

His research includes the study of film narrative structures, experimental approaches to film analysis, and the development of digital tools for film studies. His book Cinema Verite in America: Studies in Uncontrolled Documentary (MIT Press) is a contribution to documentary film studies.

== Digital media and applications ==
Mamber has developed digital applications focused on film analysis, including:

- ClipNotes / ClipNoter – A free application for iPad, Windows, and Mac designed for film study and presentation, allowing users to annotate and organize film segments.
- Who Shot Liberty Valance? – An experimental app analyzing John Ford's The Man Who Shot Liberty Valance (1962), featuring annotated film segments and 3D models.
- 7 Thursdays: Looking at Brief Encounter – A study of the 1946 David Lean film Brief Encounter, examining its time structure and spatial elements.
- The Seventh Race: Kubrick at the Starting Gate – A study of Stanley Kubrick's The Killing (1955), analyzing its non-linear storytelling through interactive elements.

== Publications ==
- Cinema Verite in America: Studies in Uncontrolled Documentary
- In Search of Radical Metacinema: De Palma, Allen, Scorsese, and Kubrick
- A Clockwork Orange
- Films Beget Digital Media
- Kubrick in Space
- Marey, the Analytic, and the Digital
- Narrative Mapping
- Space-Time Mappings as Database Browsing Tools
- The Television Films of Alfred Hitchcock
- Hitchcock: The Conceptual and the Pre-Digital
- LaserDiscs: On the Way to a Digital Video Future
- The Franchise Era: Managing Media in the Digital Economy (co-editor)

== Recent work ==
In 2021, Mamber undertook an online project titled Frederick Wiseman: A Journal, in which he watched and wrote about all the available films by documentary filmmaker Frederick Wiseman over the course of three months.
