= Jude Griebel =

Canadian sculptor

Jude Griebel (born 1978) is a Canadian sculptor, working between Alberta, Canada and Brooklyn, New York. Griebel creates intensively detailed figurative sculptures and drawings that visualize our entanglement with the surrounding world.

== Early life and education ==
Griebel was born in Ottawa, Canada. He received a BFA from the Emily Carr University of Art and Design in 2004 and an MFA in Sculpture and Ceramics from Concordia University, in 2014.

== Work ==
In his elaborate sculptures, Jude Griebel merges human forms with those of animals, insects, architecture, and the natural environment. These hybrid bodies function as stages for productive and destructive events. While addressing instances of human behavior in a broader context, these works also function as metaphors for the development and destruction of the self. In his essay "Charmed Beginnings", scholar and art historian Tammer El-Sheikh writes:

His dioramas dissolve the outlines of humans in the landscape and offer instead the expressive parts of them. The figure of the human that results is an emergent one, groping and exploring but faced at every turn with environmentally imposed limits. Deleuze and Guattari breach the boundary between natural and human- made realms by identifying linkages between them. If we turn to Griebel's dioramas we see these schemas expanded to describe interactions between humans, their primitive and sophisticated tools, and the natural environments those tools shape.

Jude has attended Yaddo and his work has been supported by the Pollock Krasner Foundation.

== Exhibitions ==
Griebel has been extensively featured in exhibitions at cultural institutions across Canada, including:

- Future Station: 2015 Alberta Biennial of Contemporary Art, Art Gallery of Alberta, 2015
- FLUX: Responding to Head and Neck Cancer, McMullen Gallery, 2017
- Illuminated Collapse, Nickle Galleries at the University of Calgary, 2018
- Art Gallery of Alberta, 2021
- Illuminated Collapse, Kenderdine Art Gallery, 2021
- Insect as Idea, McIntosh Gallery at the Western University, 2022
