= Lisa C. Ravensbergen =

First Nations multi-disciplinary artist and writer

Lisa C. Ravensbergen is a multi-disciplinary artist and writer of Ojibwe/Swampy Cree and English/Irish descent, based in Vancouver, British Columbia. Ravensbergen is a Jessie-nominated actor, dramaturge, director and dancer. Ravensbergen is an Associate Artist with Full Circle First Nations Performance Group and Playwright-in-Residence with Delinquent Theatre. She holds undergraduate degrees from Trinity Western University and Simon Fraser University and an MA in Cultural Studies from Queens University.

== Theatre career ==
In 2019, Ravensbergen wrote a play titled The Seventh Fire produced by Delinquent Theatre and in association with the Neworld Theatre company. The Seventh Fire looks at sourcing traditional, oral Anishinaabe stories and societal roles as a way to explore ceremony in the everyday. Set in the present, past, and future, it tells the story of a woman's return to the Ojibwe community she believes has rejected her. In 2018, she was featured in an experimental performance titled Hearing, finding, translating Kiyoko by Julie Tamiko Manning at the Tableau D'Hôte Theatre in Montreal, Quebec, as well as the Powell Street Festival in Vancouver, British Columbia. In March 2018, she directed a play titled Daughter Cafe, which took place at the Belfry Theatre, in Victoria, British Columbia. In 2017, she worked as dramaturge for the play titled In the Shadow of the Mountains by Valerie Sing Turner, which took place at Studio 1398, Festival House, in Vancouver, British Columbia. In 2009, she performed in the Western Canadian Theatre's production of The Ecstasy of Rita Joe, playing the name character Rita Joe.

== Artistic career ==
In June 2001, Ravensbergen co-curated the show Taking Stick Cabaret with Daina Warren at Grunt Gallery, in Vancouver, British Columbia. In September 2020, Ravensbergen was featured in Soundings: An Exhibition in Five Parts curated by Candice Hopkins and Dylan Robinson which exhibited at The Gund Gallery at Kenyon College in Gambier, Ohio, Agnes Etherington Art Centre, Kingston, Ontario, the Kitchener-Waterloo Art Gallery, Kitchener-Waterloo, the Morris and Helen Belkin Art Gallery, Vancouver, British Columbia, and Kamloops Art Gallery, Kamloops, British Columbia. In February 2021, Ravensbergen participated in an online group exhibition project titled PushOFF 2021: Speculative Futures in collaboration with Theatre Company and Company 605.

== Co-authored publications ==
- Marshall, Mariel and Lisa Cooke Ravensbergen. "The Doing that can Undo: Decolonizing the Performer-Audience Relationship in Lisa Cooke Ravensbergen's Citation." Canadian Theatre Review 179, (2019): 80–82.
- Robinson, Dylan, Kanonhsyonne Janice C. Hill, Armand Garnet Ruffo, Selena Couture, and Lisa Cooke Ravensbergen. "Rethinking the Practice and Performance of Indigenous Land Acknowledgement." Canadian Theatre Review 177, (2019): 20–30.

== Filmography ==
Year	Title	Role	Notes
2010	Shattered	Heather	TV series
2010	Craven	Rita	Short Film
2014	The Unauthorized Saved by the Bell Story	Hair Person	TV movie
2025	Sweet Summer Pow Wow	Nora	
