= How Images Think =

Book about new media by Ron Burnett

- Author: Ron Burnett
- Language: English
- Genre: Non-fiction
- Publisher: MIT Press
- Publication date: 2004
- Publication place: United States
- ISBN: 978-0-262-02549-2

How Images Think is a book about new media by Ron Burnett published by MIT Press in 2004.
