= Attila Richard Lukacs =

Canadian artist (born 1962)

Attila Richard Lukács
- Born: 1962 (age 63–64); Edmonton, Alberta, Canada
- Education: University of Victoria, Emily Carr Institute of Art and Design
- Known for: Painter

Attila Richard Lukács (born 1962) is a Canadian artist.

Lukács gained international attention via his E-werk series—a collection of very large figure paintings that he created in the 1980s and 1990s, while living in Berlin.

The paintings featured nude and semi-nude skinheads, who were depicted in heroic and classical poses in chiaroscuro, reminiscent of Renaissance art. The paintings were considered provocative due to their depictions of homosexuality, sadomasochism, and fascistic symbolism.

== Biography ==
Lukács was born in Edmonton, Alberta, and grew up in Calgary. He is the second of three sons born to Joseph and Helen Lukács. His parents fled Hungary in 1956. His father worked as a petroleum engineer.

Having shown an interest in art since he was a young child, Lukács was encouraged by his father to apply to the fine arts program at the University of Victoria. Lukács did not enjoy his time at the university and enrolled at the Emily Carr Institute of Art and Design in Vancouver in 1983. Later that same year, he had his first solo exhibition titled Prime Cuts, held at the Unit/Pitt Gallery in Vancouver. As described by Tom Barrett of the Vancouver Sun: "The front of the gallery was fixed up to imitate a butcher shop. Inside, thick paintings of raw, red hunks of meat hung from the walls."

In 1984, Lukács took part in Futura Bold, a joint exhibition with fellow Emily Carr attendees Angela Grossmann, Graham Gillmore and Derek Root. The following year the four artists' work, along with four other artists, was displayed at the Vancouver Art Gallery under the name Young Romantics.

Lukács graduated from Emily Carr in 1985 and moved to Berlin the following year. While living in Berlin, Lukács had a studio residency at the Künstlerhaus Bethanien, an old hospital that was converted into a collection of artist studio spaces. During this time he became interested in the skinhead subculture and used skinheads as models for his paintings, eventually socializing with and dressing like them. In a 1988 interview with Canadian Art magazine, Lukács said: "I definitely do not consider myself an official member of that society. I'm more like a voyeur."

Lukács work during his stay in Berlin was considered provocative because many of his paintings featured homoerotic and sadomasochistic motifs, mixed with military and fascistic symbolism. He drew inspiration in part from his childhood fascination with military cadets and memories of poring over military catalogues after having asked his father to send him to military school.

Lukács first exhibited his E-werk series in 1994, which consisted of six massive canvases that he had been created since 1986. The collection got its name from Lukacs' favourite Berlin nightclub (whose name is in turn the abbreviation of the German expression for a power plant.) The paintings depicted male figures in various poses, both classical and at times erotic, who also embody neo-Nazi esthetics and symbology, such as shaven heads, Doc Marten boots, bomber jackets, tattoos and swastikas. The collection garnered Lukács international attention and praise.

Lukács moved to New York in 1996 and held several shows at the Phyllis Kind Gallery. His 1999 exhibition, Arbor Vitae, featured a series of thirteen black-on-white renditions of a single tree and marked a dramatic departure from the style of his earlier works. Lukács did not find the success that he had hoped for on the New York art scene and suffered from a worsening addiction to methamphetamine. He left New York for Maui in 2001 to recover. While there, much of his work focused on paintings of flowers.

Lukács returned to Canada in late 2002. Drawing Out the Demons, a biographical documentary film about the artist was released in 2004. The film was nominated for two Gemini awards the following year in the categories of Best Direction in a Documentary Program, for director David Vaisbord, and Best Performing Arts Program or Series or Arts Documentary Program or Series, for producers Trish Dolman and Stephanie Symns. The documentary opens in the summer of 2001 and documents Lukács' journey from New York to addiction recovery in Maui, then on to Calgary and back to Vancouver.

The photographic exhibition Attila Polaroids: Attila Richard Lukács and Michael Morris premiered in 2008. It featured over 3,000 Polaroids taken by Lukács of the studio models that were used as figure studies for his paintings while living in Berlin and New York between 1986 and 1996. The collection was curated by artist Michael Morris, whose monograph accompanied the photographs on exhibition.

In the mid to late 2010s, Lukács' paintings were featured in the exhibitions Drama Queer: seducing social change and About Face: Stonewall, Revolt and New Queer Art, curated by American art historian Jonathan David Katz.

== Artistic style ==
Lukács' work of the 1980s and 1990s featured very large canvasses with thick applications of oil paint, along with other textural media such as tar, feathers, and gold leaf. Some of these canvasses were in the range of 13 feet high. The heroic and classical themes present in his work during his time in Berlin—along with his use of bold lighting, or chiaroscuro, to highlight the male form—prompted comparisons of Lukács' work to that of Rembrandt, Caravaggio and Goya.

His 1999 series, Arbor Vitae, featured a collection of black-on-white paintings of a single tree from a variety of perspectives. The paintings were a departure from his Berlin works and were based on the photographic work of Alexander Rodchenko, who was known for pointing his camera sharply downward or upwards when capturing subjects. In addition to his use of oil paint and tar, these paintings also featured applications of varathane and roofing cement.

His series Myths About my Garden from 1999 and Of Monkeys and Men from 2003 were both painted in a style influenced by Persian miniature and Indian miniature painting.

In the 2010s, Lukács began producing more abstract paintings as well as sculptural and installation artworks.

== Accolades ==
In 1990, Pamela Young of Maclean's magazine called Lukács "the most renowned Canadian artist of the under-30 generation."

In 1996, Michael Scott of the Vancouver Sun said of the E-werk collection: "Without a doubt, they establish Lukács as one of the three or four most important artists Canada has produced in the past 50 years."

In her 1999 book Canadian Art in the Twentieth Century, Canadian art historian Joan Murray described Lukács as "an important painter in Canada."

American art historian Jonathan David Katz has referred to Lukács as "one of the world's greatest living artists."

== Lukács' commentary on the homoerotic label ==
Journalists and critics have used the word homoerotic to described Lukács' art, particularly in reference to his paintings of the 1980s and 90s. Lukács commented on this descriptor in a 1988 interview with Canadian Art magazine:

I hate the term homo-erotic. It's a 19th-century or Victorian English term. As soon as you see a male nude in a painting, it's termed homo-erotic, but when you see a female nude in painting, it's never referred to as hetero-erotic. In my earlier works, like one of the big paintings shown at Mercer Union in Toronto, there was a definite so-called homo-erotic content. In the newer work I don't deal with that; what I'm trying to do now is deal with the male nude in the way classical nudes have always been dealt with—they don't have to have those sexual implications.

In a 1992 interview with Robert Enright of Border Crossings magazine, he said:

I've never really tried to play an important role in gay culture. As a matter of fact, I always used to steer people away from interpreting the painting as homoerotic because they were just normal to me. I expected people to see that. But in a funny way it is gotten important to me now.

Lukács said in a 2016 interview with the Vancouver Courier:

I think the idea of doing the gay subject matter and skinheads [was] to make people deal with it. Remember, it was when Reagan was denying AIDS. [This said], "We exist and you have to deal with us," and putting it in front of people’s faces in an art-historical context was a way for them to swallow it.

== Selected collections ==
Lukács' work has been collected by institutions such as the National Gallery of Canada, the Art Gallery of Ontario and the Vancouver Art Gallery. One of Lukacs' paintings is included in the Crown Collection, which consists of furniture, artwork, and decorative items used to furnish and decorate Canada's official residences.

Private collectors of his work include musician Elton John, film director Fred Schepisi and Canadian entrepreneur Salah Bachir.
