= Donald Jarvis =

Canadian artist (1923-2001)

Don Jarvis
- Born: Donald Alvin Jarvis; April 24, 1923; Vancouver, British Columbia
- Died: March 22, 2001 (aged 77); Sechelt, British Columbia
- Education: Vancouver School of Art (1941–1942) (1946–1948); Hans Hofmann, New York (1948)

Don Jarvis RCA (1923–2001) was a Canadian abstract painter.

== Career ==
Born in Vancouver in 1923, Don Jarvis took up drawing at an early age. An aspiring cartoonist as a teenager, Jarvis enrolled at the Vancouver School of Art in 1941 and was encouraged by his teachers, B.C. Binning and Jack Shadbolt to pursue fine art. He left after a year, but returned in 1946 and completed the course in 1948.

When he graduated in 1948, Jarvis won a scholarship. At the suggestion of Lawren Harris, he traveled to New York City to study under the abstract expressionist Hans Hofmann. His time in New York produced his acclaimed, newly rediscovered collection of New York Drawings. Jarvis returned to Vancouver in 1949 and became a drawing and painting instructor at the Vancouver School of Art in 1951, in 1961 becoming head of the department. He remained there for 36 years. He is known for his lyrical abstractions, and especially for his Encounter and Rain Forest series of the 1960s and 1970s. Jarvis began exhibiting in the annual B.C. Artists exhibitions at the Vancouver Art Gallery in 1946, and each year after that until 1958, as well as in 1960, 1963, and 1965. He was given solo exhibitions at the Vancouver Gallery in 1949, the Art Gallery of Greater Victoria, the Edmonton Art Gallery, and Simon Fraser University Gallery and participated in many group exhibitions His work is represented in the National Gallery of Canada, the Vancouver Art Gallery, the Winnipeg Art Gallery and elsewhere.

In 1961, he received a Canada Council Select Arts Fellowship and he was made a member of the Royal Canadian Academy of Arts in 1967. He was also a member of the Canadian Group of Painters and the British Columbia Group of Artists. In 1999, he said:

"I see the painter as an instrument, a function, a conduit of the essential unity. My work is metaphor, never simile. I make no distinction between subject and object, inner and outer, maker and viewer. I am continually surprised by what arises on the canvas or the paper. I am not a 'creator'. How can one create what is already there? I am mist, trees, rain, sun brush, canvas, weather, season, figure."

== Personal life ==
Jarvis died of heart disease on March 22, 2001, in Sechelt, British Columbia, leaving his wife, Gladys, their two sons, Graham and Roy, and grandchildren, Jennifer and Scott and one of the most varied Canadian art collections.
