= Cultures of Vision =

1995 book by Ron Burnett

- Author: Ron Burnett
- Language: English
- Publisher: Indiana University Press
- Publication date: 1995
- Media type: Print

Cultures of Vision is a 1995 book by Ron Burnett, in which the author explores the relationship between visual cultures and popular culture. It was published by the Indiana University Press.
