= Victoria Film Festival =

Canadian film festival

- Location: 1215 Blanshard Street; Victoria, British Columbia; V8W 3J4
- No. of films: 190
- Language: International
- Website: www.victoriafilmfestival.com

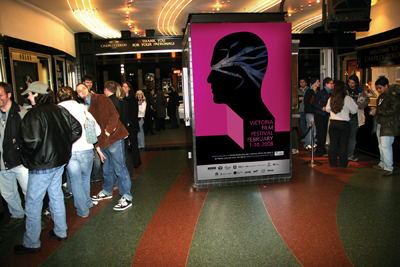
People queuing for tickets outside the Cineplex Odeon Victoria Cinemas in Downtown Victoria

The Victoria Film Festival is a publicly attended film festival in Victoria, British Columbia, Canada running for ten days in February. The festival shows both Canadian and international films and unreels 150 films with 55 Features on 6 screens around Victoria. It attracts a continually growing audience, reaching 24,000 in 2011. The festival began in 1995 and is a provincially registered non-profit and federally registered charitable organization.

== Festival Special Events ==
=== Opening Gala ===
All-inclusive night of frivolity.

=== In Conversation With... ===
Join us for an engaging and lively night of conversation with a great actor.

=== SpringBoard: Industry Event ===
An event for people interested in creating films. Sessions include Collaborating with Finances, pitching buyers and producers and a networking reception.

=== VIFPA: Victoria Film Producers' Night ===
Enjoy a peek at what local filmmakers have been creating.

=== Family: Jammies & Toons ===
An all ages showing. The ritual of Sunday morning animations and unhealthy cereal returns to The Vic.

== Other Events Throughout The Year ==
=== Art of the Cocktail ===
A yearly fundraiser for the Victoria Film Festival. Art of the Cocktail features tastings, workshops, a competition for the best mixologist of the Pacific Northwest and more.

Distillery ambassadors, representatives and lounges will be offering tastes of their products or creating sophisticated cocktails for sampling. Wander around the Tasting Room sampling the cocktails that appeal to you while catching tips from mixologists, authors and reps. Take in ongoing demonstrations on their side stage that will run throughout the Tastings. Demonstrations include the competition for the Best Mixologist in the Pacific Northwest, a Flair demonstration and new trends worth trying.

Past guests have included Ron Cooper, Kevin Brauch, Philip Duff, Elayne Duke, Sabrina Greer, and Ted Haigh.

=== Free-B Film Festival ===
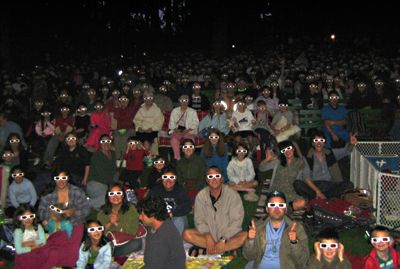
Free-B Film Festival, Free films in Beacon Hill Park, Victoria, British Columbia

Since 2001, the Victoria Film Festival has hosted the yearly Free-B Film Festival in August. The screenings are free and open to the public, carry a G or PG rating, and take place outdoor in Beacon Hill Park at the Cameron Bandshell. Since 2010, some of the screenings have also taken place in Centennial Square at the Victoria City Hall. Audiences range from a couple hundred, to 2000 for Jurassic Park in 2019.

=== FEAST: Food & Film ===
Delicious gastro focused films beautifully paired with a meal.

=== Movie Under The Maltworks ===
Beer, Films & Surprises at Phillips Backyard.

=== FilmCAN ===
November - January. An opportunity for local high school students to create a short video from beginning to end and have it screened at the Victoria Film Festival. Guided by local professional filmmakers, students are mentored and receive advice and information to create new work.

== Festival History ==
In 1995, the CineVic Society of Independent Filmmakers, along with Origins Theatre, began the Victoria Independent Film & Video Festival. The Festival was a low-key affair for the first three years, and during that time Origins Theatre closed in Victoria and the Festival fell entirely to CineVic, who turned the focus to short films and videos. After the third event, the Board of CineVic felt that if the Festival were going to affect the filmmaking community and develop audiences, then VIFVF would need to expand substantially.

The fourth Festival brought in filmmakers from Canada and around the globe and managed to capture the interest of the city for the weeklong event. The Festival had Canadian feature film premiere screenings of Stolen Heart, Cat Swallows Parakeet and Speaks, and the Canadian premiere of Smoke Signals, along with a multitude of short films including Rick Raxlen's Geometry of Beware.

Filmmakers were hosted by the Festival from farther a field than ever before, and included John Waters (Pink Flamingos, Serial Mom, Pecker); Scott Hylands ([Night Heat]), and Lynne Stopkewich (Kissed). The Festival managed to more than double the number of people viewing independent films. Many wonderful receptions provided opportunities for guests to meet and exchange ideas. A forum was added for discussion, learning and augmenting of skills. After the 1998 Festival, due to liability issues, CineVic and the Festival became separate societies.

Subsequent years saw the Festival dramatically increase in size to the 2008 high mark of 18,000 attendees. VFF has added film discussions, an event Let's Make a Movie gave the public an opportunity to try hands on filmmaking, a three-day new media program Interactive Futures brought together world class innovators, a family day, a four-part series that examined the influences on a notable filmmaker and a country highlight have been developed over the last seven years.

The Festival has hosted many guests including Kris Kristofferson, Atom Egoyan, David Foster, Barry Pepper, Arthur Hiller, Don McKellar, Jonathan Lipnicki, Dirk Benedict, Adam Carolla, Keith Carradine, Beverly D'Angelo, David Keith, and Bill Nighy.

In 2007, the Film Festival shortened its name to simply the Victoria Film Festival.
