= Renée Van Halm =

Canadian contemporary visual artist (born 1949)

- Born: 1949 (age 76–77); Haarlemmermeer, Netherlands
- Education: MFA Concordia University in Montréal BFA Vancouver School of Art now Emily Carr University of Art and Design
- Known for: installation, collage, painting
- Website: reneevanhalm.com

Renée Van Halm is a Canadian contemporary visual artist born in Haarlemmermeer, the Netherlands (1949) and immigrated to Canada in 1953.

== Exhibitions ==
Renée Van Halm has been featured in over 30 solo exhibitions including numerous exhibitions at the S.L. Simpson Gallery and Birch Contemporary in Toronto, Ontario, as well as Equinox Gallery in Vancouver, British Columbia, Canada. Notable exhibitions include:

- Interior Projections at Mercer Union, Toronto, ON (1980)
- Voor Gerrit/Healing at University of Lethbridge, AB (1982)
- Songs of Experience at the National Gallery of Canada, Ottawa, ON (1983)
- L' eau à la bouche, Art Gallery of Greater Victoria, Victoria, BC (1987)
- Anonymous Volumes, Oakville Galleries, Oakville, ON (1995)
- Dream Home, at the Contemporary Art Gallery (Vancouver), BC (2002), Southern Alberta Art Gallery, Lethbridge, AB (2002), and Kamloops Art Gallery, Kamloops, BC (2003)
- Reverse Engineering at the S.L. Simpson Gallery and Birch Contemporary in Toronto, ON (2009)
- Cross-Cutting/Inside Out, a 35-year survey exhibition of her works on paper at the Burnaby Art Gallery, Burnaby, BC (2012)
- Shape of Things at the West Vancouver Museum, Vancouver, BC (2017)

Her work has been included in numerous group exhibitions such as Aurora Borealis at the Centre international d'art contemporain, Montréal (1985), weak thought (1997–98) at the Vancouver Art Gallery, Architypes at the Charles H. Scott Gallery, Vancouver (2004) and the Embassy of Canada, Tokyo (2005), Cut and Paste at the Equinox Gallery(2012), The Poetics of Space at the Vancouver Art Gallery (2015), New Monuments Forget the Future at Birch Contemporary (2015), Return of the Image at the Beaverbrook Art Gallery, Fredericton, NB (2016), Form Follows Fiction at UTAC, Toronto (2016), and Elusive Utopias at the Judith and Norman Alix Gallery, Sarnia, ON (2017).

== Art practice ==
Renée Van Halm's work explores the history of painting and the production of hybrid objects that intersect painting, sculpture, and architecture. Her practice focuses on the material processes of painting and its traditional construction methods.

Of her artistic practice, Van Halm has written: "Cultural history and how we represent and inhabit architecture are fundamental to my work. Over the years I have looked at many subjects that reflect on art and design practices through the genres of still life and landscape as well as decor, abstraction and pattern. I am drawn to the expectations that underscore these preoccupations."

Van Halm often incorporates art historical, painterly references, as well as allusions to architectural history. Art critic Robin Laurence writes: "Her art takes on presence and absence, private and public, intimacy and grandeur, modernism, pre-modernism, and postmodernism, all in a manner that is gorgeously painterly and rigorously critical. The sources of Van Halm’s imagery range from early Renaissance paintings (as in Study for Annunciation) to contemporary real-estate ads (9,760 SF., 3590 Osler), and from interior design publications (Bedroom Scene/Marcel) to her own photographs and collages (Pearls)."

== Selected collections ==
Van Halm's work is held in numerous public and private collections including the Art Gallery of Nova Scotia, Halifax; Art Gallery of Ontario; Bank of Montréal; City of Burnaby Permanent Art Collection (Burnaby Art Gallery); Beaverbrook Art Gallery, Fredericton, NB; Canada Council Art Bank; Canadian House and Home magazine; Davies, Ward, NYC; Doris McCarthy Art Gallery, University of Toronto, Scarborough; Government of Canada Department of Foreign Affairs; Household Financial Corporation; London Regional Art Gallery; London Life Insurance; McCarthy, Tetrault, Toronto; McLaren Art Centre, Barrie, ON; Musée d’art contemporain, Montréal, QC; Musée des Beaux-Arts de Montréal, Montréal, QC; National Gallery of Canada; Osler, Hoskin and Harcourt, Price Waterhouse; The Prudential Insurance Company of America, Royal Bank of Canada; RSM Canada; Toronto Dominion Bank; Tory and Tory, Toronto; University of Lethbridge; University of Toronto Art Centre, Toronto; Vancouver Art Gallery; and the Winnipeg Art Gallery.

== Commissions ==
- 2002 - Taste/100 painting of the 20th century, Keesee Office Building, now Kirkpatrick Bank, Oklahoma City, OK, USA
- 2010 - South Hill (South Fraser) neighbourhood banner and mural project, Vancouver, BC
- 2015 - Awarded Joyce-Collingwood Skytrain Station public art commission, TransLink, Vancouver, BC
- 2016 - Façade Festival (projection), Burrard Arts Foundation, Vancouver Art Gallery Vancouver, BC
