= Centre for Digital Media =

University in Canada

Centre for Digital Media (CDM) is a multidisciplinary graduate institution based in Vancouver, British Columbia. It offers a Master of Digital Media (MDM) program accredited by its four partner institutions, the University of British Columbia, Simon Fraser University, Emily Carr University of Art + Design and the British Columbia Institute of Technology.

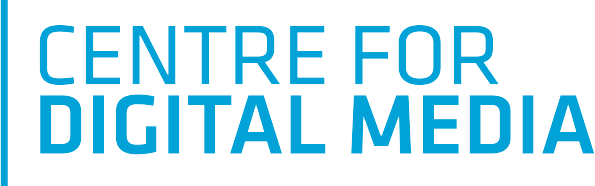
The Centre for Digital Media logo

== Master of Digital Media ==
The Master of Digital Media (MDM) program is the first jointly credentialed academic program offered at Centre for Digital Media on the Great Northern Way Campus (GNWC). It is the first professional graduate program in digital media to be offered in Canada.

The Master of Digital Media (MDM) program was designed and established to develop work-ready, professional talent for Vancouver's digital media industry. The curriculum, facilities and structure of the courses were developed with input from industry partners throughout Vancouver's digital media sector, such as Electronic Arts, Microsoft, Disney Interactive Studios, Annex Pro, Autodesk, Zynga, Relic Entertainment, Rainmaker Entertainment Inc., Nokia, IBM Canada, GRAND NCE, Clark Wilson LLP, Blast Radius. The goal of the curriculum is to produce graduates with a flexible repertoire of skills, rather than a single specialization.

The curriculum includes a combination of supervised project coursework for the first 12 months and internships for the final four months. Students work in interdisciplinary groups with both faculty members and industry professionals. Courses include Foundations of Digital Media, Foundations of Game Design, The Visual Story, and 'Projects' courses of increasing scope and complexity. Professionals from Vancouver's digital media industry serve as guest speakers and mentors, and industry partners offer internships, scholarships, and practical project opportunities for students.

The program is backed by a 2006 grant of CAD$40.5 million from the Province of British Columbia and by a 2007 commitment of CAD$1 million from the US computer game firm Electronic Arts. It also charges students $10,000 per semester ($15,000 for non-Canadians). Justifying this expense, the Trust's first CEO, Bruce Clayman, described it as "premium tuition for a premium program." To defray such costs, the Centre for Digital Media offers a number of student scholarships, as well as a variety of awards that grant students rent-free accommodations on the Great Northern Way Campus.

The program won some media attention in 2007 for using the Second Life virtual world as a recruiting tool, as well as for class activities, open houses and other live streamed events on their virtual campus.

As of September 20, 2012, the program moved into the new Centre for Digital Media building, known as CDM 685 after its 685 Great Northern Way address. This building completed construction in 2011 and was noticed to be a signal for the "start of a development that promises to transform the neighborhood." In addition to 76 student housing units, this 49,000 square foot building includes a 10,000-square-foot (930 m2) filming area and green screen, editing and filmmaking labs. Classrooms are equipped with "Dolby 5.1 capabilities, high-end wall projectors, Blu-ray playback."

== Industry projects ==
Industry projects are the key component of the Master of Digital Media program. Students work in project teams to create products for industry partners and must stay within the time, resource and management constraints that characterize professional work schedules in the digital media industry. The team must both prototype and produce a tangible result.

During Projects courses, teams of three to six students work on a focused project (or several, smaller related projects) during that semester. The primary objective of the courses is to provide a hands-on working experience with teammates who are from different backgrounds and disciplines, as well as familiarize students with industry expectations and prepare them for careers in the digital media sector by immersing them in real-world, team-based scenarios.

== Faculty ==
=== Founding faculty ===
- Tom Wujec
- Dr. Tom Calvert
- Dr. Gerri Sinclair
- Glenn Entis
- Ian Verchere
- Dr. Patrick Pennefather

=== Full-time faculty ===
- Jason Elliott
- Dr. Dave Fracchia
- Dr. Aida Elisabeta Osian
- Dr. Rachel Ralph

== Industry partners ==
The Master of Digital Media (MDM) program was designed with input from industry partners throughout Vancouver's digital media sector. These industry partners continue to collaborate with Centre for Digital Media by providing internships, sponsorships, collaborative projects and prototype development opportunities for students. Industry partners also connect with students as guest lecturers, mentors, and faculty.

== Startups ==
Centre for Digital Media allows students to pick client project or pitch project for their third term. Students who opt for pitch projects have to form a team of 3-5 members and submit a project proposal for approval by the faculty. Once approved, each pitch project team has to present in front of a panel of faculty, industry leaders and investors. After the presentation, the panel approves teams for pitch project term.

There are multiple projects which went on to the venture internship period, fourth term, which acts as an incubator space at Centre for Digital Media. Companies which spun out of CDM include Quupe Technologies Inc, Walkies Lab Inc and Generate App.

== Facilities ==
Centre for Digital Media was designed to cater to the specific needs of digital media students. In addition to 76 on-site student housing units, CDM features many other amenities:
