= Joanna Berzowska =

Canadian academic

Joanna Berzowska is an Associate Professor of Design and Computation Arts at Concordia University in Montreal. Her work and research deal primarily with "soft computation": electronic textiles, responsive clothing as wearable technology, reactive materials and squishy interfaces.

A native of Poland, she grew up in Algeria and Gabon before coming to Montreal to study university. She has a design degree from Concordia University and a mathematics degree from McGill University.

She is the founder of XS Labs (Extra Soft) in Montreal, where her team develops electronic textile and reactive fashion projects such as Memory-Rich Garments. She is also the Director of the Interactive Textiles and Wearable Computers Axis at the Hexagram Institute. She was the founder in 2001 of International Fashion Machines in Boston, where she developed the first electronic ink wearable animated display and Electric Plaid, an addressable color-change textile.

She received her Masters of Science from MIT for her work titled Computational Expressionism. She worked with the Tangible Media Group of the MIT Media Lab on research projects such as the musicBottles. She directed Interface Design at the Institute for Interactive Media at the University of Technology in Sydney. She holds a BA in Pure Mathematics and a BFA in Design Arts.

Her art and design work has been shown in the Cooper-Hewitt Design Museum in NYC, V&A in London, Millennium Museum in Beijing, SIGGRAPH, ISEA, Art Directors Club in NYC, Australian Museum in Sydney, NTT ICC in Tokyo and Ars Electronica Center in Linz among others. She has lectured about the intersections of art, design, technology and computation at SIGGRAPH, ISEA, Banff New Media Institute in Canada, and Interaction Design Institute Ivrea in Italy among others. In 2016 she was awarded a Montreal Women’s Y Distinction Award in Science and technology.
