= Ron Burnett =

British academic administrator (born 1947)

Ron Burnett OC OBC RCA
- Born: Ronald Frank Burnett; May 24, 1947 (age 79); London, England, United Kingdom
- Known for: Author, educator, administrator
- Awards: Order of Canada
- Website: www.ron-burnett.com

Ronald Frank Burnett OC OBC RCA (born 1947) is an author, professor and the President Emeritus Emily Carr University of Art and Design.

== Education ==
Burnett was born 24 May 1947 in London, England.

In 1981, he received a PhD in Communications Studies from McGill University. He was a professor at La Trobe University in Melbourne from 1983 to 1986 and a teacher, during the 1970s at Vanier College in Montreal. He was the director of the Graduate Program in Communications at McGill University from 1987 to 1996.

== Works ==
Burnett is the author of A Biography of Learning, published by University of Toronto Press in 2025 and Cultures of Vision: Images, Media and the Imaginary, published by Indiana University Press in 1995 and How Images Think published by MITPress. He is the editor of Explorations in Film Theory published in 1991 by Indiana University Press. He is the author of over 150 published articles and book chapters. He is an adjunct professor at York University, and is one of the founders of Canadian Film Studies through a journal that he developed and edited, Ciné-Tracts, from 1977 until 1982.

Burnett completed twenty-two years as president and Vice-Chancellor at ECUAD and is now President Emeritus and a Professor and Researcher.

== Honours ==
- Queen's Golden Jubilee Medal 2002
- iDMAa Outstanding Leadership Award 2010
- Educator of the Year, Canadian New Media Association, 2005
- Order of France: Chevalier of the Ordre des Arts et des Lettres, 2010.
- Queen's Diamond Jubilee Medal, 2012
- Royal Canadian Academy of Arts
- Member of the Order of Canada (2013), promoted to Officer in 2024
- Member of the Order of British Columbia (2015)

== See also ==
- List of Canadian university leaders
