= Great Northern Way Campus =

Canadian company

Great Northern Way Campus Ltd
- Type: Private Limited Company
- Established: 2001
- Affiliations: University of British Columbia, Simon Fraser University, British Columbia Institute of Technology, Emily Carr University of Art and Design
- Academic staff: 6 full-time
- Students: 55+
- Location: Vancouver, British Columbia, Canada; 49°16′3″N 123°5′30″W
- Campus: Urban, 7.5 ha (19 acres) or 0.075 km^{2} (0.0290 sq mi)
- Website: www.gnwc.ca

Great Northern Way Campus Ltd (GNWC) is a private limited company and educational enterprise located in Vancouver, British Columbia, Canada. It is the offspring of a consortium of four local academic institutions (the University of British Columbia, Simon Fraser University, Emily Carr University of Art and Design and the British Columbia Institute of Technology, each of whom own a 25% interest in the company) that has attracted significant public and private funding. The company is the trustee of the Great Northern Way Campus Trust, whose stated purpose is to create "a centre of convergence for arts and culture, digital media and the environment." At present, it manages a Master's degree in Digital Media, which admitted its first students in the Fall of 2007.

The GNWC Trust has two principal activities: operating the Centre for Digital Media, which offers the Masters of Digital Media graduate degree, and revitalizing its land parcel to bring together business, academia and the general community into an emerging district for the digital and creative sectors. Eight projects, which include both new construction and renovations of existing buildings, are underway and several businesses in the digital media sector currently rent space on the campus.

== History ==
In 2001, the industrial distributor Finning International donated 7.5 hectares (19 acres) of former industrial land in the False Creek flats area of Vancouver to the GNWC Trust formed by the four academic partner institutions, though Finning retained a 20% interest in the site. No public money was spent, and the declared aim was "to cover the costs of future educational programs and buildings at the False Creek flats with revenues generated by private sector development." Beyond the tax write-off advantages, Finning also hoped that a further four-acre site that it kept for itself would now "be easier to market because of the university component." In the words of Bob Laurie, Finning's real estate consultant: "We're not philanthropists. We're looking at creating shareholder value and that's what I think we've done today."

By way of a trust deed, dated September 15, 2002, management and development of the property was delegated by the four partner institutions to a limited company to act as their trustee, Great Northern Way Campus Ltd.

A Shareholder's Agreement governs the Trustee and stipulates that one representative of each shareholder will sit on the Trustee's Board, along with up to eight other directors, to guide the Trustee's activities. The board chair is Morgan Sturdy, "a high tech entrepreneur" and director of Discovery Parks Inc. The company's president is Matthew Carter, who "has an extensive background in real estate finance and development."

In 2006 the Province gave $40 million as an endowment fund to establish the Centre for Digital Media. The Government's objective with this funding was to build Vancouver's prominence as a digital media hub. Among other things, this included launching a Masters of Digital Media (MDM) graduate degree program that would be operated by the Trustee and issue a degree credentialed by all four partners. The Trustee has outsourced operational management of the MDM program to SFU under a Management Services Agreement.

As of 2012, GNWC President Matthew Carter claimed that its academic program would break even financially (previously it had been running a deficit in the order of $388,000 per year), and the debt incurred from the site acquisition would be repaid.

In January 2013, British Columbia premier Christy Clark announced the province's intention to fund a $130 million relocation of the Emily Carr University of Art and Design to the GNWC property.

In April 2017, Catherine Warren was appointed president of Great Northern Way Trust. In 2018, Great Northern Way adapted and no longer has a president.

== Centre for Digital Media ==
The Centre for Digital Media is described as together business, academia and the general community into an emerging district for the digital and creative sectors in Vancouver, British Columbia. It offers a full-time Masters of Digital Media program and a part-time version, the Executive Masters of Digital Media, as well as student housing. The area immediately surrounding the Centre has office space for digital media companies, which not only recoups revenue but is also meant to facilitate the interaction between the Centre and the digital media industry.

== Digital media industry ==
Space at the GNWC complex is occupied by the four partner academic institutions, plus a number of commercial tenants and student housing.

From 2012 onwards, GNWC has had commercial tenants that are aligned with the Trust’s vision for the campus, including Scalar Decisions, Blackbird Interactive, GRAND (Graphics, Animation and New Media Canada), Discovery Parks’ Generator, Conquer Mobile, and Image Engine.

In 2012, Image Engine partnered with Rainmaker Entertainment Inc. and Digital Domain and received financial backing from Toronto-based Scalar Decisions to set up a render farm at GNWC. Dubbed ‘RenderCloud,’ the facility’s goal is to offer scalable, high-end VFX development capabilities to major movie studios, and prevent them from being lured away to competitors in countries such as New Zealand and England. The RenderCloud facility is leasing 3,500 square feet of space from GNWC at reportedly ‘favorable’ rates.

Academic research projects that rent space at GNWC include BCIT's Centre for the Advancement of Green Roof Technology. BCIT also offers trades and apprenticeship programs and courses at GNWC.

In addition, UBC Properties Trust and the Justice Institute of British Columbia have offices at the GNWC district. Some space is also rented for artistic production and rehearsal purposes. For example, eatART, a charity that fosters new media art research with a focus on large-scale, kinetic and robotic sculpture, resides in a shop on the property. Also, the Equinox and Monte Clark Galleries opened a location on the GNWC property in 2012 and are now located in the 525 building.

GNWC has hosted several film productions and special events. These include LANcouver, which was held at the warehouse in the Centre for Digital Media in May 2011, and Mini Maker Faire Vancouver, which was held at the same location in June 2011.

== Property development ==
GNWC earns most of its income from property management and has announced ambitious plans to redevelop its property. The land is to be divided into three subdistricts: the Centre for Digital Media, Art Park District, and the home of a relocated Emily Carr University of Art and Design.

GNWC built a new Centre for Digital Media building on the east side of the property. The building includes teaching facilities, office space, meeting and event spaces and 76 student housing units. It opened in September 2012.

At the west side of the property, the GNWC recently sold two land parcels to Onni Development Ltd., on which it plans to build approximately 200 residential and artist studio units on one parcel, and live/work units on the other. The revenue generated by the sale of land is being used to pay off debt accrued from purchasing the property and establishing the Masters of Digital Media program.

Further revenue generated from investments and property rental income will be put towards an endowment enhancement fund that will be used to fund MDM student scholarships, CDM-branded events to bring students and the digital media industry professionals together, as well as future on-site developments that align with the Trust’s vision.
