= British Columbia Arts Council =

The British Columbia Arts Council (or BC Arts Council) is a statutory independent agency supporting arts in British Columbia.

The Council was created by the BC Arts Council Act, 1995. In the year ending March 31, 2018 Council distributed over C$24 million in awards, grants and scholarships to individuals and organizations in 225 communities across the province.
