= Emily Carr University of Art and Design =

Canadian art school in Vancouver, Canada

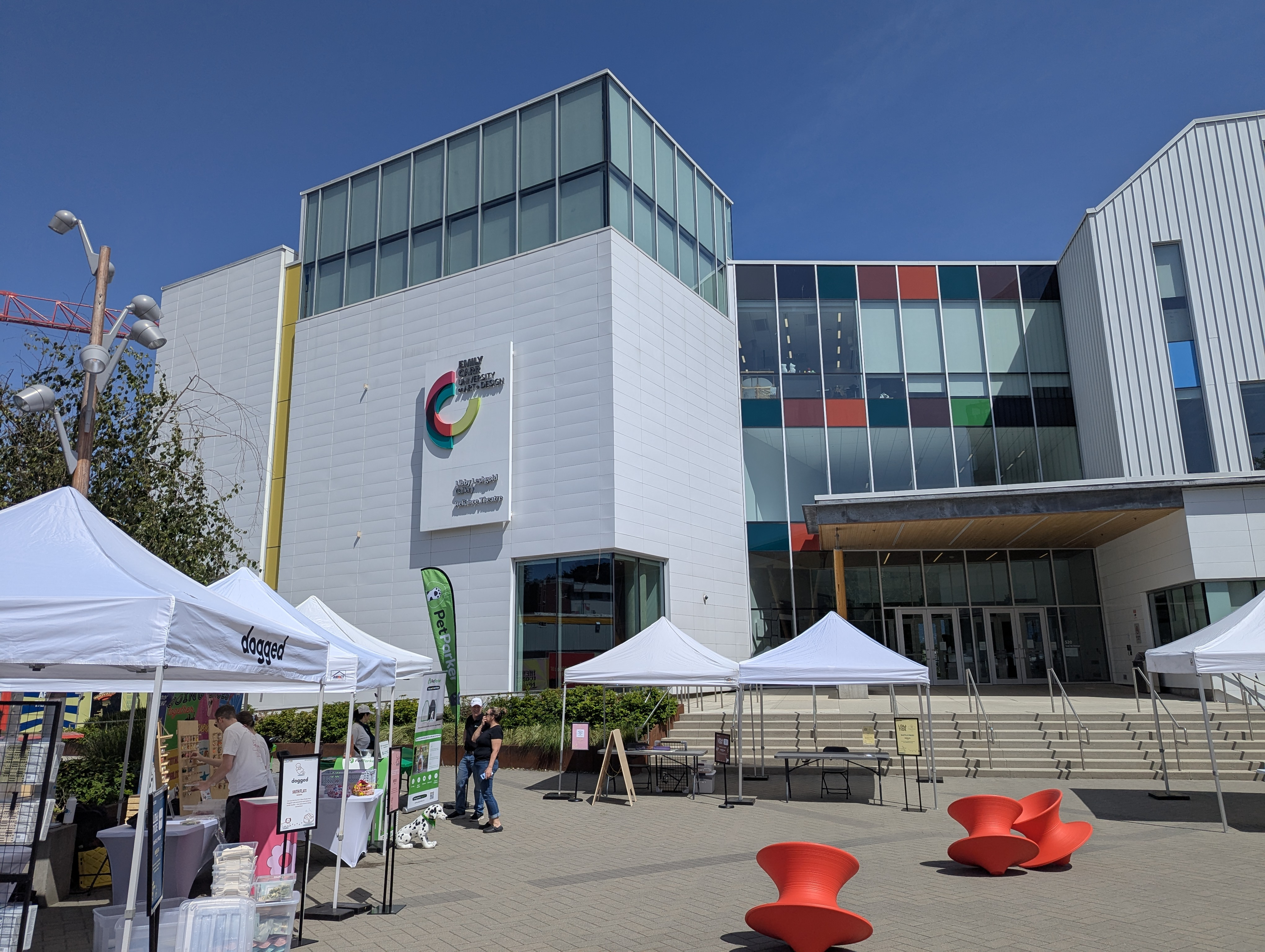
- Campus on Great Northern Way (May 2025)
- Motto: Eye, Mind, and Hand
- Type: Public university
- Established: October 1, 1925; 101 years ago
- Academic affiliations: AICAD, Universities Canada
- Endowment: $6.18 million (2022)
- Chancellor: Carleen Thomas
- President: Trish Kelly
- Provost: Diyan Achjadi
- Faculty: 200
- Administrative staff: 240
- Students: 1,700 (2024-25 FTE)
- Undergraduates: 2,093 (2023)
- Postgraduates: 92 (2023)
- Location: 520 1st Avenue East, Vancouver, British Columbia, Canada; 49°16′3.846″N 123°5′38.8644″W
- Campus: Urban
- Colours: Pink, lime, and turquoise
- Website: www.ecuad.ca
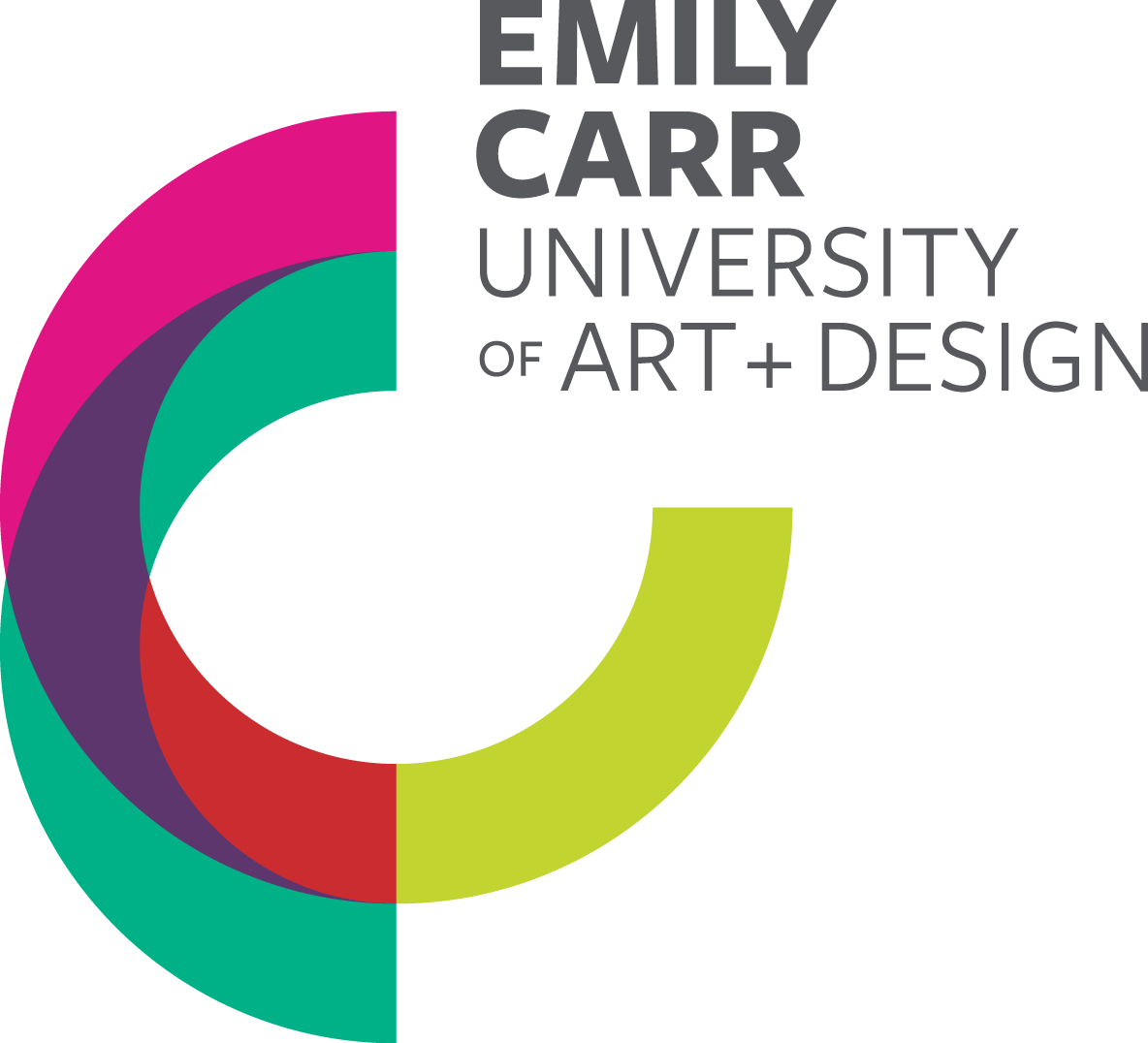

The Emily Carr University of Art and Design (stylized as Emily Carr University of Art + Design and abbreviated as ECU) is a public university of art and design located in Vancouver, British Columbia, Canada. Founded in 1925 as the Vancouver School of Decorative and Applied Arts, it is the oldest public post-secondary institution in British Columbia dedicated to professional education in the arts, media, and design. The university is named for Canadian artist and writer Emily Carr, who was known for her Modernist and Post-Impressionist artworks.

The university is co-educational with four academic faculties: the Faculty of Culture + Community, the Ian Gillespie Faculty of Design + Dynamic Media, the Audain Faculty of Art, and the Jake Kerr Faculty of Graduate Studies. ECU also offers non-degree education through its continuing studies, certificate, and youth programs. Currently, the university has a combined body of over 2,100 undergraduate and graduate students along with over 13,000 alumni.

According to the QS World University Rankings, as of 2025, the school is ranked 36th in the world and first in Canada amongst institutions for art and design.

== History ==
Formerly established by the British Columbia Art League as the Vancouver School of Decorative and Applied Arts in 1925, the school was renamed the Vancouver School of Art in 1933. Unit/Pitt gallery was established by the student society of Vancouver School of Art. In 1978, the school was designated a provincial institute and incorporated as the Emily Carr College of Art and Design before moving to Granville Island in 1980. In 1995, a second building was opened on the Granville Island campus, at which time the college's name changed to the Emily Carr Institute of Art and Design (ECIAD). Around the same year, the institute was granted authority to offer its own undergraduate and honorary doctoral degrees. On April 28, 2008, the provincial government announced that it would amend the University Act at the Legislative Assembly of British Columbia and recognize ECIAD as a full university, which was formally named the Emily Carr University of Art + Design.

The first graduate program at the university was introduced in 2003 (MFA) and would later expand to include the Master of Applied Arts (MAA) in 2006, the Master of Digital Media (MDM) in 2007, and the Master of Design in 2013 (MDes). The MDM program, in particular, was launched through the Centre for Digital Media, a campus consortium of four post-secondary institutions in British Columbia.

In 2017, ECU moved from its longtime home on Granville Island to a permanent, purpose-built campus on Great Northern Way, which can accommodate more than twice as many students than the previous campus. The university's new location sits on a former industrial site within the False Creek Flats neighbourhood in East Vancouver.

== Campus ==
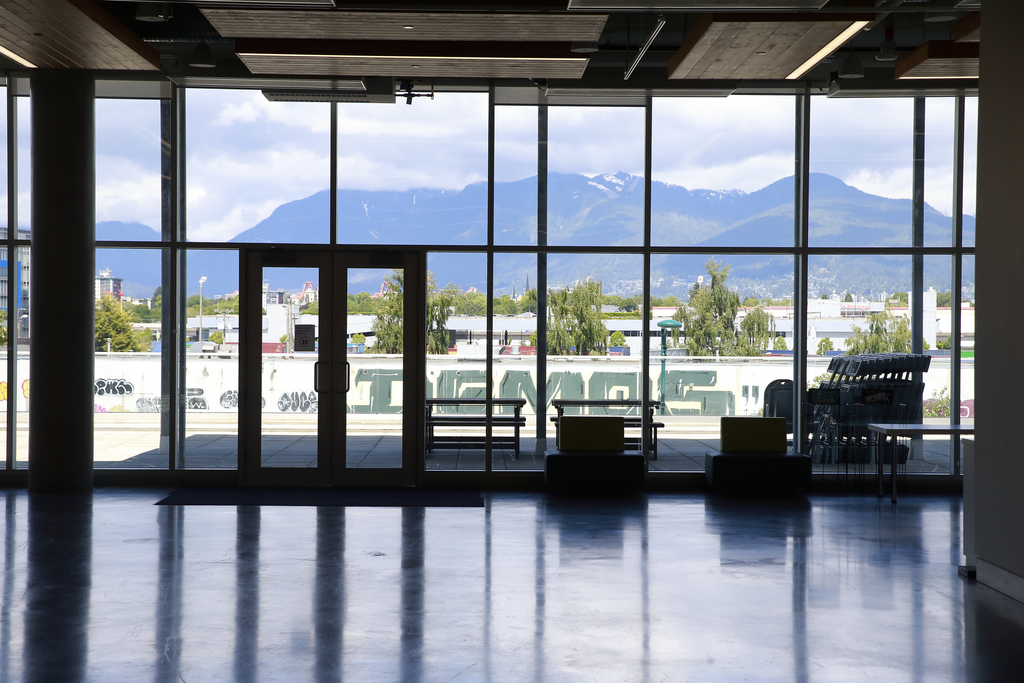
Cafeteria at Emily Carr University

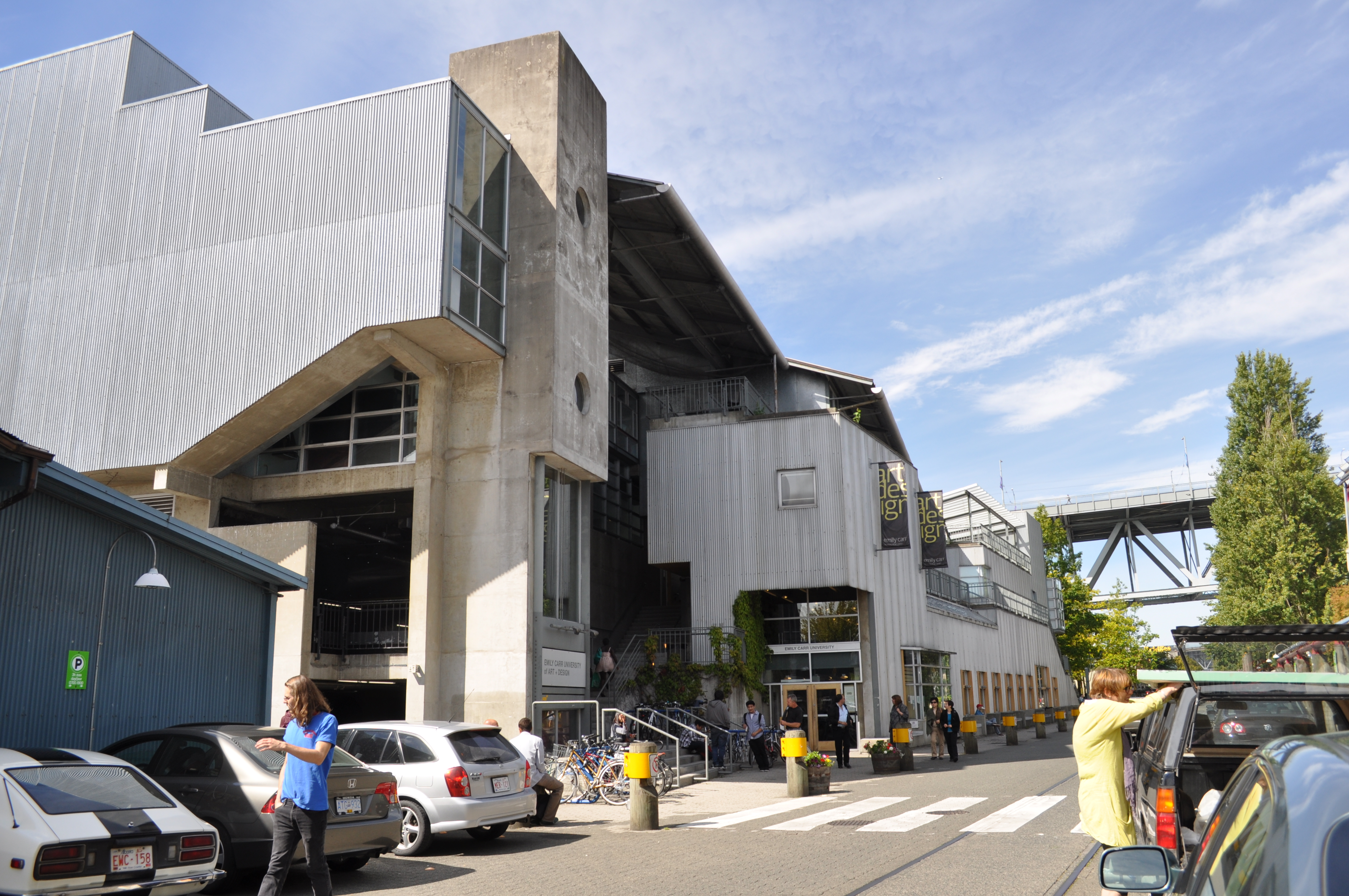
One of ECU's former buildings at Granville Island in 2010

The university's campus is located within a four-storey 26,915 square metre (289,730 sq. ft.) structure in the False Creek Flats neighbourhood of Vancouver. Designed by Diamond Schmitt Architects and constructed by EllisDon in 2017, the school's premises contains an outdoor plaza, student commons, galleries, faculty and administration offices, exhibition spaces, studios, classrooms, a canteen, patio, and three lecture theatres. In addition, several Indigenous design elements were incorporated into the interiors of the building. The exterior facade has white metal panels and glass reminiscent of a blank canvas, as well as back-painted glass spandrel panels to evoke a sequence of colours and transitions. The building's colour palette was selected by faculty members, the well-known Canadian painters, Landon Mackenzie and Ben Reeves. Mackenzie then was commissioned to select a unique composition to place over 240 separate glass coloured panels, which never repeated twice across exterior facades of the university. Symbolically she linked the colours and combinations to the painter Emily Carr (1871-1945) in honour of the university's namesake.

The building forms a part of the larger Great Northern Way Campus, a 7.5 hectares (18.5 acres) multi-use property that is shared with four other post-secondary institutions through the Great Northern Way Trust. Emily Carr University, along with British Columbia Institute of Technology, Simon Fraser University, and the University of British Columbia, are all equal shareholders in the trust and utilize their own facilities on the campus.

ECU is also home to the Libby Leshgold Gallery, a public art gallery dedicated to contemporary art by emerging and established artists, both domestic and international. The gallery also operates READ Books, an independent bookstore that specializes in artists' books, monographs, exhibition catalogues, textbooks, non-fiction, fiction, and design publications.

== Academics ==
Emily Carr University specializes in art and design education, which merges studio practice, research, and critical theory in an interdisciplinary and collaborative environment. The school offers academic programs and continuing education courses in sustainable design, writing, photography, new media art, visual arts, game development, interactive media, animation, industrial design, product design, ceramics, sculpture, communication design, and illustration.

Degree programs include:

- Bachelor of Fine Arts (BFA) in Cultural + Critical Practices, Illustration, Photography, or Visual Arts. Visual arts majors can choose to specialize in painting, ceramics, drawing, print media, or sculpture and extended practices.
- Bachelor of Design (BDes) in Communication Design, Interaction Design, or Industrial Design.
- Bachelor of Media Arts (BMA) in Animation (2D + Experimental Animation or 3D Computer Animation), Film + Screen Arts, or New Media + Sound Arts.
- Master of Fine Arts (MFA) in Visual Arts.
- Master of Design (MDes) with Interdisciplinary and User Experience (UX) options.

=== Research ===
ECU primarily conducts research in studio-based art, media, and design through the participation of faculty members, students, research chairs, and industry partners. The school currently hosts five applied research centres and labs: the Basically Good Media Lab (BGML), DESIS Lab, Health Design Lab, Material Matters, and the Shumka Centre for Creative Entrepreneurship. In November 2009, ECU teamed up with Lucasfilm spinoff, Kerner Optical, to announce the establishment of a stereoscopic 3-D research studio. Garnet Hertz and Amber Frid-Jimenez joined the university in 2014 as the first ever Canada Research Chairs of an art and design institution in the country. In 2015, historian and curator Richard Hill joined the university as the third Canada Research Chair, specializing in Indigenous Studies.

=== Library ===
The Ron Burnett Library + Learning Commons is the university's library that serves students, faculty, and the public, and is named after Ron Burnett, one of the former presidents of ECU. The library spans three floors and also houses commons spaces, the writing centre, the teaching and learning centre, exhibition/event space, study rooms, special collections, and the university archives.

== Arms ==
Emily Carr Institute of Art and Design's arms, supporters, flag, and badge were registered with the Canadian Heraldic Authority on April 20, 2007.

Coat of arms of Emily Carr University of Art and Design
Notes Granted by the Chief Herald of Canada in Letters Patent on 20 April 2007. Crest Issuant from flames a Coast Salish spindle whorl charged with a raven all Argent embellished Azure. The Coast Salish raven styled by Susan Point (RCA) represents, as it does in many West Coast First Nations cultures, transformation and cleverness. In this instance, it represents Emily Carr’s interest in the First Peoples as well as the idea that the artist transforms materials to give them new shape and meaning and that art can transform the way the viewer perceives the world. The flames symbolize the idea that the University’s professors liberate what burns in each student and what sets them on fire. Escutcheon Azure six piles reversed throughout Argent three in bend meeting in point three in bend sinister meeting in point all counterchanged. Supporters Two crows Azure standing on a rock Argent above barry wavy Argent and Azure. The crow is the smaller cousin of the raven, but unlike the raven the crow is at home in urban areas. Here the crows represent the University’s urban setting on Granville Island next to the waters of False Creek. As well, they are noted for their intelligence, and thus symbolize the intellectual quotient in all aesthetic endeavours. Motto Eye Mind and Hand

== Notable people ==
=== Alumni ===
- Kate Ali
- Unity Bainbridge
- Arnold Belkin
- Alexandra Bischoff
- Molly Lamb Bobak
- Emily Kai Bock
- Phillip Borsos
- Annie Briard
- Karin Bubaš
- Arabella Campbell
- Neko Case
- Douglas Coupland
- Stan Douglas
- Kevin Eastwood
- Geoffrey Farmer
- Ann Marie Fleming
- Tommy Genesis
- Jude Griebel
- Angela Grossmann
- Sophie Hackett
- Colleen Heslin
- E. J. Hughes
- Carole Itter
- Donald Jarvis
- Lynn Johnston
- Brian Jungen
- Ann Kipling
- Terence Koh
- Brian Kokoska
- Julian Lawrence
- Annie Liu
- Attila Richard Lukacs
- Irene Luxbacher
- Jeannie Mah
- Sara Mameni
- Dandilion Wind Opaine
- Frank Palmer
- Aaron Pollard of (2boys.tv)
- Brandy Saturley
- Jack Shadbolt
- Edith L. Sharp
- Jeremy Shaw
- Elise Siegel
- Heather Spears
- Jeff Chiba Stearns
- Merike Talve
- Ronald Thom
- Renée Van Halm
- Ola Volo
- Joy Zemel Long

=== Faculty and emeriti ===
- Gina Adams
- Julie Andreyev
- Marian Penner Bancroft
- Ron Burnett
- Peg Campbell
- Randy Lee Cutler
- Garnet Hertz
- Maria Hupfield (Wasauksing Ojibwe)
- Landon Mackenzie
- Sandra Semchuk
- Gregory Scofield (Métis)
- Durwin Talon
- Henry Tsang
- Frederick Varley
- Ian Wallace
- Janet Wang
- Rita Wong
- Leonard Woods

== See also ==
- Higher education in British Columbia
- List of colleges and universities named after people
- List of universities in British Columbia
