= List of accolades received by Vice (2018 film) =

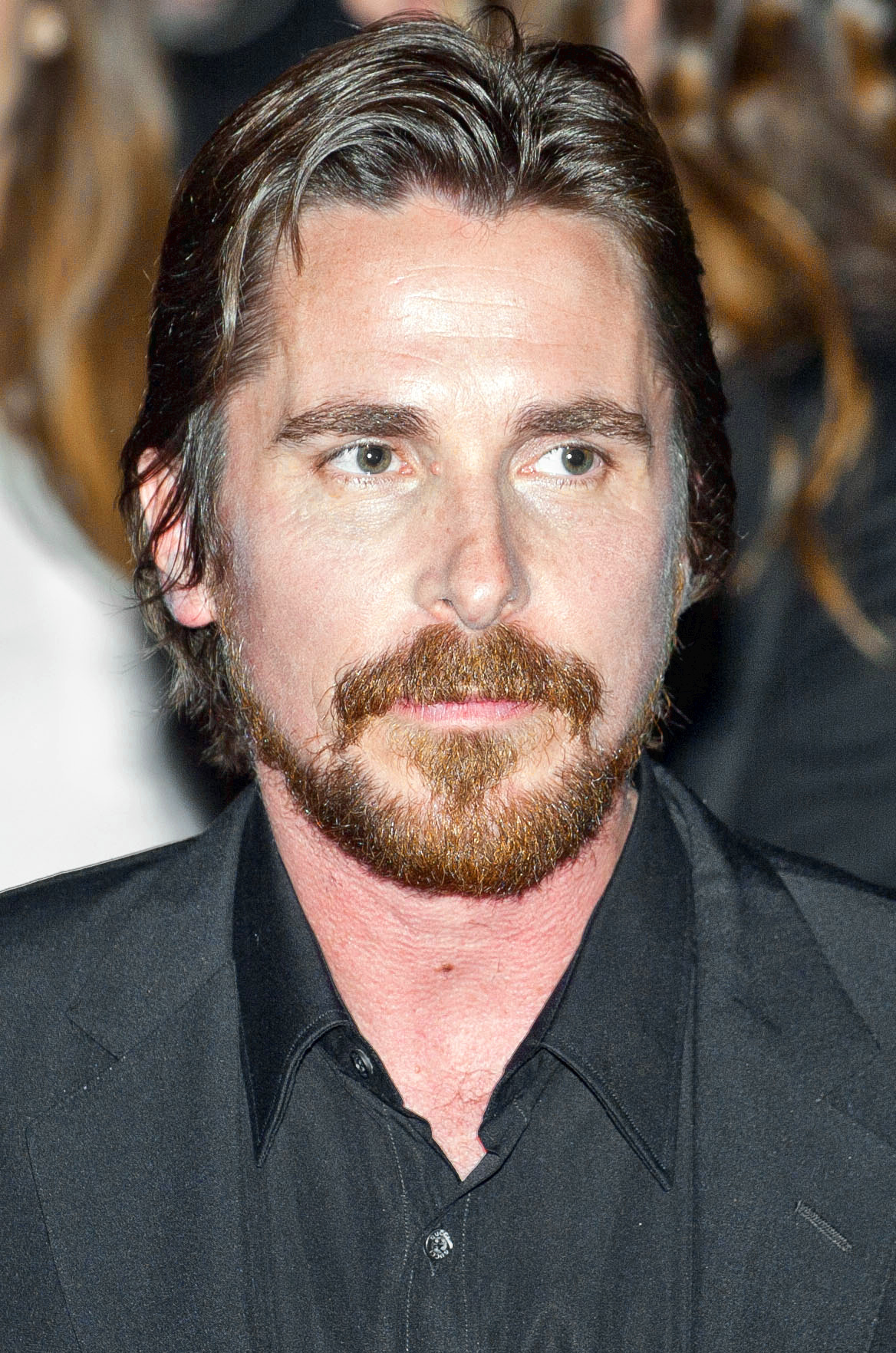
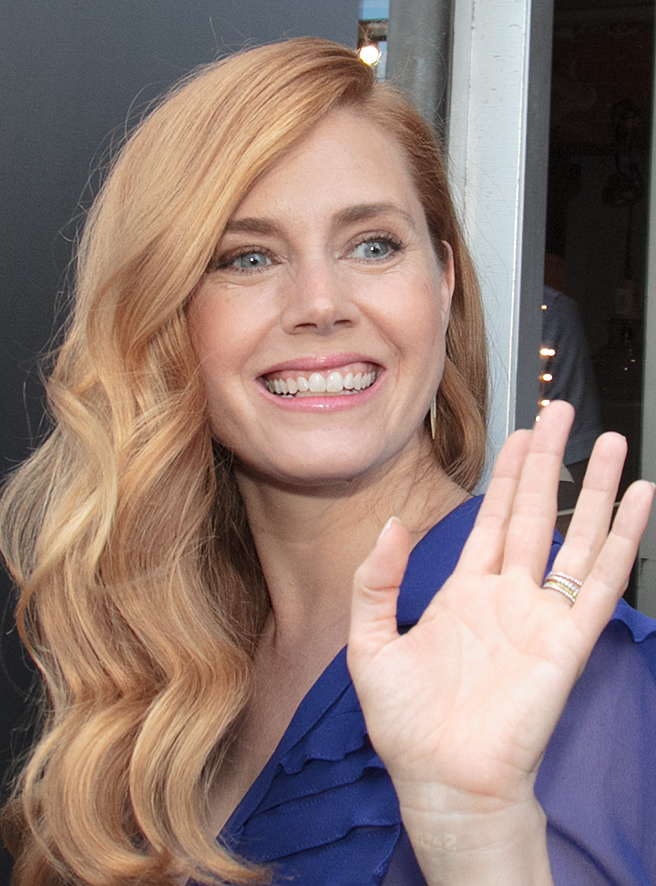
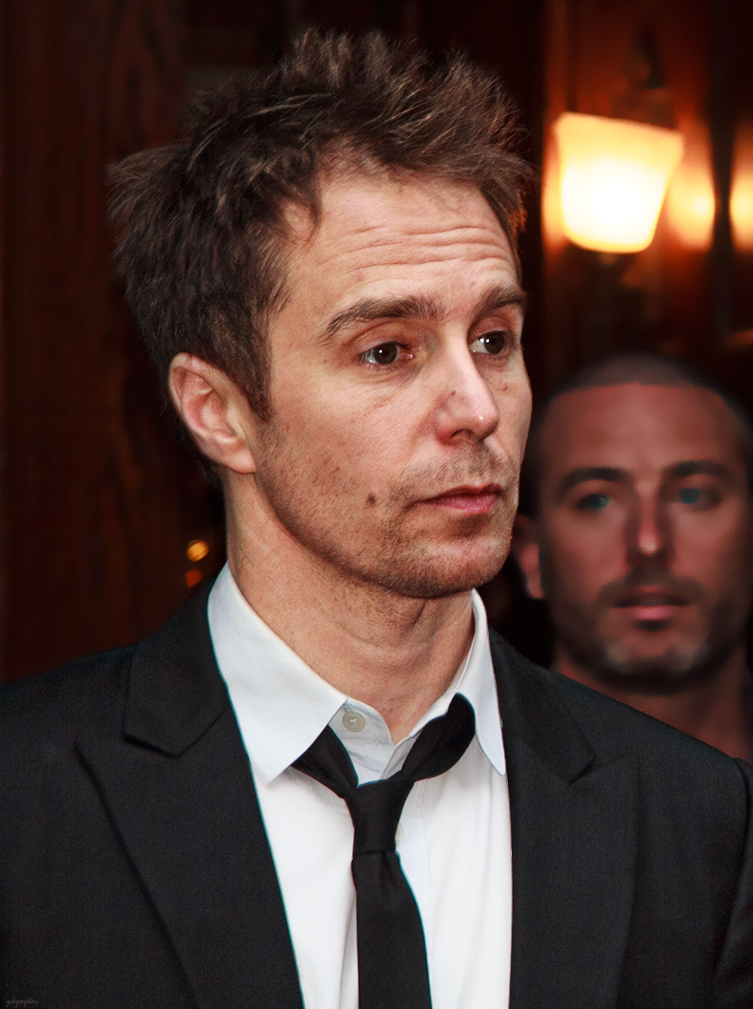
- Christian Bale, Amy Adams and Sam Rockwell received acclaim for their performances in the film.
Accolades
Award	Wins	Nominations
AACTA International Awards	0	4
Academy Awards	1	8
Alliance of Women Film Journalists	0	8
American Film Institute Awards	0	1
Austin Film Critics Association	0	2
British Academy Film Awards	1	6
Capri Hollywood International Film Festival	2	2
Chicago Film Critics Association	0	2
Chicago Independent Film Critics Circle	0	3
Critics' Choice Movie Awards	3	9
Dallas–Fort Worth Film Critics Association	1	4
Detroit Film Critics Society	3	5
Dorian Awards	0	1
Florida Film Critics Circle	0	1
Gold Derby Awards	1	3
Gold Derby 2010s Decade Awards	0	1
Golden Globe Awards	1	6
Golden Raspberry Award	0	1
Houston Film Critics Society	1	5
Latino Entertainment Journalists Association Film Awards	0	6
London Film Critics' Circle	0	2
Los Angeles Online Film Critics Society	1	3
Make-Up Artists & Hair Stylists Guild	2	2
New York Film Critics Online	1	1
North Carolina Film Office	1	1
Online Film Critics Society	0	1
Producers Guild of America	0	1
San Diego Film Critics Society	0	1
San Francisco Film Critics Circle	0	3
Screen Actors Guild Awards	0	2
Seattle Film Critics Society	0	1
St. Louis Film Critics Association	2	8
Utah Film Critics Association	0	1
Vancouver Film Critics Circle	0	1
Washington D.C. Area Film Critics Association	1	3

Totals (Note: Certain award groups do not simply award one winner. They acknowledge several different recipients, have runners-up, and have third place. Since this is a specific recognition and is different from losing an award, runner-up mentions are considered wins in this award tally. For simplification and to avoid errors, each award in this list has been presumed to have had a prior nomination.)
- Wins: 22
- Nominations: 108

Vice is a 2018 American biographical comedy-drama film written and directed by Adam McKay. The film stars Christian Bale as Dick Cheney, with Amy Adams, Steve Carell, Sam Rockwell, Tyler Perry, Alison Pill, and Jesse Plemons in supporting roles. The plot follows Cheney in his desire to become the most powerful Vice President in America's history. It is the second theatrical film to depict the presidency of George W. Bush, following Oliver Stone's W.

Vice was released in the United States on December 25, 2018, by Annapurna Pictures. Despite the polarized reception for the film itself, the performances, particularly of Bale, Adams and Rockwell were given universal praise. The film received numerous awards. It was nominated for a leading six at the 76th Golden Globe Awards, including Best Motion Picture – Musical or Comedy, with Bale winning for Best Actor – Motion Picture Musical or Comedy; and six at the 72nd British Academy Film Awards, in categories including Best Actor (Bale), Best Supporting Actress (Adams) and Best Supporting Actor (Rockwell).

== Accolades ==
Award	Date of ceremony	Category	Nominee(s)	Result	Ref(s)
AACTA International Awards	January 4, 2019	Best Actor	Christian Bale	Nominated	
AACTA International Awards	January 4, 2019	Best Supporting Actress	Amy Adams	Nominated	
AACTA International Awards	January 4, 2019	Best Supporting Actor	Sam Rockwell	Nominated	
AACTA International Awards	January 4, 2019	Best Film	Vice	Nominated	
Academy Awards	February 24, 2019	Best Picture	Dede Gardner‍‍‌; Jeremy Kleiner; Adam McKay; Kevin J. Messick	Nominated	
Academy Awards	February 24, 2019	Best Director	Adam McKay	Nominated	
Academy Awards	February 24, 2019	Best Actor	Christian Bale	Nominated	
Academy Awards	February 24, 2019	Best Supporting Actor	Sam Rockwell	Nominated	
Academy Awards	February 24, 2019	Best Supporting Actress	Amy Adams	Nominated	
Academy Awards	February 24, 2019	Best Original Screenplay	Adam McKay	Nominated	
Academy Awards	February 24, 2019	Best Film Editing	Hank Corwin‍‍‌	Nominated	
Academy Awards	February 24, 2019	Best Makeup and Hairstyling	Kate Biscoe; Greg Cannom; Patricia Dehaney	Won	
Alliance of Women Film Journalists	January 10, 2019	Best Picture	Vice	Nominated	
Alliance of Women Film Journalists	January 10, 2019	Best Director	Adam McKay	Nominated	
Alliance of Women Film Journalists	January 10, 2019	Best Writing, Original Screenplay	Adam McKay	Nominated	
Alliance of Women Film Journalists	January 10, 2019	Best Actor	Christian Bale	Nominated	
Alliance of Women Film Journalists	January 10, 2019	Best Supporting Actress	Amy Adams	Nominated	
Alliance of Women Film Journalists	January 10, 2019	Best Supporting Actor	Steve Carell‍‍‌	Nominated	
Alliance of Women Film Journalists	January 10, 2019	Best Ensemble Cast	Francine Maisler	Nominated	
Alliance of Women Film Journalists	January 10, 2019	Best Film Editing	Hank Corwin‍‍‌	Nominated	
ACE Eddie Awards	1 February 2019	Best Edited Feature Film – Comedy or Musical	Hank Corwin‍‍‌	Nominated	
Austin Film Critics Association	January 7, 2019	Best Actor	Christian Bale	Nominated	
Austin Film Critics Association	January 7, 2019	Best Supporting Actress	Amy Adams	Nominated	
British Academy Film Awards	February 10, 2019	Best Actor in a Leading Role	Christian Bale	Nominated	
British Academy Film Awards	February 10, 2019	Best Actress in a Supporting Role	Amy Adams	Nominated	
British Academy Film Awards	February 10, 2019	Best Actor in a Supporting Role	Sam Rockwell	Nominated	
British Academy Film Awards	February 10, 2019	Best Original Screenplay	Adam McKay	Nominated	
British Academy Film Awards	February 10, 2019	Best Makeup and Hair	Kate Biscoe; Greg Cannom; Patricia Dehaney; Chris Gallaher	Nominated	
British Academy Film Awards	February 10, 2019	Best Editing	Hank Corwin‍‍‌	Won	
Capri Hollywood International Film Festival	January 2, 2019	Best Picture	Vice	Won	
Capri Hollywood International Film Festival	January 2, 2019	Best Supporting Actress	Amy Adams	Won	
Chicago Film Critics Association	December 8, 2018	Best Actor	Christian Bale	Nominated	
Chicago Film Critics Association	December 8, 2018	Best Original Screenplay	Adam McKay	Nominated	
Chicago Independent Film Critics Circle	February 2, 2019	Best Studio Film (Budgets Over US$20,000,000)	Vice	Nominated	
Chicago Independent Film Critics Circle	February 2, 2019	Best Costume Design and Make-Up	Susan Matheson (Costumes); Kate Biscoe (Make-Up)	Nominated	
Chicago Independent Film Critics Circle	February 2, 2019	Trailblazer Award	Adam McKay	Nominated	
Critics' Choice Movie Awards	January 13, 2019	Best Picture	Vice	Nominated	
Critics' Choice Movie Awards	January 13, 2019	Best Actor	Christian Bale	Won	
Critics' Choice Movie Awards	January 13, 2019	Best Supporting Actress	Amy Adams	Nominated	
Critics' Choice Movie Awards	January 13, 2019	Best Acting Ensemble	The cast of Vice	Nominated	
Critics' Choice Movie Awards	January 13, 2019	Best Director	Adam McKay	Nominated	
Critics' Choice Movie Awards	January 13, 2019	Best Actor in a Comedy	Christian Bale	Won	
Critics' Choice Movie Awards	January 13, 2019	Best Original Screenplay	Adam McKay	Nominated	
Critics' Choice Movie Awards	January 13, 2019	Best Editing	Hank Corwin‍‍‌	Nominated	
Critics' Choice Movie Awards	January 13, 2019	Best Hair and Makeup	Vice	Won	
Dallas–Fort Worth Film Critics Association Awards	December 17, 2018	Best Actor	Christian Bale	Won	
Dallas–Fort Worth Film Critics Association Awards	December 17, 2018	Best Supporting Actress	Amy Adams	Nominated	
Dallas–Fort Worth Film Critics Association Awards	December 17, 2018	Best Picture	Vice	Nominated	
Dallas–Fort Worth Film Critics Association Awards	December 17, 2018	Best Director	Adam McKay	Nominated	
Detroit Film Critics Society	December 3, 2018	Best Ensemble	The cast of Vice	Won	
Detroit Film Critics Society	December 3, 2018	Best Screenplay	Adam McKay	Won (Note: Tied with Green Book.)	
Detroit Film Critics Society	December 3, 2018	Best Director	Adam McKay	Won	
Detroit Film Critics Society	December 3, 2018	Best Actor	Christian Bale	Nominated	
Detroit Film Critics Society	December 3, 2018	Best Supporting Actress	Amy Adams	Nominated	
Dorian Awards	January 12, 2019	Film Performance of the Year - Actor	Christian Bale	Nominated	
Florida Film Critics Circle	December 21, 2018	Best Actor	Christian Bale	Nominated	
Gold Derby Awards	February 20, 2019	Best Actor	Christian Bale	Nominated	
Gold Derby Awards	February 20, 2019	Best Make-Up and Hair	Kate Biscoe; Greg Cannom; Patricia Dehaney	Won	
Gold Derby Awards	February 20, 2019	Best Supporting Actress	Amy Adams	Nominated	
Gold Derby 2010s Decade Awards	March 10, 2020	Best Make-Up and Hair	Kate Biscoe; Greg Cannom; Patricia Dehaney	Nominated	
Golden Globe Awards	January 6, 2019	Best Motion Picture – Musical or Comedy	Vice	Nominated	
Golden Globe Awards	January 6, 2019	Best Actor – Motion Picture Musical or Comedy	Christian Bale	Won	
Golden Globe Awards	January 6, 2019	Best Supporting Actress	Amy Adams	Nominated	
Golden Globe Awards	January 6, 2019	Best Supporting Actor	Sam Rockwell	Nominated	
Golden Globe Awards	January 6, 2019	Best Director	Adam McKay	Nominated	
Golden Globe Awards	January 6, 2019	Best Screenplay	Adam McKay	Nominated	
Golden Raspberry Award	February 23, 2019	Razzie Redeemer Award	Tyler Perry‍‍‌	Nominated	
Houston Film Critics Society Awards	January 3, 2019	Best Actor	Christian Bale	Won	
Houston Film Critics Society Awards	January 3, 2019	Best Supporting Actress	Amy Adams	Nominated	
Houston Film Critics Society Awards	January 3, 2019	Best Director	Adam McKay	Nominated	
Houston Film Critics Society Awards	January 3, 2019	Best Screenplay	Adam McKay	Nominated	
Houston Film Critics Society Awards	January 3, 2019	Best Picture	Vice	Nominated	
Latino Entertainment Journalists Association Film Awards	January 20, 2019	Best Picture	Vice	Nominated	
Latino Entertainment Journalists Association Film Awards	January 20, 2019	Best Achievement in Directing	Adam McKay	Nominated	
Latino Entertainment Journalists Association Film Awards	January 20, 2019	Best Performance by an Actor in a Leading Role	Christian Bale	Nominated	
Latino Entertainment Journalists Association Film Awards	January 20, 2019	Best Original Screenplay	Adam McKay	Nominated	
Latino Entertainment Journalists Association Film Awards	January 20, 2019	Best Editing	Hank Corwin	Nominated	
Latino Entertainment Journalists Association Film Awards	January 20, 2019	Best Hair & Makeup	Kate Biscoe; Greg Cannom; Patricia Dehaney; Chris Gallaher	Nominated	
London Film Critics' Circle	January 20, 2019	Actor of the Year	Christian Bale	Nominated	
London Film Critics' Circle	January 20, 2019	British/Irish Actor of the Year	Christian Bale	Nominated	
Los Angeles Online Film Critics Society	January 9, 2019	Best Actor	Christian Bale	Nominated	
Los Angeles Online Film Critics Society	January 9, 2019	Best Supporting Actress	Amy Adams	Nominated	
Los Angeles Online Film Critics Society	January 9, 2019	Best Original Screenplay	Adam McKay	Won	
Make-Up Artists & Hair Stylists Guild	February 16, 2019	Best Period and/or Character Make-Up, Film	Kate Biscoe; Ann Pala Williams; Jamie Kelman	Won	
Make-Up Artists & Hair Stylists Guild	February 16, 2019	Best Special Make-Up Effects, Film	Greg Cannom; Christopher Gallaher	Won	
New York Film Critics Online	December 9, 2018	Top 10 Films	Vice	Won	
North Carolina Film Office	January 4, 2019	Best Actor	Christian Bale	Nominated	
Online Film Critics Society	January 2, 2019	Best Actor	Christian Bale	Nominated	
Producers Guild of America	January 19, 2019	Best Theatrical Motion Picture	Vice	Nominated	
San Diego Film Critics Society	December 10, 2018	Best Actor	Christian Bale	Nominated	
San Francisco Film Critics Circle Awards	December 9, 2018	Best Screenplay, Original	Adam McKay	Nominated	
San Francisco Film Critics Circle Awards	December 9, 2018	Best Actor	Christian Bale	Nominated	
San Francisco Film Critics Circle Awards	December 9, 2018	Best Supporting Actress	Amy Adams	Nominated	
Screen Actors Guild Awards	January 27, 2019	Outstanding Performance by a Male Actor in a Leading Role	Christian Bale	Nominated	
Screen Actors Guild Awards	January 27, 2019	Outstanding Performance by a Female Actor in a Supporting Role	Amy Adams	Nominated	
Seattle Film Critics Society	December 17, 2018	Best Ensemble Cast	The cast of Vice	Nominated	
St. Louis Film Critics Association	December 17, 2018	Best Film	Vice	Nominated	
St. Louis Film Critics Association	December 17, 2018	Best Director	Adam McKay	Nominated	
St. Louis Film Critics Association	December 17, 2018	Best Actor	Christian Bale	Nominated	
St. Louis Film Critics Association	December 17, 2018	Best Supporting Actress	Amy Adams	Nominated	
St. Louis Film Critics Association	December 17, 2018	Best Supporting Actor	Steve Carell‍‍‌	Nominated	
St. Louis Film Critics Association	December 17, 2018	Best Adapted Screenplay	Adam McKay	Won	
St. Louis Film Critics Association	December 17, 2018	Best Editing	Hank Corwin‍‍‌	Won	
St. Louis Film Critics Association	December 17, 2018	Best Scene	Ending of Vice	Nominated	
Utah Film Critics Association	December 16, 2018	Best Actor	Christian Bale	Nominated	
Vancouver Film Critics Circle	December 17, 2018	Best Actor	Christian Bale	Nominated	
Washington D.C. Area Film Critics Association Award	December 3, 2018	The Joe Barber Award for Best Portrayal of Washington, D.C	Vice	Won	
Washington D.C. Area Film Critics Association Award	December 3, 2018	Best Acting Ensemble	The cast of Vice	Nominated	
Washington D.C. Area Film Critics Association Award	December 3, 2018	Best Actor	Christian Bale	Nominated	
Writers Guild of America	February 17, 2019	Best Original Screenplay	Adam McKay	Nominated	
Writers Guild of America	February 17, 2019	Paul Selvin Award	Adam McKay	Won	

== See also ==
- 2018 in film
