= Dehaney =

Dehaney is a surname. Notable people with the surname include:

- Kadie-Ann Dehaney (born 1996), Jamaican netball player
- Patricia Dehaney, American make-up artist
