= Make-Up Artists & Hair Stylists Guild Awards 2018 =

Entertainment award

- Date: February 16, 2019
- Site: The Beverly Hilton, California

The 2019 Make-Up Artists and Hair Stylists Guild Awards, honoring the best make-up and hairstyling in film and television for 2018, the winners were announced on February 16, 2019 while the nominees were announced on January 10, 2019.

== Winners and nominees ==
=== Feature-Length Motion Picture ===
==== Best Contemporary Make-Up ====
- A Star is Born – Ve Neill, Debbie Zoller, Sarah Tanno
  - Beautiful Boy – Jean Black, Rolf Keppler
  - Boy Erased – Kimberly Jones, Mi Young, Kyra Panchenko
  - Crazy Rich Asians – Heike Merker, Irina Strukova
  - Welcome to Marwen – Ve Neill, Rosalina De Silva
  - Widows – Ma Kalaadevi Ananda, Denise Pugh-Ruiz, Jacqueline Fernandez

==== Best Contemporary Hair Styling ====
- Crazy Rich Asians – Heike Merker, Sophia Knight
  - A Star is Born – Lori McCoy-Bell, Joy Zapata, Frederic Aspires
  - Nappily Ever After – Dawn Turner, Larry Simms
  - Vox Lux – Esther Ahn, Daniel Koye
  - Widows – Linda Flowers, Daniel Curet, Denise Wynbrandt

==== Best Period and/or Character Make-Up ====
- Vice – Kate Biscoe, Ann Pala Williams, Jamie Kelman
  - Bohemian Rhapsody – Jan Sewell, Mark Coulier
  - Mary Poppins Returns – Peter Robb-King, Paula Price
  - Mary Queen of Scots – Jenny Shircore, Hannah Edwards, Sarah Kelly
  - Stan & Ollie – Jeremy Woodhead, Marc Coulier

==== Best Period and/or Character Hair Styling ====
- Mary Queen of Scots - Jenny Shircore, Marc Pilcher
  - Black Panther - Camille Friend, Jaime Leigh McIntosh, Louisa Anthony
  - BlacKkKlansman - LaWanda Pierre-Weston, Shaun Perkins
  - Mary Poppins Returns - Peter Robb-King, Paula Price

==== Best Special Make-Up Effects ====
- Vice – Greg Cannom, Christopher Gallaher
  - Aquaman – Justin Raleigh, Ozzy Alvarez, Sean Genders
  - Black Panther – Joel Harlow, Ken Diaz, Sian Richards
  - Stan & Ollie – Mark Coulier, Jeremy Woodhead
  - The Ballad of Buster Scruggs – Christien Tinsley, Corey Welk, Rolf Keppler

=== Television Series, Miniseries or New Media Series ===
==== Best Contemporary Make-Up ====
- American Horror Story: Apocalypse – Eryn Krueger Mekash, Kim Ayers, Silvina Knight
  - Dancing with the Stars – Julie Socash, Alison Gladieux, Donna Bard
  - Saturday Night Live – Louie Zakarian, Amy Tagliamonti, Jason Milani
  - The Handmaid's Tale – Burton LeBlanc, Talia Reingold, Erika Caceres
  - Westworld – Elisa Marsh, Allan Apone, Rachel Hoke

==== Best Contemporary Hair Styling ====
- Dancing with the Stars – Gail Ryan, Brittany Spaulding, Jani Kleinbard
  - American Horror Story: Apocalypse – Michelle Ceglia, Helena Cepeda, Romaine Markus-Meyers
  - Empire – Melissa Forney, Theresa Fleming, Nolan Kelly
  - Grace and Frankie – Kelly Kline, Jonathan Hanousek, Marlene Williams
  - The Handmaid's Tale – Karola Dirnberger, Ewa Cynk

==== Best Period and/or Character Make-Up ====
- The Marvelous Mrs. Maisel – Patricia Regan, Claus Lulla, Joseph A. Campayno
  - GLOW – Lana Horochowski, Maurine Burke
  - Saturday Night Live – Louie Zakarian, Amy Tagliamonti, Jason Milani
  - Westworld – Elisa Marsh, Allan Apone, Rachel Hoke
  - The Assassination of Gianni Versace: American Crime Story – Robin Beauchesne, Silvina Knight, Ana Lozano

==== Best Period and/or Character Hair Styling ====
- The Marvelous Mrs. Maisel – Jerry DeCarlo, John Jordan, Peg Schierholz
  - American Horror Story: Apocalypse – Michelle Ceglia, Helena Cepeda, Lydia Fantini
  - GLOW – Theraesa Rivers, Valerie Jackson
  - The Assassination of Gianni Versace: American Crime Story – Chris Clark, Natalie Driscoll, Massimo Gattabrusi
  - Vikings – Dee Corcoran, Peter Burke, Zuelika Delaney

==== Best Special Make-Up Effects ====
- Westworld – Justin Raleigh, Kevin Kirkpatrick, Thomas Floutz
  - The Assassination of Gianni Versace: American Crime Story – Michael Mekash, Silvina Knight, David Anderson
  - American Horror Story: Apocalypse – Eryn Krueger Mekash, Mike Mekash, David Anderson
  - Genius: Picasso – Davina Lamont , Goran Lundstrom, Natasha Lees
  - Saturday Night Live – Louie Zakarian, Jason Miliani, Tom Denier Jr.

=== Motion Picture for Television or Special ===
==== Best Contemporary Make-Up ====
- King Lear – Naomi Donne, Sara Kramer
  - A Legendary Christmas – April Chaney, Allison Bryan, Vanessa Dionne
  - 2018 MTV Movie & TV Awards – Dionne Wynn
  - Oprah Winfrey Presents: Becoming Michelle Obama – Derrick Rutledge
  - To All the Boys I've Loved Before – Sharon Toohey, Madison Farwell

==== Best Contemporary Hair Styling ====
- Jesus Christ Superstar Live in Concert – Charles Lapointe, Kevin Maybee
  - The 2018 Rose Parade Hosted by Cord & Tish – Roxxi Dott, Jason Hamer, Candy Neal
  - King Lear – Naomi Donne, Sara Kramer
  - 2018 MTV Video Music Awards – Shawn Finch, Maggie Connolly
  - Oprah Winfrey Presents: Becoming Michelle Obama – Nicole Mangrum

==== Best Special Make-Up Effects ====
- Cocaine Godmother – Trefor Proud, Vicki Syskakis
  - King Lear – Naomi Donne, Sara Kramer
  - Philip K. Dick's Electric Dreams: Crazy Diamond – Kirstin Chalmers, Kristyan Mallett, Satinder Chumber
  - The Royal Wedding Live with Cord and Tish! – Autumn Butler, Jason Hamer, Vincent Van Dyke

=== Daytime Television ===
==== Best Make-Up ====
- The Young and the Restless – Patricia Denney, Marlene Mason, Kathy Jones
  - The Bold and the Beautiful – Christine Lai Johnson, Chris Escobosa, Jennifer Wittman
  - The Price Is Right – Carol Wood, Jason Collins
  - The Real Daytime – Melanie Mills, Glen Alen Gutierrez, Motoko Honjyo Clayton

==== Best Hair Styling ====
- The Young and the Restless – Regina Rodriguez, Adriana Lucio, Vanessa Bragdon
  - The Bold and the Beautiful – Lisa Long, Danielle Spencer, Danielle Dixon
  - The Real Daytime – Roberta Gardener-Rogers, Rachel Mason, Ray Dodson

=== Children and Teen Television Programming ===
==== Best Make-Up ====
- A Series of Unfortunate Events – Rita Ciccozzi, Krista Seller, Bill Terezakis
  - Dancing with the Stars: Juniors – Zena Shteysel Green, Angela Moos, Patti Ramsey Bortoli
  - Henry Danger – Michael Johnston, Patti Brand-Reese, Melanie Mills
  - Sesame Street – Jane DiPersio-Murphy
  - Walk the Prank – Jennifer Aspinall, Ned Neidhardt

==== Best Hair Styling ====
- A Series of Unfortunate Events – Julie McHaffie, Dianne Holme
  - Dancing with the Stars: Juniors – Kimi Messina, Cheryl Eckert, Kim Ferry
  - Henry Danger – Joe Matke, Roma Goddard, Dwayne Ross
  - Lip Sync Battle Shorties – Jerilynn Stephens, Kathleen Leonard, Romy Fleming
  - Sesame Street – Jackie Payne
  - Walk the Prank – Ursula Hawks, Michelle Nyree-Collins

=== Commercials and Music Videos ===
==== Best Make-Up ====
- American Horror Story: Apocalypse "Promo" – Kerry Herta, Jason Collins, Cristina Waltz
  - Capital One "Mona Lisa" – Tania McComas, Leslie Devlin
  - Justin Timberlake – Supplies – Koji Ohmura, Marianna Elias-Tsangaris, Amy Mills
  - Tiffany & Co. – 2018 Spring Campaign: Believe In Dreams – Erin Ayanian-Monroe
  - Venus de Milo On the Go – Wonderful Pistachios – Margaret Prentice, Brian Penikas, Mark Villalobos

==== Best Hair Styling ====
- American Horror Story: Apocalypse "Promo" – Joe Matke, Fernando Santaella-Navarro
  - Capital One "Louisiana Purchase" – Audrey Anzures, Jacklin Masteran, Elizabeth Rabe
  - Capital One "Mona Lisa" – Audrey Anzures, Elizabeth Rabe
  - Justin Timberlake – Supplies – Audrey Futterman-Stern, Tom Opitz
  - Weird Al Yankovic – Weezer "AFRICA" – Sean James Cummins

=== Theatrical Production ===
==== Best Make-Up ====
- The Unauthorized Musical Parody of Rocky Horror – Michael Johnston, Tyson Fontaine, Lauren Lillian
  - A Trip to the Moon – Vanessa Dionne, Jessica Mills, Renee Horner
  - Aladdin – Denise Reynolds, Patrice Madrigal
  - Annie – Vanessa Dionne, Christina Tracey, Brandi Strona
  - Candide – Darren Jinks, Brandi Strona

==== Best Hair Styling ====
- Aladdin – Debra Parr, Michele Arvizo, Chanthy Tach
  - Annie – Vanessa Dionne, Cassie Russek, Donna Levy
  - Blues in the Night – Danielle Richter
  - Love, Actually Live – Cassie Russek, Stephanie Fenner, Irma Nieves
  - Tosca – Jeanna Parham, Ashley Landis

=== Distinguished Artisan Award ===
- Melissa McCarthy

=== Lifetime Achievement Awards ===
- Susan Cabral-Ebert
- Robert Louis Stevenson
