= AACTA International Award for Best Supporting Actor =

Australian film award

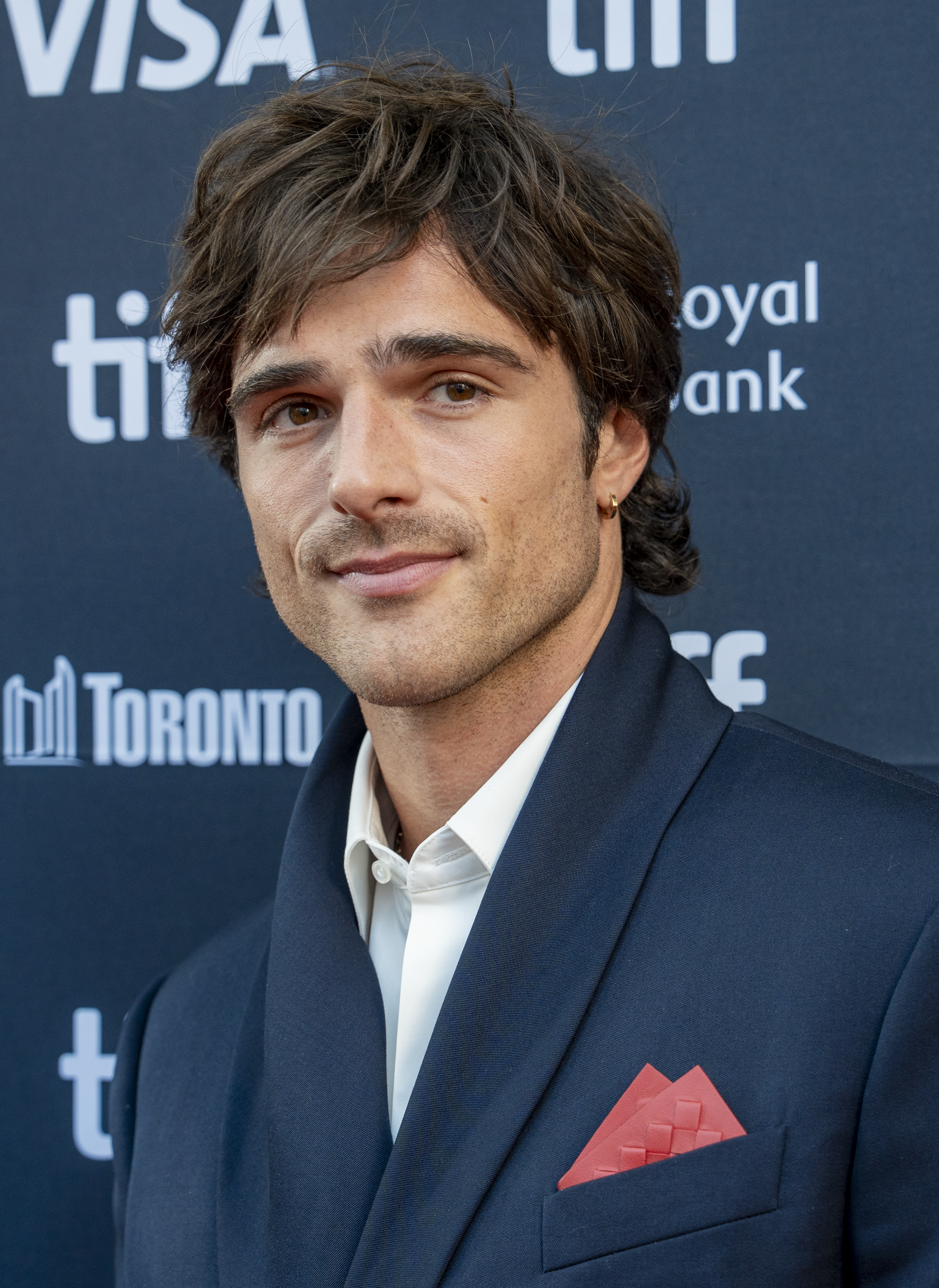
- The 2025 recipient: Jacob Elordi
- Country: Australia
- Presented by: Australian Academy of Cinema and Television Arts (AACTA)
- First award: 2012
- Currently held by: Jacob Elordi, Frankenstein (2025)
- Website: http://www.aacta.org

The AACTA International Award for Best Supporting Actor is an accolade given by the Australian Academy of Cinema and Television Arts (AACTA), a non-profit organisation whose aim is to "identify, award, promote, and celebrate Australia's greatest achievements in film and television". The award is presented at the annual AACTA International Awards, which rewards achievements in feature films, regardless of the country the film was made. The winners and nominees are determined by the international chapter of the Academy, which comprises eighty members of Australian filmmakers and executives. It was first handed out by the Academy in 2013 (for films released in 2012) as a discretionary prize, with Robert De Niro being the first recipient.

== Winners and nominees ==
In the following table, the years listed correspond to the year of film release; the ceremonies are held the following year. The actor in bold and in dark blue background have received a special award; those in bold and in yellow background have won a regular competitive award. Those that are neither highlighted nor in bold are the nominees. When sorted chronologically, the table always lists the winning actor first, and then the other nominees.

Winner of a competitive award
Winner of a discretionary award
- † - indicates a winner of the Academy Award for Best Supporting Actor
- ‡ - indicates a nominee for the Academy Award for Best Supporting Actor

=== 2010s ===
Year	Actor	Film	Role
**2012** (2nd)
**2012** (2nd)	**Robert De Niro** ‡	**Silver Linings Playbook**	**Patrizio "Pat" Solitano, Sr.**
**2013** (3rd)
**2013** (3rd)	**Michael Fassbender** ‡	**12 Years a Slave**	**Edwin Epps**
**2013** (3rd)	Bradley Cooper ‡	American Hustle	Richard "Richie" DiMaso
**2013** (3rd)	Joel Edgerton	The Great Gatsby	Tom Buchanan
**2013** (3rd)	Jared Leto †	Dallas Buyers Club	Rayon
**2013** (3rd)	Geoffrey Rush	The Book Thief	Hans Hubermann
**2014** (4th)
**2014** (4th)	**J. K. Simmons** †	**Whiplash**	**Terence Fletcher**
**2014** (4th)	Ethan Hawke ‡	Boyhood	Mason Evans, Sr.
**2014** (4th)	Edward Norton ‡	Birdman or (The Unexpected Virtue of Ignorance)	Mike Shiner
**2014** (4th)	Mark Ruffalo ‡	Foxcatcher	Dave Schultz
**2014** (4th)	Andy Serkis	Dawn of the Planet of the Apes	Caesar
**2015** (5th)
**2015** (5th)	**Mark Rylance** †	**Bridge of Spies**	**Rudolf Abel**
**2015** (5th)	Christian Bale ‡	The Big Short	Michael Burry
**2015** (5th)	Paul Dano	Love & Mercy	Brian Wilson
**2015** (5th)	Benicio del Toro	Sicario	Alejandro Gillick
**2015** (5th)	Joel Edgerton	Black Mass	John Connolly
**2016** (6th)
**2016** (6th)	**Dev Patel** ‡	**Lion**	**Saroo Brierley**
**2016** (6th)	Mahershala Ali †	Moonlight	Juan
**2016** (6th)	Jeff Bridges ‡	Hell or High Water	Marcus Hamilton
**2016** (6th)	Lucas Hedges ‡	Manchester by the Sea	Patrick Chandler
**2016** (6th)	Michael Shannon ‡	Nocturnal Animals	Detective Bobby Andes
**2017** (7th)
**2017** (7th)	**Sam Rockwell** †	**Three Billboards Outside Ebbing, Missouri**	**Officer Jason Dixon**
**2017** (7th)	Willem Dafoe ‡	The Florida Project	Bobby Hicks
**2017** (7th)	Armie Hammer	Call Me by Your Name	Oliver
**2017** (7th)	Tom Hardy	Dunkirk	Farrier
**2017** (7th)	Ben Mendelsohn	Darkest Hour	King George VI
**2018** (8th)
**2018** (8th)	**Mahershala Ali** †	**Green Book**	**Don Shirley**
**2018** (8th)	Timothée Chalamet	Beautiful Boy	Nic Sheff
**2018** (8th)	Joel Edgerton	Boy Erased	Victor Sykes
**2018** (8th)	Sam Elliott ‡	A Star Is Born	Bobby Maine
**2018** (8th)	Sam Rockwell ‡	Vice	George W. Bush
**2019** (9th)
**2019** (9th)	**Brad Pitt** †	**Once Upon a Time in Hollywood**	**Cliff Booth**
**2019** (9th)	John Lithgow	Bombshell	Roger Ailes
**2019** (9th)	Al Pacino ‡	The Irishman	Jimmy Hoffa
**2019** (9th)	Joe Pesci ‡	The Irishman	Russell Bufalino
**2019** (9th)	Song Kang-ho	Parasite	Kim Ki-taek

=== 2020s ===
Year	Actor	Film	Role
**2020** (10th)
**2020** (10th)	**Sacha Baron Cohen** ‡	**The Trial of the Chicago 7**	**Abbie Hoffman**
**2020** (10th)	Chadwick Boseman	Da 5 Bloods	"Stormin" Norman Earl Holloway
**2020** (10th)	Ben Mendelsohn	Babyteeth	Henry Finlay
**2020** (10th)	Mark Rylance	The Trial of the Chicago 7	William Kunstler
**2020** (10th)	David Strathairn	Nomadland	David
**2021** (11th)
**2021** (11th)	**Kodi Smit-McPhee** ‡	**The Power of the Dog**	**Peter Gordon**
**2021** (11th)	Bradley Cooper	Licorice Pizza	Jon Peters
**2021** (11th)	Jamie Dornan	Belfast	Pa
**2021** (11th)	Ciarán Hinds ‡	Belfast	Pop
**2021** (11th)	Al Pacino	House of Gucci	Aldo Gucci
**2022** (12th)
**2022** (12th)	**Brendan Gleeson** ‡	**The Banshees of Inisherin**	**Colm Doherty**
**2022** (12th)	Woody Harrelson	Triangle of Sadness	The Captain
**2022** (12th)	Sean Harris	The Stranger	Henry Peter Teague / Peter Morley
**2022** (12th)	Brad Pitt	Babylon	Jack Conrad
**2022** (12th)	Ke Huy Quan †	Everything Everywhere All at Once	Waymond Wang
**2023** (13th)
**2023** (13th)	**Ryan Gosling** ‡	**Barbie**	**Ken**
**2023** (13th)	Jacob Elordi	Saltburn	Felix Catton
**2023** (13th)	Matt Damon	Oppenheimer	Gen. Leslie Groves
**2023** (13th)	Robert Downey Jr. †	Oppenheimer	Lewis Strauss
**2023** (13th)	Robert De Niro ‡	Killers of the Flower Moon	William King Hale
**2024** (14th)
**2024** (14th)	**Guy Pearce** ‡	**The Brutalist**	**Harrison Lee Van Buren Sr.**
**2024** (14th)	Kieran Culkin †	A Real Pain	Benji Kaplan
**2024** (14th)	Damon Herriman	Better Man	Nigel Martin-Smith
**2024** (14th)	Stanley Tucci	Conclave	Cardinal Aldo Bellini
**2024** (14th)	Denzel Washington	Gladiator II	Macrinus
**2025** (15th)
**2025** (15th)	**Jacob Elordi** ‡	**Frankenstein**	**The Creature**
**2025** (15th)	Benicio del Toro ‡	One Battle After Another	Sergio St. Carlos
**2025** (15th)	Paul Mescal	Hamnet	William Shakespeare
**2025** (15th)	Dacre Montgomery	Dead Man's Wire	Richard Hall
**2025** (15th)	Sean Penn †	One Battle After Another	Col. Steven J. Lockjaw

== See also ==
- AACTA Awards
- AACTA Award for Best Actor in a Supporting Role
