= Kate Biscoe =

American make-up artist

- Born: Kate Morgan; New York City
- Education: McGill University, French language and literature (Bachelor of Arts)
- Occupation: Make-Up artist
- Notable credits: Behind the Candelabra; The Royal Tenenbaums; Vice
- Awards: For Behind the Candelabra: Primetime Emmy Award for Outstanding Makeup for a Miniseries or a Movie (Non-Prosthetic), 65th Primetime Creative Arts Emmy Awards; Primetime Emmy Award for Outstanding Prosthetic Makeup for a Series, Miniseries, Movie or a Special, 65th Primetime Creative Arts Emmy Awards; For The Royal Tenenbaums: Make-Up Artists & Hair Stylists Guild Award for Best Period and/or Character Make-Up in a Feature-Length Motion Picture, Make-Up and Hair Stylists Guild Awards 2002, with Naomi Donne; For Vice: Academy Award for Best Makeup and Hairstyling, 91st Academy Awards, with Greg Cannom and Patricia Dehaney; Make-Up Artists and Hair Stylists Guild Award for Best Period and/or Character Make-Up in a Feature-Length Motion Picture, Make-Up Artists & Hair Stylists Guild Awards 2018, with Ann Pala Williams and Jamie Kelman; Best Make-Up and Hair, Gold Derby Awards, with Greg Cannom and Patricia Dehaney

Kate Morgan Biscoe is an American make-up artist. She won an Academy Award in the category Best Makeup and Hairstyling for the film Vice.

She was born in New York City to Jean Sargent Morgan and David M. Morgan, and has two sons. She attended McGill University beginning in 1988, but left in 1992 without completing her degree. Biscoe moved to Los Angeles in 1995.

She returned to McGill to study French language and literature, graduating in 2016. She has an interest in Haitian literature.

== Film work ==
She started her career as a hair stylist on Sling Blade. Following that, Biscoe worked as the make-up artist on Arresting Gena. She worked on Bedazzled in 2000, for which she was nominated for the Make-Up Artists & Hair Stylists Guild Award for Best Contemporary Make-Up in a Feature-Length Motion Picture alongside Cheri Minns and Ben Nye, Jr. She received another nomination for the same award for her work on Zoolander, alongside Naomi Donne and Michael Laudati. Biscoe and Donne won the MUAHS Guild Award for Best Period and/or Character Make-Up in a Feature-Length Motion Picture for their work in The Royal Tenenbaums.

In 2002, Biscoe was the personal make-up artist for Lisa Kudrow on Analyze That. She was the key make-up, and personal artist for Beyoncé on Austin Powers in Goldmember. She worked as a member of the make-up department on Master and Commander: The Far Side of the World in 2003. She was the head of the make-up department on Meet the Fockers in 2004.

Biscoe was nominated for the Gold Derby Award for Best Make-Up and Hair for her work on Memoirs of a Geisha, as well as the BAFTA Award for Best Makeup and Hair in 2006.

She handled the make-up for Factory Girl in 2006, and for the films Tell-Tale and A Single Man in 2009. In 2012, Biscoe headed the make-up department for The Master. She also did the make-up artistry on Argo.

She was the head of the make-up department for the television film Behind the Candelabra. Biscoe and Deborah Rutherford were nominated for the MUAHS Guild Award for Best Period and/or Character Make-Up in a Television Series, Television Limited or Miniseries or Television New Media Series in 2014. The pair also won the Primetime Emmy Award for Outstanding Makeup for a Miniseries or a Movie (Non-Prosthetic) alongside Deborah La Mia Denaver, Chrissie Beveridge, and Todd Kleitsch at the 65th Primetime Creative Arts Emmy Awards. Alongside Christine Beveridge, Hiroshi Yada, Jamie Kelman, Stephen Kelley, Todd Kleitsch, and Christien Tinsley, Biscoe won the Primetime Emmy Award for Outstanding Prosthetic Makeup for a Series, Miniseries, Movie or a Special also at the 65th Primetime Creative Arts Emmy Awards. Biscoe and Marie Larkin were nominated for the BAFTA Award for Best Makeup and Hair in 2014 as well.

Biscoe was the head of the make-up department on for Gone Girl. For her work on the film, she was nominated for the 2015 MUAHS Guild Award for Best Contemporary Make-Up in a Feature-Length Motion Picture again, alongside Gigi Williams.

Biscoe worked on make-up for Batman v Superman: Dawn of Justice in 2016 and Justice League in 2017.

Biscoe was the make-up department head on Vice, responsible for 130 members of the cast. The department consisted of 17 additional artists. For her work on the film, she won the MUAHS Guild Award for Best Contemporary Make-Up in a Feature-Length Motion Picture again in 2019, alongside Ann Pala Williams and Jamie Kelman. Biscoe, Greg Cannom, and Patricia Dehaney won both the Gold Derby Award for Best Make-Up and Hair, and the Academy Award for Best Makeup and Hairstyling. The trio were nominated for the Gold Derby Film Decade Awards for the 2010s.

Biscoe, Cannom, Dehaney, and Chris Gallaher were also nominated for the BAFTA Award for Best Makeup and Hair in 2019, as well as the Latino Entertainment Journalists Association Best Hair and Make-Up Award. Biscoe was co-nominated for the Chicago Independent Film Critics Circle for Best Costume Design and Make-Up alongside Susan Matheson, Biscoe for Make-Up and Matheson for costumes.

She headed the make-up department on Godzilla vs. Kong in 2020.

== Television series work ==
On the miniseries Sharp Objects, Biscoe worked as the personal make-up artist to Amy Adams. She was nominated for the Primetime Emmy Award for Outstanding Makeup (Non-Prosthetic) alongside Michelle Radow, Karen Rentrop, and Eric Rosenmann for their work on the show.

Biscoe was the head of the make-up department on the television miniseries Angelyne, and was nominated alongside Vincent Van Dyke, Mike Mekash, and Abby Lyle Clawson for the MUAHS Guild Award for Best Special Makeup Effects in Television, Limited/Miniseries, or New Media Series. They, along with Chris Burgoyne, were also nominated for the Primetime Emmy Award for Outstanding Prosthetic Makeup for their work on the Angelyne episode "Glow In The Dark Queen Of The Universe".

She was also the head of the make-up department on the horror drama series Grotesquerie, and along with Victor Del Castillo, Naima Jamal, and Tierra Richards, was nominated for a Primetime Emmy Award for Outstanding Makeup (Non-Prosthetic) for the episode "Unplugged". The quartet was also nominated for the MUAHS Guild's Best Contemporary Make-Up, TV Series, TV Limited or Miniseries, TV New Media award.

Her work on the television series All's Fair resulted in a nomination for Outstanding Make-up (TV or Film) at the 57th NAACP Image Awards.

== Selected credits ==
Select notable films
Year	Title	Accolades	Recipient	Result	Ref.
2018	Vice	Academy Award for Best Makeup and Hairstyling	Kate Biscoe; Greg Cannom; Patricia Dehaney	Won	
2018	Vice	BAFTA Award for Best Makeup and Hair	Kate Biscoe; Greg Cannom; Patricia Dehaney; Chris Gallaher	Nominated	
2018	Vice	Chicago Independent Film Critics Circle for Best Costume Design and Make-Up	Susan Matheson (Costumes); Kate Biscoe (Make-Up)	Nominated	
2018	Vice	Gold Derby Award for Best Make-Up and Hair	Kate Biscoe; Greg Cannom; Patricia Dehaney	Won	
2018	Vice	Gold Derby Film 2010s Decade Awards for Best Make-Up and Hair	Kate Biscoe; Greg Cannom; Patricia Dehaney	Nominated	
2018	Vice	Latino Entertainment Journalists Association Best Hair and Make-Up Award	Kate Biscoe; Greg Cannom; Patricia Dehaney; Chris Gallaher	Nominated	
2018	Vice	MUAHS Guild's Best Period and/or Character Make-Up, Film	Kate Biscoe; Jamie Kelman; Ana Pala Williams	Won	
2014	Gone Girl	MUAHS Guild's Best Period and/or Character Make-Up, Film	Kate Biscoe; Gigi Williams	Nominated	
2013	Behind the Candelabra	BAFTA Award for Best Makeup and Hair	Kate Biscoe; Marie Larkin	Nominated	
2013	Behind the Candelabra	MUAHS Guild's Best Period and/or Character Make-Up, TV Limited, Miniseries, or New Media	Kate Biscoe; Deborah Rutherford	Nominated	
2013	Behind the Candelabra	Primetime Emmy Award for Outstanding Makeup for a Miniseries or a Movie (Non-Prosthetic)	Chrissie Beveridge; Kate Biscoe; Todd Kleitsch; Deborah La Mia Denaver; Deborah Rutherford	Won	
2013	Behind the Candelabra	Primetime Emmy Award for Outstanding Prosthetic Makeup for a Series, Miniseries, Movie or a Special	Christine Beveridge; Kate Biscoe; Hiroshi Yada; Stephen Kelley; Jamie Kelman; Todd Kleitsch; Christien Tinsley	Won	
2005	Memoirs of a Geisha	BAFTA Award for Best Makeup and Hair	Kate Biscoe; Lyndell Quiyou; Kelvin R Trahan; Noriko Watanabe	Nominated	
2005	Memoirs of a Geisha	Gold Derby Award for Best Make-Up and Hair	Kate Biscoe	Nominated	
2002	The Royal Tenenbaums	MUAHS Guild's Best Period and/or Character Make-Up, Film	Kate Biscoe; Naomi Donne	Won	
2001	Zoolander	MUAHS Guild's Best Contemporary Make-Up, Film	Kate Biscoe; Naomi Donne; Michael Laudati	Nominated	
2000	Bedazzled	MUAHS Guild's Best Contemporary Make-Up, Film	Kate Biscoe; Cheri Minns; Ben Nye, Jr.	Nominated	

Select notable TV series
Year	Series	Accolades	Recipient	Result	Ref.
2025	All's Fair	NAACP Image Awards's Outstanding Make-up (TV or Film)	Kate Biscoe	Nominated	
2024	Grotesquerie	MUAHS Guild's Best Contemporary Make-Up, TV Series, TV Limited or Miniseries, TV New Media	Kate Biscoe; Victor Del Castillo; Naima Jamal; Tierra Richards	Nominated	
2024	Grotesquerie	Primetime Emmy Award for Outstanding Contemporary Makeup (Non-Prosthetic)	Kate Biscoe; Victor Del Castillo; Naima Jamal; Tierra Richards	Nominated	
2022	Angelyne	MUAHS Guild's Best Special Makeup Effects, TV, Limited, Miniseries, or New Media	Kate Biscoe; Abby Lyle Clawson; Mike Mekash; Vincent Van Dyke	Nominated	
2022	Angelyne	Primetime Emmy Award for Outstanding Prosthetic Makeup	Kate Biscoe; Chris Burgoyne; Abby Lyle Clawson; Mike Mekash; Vincent Van Dyke	Nominated	
2018	Sharp Objects	Primetime Emmy Award for Outstanding Makeup for a Limited Series or Movie (Non-Prosthetic)	Kate Biscoe; Michelle Radow; Karen Rentrop; Eric Rosenmann	Nominated	

== Sources ==
- "2005 Gold Derby Film Awards". Gold Derby Awards. 2005.
- "2013 – 65th Emmy Awards: Outstanding Makeup For A Miniseries Or A Movie (Non-Prosthetic)". Academy of Television Arts & Sciences. 2013.
- "2013 – 65th Emmy Awards: Outstanding Prosthetic Makeup For A Series, Miniseries, Movie Or A Special". Academy of Television Arts & Sciences. 2013.
- "2019 – 71st Emmy Awards: Outstanding Makeup For A Limited Series Or Movie (Non-Prosthetic)". Academy of Television Arts & Sciences. 2019.
- "28 Emmy Wins! Congratulations to all our 2013 Primetime Emmy winners!". Variety. Vol. 321, no. 12. September 17, 2013. p. 6.
- "The 91st Academy Awards (2019) Nominees and Winners". Academy of Motion Picture Arts and Sciences. April 15, 2019.
- "BAFTA Film: Make-Up And Hair in 2006". British Academy of Film and Television Arts. 2006. Archived from the original on February 27, 2014.
- "BAFTA Film: Make-Up And Hair in 2014". British Academy of Film and Television Arts. 2014. Archived from the original on January 19, 2014.
- "BAFTA Nominees". Variety. February 13, 2006. Gale A142385987.
- "Cinematography, makeup, hair winners list". United Press International. February 19, 2002.
- Festival de Venise 2012. Lion d'Argent - Meilleur Réalisateur. Coupe volpi - Meilleurs Acteurs. The Master (The Master), Metropolitan Filmexport, January 9, 2013
- "Film Awards: 2019 Results". British Academy of Film and Television Arts. 2019. Archived from the original on July 20, 2019.
- "Local 706 Announces Nominees for 2014 Guild Awards". Make-Up Artist Magazine. January 28, 2014 [January 15, 2014]. Archived from the original on February 28, 2017 – via Trove.
- "Make-Up Artists and Hair Stylists Guild Local 706 Congratulates 65th Prime Time Emmy Winners". Variety. Vol. 321, no. 12. September 17, 2013. p. 77.
- Bennett, Anita; N'Duka, Amanda (February 16, 2019). "'Vice', 'Mrs. Maisel' Among Make-Up Artists & Hair Stylists Guild Awards Winners". Deadline Hollywood.
- Bentley, Jean (August 5, 2018). "Amy Adams' 'Sharp Objects' Makeup Artists Explain How They Created Her Scars". The Hollywood Reporter.
- Biscoe, Kate (October 3, 2014). "Gone Girl's Makeup Artist On The Movie's Dark Beauty". Allure (Interview). Interviewed by Lexi Novak.
- Biscoe, Kate; Van Dyke, Vincent (August 9, 2022). "Angelyne Prosthetic Designer Vincent Van Dyke & Makeup Dept. Head Kate Biscoe on Transforming Emmy Rossum Into LA's Pink-Hued Princess". Below the Line. Media and Entertainment (Interview). Interviewed by Robin Milling.
- Chatterjee, Pramit (March 31, 2021). "'Godzilla Vs. Kong' Review: Adam Wingard's Movie About A Monkey And A Lizard Roars On All Cylinders Non-stop". Mashable India.
- Coyle, Jake (February 25, 2019). "'Green Book' wins best picture in an upset at the Oscars". APNews.
- De Leon, David (May 20, 2019). "Profile: David De Leon". On Makeup Magazine (Interview). Interviewed by Michael DeVellis.
- Essman, Scott (February 22, 2019). "Oscar Contender - Kate Biscoe, Makeup for Vice". Below the Line. Media and Entertainment.
- Feiwell, Jill (January 17, 2002). "20th, U pix make hair, makeup cut". Variety. Archived from the original on December 29, 2018.
- Gaydos, Steven (February 11, 2014). "5 ways the BAFTAS differ from the Oscars". Variety. Gale A360473435.
- Giardina, Carolyn (January 8, 2015). "'Guardians of the Galaxy,' 'Into the Woods' Lead Make-Up Artists and Hair Stylists Guild Nominations". The Hollywood Reporter.
- Giardina, Carolyn (February 24, 2019). "'Vice' Wins Makeup and Hairstyling Oscar; Greg Cannom Says "If the Makeup Didn't Work, the Film Wouldn't Work"". The Hollywood Reporter.
- Gleisser, Benjamin (April 2019). "Famous faces are her canvas". McGill News. McGill University. Archived from the original on February 14, 2024.
- Grant, Edmond; Fox, Ken; Joseph, Andrew, eds. (1998). The Motion Picture Guide 1998 Annual (The Films of 1997). New York: Cinebooks. ISBN 0-933997-41-8. LCCN 85-71145.
- Grein, Paul (March 1, 2026). "Here Are All the Winners at the 2026 NAACP Image Awards: Full Winners List". Billboard.
- Kinnersley, Hannah (July 16, 2025). "Congratulations To The 2025 Creative Arts Emmy Nominees". Live Design.
- Marcadé, Nicolas, ed. (2011). L'Annuel du Cinéma 2011: Tous les filmes de 2010 [Movie Yearbook 2011: All the films of 2010] (in French). Paris: Fiches du Cinéma. ISBN 978-2-902-51619-3.
- Marcadé, Nicolas, ed. (2013). L'Annuel du Cinéma 2013: Tous les filmes de 2012 [Movie Yearbook 2013: All the films of 2012] (in French). Paris: Fiches du Cinéma. ISBN 978-2-902-51622-3.
- McNary, Dave (February 6, 2001). "Heady Competish: Guild touches up noms for hair, makeup". Variety. Vol. 270, no. 47. p. 5.
- Montgomery, Daniel; Dixon, Marcus James; Beachum, Chris; Eng, Joyce (February 20, 2019). "Gold Derby Film Awards winners 2019: 'The Favourite' is the biggest champ, but 'Roma' takes Best Picture". Gold Derby.
- Montgomery, Daniel; Dixon, Marcus James; Beachum, Chris; Eng, Joyce; Laws, Zach (March 10, 2020). "'Parasite' sweeps Gold Derby Film Decade Awards (2010-2019), but 15 other films honored; Amy Adams triumphs as top performer". Gold Derby.
- Neglia, Matt (January 20, 2019). "The 2018 Latino Entertainment Journalists Association (LEJA) Winners". Net Best Picture.
- Neglia, Matt (February 3, 2019). "The 2018 Chicago Independent Film Critics Circle (CIFCC) Winners". Next Best Picture.
- Noble, Matt (August 4, 2022). "'Angelyne' makeup artists Kate Biscoe and David Williams on creating 'different versions of the truth' [Exclusive Video Interview]". Gold Derby.
- Nordine, Michael (January 21, 2019). "'Roma' Wins Nine Prizes From Latino Entertainment Journalists Association". IndieWire.
- Ortiz, Jen (2018). "How The 'Sharp Objects' Makeup Artist Made Amy Adams Look So Hungover All the Time". Cosmopolitan. Archived from the original on July 23, 2018.
- Pécora, Luísa (February 18, 2019). "Veja as mulheres indicadas ao Oscar de cabelo e maquiagem" [See the women nominated for the Hair and Make-Up Oscar]. Mulher no Cinema (in Portuguese).
- Pedersen, Erik (February 24, 2019). "Make-Up & Hair Styling Oscar Winner 'Vice' Turned Christian Bale Into The Many Faces Of Dick Cheney". Deadline Hollywood.
- Pedersen, Erik (January 11, 2023). "Make-Up Artists & Hair Stylists Guild Awards Nominations: 'The Batman', 'Elvis', 'The Whale' & More". Deadline Hollywood.
- Schneider, Michael (July 12, 2022). "Emmys 2022: The Complete Nominations List". Variety.
- Schwartz, Missy (December 10, 2024). "'Beetlejuice Beetlejuice,' 'SNL' Lead Make-Up Artists and Hair Stylists Guild Awards Nominees". TheWrap.
- Svitil, Torene, ed. (2003). Annual Index to Motion Picture Credits, 2002 Edition. Beverly Hills: Academy of Motion Picture Arts and Sciences. ISBN 0-942102-43-6. ISSN 0163-5123.
- Svitil, Torene, ed. (2004). Annual Index to Motion Picture Credits, 2003 Edition. Beverly Hills: Academy of Motion Picture Arts and Sciences. ISBN 0-942102-45-2. ISSN 0163-5123.
- Tarr, Ashley (November 22, 2011). "North Salem Resident Dies". Patch Media. Archived from the original on January 7, 2015.
- Thornton, Billy Bob (1996). Sling Blade a screenplay. New York: Miramax Books. p. 158. ISBN 0-7868-8250-6.
- Todisco, Eric (September 14, 2019). "Creative Arts Emmys 2019: See the Full List of Winners". People.
- Willis, John; Monush, Barry (2010). Screen World: The Films of 2006. Vol. 58. New York: Applause Theatre & Cinema Books. ISBN 978-1-55783-729-5. ISSN 1545-9020.
