= 72nd British Academy Film Awards =

2019 film award ceremony

- Date: 10 February 2019
- Site: Royal Albert Hall, London
- Hosted by: Joanna Lumley

Highlights
- Best Film: Roma
- Best British Film: The Favourite
- Best Actor: Rami Malek; Bohemian Rhapsody
- Best Actress: Olivia Colman; The Favourite
- Most awards: The Favourite (7)
- Most nominations: The Favourite (12)

The 72nd British Academy Film Awards, more commonly known as the BAFTAs, were held on 10 February 2019 at the Royal Albert Hall in London, honouring the best national and foreign films of 2018. Presented by the British Academy of Film and Television Arts, accolades were handed out for the best feature-length film and documentaries of any nationality that were screened at British cinemas in 2018.

The nominees were announced on 9 January 2019 by actor Will Poulter and actress Hayley Squires. The period comedy-drama The Favourite received the most nominations: twelve across eleven categories.

English actress Joanna Lumley hosted the ceremony for the second consecutive year.

== Winners and nominees ==
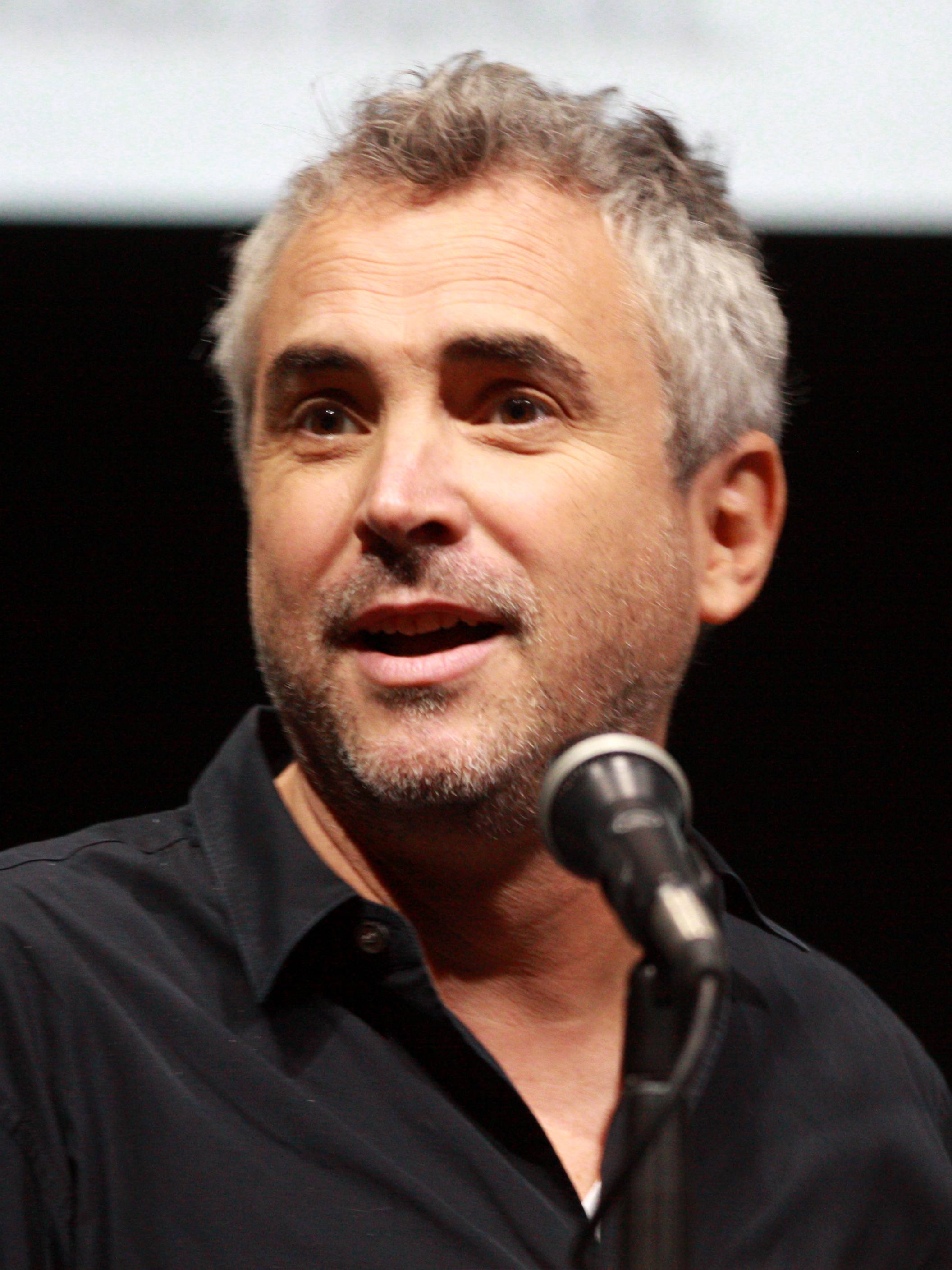
Alfonso Cuarón, Best Film co-winner, Best Director winner, Best Cinematography winner and Best Film Not in the English Language co-winner

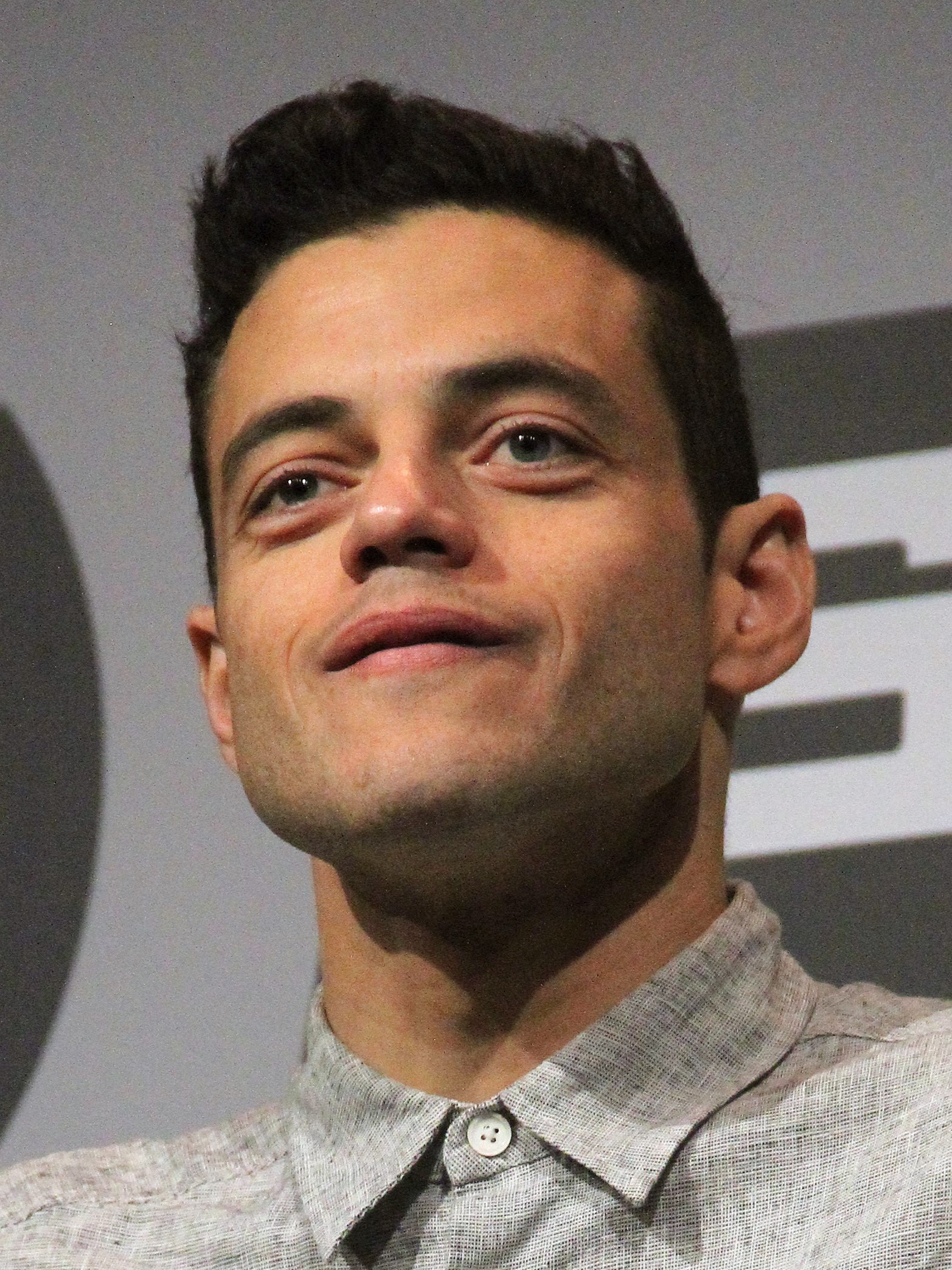
Rami Malek, Best Actor winner

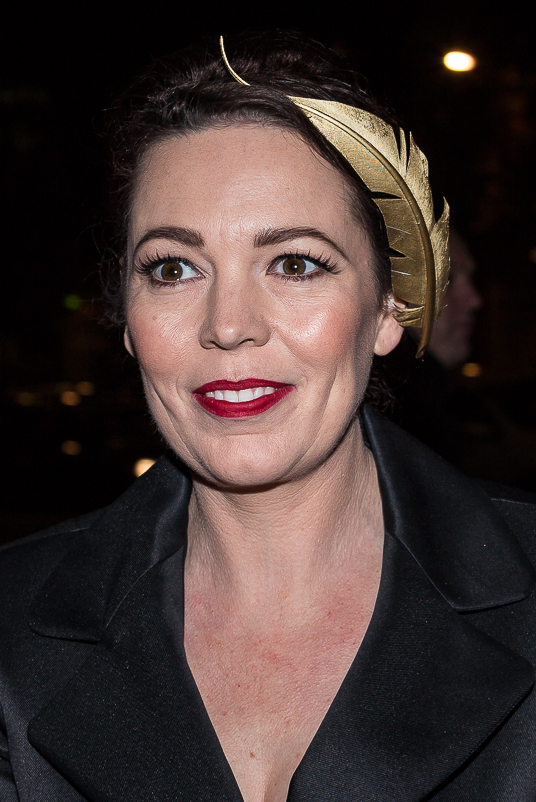
Olivia Colman, Best Actress winner

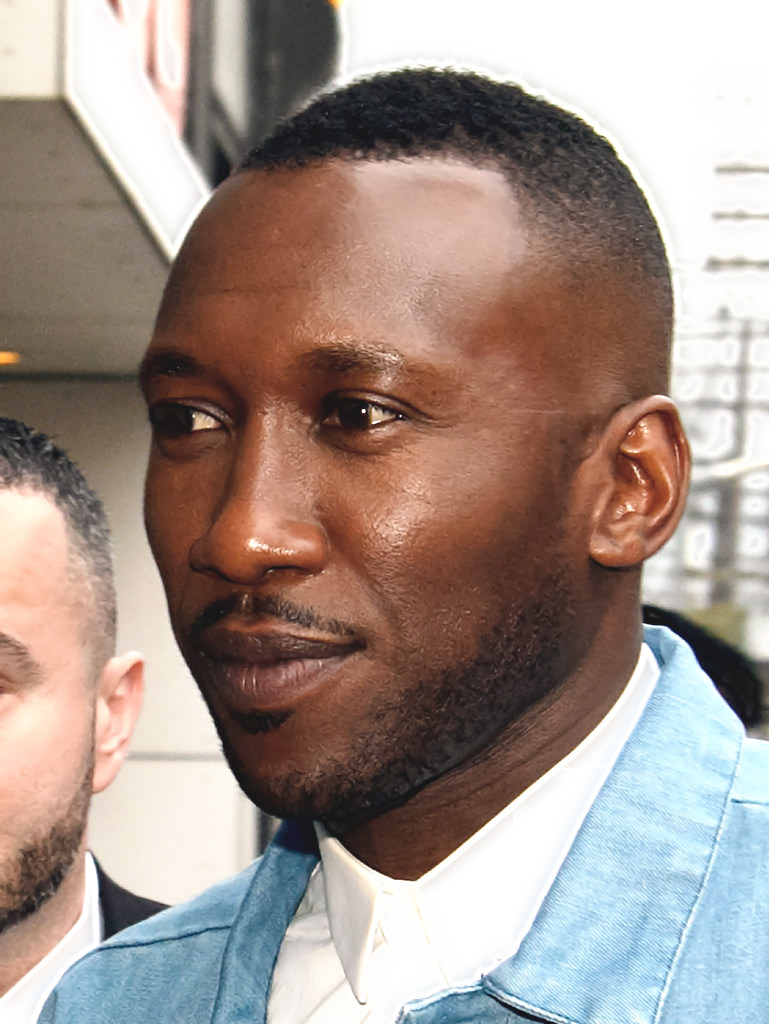
Mahershala Ali, Best Supporting Actor winner

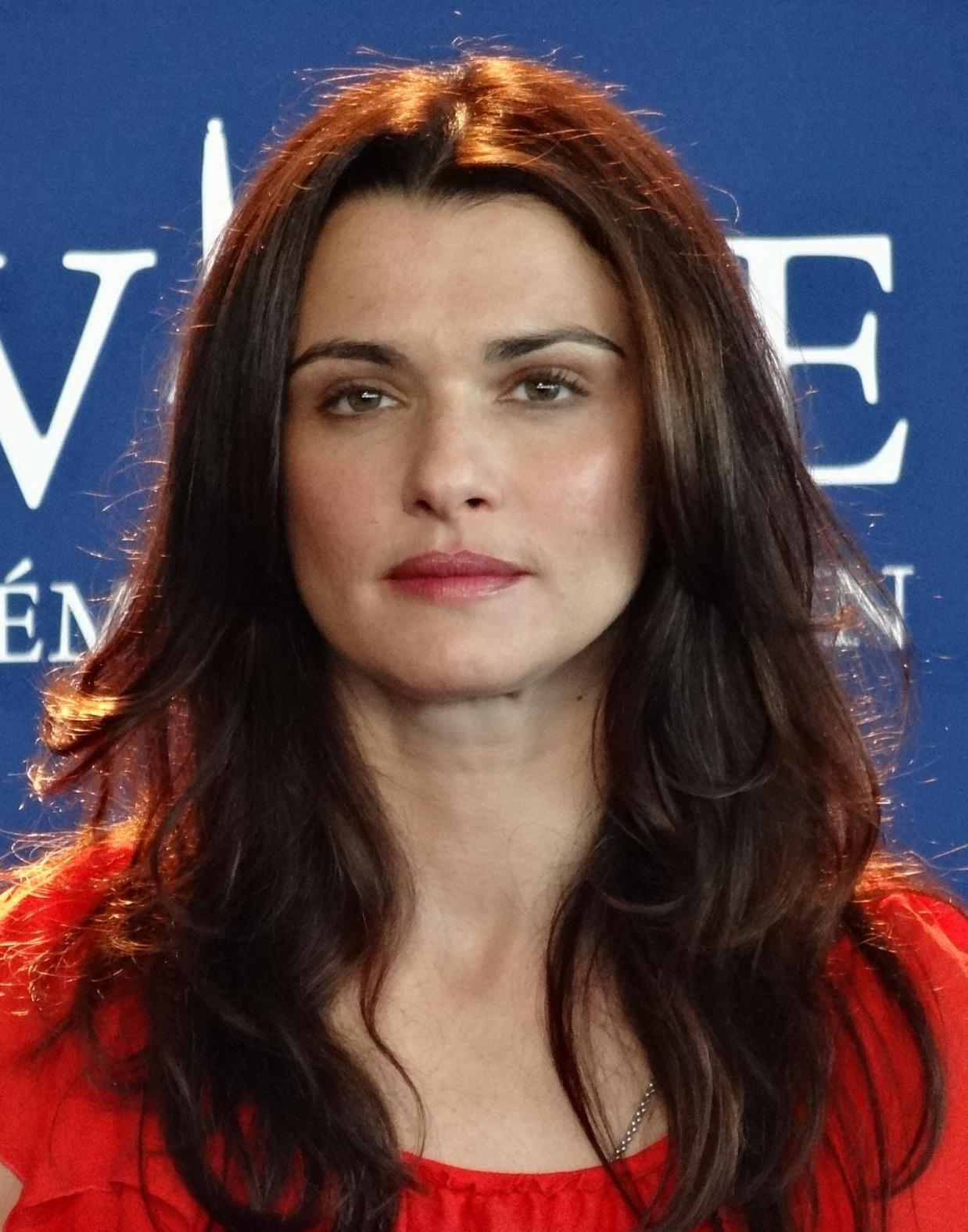
Rachel Weisz, Best Supporting Actress winner

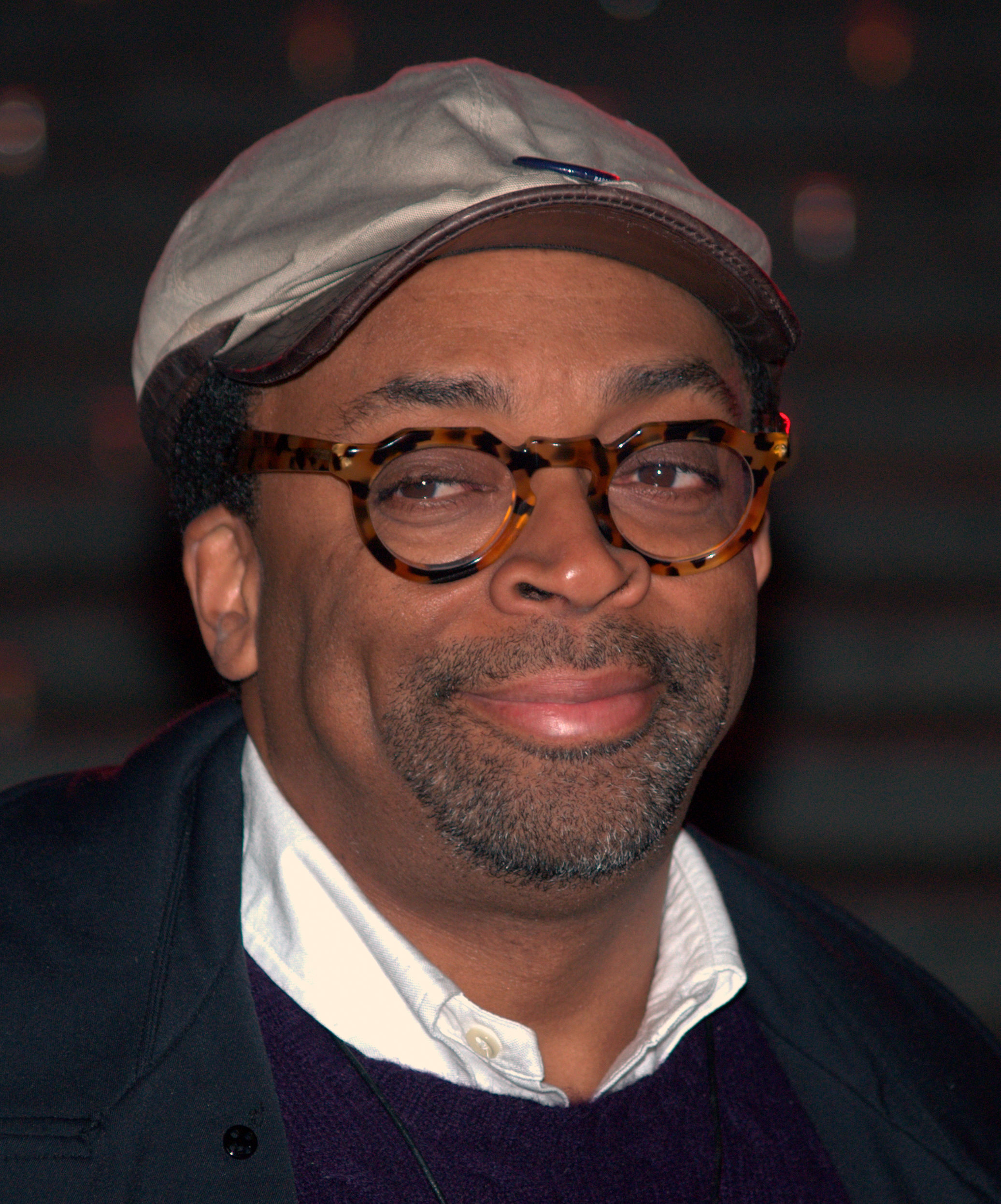
Spike Lee, Best Adapted Screenplay co-winner

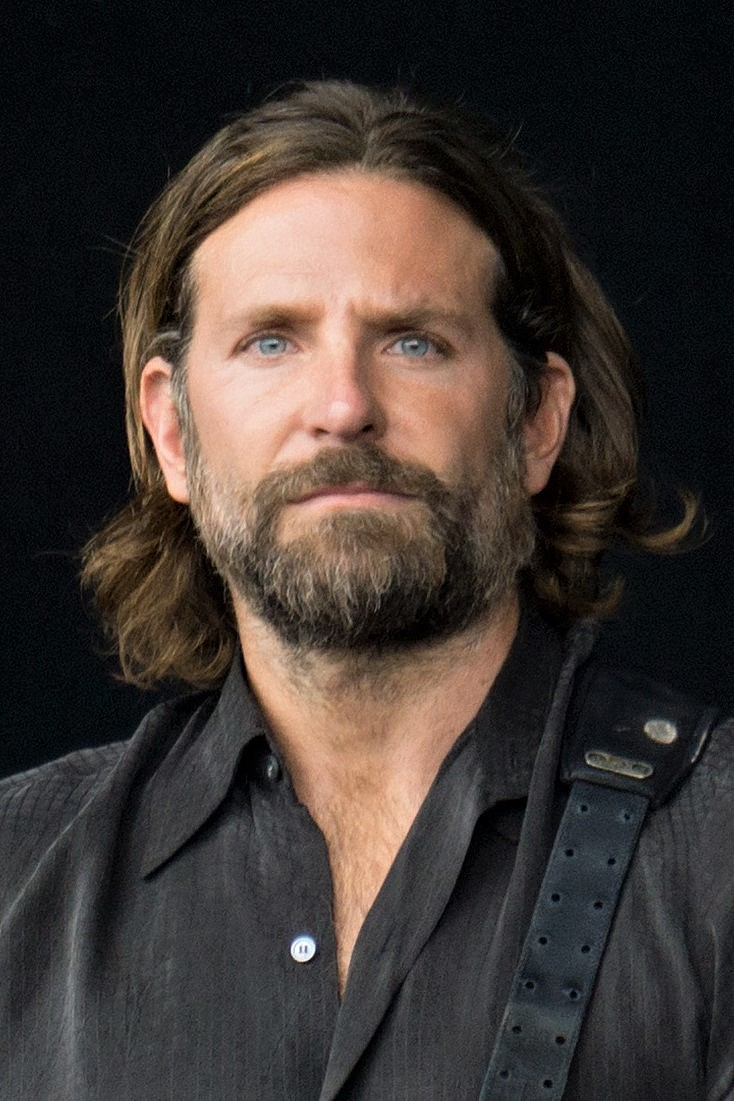
Bradley Cooper, Best Original Music co-winner

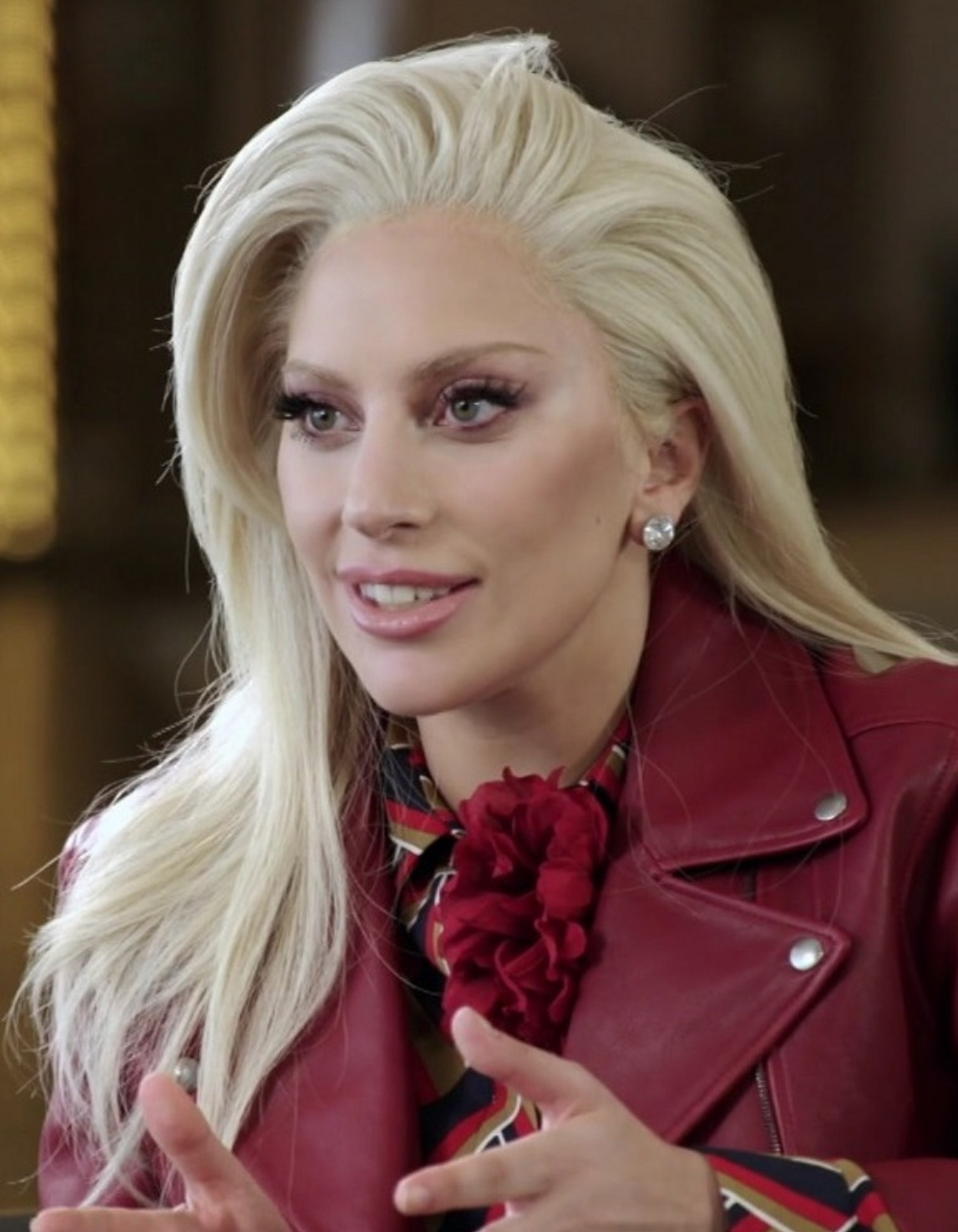
Lady Gaga, Best Original Music co-winner

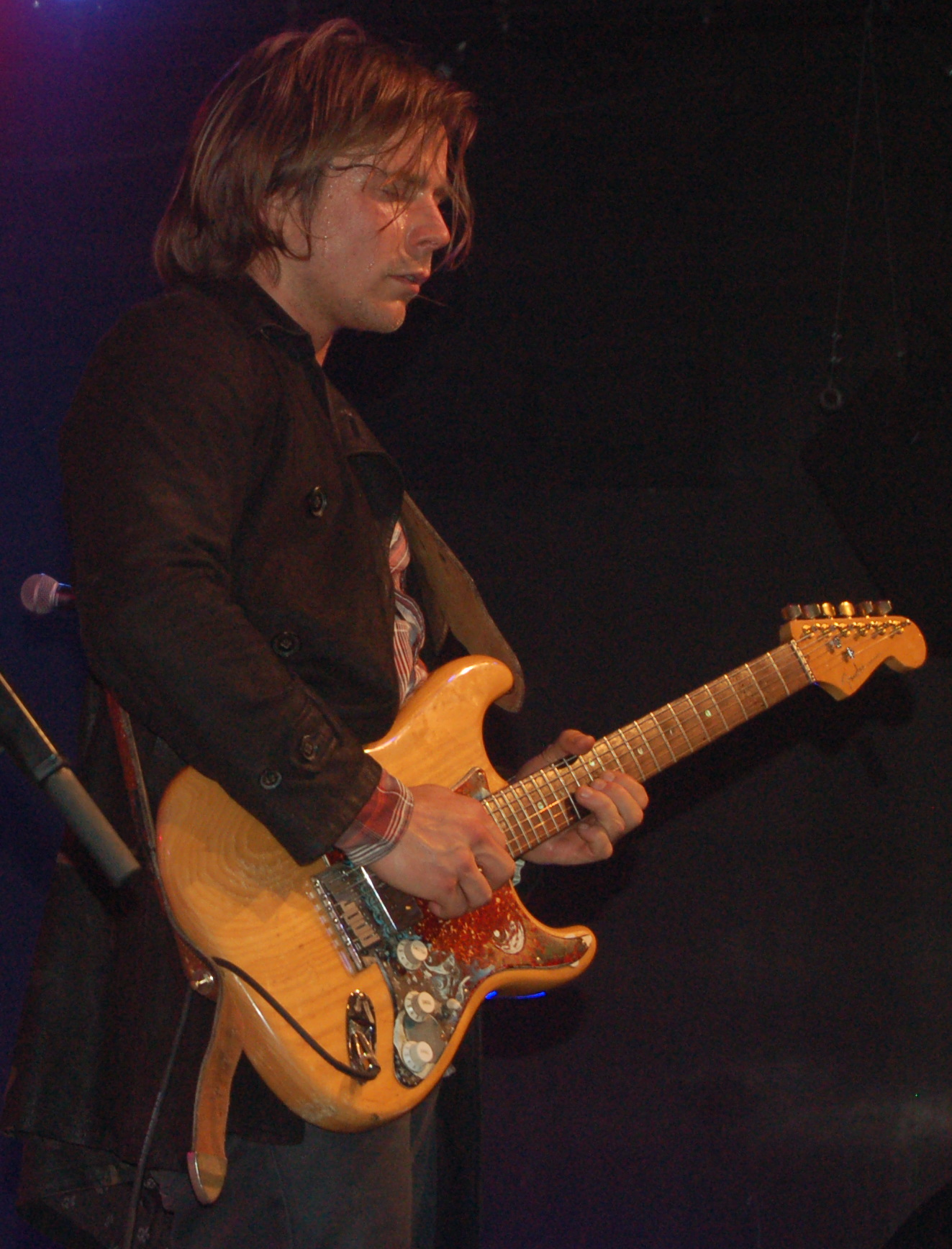
Lukas Nelson, Best Original Music co-winner

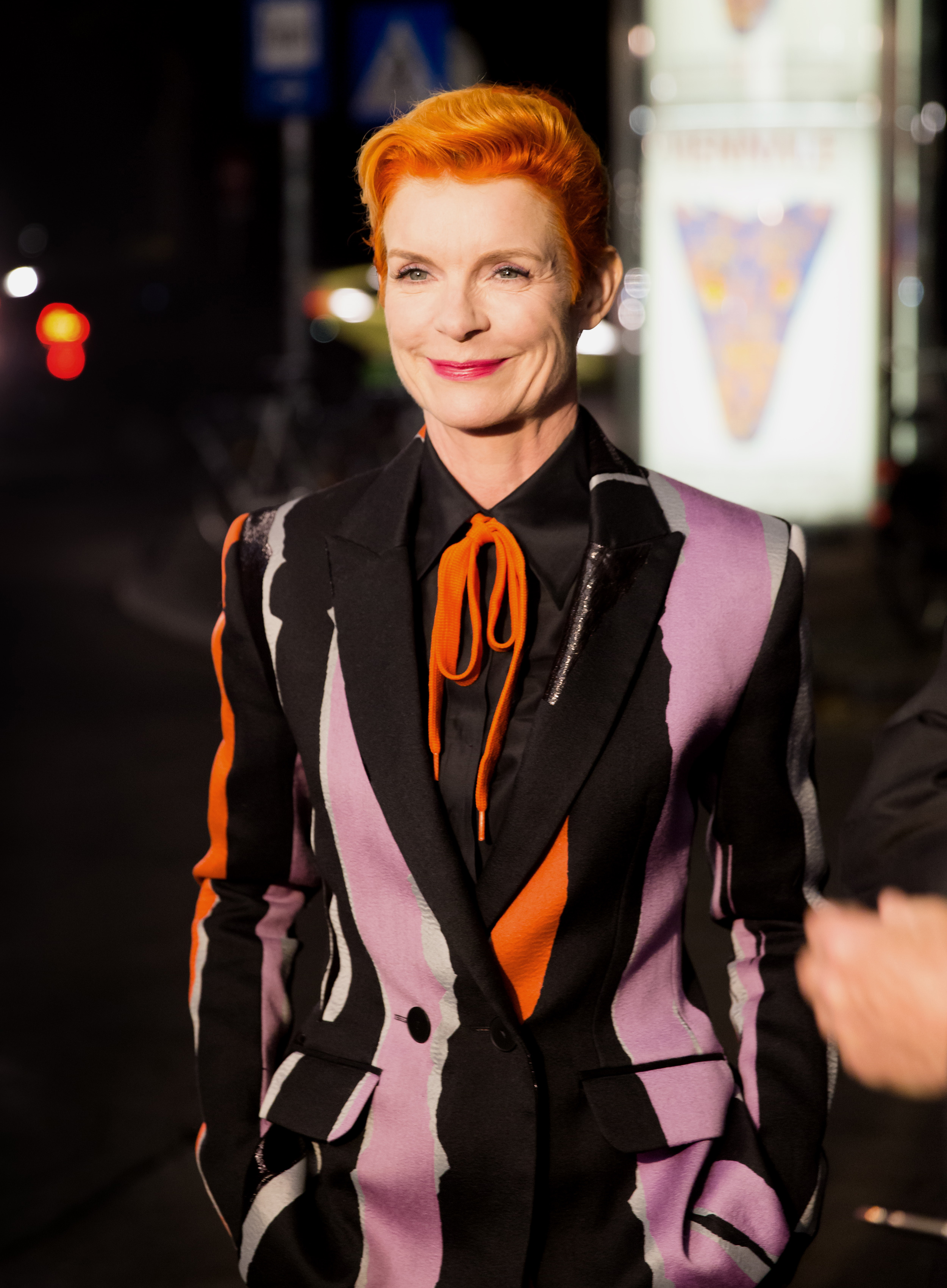
Sandy Powell, Best Costume Design winner

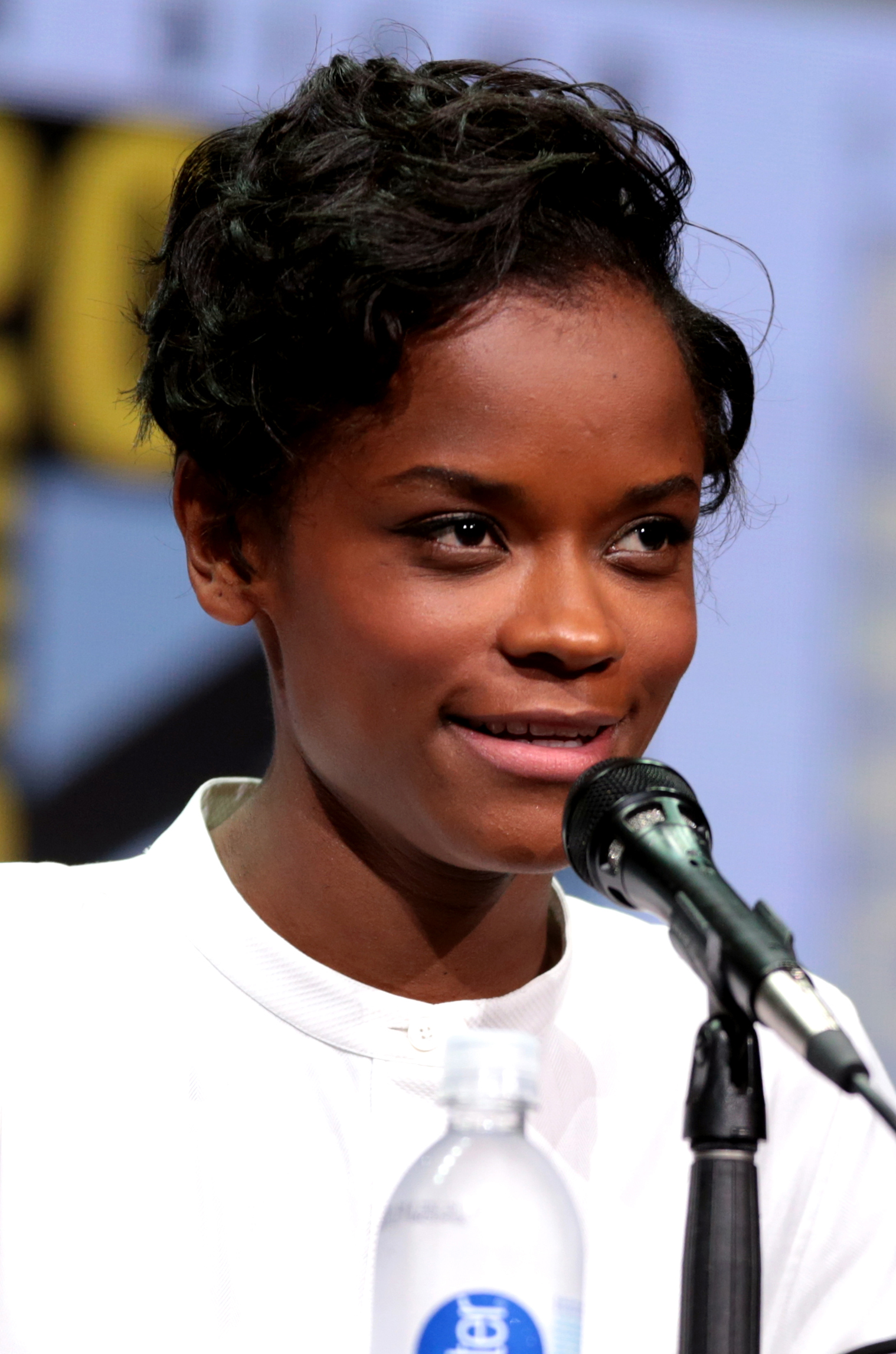
Letitia Wright, EE Rising Star Award winner

The nominees were announced on 9 January 2019. The winners were announced on 10 February 2019.

On 6 February 2019, BAFTA announced they had suspended Bryan Singer's name from Bohemian Rhapsody's nomination for Outstanding British Film following accusations against Singer concerning sexual abuse.

=== BAFTA Fellowship ===
- Thelma Schoonmaker

=== Outstanding British Contribution to Cinema ===
- Elizabeth Karlsen and Stephen Woolley for Number 9 Films

Best Film: Roma – Alfonso Cuarón and Gabriela Rodríguez; BlacKkKlansman – Jason Blum, Spike Lee, Raymond Mansfield, Sean McKittrick and Jordan Peele; The Favourite – Ceci Dempsey, Ed Guiney, Yorgos Lanthimos and Lee Magiday; Green Book – Jim Burke, Brian Currie, Peter Farrelly, Nick Vallelonga and Charles B. Wessler; A Star Is Born – Bradley Cooper, Bill Gerber and Lynette Howell Taylor	Best Direction: Alfonso Cuarón – Roma; Bradley Cooper – A Star Is Born; Yorgos Lanthimos – The Favourite; Spike Lee – BlacKkKlansman; Paweł Pawlikowski – Cold War
Best Actor in a Leading Role: Rami Malek – Bohemian Rhapsody as Freddie Mercury; Christian Bale – Vice as Dick Cheney; Steve Coogan – Stan & Ollie as Stan Laurel; Bradley Cooper – A Star Is Born as Jackson Maine; Viggo Mortensen – Green Book as Tony Lip	Best Actress in a Leading Role: Olivia Colman – The Favourite as Anne; Glenn Close – The Wife as Joan Castleman; Viola Davis – Widows as Veronica Rawlings; Lady Gaga – A Star Is Born as Ally Maine; Melissa McCarthy – Can You Ever Forgive Me? as Lee Israel
Best Actor in a Supporting Role: Mahershala Ali – Green Book as Don Shirley; Timothée Chalamet – Beautiful Boy as Nic Sheff; Adam Driver – BlacKkKlansman as Philip Zimmerman; Richard E. Grant – Can You Ever Forgive Me? as Jack Hock; Sam Rockwell – Vice as George W. Bush	Best Actress in a Supporting Role: Rachel Weisz – The Favourite as Sarah Churchill; Amy Adams – Vice as Lynne Cheney; Claire Foy – First Man as Janet Armstrong; Margot Robbie – Mary Queen of Scots as Elizabeth I; Emma Stone – The Favourite as Abigail Masham
Best Original Screenplay: The Favourite – Deborah Davis and Tony McNamara; Cold War – Janusz Głowacki and Paweł Pawlikowski; Green Book – Brian Currie, Peter Farrelly and Nick Vallelonga; Roma – Alfonso Cuarón; Vice – Adam McKay	Best Adapted Screenplay: BlacKkKlansman – Spike Lee, David Rabinowitz, Charlie Wachtel and Kevin Willmott; Can You Ever Forgive Me? – Nicole Holofcener and Jeff Whitty; First Man – Josh Singer; If Beale Street Could Talk – Barry Jenkins; A Star Is Born – Bradley Cooper, Will Fetters and Eric Roth
Best Cinematography: Roma – Alfonso Cuarón; Bohemian Rhapsody – Newton Thomas Sigel; Cold War – Łukasz Żal; The Favourite – Robbie Ryan; First Man – Linus Sandgren	Best Costume Design: The Favourite – Sandy Powell; The Ballad of Buster Scruggs – Mary Zophres; Bohemian Rhapsody – Julian Day; Mary Poppins Returns – Sandy Powell; Mary Queen of Scots – Alexandra Byrne
Best Editing: Vice – Hank Corwin; Bohemian Rhapsody – John Ottman; The Favourite – Yorgos Mavropsaridis; First Man – Tom Cross; Roma – Alfonso Cuarón and Adam Gough	Best Makeup and Hair: The Favourite – Nadia Stacey; Bohemian Rhapsody – Mark Coulier and Jan Sewell; Mary Queen of Scots – Jenny Shircore; Stan & Ollie – Mark Coulier, Jeremy Woodhead and Josh Weston; Vice – Kate Biscoe, Greg Cannom, Patricia DeHaney and Chris Gallaher
Best Original Music: A Star Is Born – Bradley Cooper, Lady Gaga and Lukas Nelson; BlacKkKlansman – Terence Blanchard; If Beale Street Could Talk – Nicholas Britell; Isle of Dogs – Alexandre Desplat; Mary Poppins Returns – Marc Shaiman	Best Production Design: The Favourite – Fiona Crombie and Alice Felton; Fantastic Beasts: The Crimes of Grindelwald – Stuart Craig and Anna Pinnock; First Man – Nathan Crowley and Kathy Lucas; Mary Poppins Returns – John Myhre and Gordon Sim; Roma – Eugenio Caballero and Barbara Enriquez
Best Sound: Bohemian Rhapsody – John Casail, Tim Cavagin, Nina Hartstone, Paul Massey and John Warhurst; First Man – Mary H. Ellis, Mildred Iatrou Morgan, Ai-Ling Lee, Frank A. Montaño and Jon Taylor; Mission: Impossible – Fallout – Gilbert Lake, James H. Mather, Chris Munro and Mike Prestwood Smith; A Quiet Place – Erik Aadahl, Michael Barosky, Brandon Proctor and Ethan Van der Ryn; A Star Is Born – Steven A. Morrow, Alan Robert Murray, Jason Ruder, Tom Ozanich and Dean A. Zupancic	Best Special Visual Effects: Black Panther – Geoffrey Baumann, Jesse James Chisholm, Craig Hammack and Dan Sudick; Avengers: Infinity War – Dan DeLeeuw, Russell Earl, Kelly Port and Dan Sudick; Fantastic Beasts: The Crimes of Grindelwald – Tim Burke, Andy Kind, Christian Manz and David Watkins; First Man – Ian Hunter, Paul Lambert, Tristan Myles and J. D. Schwalm; Ready Player One – Matthew E. Butler, Grady Cofer, Roger Guyett and Dave Shirk
Outstanding British Film: The Favourite – Yorgos Lanthimos, Ceci Dempsey, Ed Guiney, Lee Magiday, Deborah Davis and Tony McNamara; Beast – Michael Pearce, Kristian Brodie, Lauren Dark and Ivana Mackinnon; Bohemian Rhapsody – Graham King and Anthony McCarten; McQueen – Ian Bonhôte, Peter Ettedgui, Andee Ryder and Nick Taussing; Stan & Ollie – Jon S. Baird, Faye Ward and Jeff Pope; You Were Never Really Here – Lynne Ramsay, Rosa Attab, Pascal Caucheteux and James Wilson	Outstanding Debut by a British Writer, Director or Producer: Beast – Michael Pearce (Writer/Director) and Lauren Dark (Producer); Apostasy – Daniel Kokotajlo (director) (Writer/Director); A Cambodian Spring – Chris Kelly (Writer/Director/Producer); Pili – Leanne Welham (Writer/Director) and Sophie Harman (Producer); Ray & Liz – Richard Billingham (Writer/Director) and Jacqui Davies (Producer)
Best Short Animation: Roughhouse – Jonathan Hodgson and Richard Van Den Boom; I'm OK – Elizabeth Hobbs, Abigail Addison and Jelena Popovic; Marfa – Greg McLeod and Myles McLeod	Best Short Film: 73 Cows – Alex Lockwood; Bachelor, 38 – Angela Clarke; The Blue Door – Ben Clark, Megan Pugh and Paul Taylor; The Field – Sandhya Suri, Thomas Bidegain and Balthazar de Ganay; Wale – Barnaby Blackburn, Sophie Alexander, Catherine Slater and Ed Speleers
Best Animated Film: Spider-Man: Into the Spider-Verse – Bob Persichetti, Peter Ramsey, Rodney Rothman and Phil Lord; Incredibles 2 – Brad Bird and John Walker; Isle of Dogs – Wes Anderson and Jeremy Dawson	Best Documentary: Free Solo – Elizabeth Chai Vasarhelyi, Jimmy Chin, Shannon Dill and Evan Hayes; McQueen – Ian Bonhôte and Peter Ettedgui; RBG – Julie Cohen and Betsy West; They Shall Not Grow Old – Peter Jackson and Clare Olssen; Three Identical Strangers – Tim Wardie, Grace Hughes-Hallett and Becky Read
Best Film Not in the English Language: Roma – Alfonso Cuarón and Gabriela Rodríguez; Capernaum – Nadine Labaki and Khaled Mouzanar; Cold War – Paweł Pawlikowski, Tanya Seghatchian and Ewa Puszczynska; Dogman – Matteo Garrone; Shoplifters – Hirokazu Kore-eda and Kaoru Matsuzaki	Rising Star Award: Letitia Wright; Jessie Buckley; Cynthia Erivo; Barry Keoghan; Lakeith Stanfield

== Ceremony information ==
The ceremony took place at the Royal Albert Hall and was hosted by English actress Joanna Lumley for the second consecutive year. In a reference to the controversy surrounding Kevin Hart's removal as host of the 91st Academy Awards, Lumley said that she suspects she probably would not have been hosting the ceremony if she were on Twitter. It opened with a performance from Cirque du Soleil for the third consecutive year and was broadcast after a short delay on BBC One.

The period comedy-drama The Favourite received the most nominations with twelve and won seven, including Outstanding British Film, Best Actress in a Leading Role for Olivia Colman, and Best Actress in a Supporting Role for Rachel Weisz. Roma won four awards, including Best Film and Best Director for Alfonso Cuarón. Rami Malek won Best Actor in a Leading Role for Bohemian Rhapsody, thanking Freddie Mercury in his acceptance speech.

The In Memoriam section paid tribute to those who had died during the previous year, including Albert Finney, William Goldman, Penny Marshall, Burt Reynolds and Nicolas Roeg. The segment was accompanied by saxophonist Jess Gillam, who performed "(Where Do I Begin?) Love Story", the title song from the film Love Story, as composed by Francis Lai, who also was featured in the tribute. Thelma Schoonmaker won the BAFTA Fellowship, presented by Cate Blanchett and Prince William. She joined the fellowship along with her late husband Michael Powell and long-term collaborator Martin Scorsese. Elizabeth Karlsen and Stephen Woolley won the BAFTA Outstanding British Contribution to Cinema Award for their contributions to Number 9 Films.

== Statistics ==
Films that received multiple nominations
Nominations	Film
12	The Favourite
7	Bohemian Rhapsody
7	First Man
7	Roma
7	A Star Is Born
6	Vice
5	BlacKkKlansman
4	Cold War
4	Green Book
3	Can You Ever Forgive Me?
3	Mary Poppins Returns
3	Mary Queen of Scots
3	Stan & Ollie
2	Beast
2	Fantastic Beasts: The Crimes of Grindelwald
2	If Beale Street Could Talk
2	Isle of Dogs
2	McQueen

Films that received multiple awards
Awards	Film
7	The Favourite
4	Roma
2	Bohemian Rhapsody

== Presenters ==
- Melissa McCarthy presented Outstanding British Film
- Lily Collins and Olga Kurylenko presented Best Animated Film and Best Production Design
- Jason Isaacs presented Best British Short Animation
- Henry Golding and Eleanor Tomlinson presented Best Sound and Best Editing
- Lucy Boynton and Joseph Fiennes presented Best Documentary and Best Hair and Makeup
- Bill Nighy presented the BAFTA Outstanding British Contribution to Cinema Award
- Mary J. Blige and Elliot Page presented Best Actress in a Supporting Role
- Luke Evans and Regina King presented the EE Rising Star Award
- Yalitza Aparicio and Marina de Tavira presented Best Adapted Screenplay
- Danai Gurira and Andy Serkis presented Best Original Music
- Elizabeth Debicki and Michelle Rodriguez presented Best Original Screenplay
- Viola Davis presented Best Actor in a Supporting Role
- Will Poulter and Michelle Yeoh presented Best Cinematography
- Riz Ahmed and Rachel Brosnahan presented Outstanding Debut by a British Writer, Director or Producer
- Jamie Bell, Taron Egerton, and Richard Madden presented Best Special Visual Effects
- Thandie Newton and Sophie Okonedo presented Best Film Not in the English Language
- Cynthia Erivo and Eddie Marsan presented Best Costume Design
- Salma Hayek presented Best Director
- Gary Oldman presented Best Actress in a Leading Role
- Margot Robbie presented Best Actor in a Leading Role
- Chiwetel Ejiofor presented Best Film
- Cate Blanchett and Prince William presented the BAFTA Fellowship

== In Memoriam ==
- Albert Finney
- Fenella Fielding
- Anne V. Coates
- Michael Anderson
- Robbie Little
- Samuel Hadida
- Neil Simon
- Isao Takahata
- Nicolas Roeg
- Linda Gregory
- Ronnie Taylor
- Michel Legrand
- Andrew G. Vajna
- Francis Lai
- Bernardo Bertolucci
- John Chambers
- William Goldman
- Stan Lee
- Michael Seymour
- Lewis Gilbert
- Miloš Forman
- Tab Hunter
- Penny Marshall
- Margot Kidder
- Yvonne Blake
- Liz Fraser
- Michael D. Ford
- Burt Reynolds

== See also ==
- 8th AACTA International Awards
- 91st Academy Awards
- 44th César Awards
- 24th Critics' Choice Awards
- 71st Directors Guild of America Awards
- 32nd European Film Awards
- 76th Golden Globe Awards
- 39th Golden Raspberry Awards
- 33rd Goya Awards
- 34th Independent Spirit Awards
- 24th Lumière Awards
- 9th Magritte Awards
- 6th Platino Awards
- 30th Producers Guild of America Awards
- 23rd Satellite Awards
- 45th Saturn Awards
- 25th Screen Actors Guild Awards
- 71st Writers Guild of America Awards
