= Nicole Mangrum =

American hairstylist (born 1974)

Nicole Mangrum (born November 16, 1974, in Chicago, Illinois) is a hairstylist based in the United States who has been nominated for three Make-Up Artists Hairstylists Guild Awards. She is best known for being the personal hairstylist of Oprah Winfrey, since 2015. Other notable celebrity clients of Mangrum's have included Michelle Obama, Gayle King, Mellody Hobson, Valerie Jarrett, Sanaa Lathan, Kelly Rowland and Michelle Williams amongst others.

After attending beauty school, Mangrum began working as a hairstylist and opened a salon in downtown Chicago, which she ran for 14 years. When Oprah's former hairstylist Andre Walker was looking to retire, he was referred to Nicole Mangrum through a mutual friend. Oprah invited Mangrum to do her hair for several Super Soul Sunday episodes. After seven months, Nicole joined Oprah's team as her full-time hair stylist.

For her work on the Super Soul Sunday series and Oprah Winfrey Presents: Becoming Michelle Obama, Mangrum has been nominated for three Make-Up Artists Hairstylists Guild Awards in 2017, 2018, and 2019. Mangrum is credited with creating the pink and purple ponytail on the February 2018 cover of O, The Oprah Magazine.
