= Hank Corwin =

American film editor

- Occupation: Film editor

Hank Corwin is an American film editor. He has been nominated for three Oscars for editing the films The Big Short (2015), Vice (2018), and Don't Look Up (2021). In addition, he has been nominated for two BAFTA Awards for Best Editing. Other notable works include Natural Born Killers (1994), The Horse Whisperer (1998), and The Tree of Life (2011).

== Filmography ==
=== As an editor ===
Year	Film	Notes
TBA	The Exiles	
2023	The Creator	
2022	Winning Time: The Rise of the Lakers Dynasty	Season 1 Episode 1
2021	Don't Look Up	
2018	Vice	
2017	Song to Song	
2015	The Big Short	
2014	After the Fall	
2013	Making a Scene	Short film
2013	Jimi: All Is by My Side	
2011	Luck	Season 1 Episode 1
2011	The Tree of Life	
2009	Undone	Short film
2008	What Just Happened	
2005	The New World	
2000	The Legend of Bagger Vance	
1999	Snow Falling on Cedars	
1998	The Horse Whisperer	
1997	U Turn	
1995	Nixon	
1994	Natural Born Killers	

=== Other credits ===
- 2019: Ad Astra (consulting editor)
- 2011: Moneyball (additional editor)
- 2009: Public Enemies (additional editor)
- 2003: Poem: I Set My Feet Upon the Air and It Carries Me (guest editor)
- 1999: Snow Falling on Cedars (sound designer)
- 1998: Why Do Fools Fall in Love (additional editor)
- 1997: Fast, Cheap & Out of Control (Documentary) (additional editor)
- 1994: Natural Born Killers (actor, Headless Figure / Mickey's Dad Demon)
- 1991: JFK (additional editor)

== Accolades ==
Year Ceremony	Category	Nominated work	Recipients	Result
March 27, 2022; 94th Academy Awards	Best Film Editing	Don't Look Up		Nominated
February 24, 2018; 91st Academy Awards	Best Film Editing	Vice		Nominated
February 10, 2018; 72nd British Academy Film Awards	Best Editing	Vice		Won
February 28, 2016; 88th Academy Awards	Best Film Editing	The Big Short		Nominated
February 14, 2016; 69th British Academy Film Awards	Best Editing	The Big Short		Nominated
2016; 10th Alliance of Women Film Journalists EDA Awards	Best Editing	The Big Short		Nominated
2012; 6th Alliance of Women Film Journalists EDA Awards	Best Editing	The Tree of Life	Shared with: Jay Rabinowitz; Daniel Rezende; Billy Weber; Mark Yoshikawa	Nominated
January 29, 2016; 66th ACE Eddie Awards	Best Edited Feature Film – Comedy or Musical	The Big Short		Won
March 13, 1999; 49th ACE Eddie Awards	Best Edited Feature Film – Dramatic	The Horse Whisperer	Shared with: Tom Rolf; Freeman A. Davies	Nominated
January 17, 2016; 21st CCA Awards	Best Editing	The Big Short		Nominated
December 16, 2015; 28th CFCA Awards	Best Editing	The Big Short		Nominated
January 2, 2012; 15th OFS Awards	Best Editing	The Tree of Life	Shared with: Jay Rabinowitz; Daniel Rezende; Billy Weber; Mark Yoshikawa	Won
December 19, 2011; 24th CFCA Awards	Best Editing	The Tree of Life	Shared with: Jay Rabinowitz; Daniel Rezende; Billy Weber; Mark Yoshikawa	Nominated
December 14, 2011; 16th SDFCS Awards	Best Editing	The Tree of Life	Shared with: Jay Rabinowitz; Daniel Rezende; Billy Weber; Mark Yoshikawa	Nominated
December 12, 2015; 14th SFFCC Awards	Best Editing	The Big Short		Nominated

=== Other ===
- 2015: Seattle Film Critics Awards – The Big Short – Best Editing (nominated)
- 2015: St. Louis Film Critics Association – The Big Short – Best Editing (nominated)
- 2012: International Cinephile Society Awards – The Tree of Life – Best Editing (nominated)
- 2012: Italian Online Movie Awards – The Tree of Life – Best Editing (Miglior montaggio) (nominated)
- 2011: Online Film & Television Association – The Tree of Life – Best Editing (nominated)
- 2011: Phoenix Film Critics Society Awards – The Tree of Life – Best Editing (nominated)
- 1997: MTV Video Music Award for Best Editing – "Devils Haircut" by Beck (won)
