= Patricia Dehaney =

American make-up artist

- Occupation: Make-up artist

Patricia Dehaney is an American make-up artist. She won an Academy Award and was nominated for another one in the category Best Makeup and Hairstyling for the films Vice and Hillbilly Elegy.

== Selected filmography ==
- Vice (2018; co-won with Greg Cannom and Kate Biscoe)
- Hillbilly Elegy (2020; co-nominated with Eryn Krueger Mekash and Matthew W. Mungle)
