= 8th AACTA International Awards =

2018 Australia film industry award

The 8th Australian Academy of Cinema and Television Arts International Awards (commonly known as the AACTA International Awards) is presented by the Australian Academy of Cinema and Television Arts (AACTA), a non-profit organisation whose aim is to identify, award, promote and celebrate Australia's greatest achievements in film and television. Awards were handed out for the best films of 2018 regardless of the country of origin, and are the international counterpart to the awards for Australian films.

== Nominees ==
Best Film: Roma; A Star Is Born; BlacKkKlansman; Bohemian Rhapsody; Vice	Best Direction: Alfonso Cuarón – Roma; Bradley Cooper – A Star Is Born; Spike Lee – BlacKkKlansman; Yorgos Lanthimos – The Favourite; Warwick Thornton – Sweet Country
Best Actor: Rami Malek – Bohemian Rhapsody as Freddie Mercury; Christian Bale – Vice as Dick Cheney; Bradley Cooper – A Star Is Born as Jackson Maine; Hugh Jackman – The Front Runner as Gary Hart; Viggo Mortensen – Green Book as Frank "Tony Lip" Vallelonga	Best Actress: Olivia Colman – The Favourite as Queen Anne; Glenn Close – The Wife as Joan Castleman; Toni Collette – Hereditary as Annie Graham; Lady Gaga – A Star Is Born as Ally Maine; Nicole Kidman – Destroyer as Erin Bell
Best Supporting Actor: Mahershala Ali – Green Book as "Doc" Don Shirley; Timothée Chalamet – Beautiful Boy as Nicholas "Nic" Sheff; Joel Edgerton – Boy Erased as Victor Sykes; Sam Elliott – A Star Is Born as Bobby Maine; Sam Rockwell – Vice as George W. Bush	Best Supporting Actress: Nicole Kidman – Boy Erased as Nancy Eamons; Amy Adams – Vice as Lynne Cheney; Emily Blunt – A Quiet Place as Evelyn Abbott; Claire Foy – First Man as Janet Armstrong; Margot Robbie – Mary Queen of Scots as Queen Elizabeth I
Best Screenplay: Deborah Davis, Tony McNamara – The Favourite; John Krasinski, Bryan Woods, Scott Beck – A Quiet Place; Spike Lee, David Rabinowitz, Charlie Wachtel, Kevin Willmott – BlacKkKlansman; Anthony McCarten – Bohemian Rhapsody; Alfonso Cuarón – Roma
