= Vice (2018 film) =

American film by Adam McKay

- Theatrical release poster
- Directed by: Adam McKay
- Written by: Adam McKay
- Produced by: Brad Pitt; Dede Gardner; Jeremy Kleiner; Megan Ellison; Kevin Messick; Will Ferrell; Adam McKay
- Starring: Christian Bale; Amy Adams; Steve Carell; Tyler Perry; Alison Pill; Lily Rabe; Sam Rockwell
- Narrated by: Jesse Plemons
- Cinematography: Greig Fraser
- Edited by: Hank Corwin
- Music by: Nicholas Britell
- Production companies: Annapurna Pictures; Plan B Entertainment; Gary Sanchez Productions
- Distributed by: Annapurna Pictures
- Release dates: December 11, 2018 (Samuel Goldwyn Theater); December 25, 2018 (United States)
- Running time: 132 minutes
- Country: United States
- Language: English
- Budget: $60 million
- Box office: $76.1 million

Vice is a 2018 American biographical black comedy film based on the life of Dick Cheney, the 46th vice president of the United States. Directed, written, and produced by Adam McKay, it stars Christian Bale as Cheney. The supporting cast includes Amy Adams, Steve Carell, Sam Rockwell, Justin Kirk, Tyler Perry, Alison Pill, Lily Rabe, and Jesse Plemons. The film follows Cheney on his path to becoming the most powerful vice president in American history, presented with political satire elements.

Vice was released in the United States on December 25, 2018, by Annapurna Pictures, and grossed $76.1 million worldwide and was considered a box office flop against its $60 million budget. While the performances were universally acclaimed, the film polarized critics; some considered it to be one of the best films of the year while others thought it to be one of the worst, with McKay's screenplay and direction receiving both "scathing critiques and celebratory praise". The film received numerous accolades, with eight nominations at the 91st Academy Awards, winning Best Makeup and Hairstyling. It also received six nominations each from the Golden Globes and the BAFTAs. For their performances, Bale, Adams, and Rockwell were nominated for all three awards, with Bale winning the Golden Globe Award for Best Actor in a Motion Picture – Musical or Comedy.

== Plot ==
Vice is narrated by Kurt, a fictitious veteran of the Afghan and Iraq wars.

In 1963, Dick Cheney works as a lineman in Wyoming after dropping out of Yale University. After Cheney is caught driving while intoxicated, his wife Lynne threatens to leave him if he does not become sober.

In 1969, Cheney becomes a White House intern during Richard Nixon's presidency. Under Nixon's economic adviser, Donald Rumsfeld, Cheney becomes a savvy political operative while juggling commitments to his wife and their daughters, Liz and Mary. Cheney overhears Henry Kissinger discussing the secret bombing of Cambodia with Nixon, exposing the executive branch's true power to Cheney. Rumsfeld's abrasive attitude leads to him and Cheney being distanced from Nixon, which works in both men's favor; after Nixon's resignation in 1974, Cheney rises to the position of White House Chief of Staff for President Gerald Ford, while Rumsfeld becomes Secretary of Defense. The media dubs the sudden shake-up in the cabinet as the Halloween Massacre. During his tenure, a young Antonin Scalia introduces Cheney to the unitary executive theory.

After Ford loses the 1976 election to Jimmy Carter, Cheney runs for Congress in Wyoming. After an awkward and uncharismatic campaign speech, Cheney suffers a heart attack. While he recovers, Lynne campaigns on his behalf, earning him a seat in the House of Representatives. During the Reagan administration, Cheney supports many conservative, pro-business policies favoring the fossil fuel industries, as well as the abolition of the FCC fairness doctrine, which contributed to the rise of Fox News, conservative talk radio, and the rising party polarization in the United States. Cheney then serves as Secretary of Defense under President George H. W. Bush during the Gulf War. Outside of politics, Cheney and Lynne come to terms with their younger daughter, Mary, coming out as a lesbian. Though Cheney develops ambitions to run for president, he decides to retire due to lack of presidential polling enthusiasm for him and to spare Mary from media scrutiny.

Cheney becomes the CEO of Halliburton while his wife breeds Golden Retrievers and writes books. A false epilogue claims that Cheney lived the rest of his life healthy and happy in the private sector, and credits begin rolling, only to end abruptly before the film continues.

George W. Bush invites Cheney to become his running mate in the 2000 United States presidential election. Assuming Bush is more interested in impressing his father than attaining power for himself, Cheney agrees on the condition that Bush delegates executive responsibilities to him and does not force him to take a stance against gay rights. As vice president, Cheney works with Rumsfeld, legal counsel David Addington, Mary Matalin, and Chief of Staff Scooter Libby to exercise control of key foreign policy and defense decisions.

In the aftermath of the September 11, 2001 terrorist attacks, Cheney and Rumsfeld maneuver to initiate and preside over the U.S. invasions of Afghanistan and Iraq. Various other events from his vice presidency are depicted, including his endorsement of the unitary executive theory, the Plame affair, and the accidental shooting of Harry Whittington. Cheney's actions lead to hundreds of thousands of deaths and the rise of the Islamic State of Iraq, and he receives record-low approval ratings by the end of the Bush administration.

While narrating Cheney's deathbed goodbye to his family after another heart attack, Kurt dies in a traffic accident. His heart is transplanted into Cheney. Liz publicly states her opposition to same-sex marriage while running for a Senate seat a few months later, and Cheney does not object. A distraught Mary distances herself from her family. Liz wins election to her father's former position in the House two years later. An irate Cheney breaks the fourth wall and delivers a monologue to the audience at the end of the film, declaring he has no regrets about anything he has done in his career.

In a mid-credits scene, some members of a focus group reviewing the film passionately debate the film's effectiveness and the Trump administration, while others are uninterested and would rather discuss the latest Fast & Furious movie.

== Cast ==
=== Main characters ===
- Christian Bale as Dick Cheney
  - Alex MacNicoll and Aidan Gail as young Dick Cheney
- Amy Adams as Lynne Cheney
  - Cailee Spaeny as young Lynne
- Steve Carell as Donald Rumsfeld
- Sam Rockwell as George W. Bush
- Tyler Perry as Colin Powell
- Alison Pill as Mary Cheney
  - Colyse Harger as young Mary Cheney
- Lily Rabe as Liz Cheney
  - Violet Hicks as young Liz Cheney
- Jesse Plemons as Kurt, the narrator

=== Supporting characters ===
- Justin Kirk as Scooter Libby
- LisaGay Hamilton as Condoleezza Rice
- Eddie Marsan as Paul Wolfowitz
- Bill Camp as Gerald Ford
- Don McManus as David Addington
- Shea Whigham as Wayne Vincent
- Stephen Adly Guirgis as George Tenet
- Josh Latzer as Secret Service Agent
- Vishesh Chachra as Secret Service Agent Robert
- Jeff Bosley as Secret Service Agent
- Camille Harman as Mary Matalin
- Jillian Armenante as Karen Hughes
- Matthew Jacobs as Antonin Scalia
  - Sam Massaro as young Scalia
- Robert Hughes as Warren E. Burger
- Paul Perri as Trent Lott
- Brandon Sklenar as Bobby Prentace
- Fay Masterson as Edna Vincent
- Kyle More as Roger Ailes
- Kirk Bovill as Henry Kissinger
- Melissa K. Marks as Heather Poe
- Chris Dougherty as Philip Perry
- John Hillner as George H. W. Bush
- Michael Reilly Burke as David Gribbin
- William Goldman as Dennis Hastert
- Tony Forsmark as Grover Norquist
- Adam Bartley as Frank Luntz
- Kevin J. Flood as Richard A. Clarke
- Paul Yoo as John Yoo
- Brandon Firla as Jay Bybee
- Matt Champagne as Douglas J. Feith
- Joseph Beck as Karl Rove
- Tony Graham as Abu Musab al-Zarqawi
- Alex Kingi as Osama bin Laden
- David Fabrizio as Lawrence Wilkerson
- Mark Bramhall as Harry Whittington
- James Hornbeck as Patrick Leahy
- Bob Stephenson as Rush Limbaugh
- Alfred Molina as Waiter (uncredited)
- Naomi Watts as News Anchor (uncredited)

== Production ==
On November 22, 2016, it was announced that Paramount Pictures had come on board to handle the rights to a drama about Dick Cheney; the screenplay was to be written by Adam McKay, who would also direct. The film was produced by Plan B producers Brad Pitt, Dede Gardner and Jeremy Kleiner, along with McKay and his Gary Sanchez partners Will Ferrell and Kevin Messick. Bale signed on to play Cheney in April 2017, and gained 40 pounds (18 kg) for the role.

On August 22, Bill Pullman was cast as Nelson Rockefeller (though he did not appear in the finished film), and a title, Backseat, was announced. It was later changed to Vice. On August 31, Sam Rockwell was cast as George W. Bush. In September 2017, Adam Bartley joined the cast.

Principal production commenced in late September 2017. Tyler Perry and Lily Rabe joined the film in October as Colin Powell and Liz Cheney, respectively.

== Release and reception ==
The film premiered at the Samuel Goldwyn Theater in Beverly Hills, California, on December 11, 2018.

Vice was released in both Canada and the United States on December 25, 2018 alongside Holmes & Watson. It was previously scheduled for release on December 14, 2018. The film opened in the United Kingdom on January 25, 2019, with most of Europe and Hong Kong following with February 2019 release dates.

Vice was released on Blu-ray Disc and DVD by 20th Century Fox Home Entertainment on April 2, 2019.

=== Box office ===
Vice grossed $47.8 million in the United States and Canada, and $28.2 million in other territories, for a total worldwide gross of $76.1 million, against a production budget of $60 million. In May 2024, Variety reported that the film had never turned a profit.

In the United States and Canada, the film was released alongside Holmes & Watson on Christmas Day and was projected to gross around $13 million from 2,378 theaters over its first six days. It made $4.8 million on its first day and $2.9 million on its second. The film went on to have a first weekend gross of $7.8 million, for a six-day total of $17.7 million. According to The Hollywood Reporter, the film performed its "best on both coasts, versus America's heartland, although some theaters in markets including Dallas, Houston and Phoenix turned in respectable business". It then made $5.8 million in its second weekend and $3.3 million in its third.

=== Critical response ===
On review aggregator Rotten Tomatoes, Vice has an approval rating of 64% based on 366 reviews, with an average rating of 6.7/10. The website's critical consensus reads: "Vice takes scattershot aim at its targets, but writer-director Adam McKay hits some satisfying bullseyes—and Christian Bale's transformation is a sight to behold." On Metacritic, the film has a weighted average score 61 out of 100, based on 54 critics, indicating "generally favorable reviews". Audiences polled by CinemaScore gave the film an average grade of "C+" on an A+ to F scale, while those at PostTrak gave it an overall positive score of 72% and a 49% "definite recommend". The critical response to Vice made it one of the worst-reviewed films to ever be nominated for Best Picture at the Academy Awards.

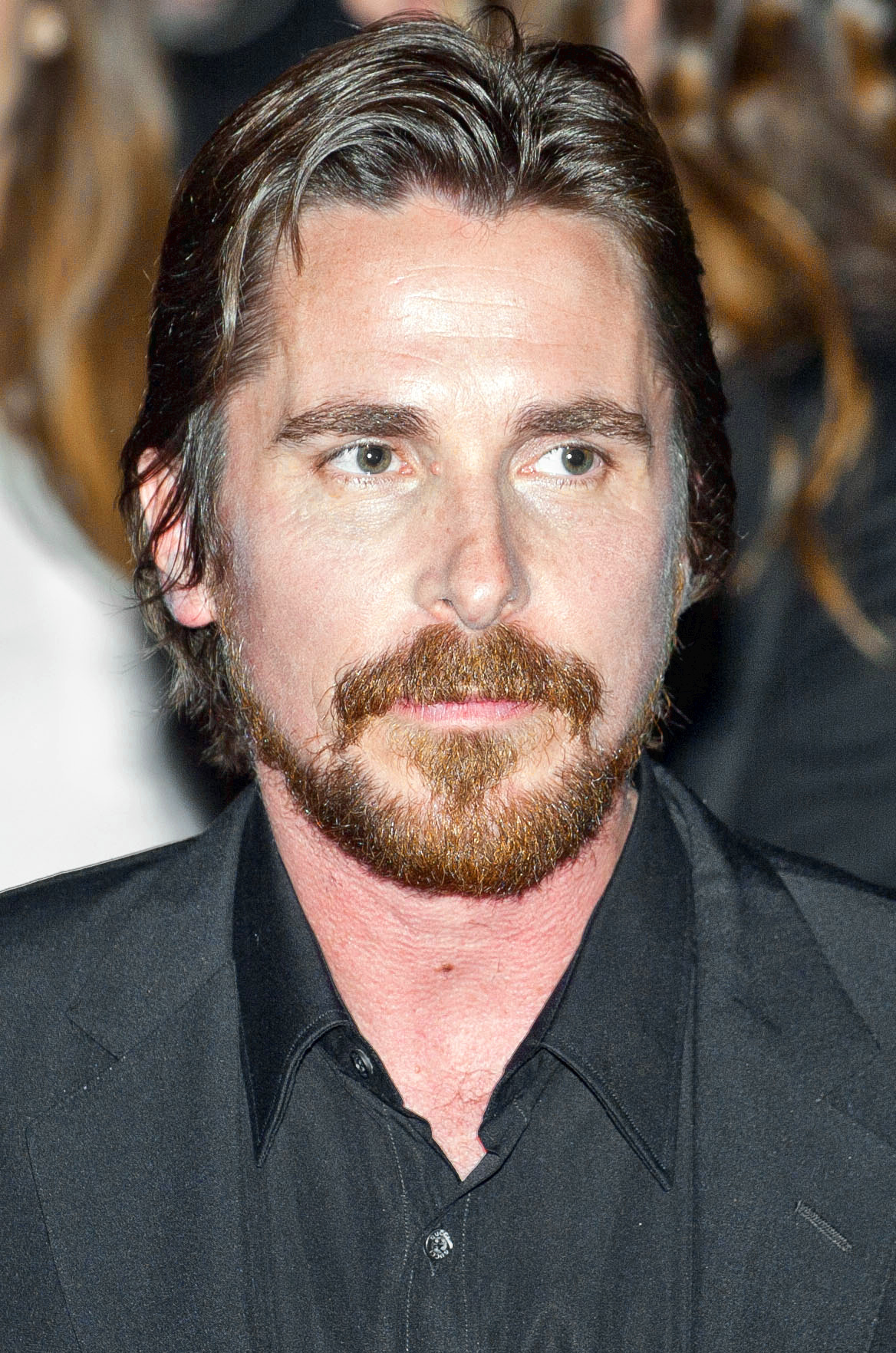
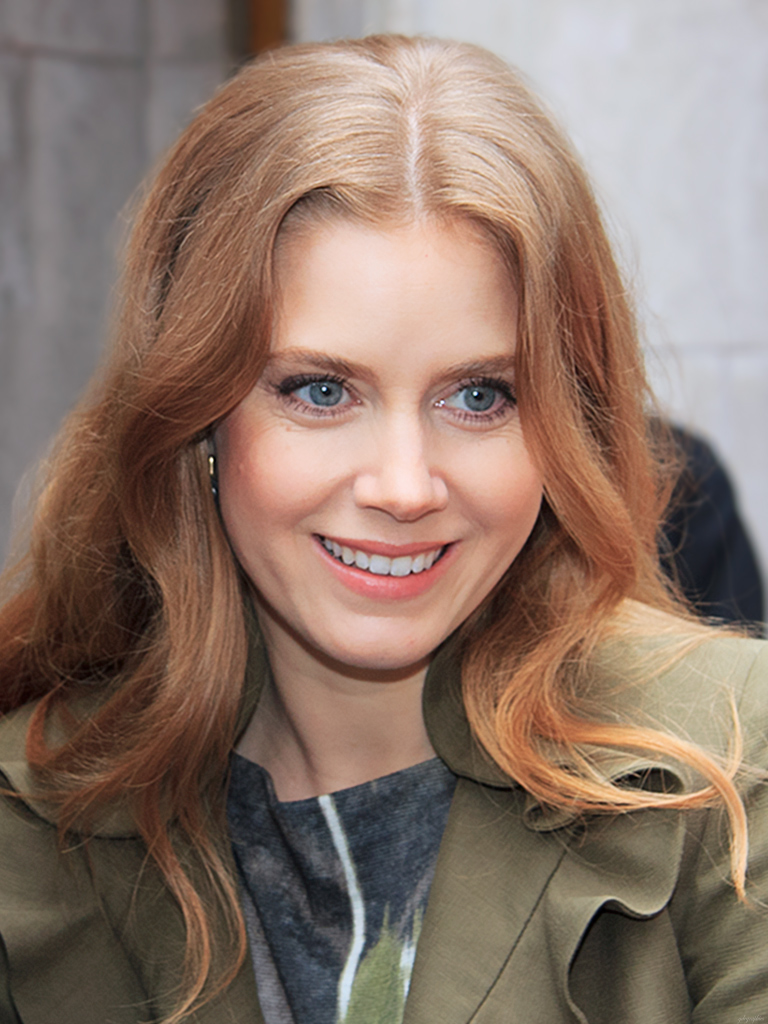
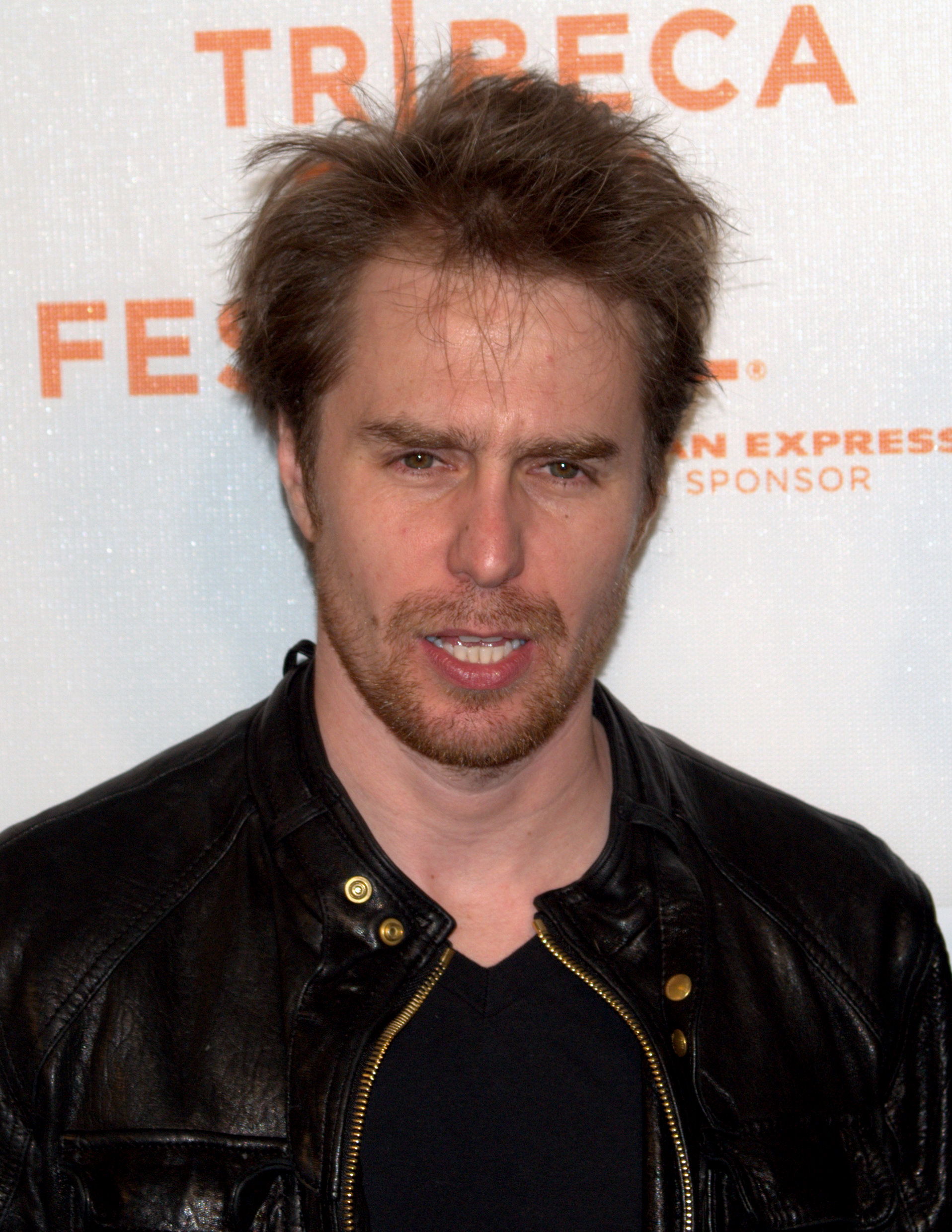
The performances of Christian Bale, Amy Adams and Sam Rockwell received critical acclaim, earning them Academy Award nominations for Best Actor, Best Supporting Actress and Best Supporting Actor respectively.

Todd McCarthy of The Hollywood Reporter, who named the film his favorite of 2018, wrote: "Across the board in Vice, everyone has risen to the occasion of their individual challenges, none of them easy, to collectively pull off a political satire that both provokes great laughs and hits home with some tragic truths". Eric Kohn of IndieWire gave the film a "B−" and called it "messy but ambitious", writing: "Vice, in its rambunctious and unfocused manner, takes some ludicrous risks to make cogent points about Cheney's malicious intent—and how he put his plans into action". By contrast, Peter Bradshaw of The Guardian awarded the film 4/5 stars, and wrote that Bale "captur[es] the former vice-president's bland magnificence in Adam McKay's entertainingly nihilist biopic".

Rolling Stone film critic Peter Travers praised the film, giving it a 4/5 rating and writing: "Adam McKay's flamethrowing take on Dick Cheney, played by a shockingly brilliant Christian Bale, polarizes by being ferociously funny one minute, bleakly sorrowful the next, and ready to indict the past in the name of our scarily uncertain future."

Stephanie Zacharek of Time gave the film a negative review, describing Vice as an "exhausting film that turns Dick Cheney into a cartoon villain". Ikon London Magazine, while praising the make-up artistry of Greg Cannom, noted that "the story reminds of a witch hunt".

Ann Hornaday of The Washington Post praised Bale's performance as Cheney but criticized the story pacing, awarding the film 2/5 stars. Hornaday had issues with the film's structure, writing that the film is "a mess, zigging here and zagging there, never knowing quite when to end, and when it finally does, leaving few penetrating or genuinely illuminating ideas to ponder". Similarly, Scott Mendelson of Forbes praised Bale's and Amy Adams's performances, but criticized the film as a "cinematic mediocrity".

=== Historical inaccuracies ===
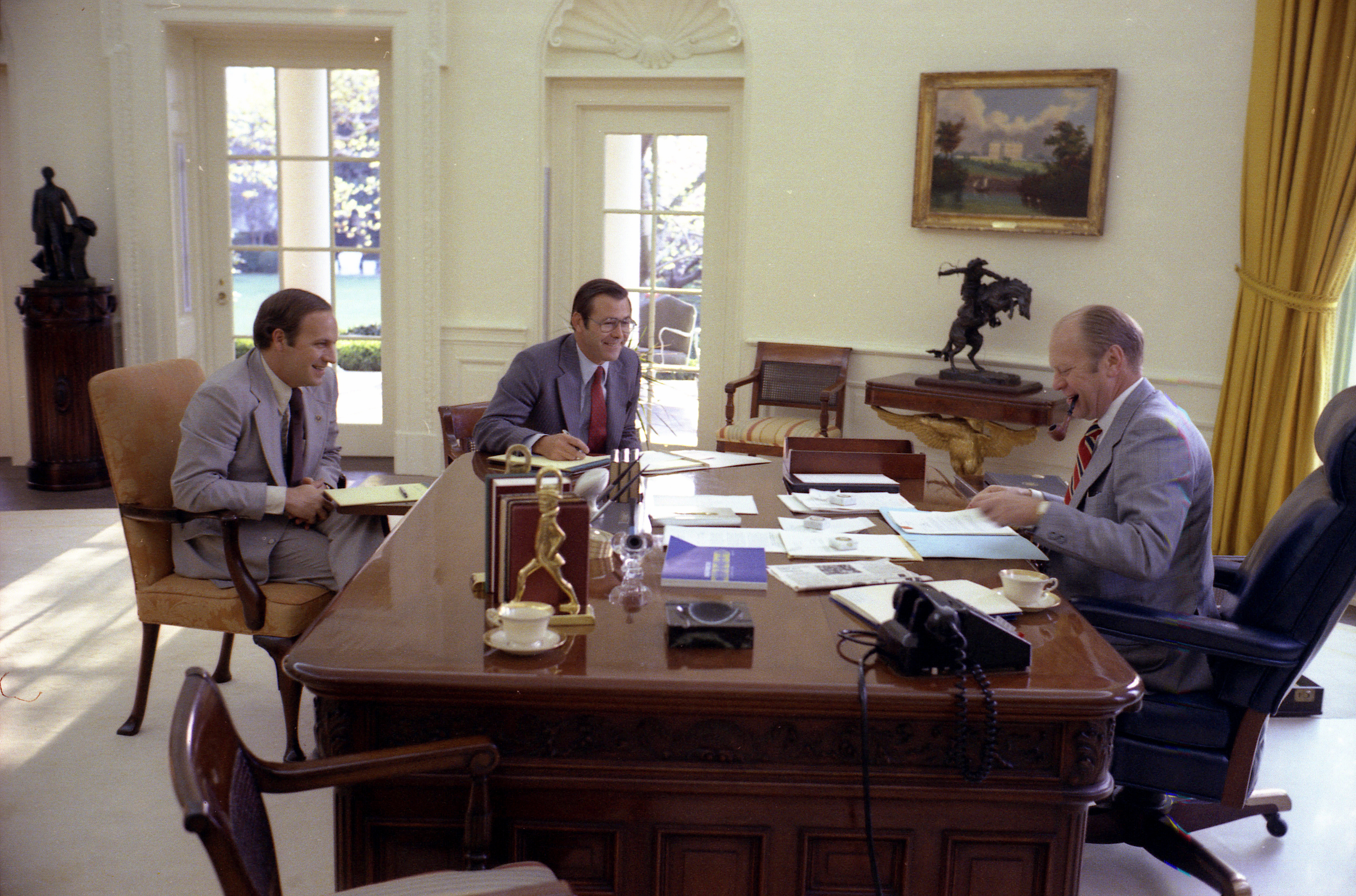
Real-life photograph of Dick Cheney and Donald Rumsfeld with President Gerald Ford at the Oval Office in 1975.

Numerous scenes from the film were identified as being historically inaccurate, heavily dramatized, or presented without necessary context. Politifact stated that in certain scenes, "the line between historic facts and poetic interpretation gets fuzzy".

During the early scene when Cheney first arrives for his congressional internship program in 1969, it is depicted that Cheney still has not yet decided whom he will work for and decides to work with Illinois's 13th district Congressman, Donald Rumsfeld following Cheney listening to and admiring Rumsfeld's speech. In real-life, Dick Cheney, who had been affiliated with the Republican Party and conservatism prior to his government service work, was actually introduced to Donald Rumsfeld by Rumsfeld's colleague in the House of Representatives, Congressman William A. Steiger from the 6th district of Wisconsin, to work under Rumsfeld when he was appointed by President Richard Nixon as Director of the Office of Economic Opportunity and needed more staff to work with. During Rumsfeld's tenure as Director of the Office of Economic Opportunity, Rumsfeld also brings along his old protégé from Rumsfeld's time at Princeton University, Frank Carlucci to work along with Dick Cheney to assist Rumsfeld with tasks as Director of the Office of Economic Opportunity. Carlucci later succeeded Rumsfeld as Director of the Office of Economic Opportunity when Rumsfeld was appointed as Counselor to the President by President Nixon. Rumsfeld, Cheney and Carlucci would all later serve as United States Secretary of Defense.

An important scene in the film that depicts Dick Cheney conversing with Antonin Scalia in the mid-1970s about expanding the power of the executive branch is entirely fictional. However, Cheney campaigned for increased presidential authority. In the scene, the "theory of the unitary executive" is mentioned although the phrase did not become used by legal scholars until the late 1980s. Politifact says that the film also "butchers" the meaning of the unitary executive when in reality, the theory says the president has ultimate control over the executive branch, based on an interpretation of the Vesting Clauses. However, the film represents the theory as advocating for the president to have unlimited powers.

McKay was criticized for going soft on Democrats for their role in the Iraq War in the film, which he later said was a mistake. "I regret not giving more blame to the Democrats, who went along with the war in Iraq...I made mistakes, read the reviews and went, 'Yes, fair,'" he told Variety in March 2022.

=== Responses from Cheney family ===
Dick Cheney's daughter and Congresswoman Liz Cheney criticized Christian Bale for his portrayal of her father in Vice, remarking during a Fox & Friends interview that "he finally had the chance to play a real superhero, and he clearly screwed it up". Liz also responded negatively to Bale's acceptance speech for winning the Best Actor in a Comedy or Musical Golden Globe for his portrayal of Cheney, in which the actor thanked Satan for inspiring him to play the role of Cheney.

=== Accolades ===
Vice has received multiple awards and nominations, and was nominated for six Golden Globe Awards at the 76th annual ceremony, the most nominations of any film, with Bale winning for Golden Globe Award for Best Actor in a Motion Picture – Musical or Comedy. The film was subsequently nominated for eight awards at the 91st Academy Awards (winning Best Make-Up and Hairstyling), nine awards at the 24th Critics' Choice Awards (winning Best Actor and Best Actor in a Comedy for Bale), six awards at the 72nd British Academy Film Awards (winning Best Editing), and 4 nominations at the 8th AACTA International Awards.
