= List of accolades received by Green Book =

Green Book accolades
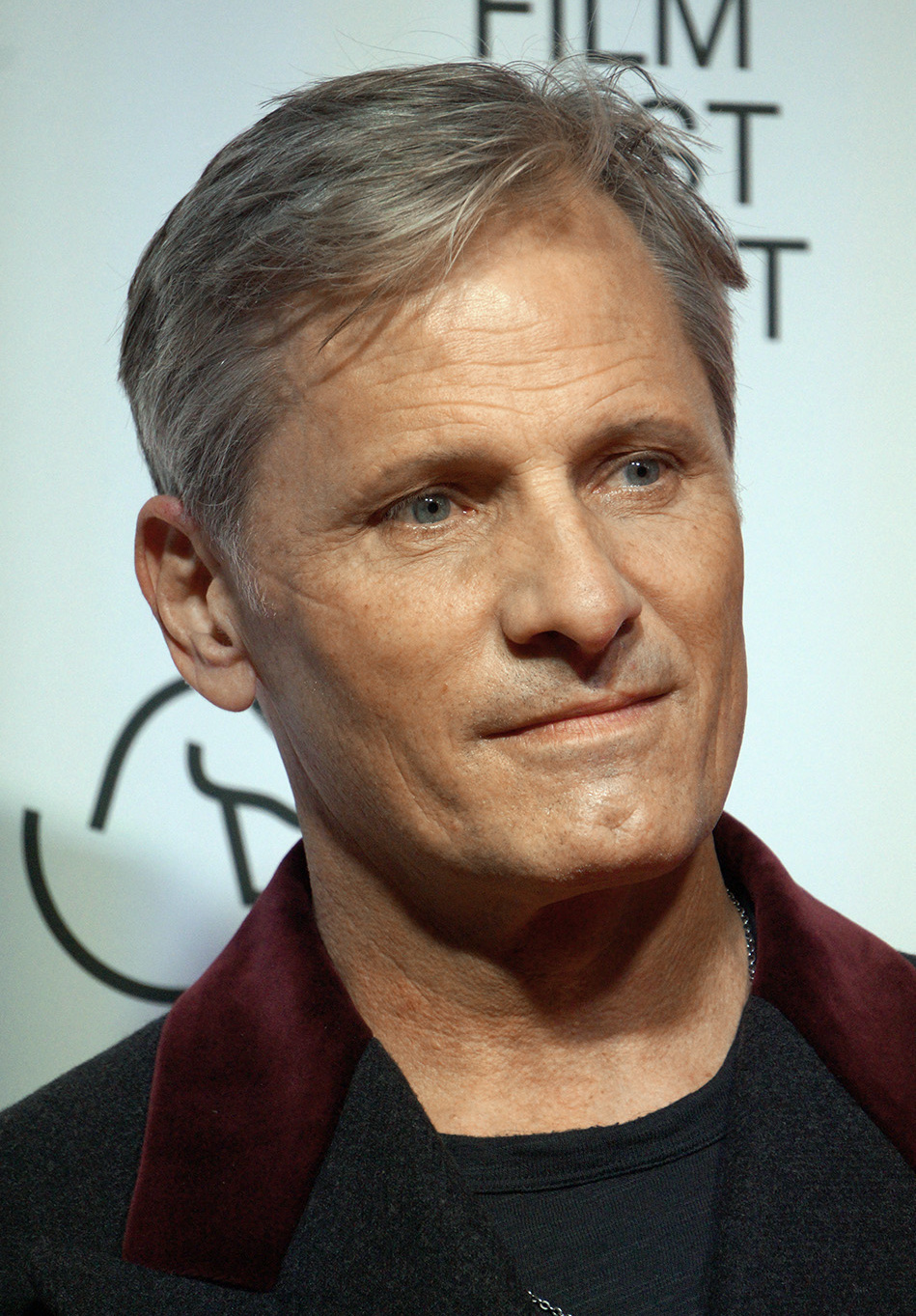
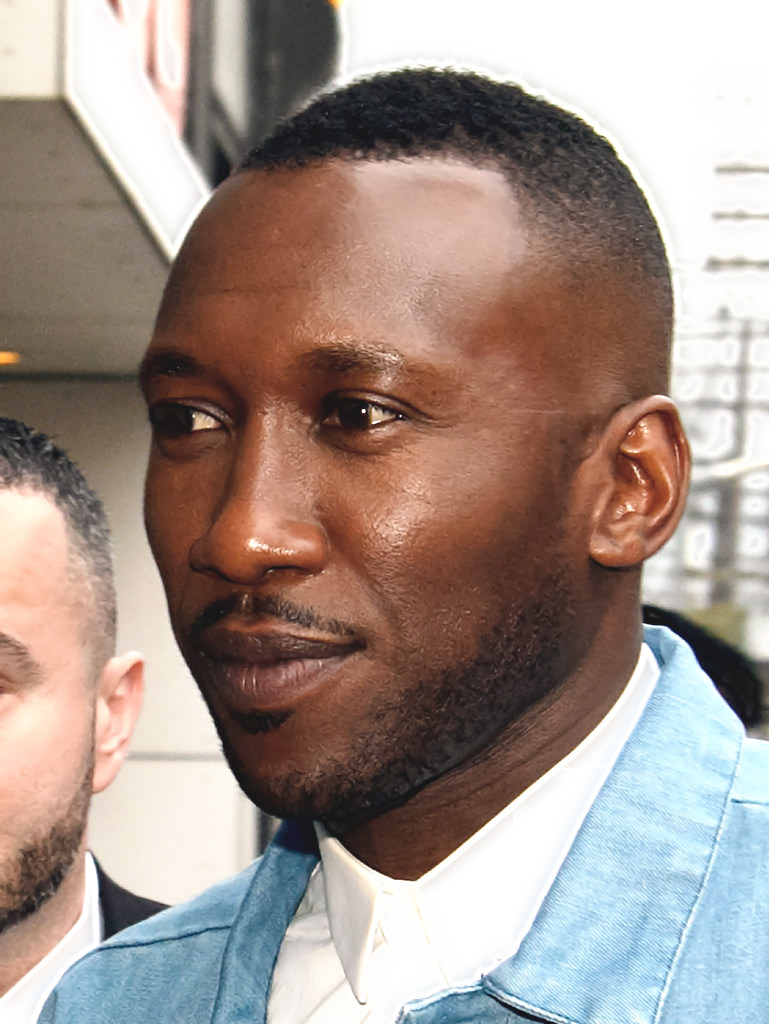
- Viggo Mortensen (left) and Mahershala Ali (right) won several accolades for their performances as Frank "Tony Lip" Vallelonga and Don Shirley respectively.
Accolades
Award	Wins	Nominations
AACTA International Awards	1	2
AARP Movies for Grownups Awards	2	4
Academy Awards	3	5
Alliance of Women Film Journalists EDA Awards	0	3
Amanda Awards	0	1
American Cinema Editors Eddie Awards	0	1
American Film Institute Awards	1	1
Artios Awards	1	1
Austin Film Festival Awards	1	1
BET Awards	0	1
Black Reel Awards	0	3
Blue Ribbon Awards	0	1
Boston Film Festival Awards	2	2
British Academy Film Awards	1	4
Capri Hollywood International Film Festival Awards	1	1
Chicago Film Critics Association Awards	0	1
Cinema for Peace Awards	0	1
Critics' Choice Movie Awards	1	7
Dallas–Fort Worth Film Critics Association	3	3
David di Donatello Awards	0	1
Denver Film Festival Awards	1	1
Detroit Film Critics Society Awards	1	4
Directors Guild of America Awards	0	1
Dorian Awards	0	1
Florida Film Critics Circle Awards	0	3
Georgia Film Critics Association Awards	0	1
Golden Eagle Awards	0	1
Golden Globe Awards	3	5
Golden Raspberry Awards	0	1
Golden Reel Awards	0	1
Golden Trailer Awards	0	2
Guild of Music Supervisors Awards	1	1
Heartland International Film Festival Awards	1	1
Hollywood Film Awards	2	2
Hollywood Music in Media Awards	0	1
Hollywood Professional Association Awards	0	2
Houston Film Critics Society Awards	1	3
IndieWire Critics Poll	1	1
Japan Academy Film Prize	0	1
Jupiter Awards	0	1
Kinema Junpo Awards	1	1
Mainichi Film Awards	0	1
Middleburg Film Festival Awards	1	1
Mill Valley Film Festival Awards	1	1
NAACP Image Awards	1	1
National Board of Review Awards	2	2
New Orleans Film Festival Awards	1	1
New York Film Critics Online Awards	1	1
Nikkan Sports Film Awards	1	1
Online Film Critics Society Awards	0	1
Palm Springs International Film Festival Awards	1	1
Philadelphia Film Festival Awards	1	1
Producers Guild of America Awards	1	1
Robert Awards	0	1
San Diego Film Critics Society Awards	4	9
San Francisco Film Critics Circle Awards	0	2
Santa Barbara International Film Festival Awards	1	1
Satellite Awards	0	5
Screen Actors Guild Awards	1	2
Seattle Film Critics Society Awards	0	1
St. Louis Film Critics Association Awards	0	2
St. Louis International Film Festival Awards	1	1
Toronto Film Critics Association Awards	1	1
Toronto International Film Festival Awards	1	1
Vancouver Film Critics Circle Awards	0	2
Virginia Film Festival Awards	1	1
Washington D.C. Area Film Critics Association Awards	1	4
Women Film Critics Circle Awards	0	1
World Soundtrack Awards	0	1
Writers Guild of America Awards	0	1

Totals (Note: Certain award groups do not simply award one winner. They acknowledge several different recipients, have runners-up, and have third place. Since this is a specific recognition and is different from losing an award, runner-up mentions are considered wins in this award tally. For simplification and to avoid errors, each award in this list has been presumed to have had a prior nomination.)
- Wins: 51
- Nominations: 128

Green Book is a 2018 American biographical comedy-drama film directed by Peter Farrelly. The film is set in 1962 and follows Italian–American bouncer Frank "Tony Lip" Vallelonga (Viggo Mortensen), who is hired as a chauffeur by African American pianist Don Shirley (Mahershala Ali) for a tour of concert venues in the Deep South. Written by Farrelly alongside Lip's son Nick Vallelonga and Brian Hayes Currie, the film is based on interviews with Lip and Shirley, as well as letters Lip wrote to his wife. It is named after The Negro Motorist Green Book, a guide book for African American travelers created by Victor Hugo Green in 1936 and published until 1967.

Green Book premiered at the Toronto International Film Festival on September 11, 2018, where it won the Grolsch People's Choice Award. The film was given a limited release in 20 cities in the United States on November 16, 2018, before being expanded nationwide on November 21, 2018. Releases in other territories followed through to March 2019. Produced on a budget of $23 million, the film grossed $321 million worldwide. Green Book received generally positive reviews from critics, who especially praised Ali and Mortensen's performances and chemistry. (Note: Attributed to multiple references:) However, some also criticized the film's portrayal of race, variously calling it clichèd, naive and tone deaf, a "racial reconciliation fantasy", and as perpetuating a white savior narrative. Shirley's brother also argued that the film misrepresented the pianist and his relationship with both his family and Lip. Both Farrelly and Mortensen pushed back against these criticisms. On the review aggregator website Rotten Tomatoes, the film holds an approval rating of 77% based on 362 reviews.

Green Book garnered awards and nominations from a variety of categories, with particular recognition for its direction, screenplay and performances. At the 91st Academy Awards, the film received five nominations, winning Best Picture, (Note: The win proved controversial due to the criticisms the film received. At the ceremony, director Spike Lee—whose film BlacKkKlansman was also nominated for Best Picture—was visibly upset when Green Book's name was called and later said “I thought I was courtside at the Garden and the ref made a bad call.”) Best Original Screenplay, and Best Supporting Actor. The film was also nominated in five categories at the 76th Golden Globe Awards, where it won Best Motion Picture – Musical or Comedy, Best Supporting Actor – Motion Picture, and Golden Globe Award for Best Screenplay. Ali was further recognized with the Critics' Choice Movie Award for Best Supporting Actor at the 24th Critics' Choice Awards (where the film earned seven nominations) and the BAFTA Award for Best Actor in a Supporting Role at the 72nd British Academy Film Awards (where the film garnered nominations in four categories). In addition, Green Book was chosen as Best Film at the 90th National Board of Review Awards, and was named one of the Top 10 Films of 2018 by the American Film Institute.

== Accolades ==
List of accolades received by Green Book
Award	Date of ceremony	Category	Recipient(s)	Result	Ref(s).
AACTA International Awards	January 4, 2019	Best Actor	Viggo Mortensen	Nominated	
AACTA International Awards	January 4, 2019	Best Supporting Actor	Mahershala Ali	Won	
AARP Movies for Grownups Awards	February 4, 2019	Best Movie for Grownups	Green Book	Won	
AARP Movies for Grownups Awards	February 4, 2019	Best Director	Peter Farrelly	Nominated	
AARP Movies for Grownups Awards	February 4, 2019	Best Actor	Viggo Mortensen	Won	
AARP Movies for Grownups Awards	February 4, 2019	Best Screenwriter	Nick Vallelonga, Brian Hayes Currie, and Peter Farrelly	Nominated	
Academy Awards	February 24, 2019	Best Picture	Jim Burke, Charles B. Wessler, Brian Hayes Currie, Peter Farrelly, and Nick Vallelonga	Won	
Academy Awards	February 24, 2019	Best Actor	Viggo Mortensen	Nominated	
Academy Awards	February 24, 2019	Best Supporting Actor	Mahershala Ali	Won	
Academy Awards	February 24, 2019	Best Original Screenplay	Nick Vallelonga, Brian Hayes Currie, and Peter Farrelly	Won	
Academy Awards	February 24, 2019	Best Film Editing	Patrick J. Don Vito	Nominated	
Alliance of Women Film Journalists EDA Awards	January 10, 2019	Best Film	Green Book	Nominated	
Alliance of Women Film Journalists EDA Awards	January 10, 2019	Best Actor	Viggo Mortensen	Nominated	
Alliance of Women Film Journalists EDA Awards	January 10, 2019	Best Supporting Actor	Mahershala Ali	Nominated	
Amanda Awards	August 17, 2019	Best International Film (English Language)	Green Book	Nominated	
American Cinema Editors Eddie Awards	February 1, 2019	Best Edited Feature Film – Comedy	Patrick J. Don Vito	Nominated	
American Film Institute Awards	January 4, 2019	Top 10 Films of the Year	Green Book	Won (Note: This award does not have a single winner, but recognizes multiple films.)	
Artios Awards	January 31, 2019	Outstanding Achievement in Casting – Big Budget Feature (Comedy)	Rick Montgomery, Meagan Lewis and Thomas Sullivan	Won	
Austin Film Festival Awards	November 8, 2018	Hiscox Insurance Audience Award – Marquee Feature	Green Book	Won	
BET Awards	June 23, 2019	Best Actor	Mahershala Ali	Nominated	
Black Reel Awards	February 7, 2019	Outstanding Film	Green Book	Nominated	
Black Reel Awards	February 7, 2019	Supporting Actor	Mahershala Ali	Nominated	
Black Reel Awards	February 7, 2019	Outstanding Production Design	Tim Galvin	Nominated	
Blue Ribbon Awards	February 18, 2020	Best Foreign Film	Green Book	Nominated	
Boston Film Festival Awards	September 23, 2018	Best Film	Green Book	Won	
Boston Film Festival Awards	September 23, 2018	Best Actor	Viggo Mortensen	Won	
British Academy Film Awards	February 10, 2019	Best Film	Jim Burke, Charles B. Wessler, Brian Hayes Currie, Peter Farrelly, and Nick Vallelonga	Nominated	
British Academy Film Awards	February 10, 2019	Best Actor in a Leading Role	Viggo Mortensen	Nominated	
British Academy Film Awards	February 10, 2019	Best Actor in a Supporting Role	Mahershala Ali	Won	
British Academy Film Awards	February 10, 2019	Best Original Screenplay	Nick Vallelonga, Brian Hayes Currie, and Peter Farrelly	Nominated	
Capri Hollywood International Film Festival Awards	January 2, 2019	Best Original Screenplay	Brian Hayes Currie, Peter Farrelly, and Nick Vallelonga	Won	
Chicago Film Critics Association Awards	December 8, 2018	Best Supporting Actor	Mahershala Ali	Nominated	
Cinema for Peace Awards	February 23, 2019	Cinema for Peace Award for The Most Valuable Film of the Year	Green Book	Nominated	
Critics' Choice Movie Awards	January 13, 2019	Best Picture	Green Book	Nominated	
Critics' Choice Movie Awards	January 13, 2019	Best Director	Peter Farrelly	Nominated	
Critics' Choice Movie Awards	January 13, 2019	Best Actor	Viggo Mortensen	Nominated	
Critics' Choice Movie Awards	January 13, 2019	Best Supporting Actor	Mahershala Ali	Won	
Critics' Choice Movie Awards	January 13, 2019	Best Original Screenplay	Nick Vallelonga, Brian Hayes Currie, and Peter Farrelly	Nominated	
Critics' Choice Movie Awards	January 13, 2019	Best Actor in a Comedy	Viggo Mortensen	Nominated	
Critics' Choice Movie Awards	January 13, 2019	Best Score	Kris Bowers	Nominated	
Dallas–Fort Worth Film Critics Association	December 17, 2018	Best Supporting Actor	Mahershala Ali	Won	
Dallas–Fort Worth Film Critics Association	December 17, 2018	Best Film	Green Book	7th Place	
Dallas–Fort Worth Film Critics Association	December 17, 2018	Best Actor	Viggo Mortensen	5th Place	
David di Donatello Awards	May 8, 2020	Best Foreign Film	Green Book	Nominated	
Denver Film Festival Awards	November 13, 2018	People's Choice Award – Best Narrative Feature	Green Book	Won	
Detroit Film Critics Society Awards	December 3, 2018	Best Film	Green Book	Nominated	
Detroit Film Critics Society Awards	December 3, 2018	Best Supporting Actor	Mahershala Ali	Nominated	
Detroit Film Critics Society Awards	December 3, 2018	Best Screenplay	Nick Vallelonga, Brian Hayes Currie, and Peter Farrelly	Won (Note: Tied with Vice (2018))	
Detroit Film Critics Society Awards	December 3, 2018	Best Use of Music	Green Book	Nominated	
Directors Guild of America Awards	February 2, 2019	Outstanding Directing – Feature Film	Peter Farrelly	Nominated	
Dorian Awards	January 12, 2019	Film Performance of the Year – Supporting Actor	Mahershala Ali	Nominated	
Florida Film Critics Circle Awards	December 21, 2018	Best Actor	Viggo Mortensen	Nominated	
Florida Film Critics Circle Awards	December 21, 2018	Best Supporting Actor	Mahershala Ali	Nominated	
Florida Film Critics Circle Awards	December 21, 2018	Best Director	Peter Farrelly	Nominated	
Georgia Film Critics Association Awards	January 12, 2019	Best Supporting Actor	Mahershala Ali	Nominated	
Golden Eagle Awards	January 24, 2020	Best Foreign Language Film	Green Book	Nominated	
Golden Globe Awards	January 6, 2019	Best Motion Picture – Musical or Comedy	Green Book	Won	
Golden Globe Awards	January 6, 2019	Best Director	Peter Farrelly	Nominated	
Golden Globe Awards	January 6, 2019	Best Actor – Musical or Comedy	Viggo Mortensen	Nominated	
Golden Globe Awards	January 6, 2019	Best Supporting Actor	Mahershala Ali	Won	
Golden Globe Awards	January 6, 2019	Best Screenplay	Nick Vallelonga, Brian Hayes Currie, and Peter Farrelly	Won	
Golden Raspberry Awards	February 23, 2019	Razzie Redeemer Award	Peter Farrelly	Nominated	
Golden Reel Awards	February 17, 2019	Outstanding Achievement in Sound Editing – Dialogue and ADR for Feature Film	Green Book	Nominated	
Golden Trailer Awards	May 29, 2019	Best Drama	Universal Pictures and TRANSIT (for "Genius")	Nominated	
Golden Trailer Awards	May 29, 2019	Best Drama Poster	Universal Pictures and The Refinery	Nominated	
Guild of Music Supervisors Awards	February 13, 2019	Best Music Supervision for Films Budgeted Under $25 Million	Green Book	Won	
Heartland International Film Festival Awards	October 21, 2018	Truly Moving Picture Award	Green Book	Won	
Hollywood Film Awards	November 4, 2018	Hollywood Ensemble Award	Viggo Mortensen, Mahershala Ali, and Linda Cardellini	Won	
Hollywood Film Awards	November 4, 2018	Hollywood Screenwriter Award	Nick Vallelonga, Brian Hayes Currie, and Peter Farrelly	Won	
Hollywood Music in Media Awards	November 14, 2018	Best Original Score in a Feature Film	Kris Bowers	Nominated	
Hollywood Professional Association Awards	November 22, 2019	Outstanding Color Grading – Feature Film	Walter Volpatto	Nominated	
Hollywood Professional Association Awards	November 22, 2019	Outstanding Editing – Theatrical Feature	Patrick J. Don Vito	Nominated	
Houston Film Critics Society Awards	January 3, 2019	Best Picture	Green Book	Nominated	
Houston Film Critics Society Awards	January 3, 2019	Best Actor	Viggo Mortensen	Nominated	
Houston Film Critics Society Awards	January 3, 2019	Best Supporting Actor	Mahershala Ali	Won	
IndieWire Critics Poll	December 16, 2019	Best Lead Actor	Viggo Mortensen	5th Place	
Japan Academy Film Prize	March 6, 2020	Outstanding Foreign Language Film	Green Book	Nominated	
Jupiter Awards	March 19, 2020	Best International Film	Green Book	Nominated	
Kinema Junpo Awards	February 19, 2020	Best Foreign Film	Green Book	5th Place	
Mainichi Film Awards	February 13, 2020	Foreign Film Best One Award	Green Book	Nominated	
Middleburg Film Festival Awards	October 21, 2018	Audience Award – Narrative Feature	Green Book	Won	
Mill Valley Film Festival Awards	October 15, 2018	Overall Favorite Audience	Green Book	Won	
NAACP Image Awards	March 30, 2019	Outstanding Supporting Actor in a Motion Picture	Mahershala Ali	Nominated	
National Board of Review Awards	November 27, 2018	Best Film	Green Book	Won	
National Board of Review Awards	November 27, 2018	Best Actor	Viggo Mortensen	Won	
New Orleans Film Festival Awards	October 25, 2018	Audience Award – Best Spotlight Film	Green Book	Won	
New York Film Critics Online Awards	December 9, 2018	Top 10 Films	Green Book	Won	
Nikkan Sports Film Awards	December 12, 2019	Best Foreign Film	Green Book	Won	
Online Film Critics Society Awards	January 2, 2019	Best Supporting Actor	Mahershala Ali	Nominated	
Palm Springs International Film Festival Awards	January 3, 2019	Vanguard Award	Peter Farrelly, Viggo Mortensen, and Mahershala Ali	Won	
Philadelphia Film Festival Awards	October 26, 2018	Audience Award	Green Book	Won (Note: Also given to Teddy Pendergrass: If You Don't Know Me)	
Producers Guild of America Awards	January 19, 2019	Best Theatrical Motion Picture	Green Book	Won	
Robert Awards	January 26, 2020	Best English Language Film	Green Book	Nominated	
San Diego Film Critics Society Awards	December 10, 2018	Best Film	Green Book	Runner-up	
San Diego Film Critics Society Awards	December 10, 2018	Best Director	Peter Farrelly	Runner-up	
San Diego Film Critics Society Awards	December 10, 2018	Best Actor	Viggo Mortensen	Runner-up	
San Diego Film Critics Society Awards	December 10, 2018	Best Supporting Actor	Mahershala Ali	Nominated	
San Diego Film Critics Society Awards	December 10, 2018	Best Original Screenplay	Nick Vallelonga, Brian Hayes Currie, and Peter Farrelly	Runner-up	
San Diego Film Critics Society Awards	December 10, 2018	Best Editing	Patrick J. Don Vito	Nominated	
San Diego Film Critics Society Awards	December 10, 2018	Best Production Design	Tim Galvin	Nominated	
San Diego Film Critics Society Awards	December 10, 2018	Best Use of Music in a Film	Green Book	Nominated	
San Diego Film Critics Society Awards	December 10, 2018	Best Ensemble	Green Book	Nominated	
San Francisco Film Critics Circle Awards	December 9, 2018	Best Actor	Viggo Mortensen	Nominated	
San Francisco Film Critics Circle Awards	December 9, 2018	Best Supporting Actor	Mahershala Ali	Nominated	
Santa Barbara International Film Festival Awards	February 5, 2019	American Riviera Award	Viggo Mortensen	Won	
Satellite Awards	February 17, 2019	Best Motion Picture, Comedy or Musical	Green Book	Nominated	
Satellite Awards	February 17, 2019	Best Director	Peter Farrelly	Nominated	
Satellite Awards	February 17, 2019	Best Actor in a Motion Picture, Musical or Comedy	Viggo Mortensen	Nominated	
Satellite Awards	February 17, 2019	Best Actor in a Supporting Role	Mahershala Ali	Nominated	
Satellite Awards	February 17, 2019	Best Original Screenplay	Nick Vallelonga, Brian Hayes Currie, and Peter Farrelly	Nominated	
Screen Actors Guild Awards	January 27, 2019	Outstanding Performance by a Male Actor in a Leading Role	Viggo Mortensen	Nominated	
Screen Actors Guild Awards	January 27, 2019	Outstanding Performance by a Male Actor in a Supporting Role	Mahershala Ali	Won	
Seattle Film Critics Society Awards	December 17, 2018	Best Supporting Actor	Mahershala Ali	Nominated	
St. Louis Film Critics Association Awards	December 16, 2018	Best Supporting Actor	Mahershala Ali	Nominated	
St. Louis Film Critics Association Awards	December 16, 2018	Best Cinematography	Sean Porter	Nominated	
St. Louis International Film Festival Awards	November 11, 2018	Best of Fest Audience Choice Award – Best Film	Green Book	Won	
Toronto Film Critics Association Awards	December 9, 2018	Best Actor	Viggo Mortensen	Runner-up	
Toronto International Film Festival Awards	September 16, 2018	Grolsch People's Choice Award	Green Book	Won	
Vancouver Film Critics Circle Awards	December 17, 2018	Best Actor	Viggo Mortensen	Nominated	
Vancouver Film Critics Circle Awards	December 17, 2018	Best Supporting Actor	Mahershala Ali	Nominated	
Virginia Film Festival Awards	November 8, 2018	Audience Award – Narrative Feature	Green Book	Won	
Washington D.C. Area Film Critics Association	December 3, 2018	Best Film	Green Book	Nominated	
Washington D.C. Area Film Critics Association	December 3, 2018	Best Actor	Viggo Mortensen	Nominated	
Washington D.C. Area Film Critics Association	December 3, 2018	Best Supporting Actor	Mahershala Ali	Won	
Washington D.C. Area Film Critics Association	December 3, 2018	Best Original Screenplay	Nick Vallelonga, Brian Hayes Currie, and Peter Farrelly	Nominated	
Women Film Critics Circle Awards	December 11, 2018	Best Actor	Viggo Mortensen	Runner-up	
World Soundtrack Awards	October 18, 2019	Discovery of the Year	Kris Bowers	Nominated	
Writers Guild of America Awards	February 17, 2019	Best Original Screenplay	Nick Vallelonga, Brian Hayes Currie, and Peter Farrelly	Nominated	
