= List of accolades received by First Reformed =

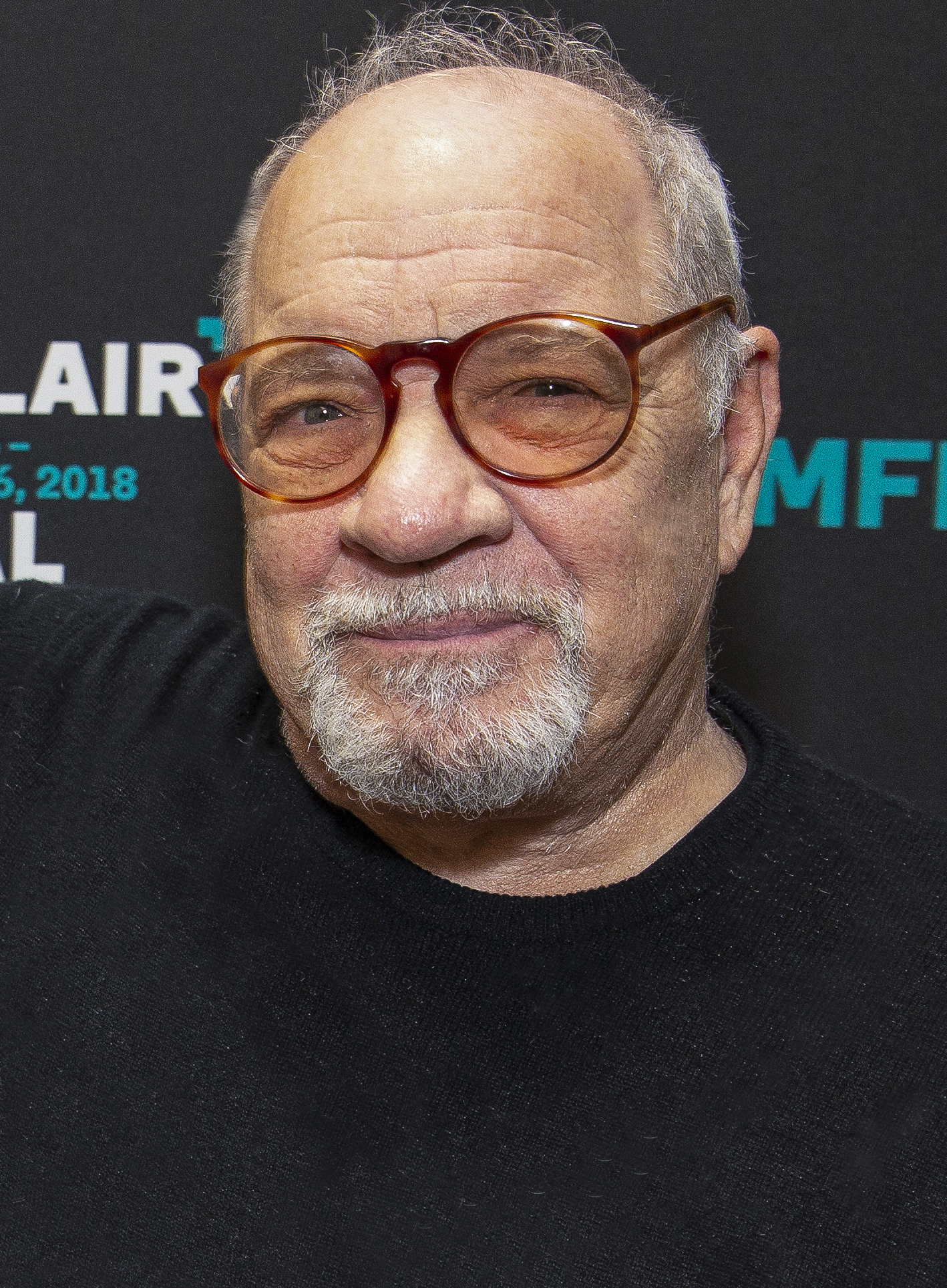
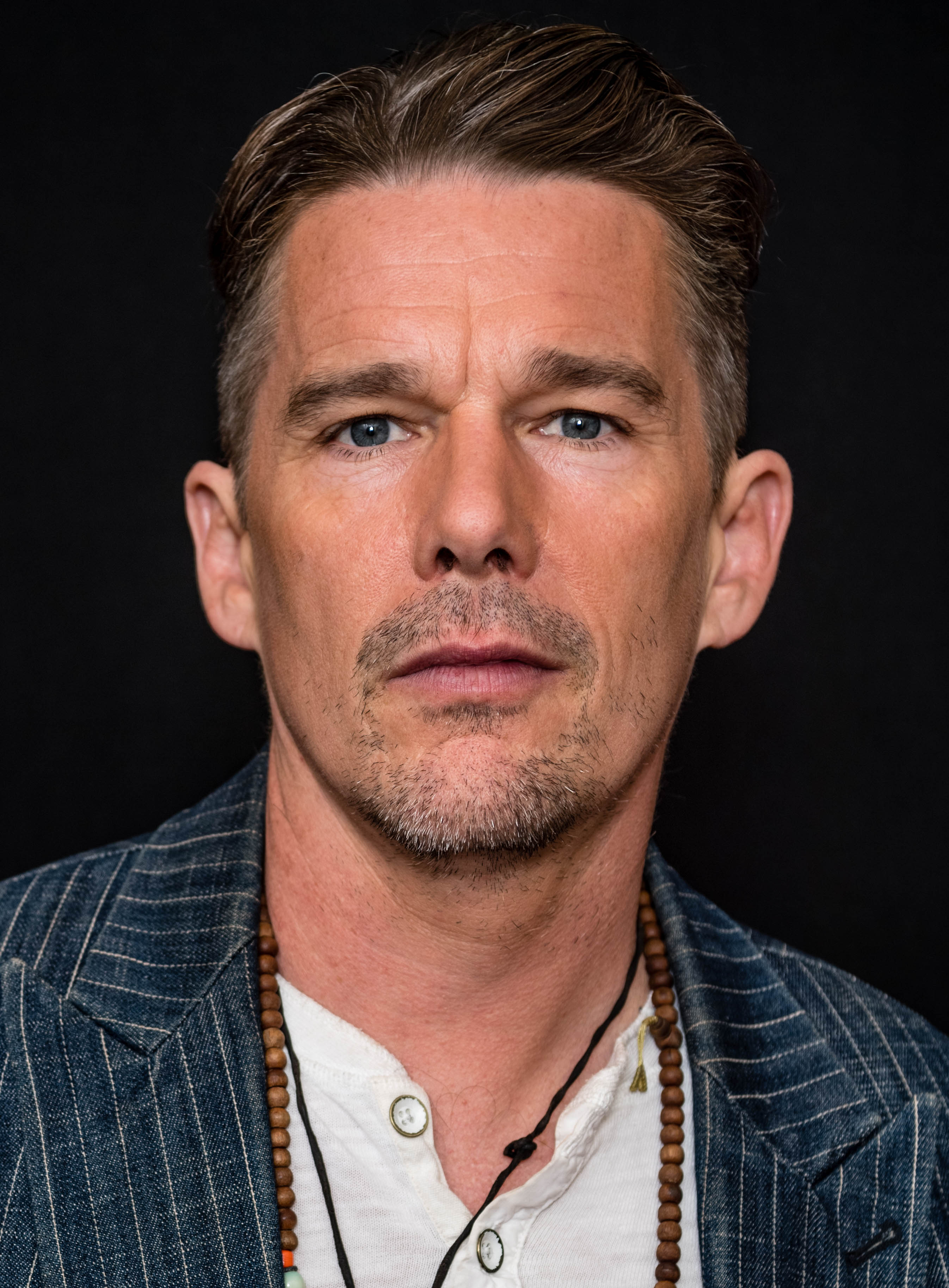
- Paul Schrader received critical acclaim for his screenplay and direction, and Ethan Hawke for his performance in the film.
Accolades
Award	Wins	Nominations
Academy Awards	0	1
Alliance of Women Film Journalists	1	2
American Film Institute Awards	1	1
Chicago Film Critics Association	2	4
Critics' Choice Movie Awards	1	2
Dallas–Fort Worth Film Critics Association	2	2
Detroit Film Critics Society	1	4
Dublin Film Critics' Circle	1	1
Gotham Awards	2	4
Houston Film Critics Society	0	3
Independent Spirit Awards	1	4
London Film Critics' Circle	1	3
Los Angeles Film Critics Association	1	1
Los Angeles Online Film Critics Society	0	2
National Board of Review Awards	2	2
New York Film Critics Circle	2	2
New York Film Critics Online	2	2
Online Film Critics Society	0	3
San Diego Film Critics Society	1	2
San Francisco Film Critics Circle	2	4
Satellite Awards	0	3
Seattle Film Critics Society	1	4
St. Louis Film Critics Association	1	3
Time Critics Choice	2	2
Toronto Film Critics Association	4	4
Vancouver Film Critics Circle	3	4
Washington D.C. Area Film Critics Association	0	2

Totals (Note: Certain award groups do not simply award one winner. They acknowledge several different recipients, have runners-up, and have third place. Since this is a specific recognition and is different from losing an award, runner-up mentions are considered wins in this award tally. For simplification and to avoid errors, each award in this list has been presumed to have had a prior nomination.)
- Wins: 37
- Nominations: 71

First Reformed is a 2017 American drama film written and directed by Paul Schrader. It stars Ethan Hawke, Amanda Seyfried, and Cedric the Entertainer (credited as Cedric Kyles), and follows a Protestant minister faced with questions of faith and morality while serving as pastor of a dwindling historical church.

First Reformed was screened in the main competition section of the 74th Venice International Film Festival on August 31, 2017, and was theatrically released in the United States on May 18, 2018, by A24, where it grossed $3.4 million in its theatrical run. The film was praised by critics for Hawke's performance and Schrader's screenplay and direction. Both the National Board of Review and American Film Institute listed it as one of the Top 10 Films of 2018, with the former also awarding Schrader the award for Best Original Screenplay. At the Independent Spirit Awards, the film received nominations for Best Film, Best Male Lead (Hawke), Best Director and Best Screenplay. At the Critics' Choice Movie Awards, the film received two nominations for Best Actor and Best Original Screenplay.

== Accolades ==
Award	Date of ceremony	Category	Recipient(s)	Result	Ref.
Academy Awards	February 24, 2019	Best Original Screenplay	Paul Schrader	Nominated	
Alliance of Women Film Journalists	January 10, 2019	Best Actor	Ethan Hawke	Won	
Alliance of Women Film Journalists	January 10, 2019	Best Original Screenplay	Paul Schrader	Nominated	
American Film Institute	January 4, 2019	Top 10 Films of the Year	First Reformed	Won	
Chicago Film Critics Association	8 December 2018	Best Picture	First Reformed	Nominated	
Chicago Film Critics Association	8 December 2018	Best Director	Paul Schrader	Nominated	
Chicago Film Critics Association	8 December 2018	Best Actor	Ethan Hawke	Won	
Chicago Film Critics Association	8 December 2018	Best Original Screenplay	Paul Schrader	Won	
Critics' Choice Movie Awards	January 13, 2019	Best Actor	Ethan Hawke	Nominated	
Critics' Choice Movie Awards	January 13, 2019	Best Original Screenplay	Paul Schrader	Won	
Dallas–Fort Worth Film Critics Association	17 December 2018	Best Actor	Ethan Hawke	4th place	
Dallas–Fort Worth Film Critics Association	17 December 2018	Best Screenplay	Paul Schrader	2nd place	
Detroit Film Critics Society	December 3, 2018	Best Picture	First Reformed	Nominated	
Detroit Film Critics Society	December 3, 2018	Best Director	Paul Schrader	Nominated	
Detroit Film Critics Society	December 3, 2018	Best Actor	Ethan Hawke	Won	
Detroit Film Critics Society	December 3, 2018	Best Screenplay	Paul Schrader	Nominated	
Dublin Film Critics' Circle	December 20, 2018	Best Actor	Ethan Hawke	7th Place	
Gotham Awards	November 26, 2018	Best Feature	First Reformed	Nominated	
Gotham Awards	November 26, 2018	Best Screenplay	Paul Schrader	Won	
Gotham Awards	November 26, 2018	Best Actor	Ethan Hawke	Won	
Gotham Awards	November 26, 2018	Audience Award	First Reformed	Nominated	
Houston Film Critics Society	January 3, 2019	Best Picture	First Reformed	Nominated	
Houston Film Critics Society	January 3, 2019	Best Actor	Ethan Hawke	Nominated	
Houston Film Critics Society	January 3, 2019	Best Screenplay	Paul Schrader	Nominated	
Independent Spirit Awards	February 23, 2019	Best Film	Jack Binder, Greg Clark, Gary Hamilton, Victoria Hill, David Hinojosa, Frank Murray, Deepak Sikka and Christine Vachon	Nominated	
Independent Spirit Awards	February 23, 2019	Best Director	Paul Schrader	Nominated	
Independent Spirit Awards	February 23, 2019	Best Male Lead	Ethan Hawke	Won	
Independent Spirit Awards	February 23, 2019	Best Screenplay	Paul Schrader	Nominated	
London Film Critics' Circle	January 20, 2019	Film of the Year	First Reformed	Nominated	
London Film Critics' Circle	January 20, 2019	Actor of the Year	Ethan Hawke	Won	
London Film Critics' Circle	January 20, 2019	Screenwriter of the Year	Paul Schrader	Nominated	
Los Angeles Film Critics Association	December 9, 2018	Best Actor	Ethan Hawke	Won	
Los Angeles Online Film Critics Society	January 9, 2019	Best Independent Film	First Reformed	Nominated	
Los Angeles Online Film Critics Society	January 9, 2019	Best Actor	Ethan Hawke	Nominated	
National Board of Review	January 8, 2019	Top 10 Films	First Reformed	Won	
National Board of Review	January 8, 2019	Best Original Screenplay	Paul Schrader	Won	
New York Film Critics Circle	November 29, 2018	Best Actor	Ethan Hawke	Won	
New York Film Critics Circle	November 29, 2018	Best Screenplay	Paul Schrader	Won	
New York Film Critics Online	December 9, 2018	Top 10 Films	First Reformed	Won	
New York Film Critics Online	December 9, 2018	Best Actor	Ethan Hawke	Won	
Online Film Critics Society	January 2, 2019	Best Picture	First Reformed	4th Place	
Online Film Critics Society	January 2, 2019	Best Actor	Ethan Hawke	Won	
Online Film Critics Society	January 2, 2019	Best Original Screenplay	Paul Schrader	Won	
San Diego Film Critics Society	December 10, 2018	Best Actor	Ethan Hawke	Won	
San Diego Film Critics Society	December 10, 2018	Best Cinematography	Alexander Dynan	Nominated	
San Francisco Film Critics Circle	December 9, 2018	Best Film	First Reformed	Nominated	
San Francisco Film Critics Circle	December 9, 2018	Best Director	Paul Schrader	Nominated	
San Francisco Film Critics Circle	December 9, 2018	Best Actor	Ethan Hawke	Won	
San Francisco Film Critics Circle	December 9, 2018	Best Original Screenplay	Paul Schrader	Won	
Satellite Awards	February 17, 2019	Best Independent Film	First Reformed	Nominated	
Satellite Awards	February 17, 2019	Best Actor in a Motion Picture, Drama	Ethan Hawke	Nominated	
Satellite Awards	February 17, 2019	Best Original Screenplay	Paul Schrader	Nominated	
Seattle Film Critics Society	December 17, 2018	Best Picture of the Year	First Reformed	Nominated	
Seattle Film Critics Society	December 17, 2018	Best Director	Paul Schrader	Nominated	
Seattle Film Critics Society	December 17, 2018	Best Actor in a Leading Role	Ethan Hawke	Won	
Seattle Film Critics Society	December 17, 2018	Best Screenplay	Paul Schrader	Nominated	
St. Louis Film Critics Association	December 16, 2018	Best Film	First Reformed	Nominated	
St. Louis Film Critics Association	December 16, 2018	Best Actor	Ethan Hawke	Won	
St. Louis Film Critics Association	December 16, 2018	Best Original Screenplay	Paul Schrader	Nominated	
Time Critics Choice	November 15, 2018	The 10 Best Movies of 2018	First Reformed	3rd Place	
Time Critics Choice	November 15, 2018	The 10 Best Movie Performances of 2018	Ethan Hawke	2nd Place	
Toronto Film Critics Association	December 9, 2018	Best Film	First Reformed	Runner-up	
Toronto Film Critics Association	December 9, 2018	Best Director	Paul Schrader	Runner-up	
Toronto Film Critics Association	December 9, 2018	Best Actor	Ethan Hawke	Won	
Toronto Film Critics Association	December 9, 2018	Best Screenplay	Paul Schrader	Won (Note: Tied with Deborah Davis and Tony McNamara for The Favourite)	
Vancouver Film Critics Circle	17 December 2018	Best Picture	First Reformed	Nominated	
Vancouver Film Critics Circle	17 December 2018	Best Actor, Male	Ethan Hawke	Won	
Vancouver Film Critics Circle	17 December 2018	Best Director	Paul Schrader	Won	
Vancouver Film Critics Circle	17 December 2018	Best Screenplay	Paul Schrader	Won	
Washington D.C. Area Film Critics Association	December 3, 2018	Best Actor	Ethan Hawke	Nominated	
Washington D.C. Area Film Critics Association	December 3, 2018	Best Original Screenplay	Paul Schrader	Nominated	

== See also ==
- 2017 in film
