= Florida Film Critics Circle Awards 2018 =

Annual US film awards ceremony

23rd FFCC Awards

December 21, 2018

Best Picture:
The Favourite

The 23rd Florida Film Critics Circle Awards were held on December 21, 2018.

The nominations were announced on December 19, 2018, led by The Favourite with nine nominations.

== Winners and nominees ==
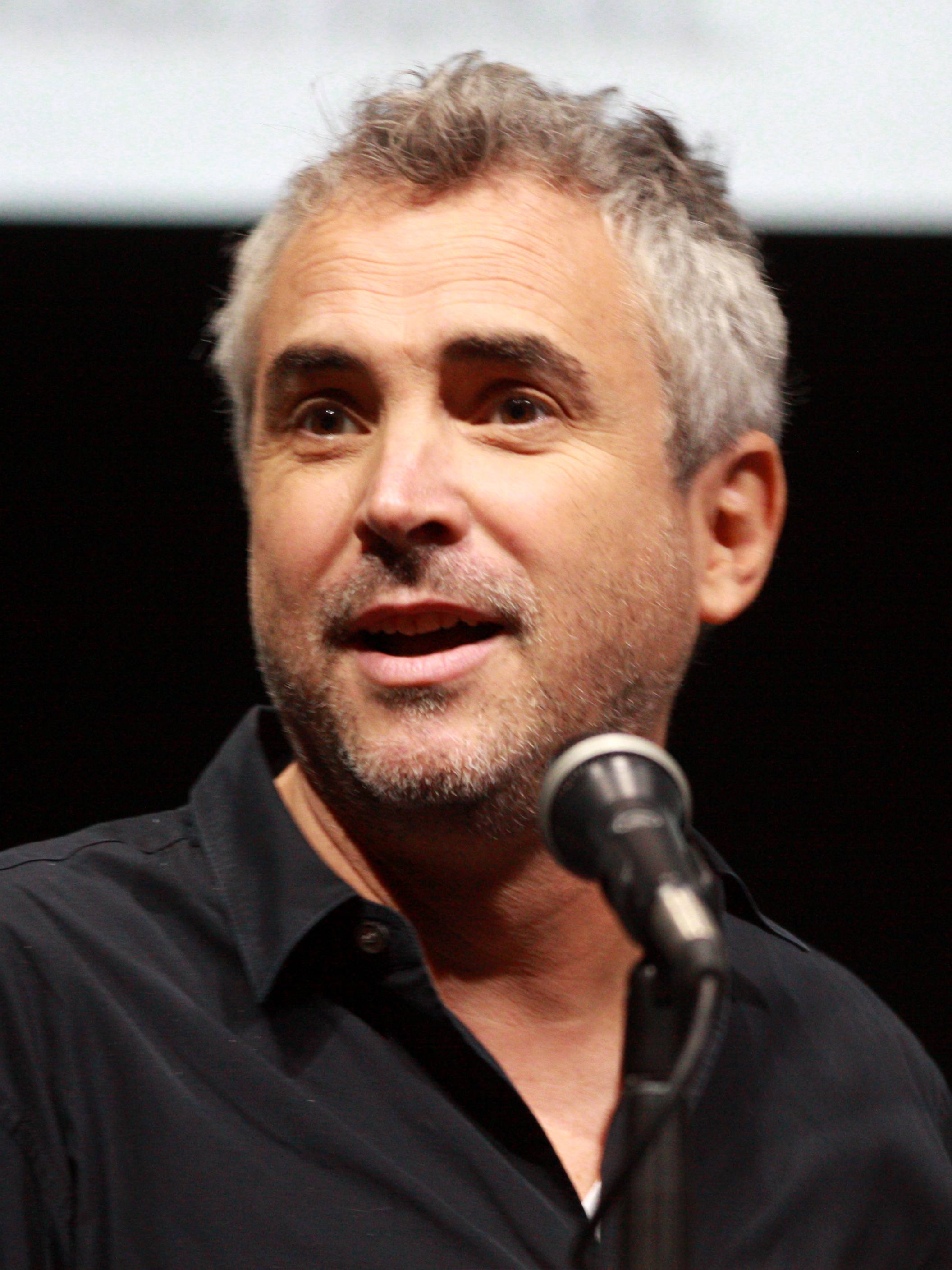
Alfonso Cuarón, Best Director winner

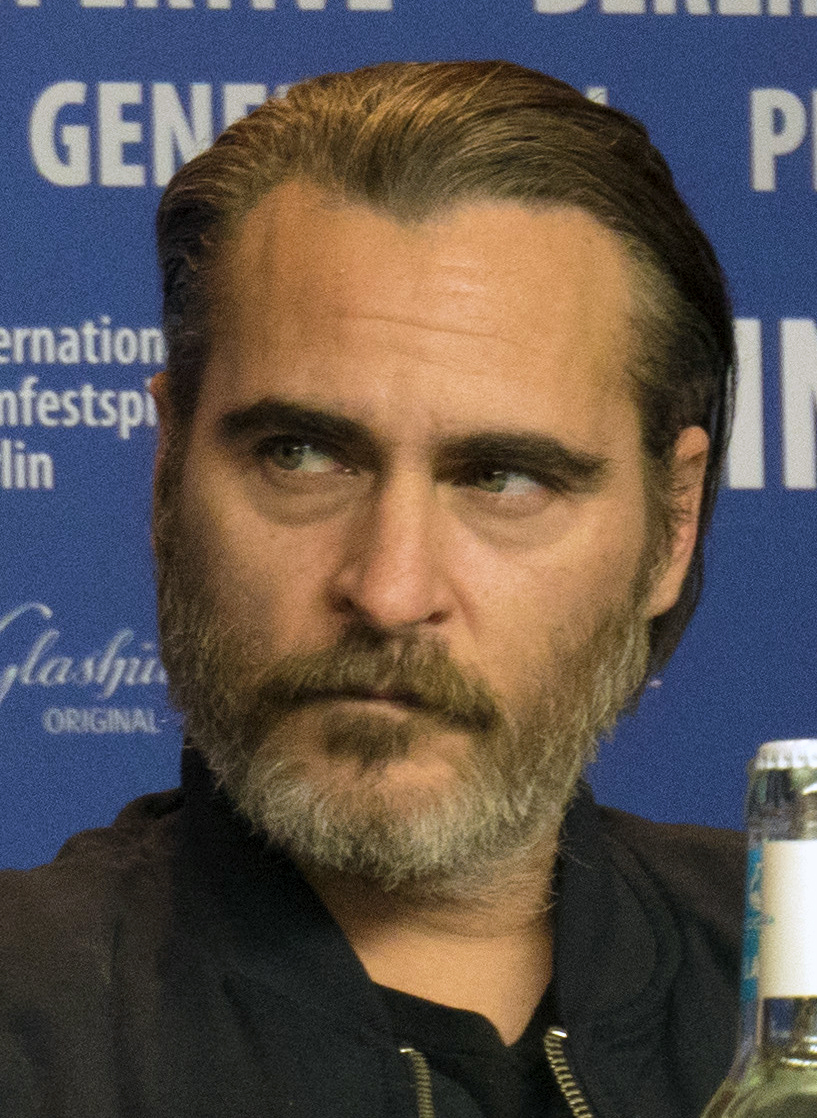
Joaquin Phoenix, Best Actor winner

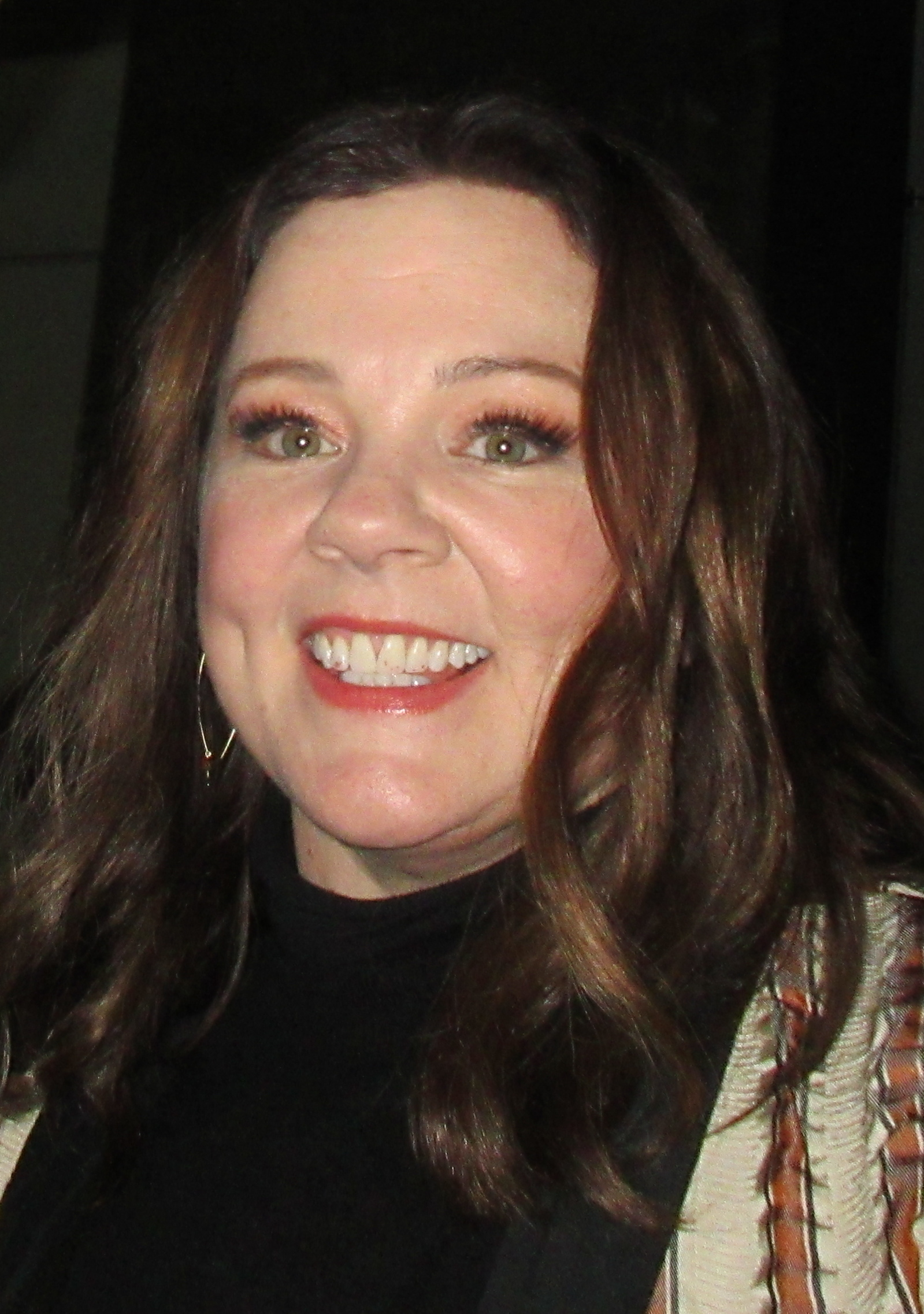
Melissa McCarthy, Best Actress winner

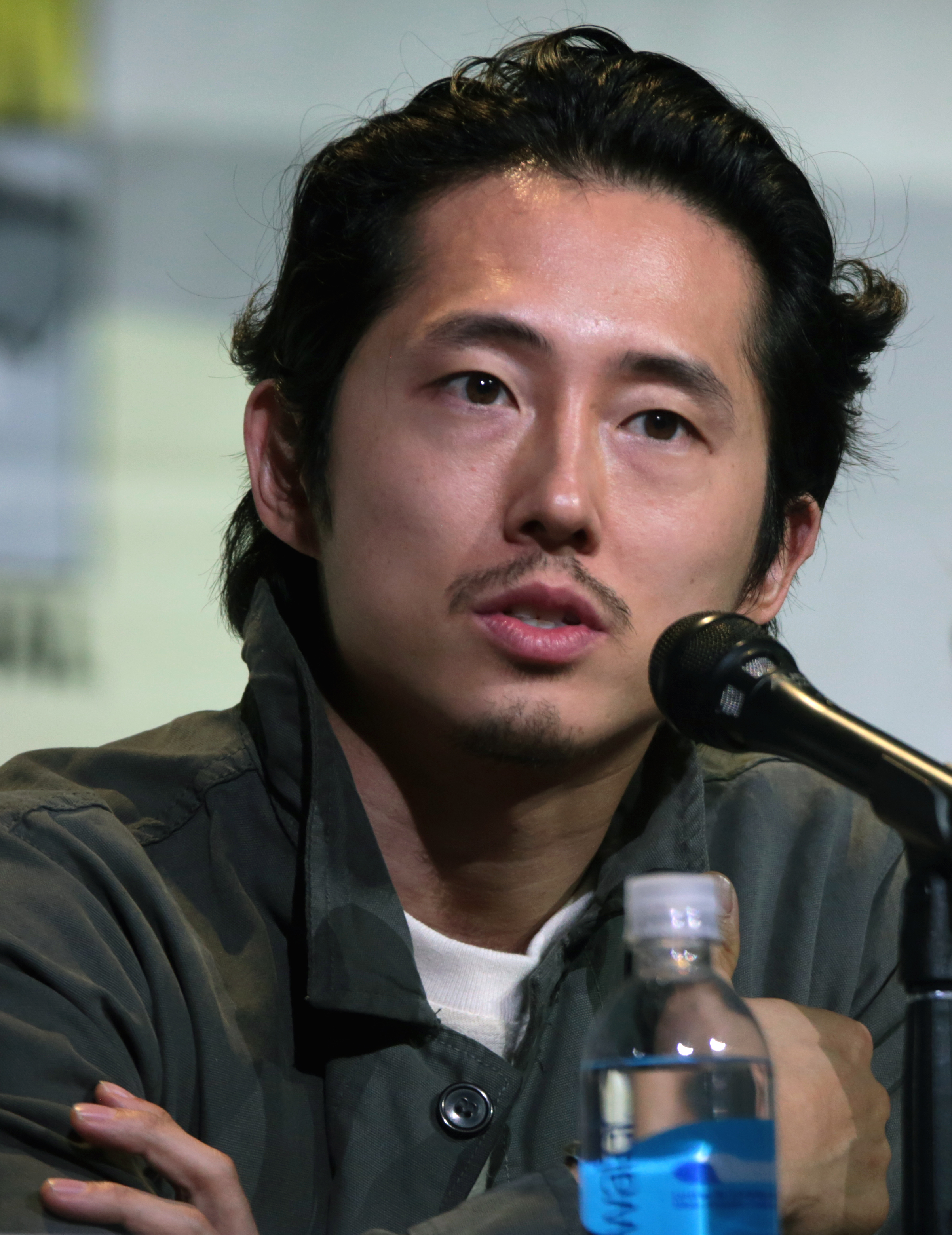
Steven Yeun, Best Supporting Actor winner

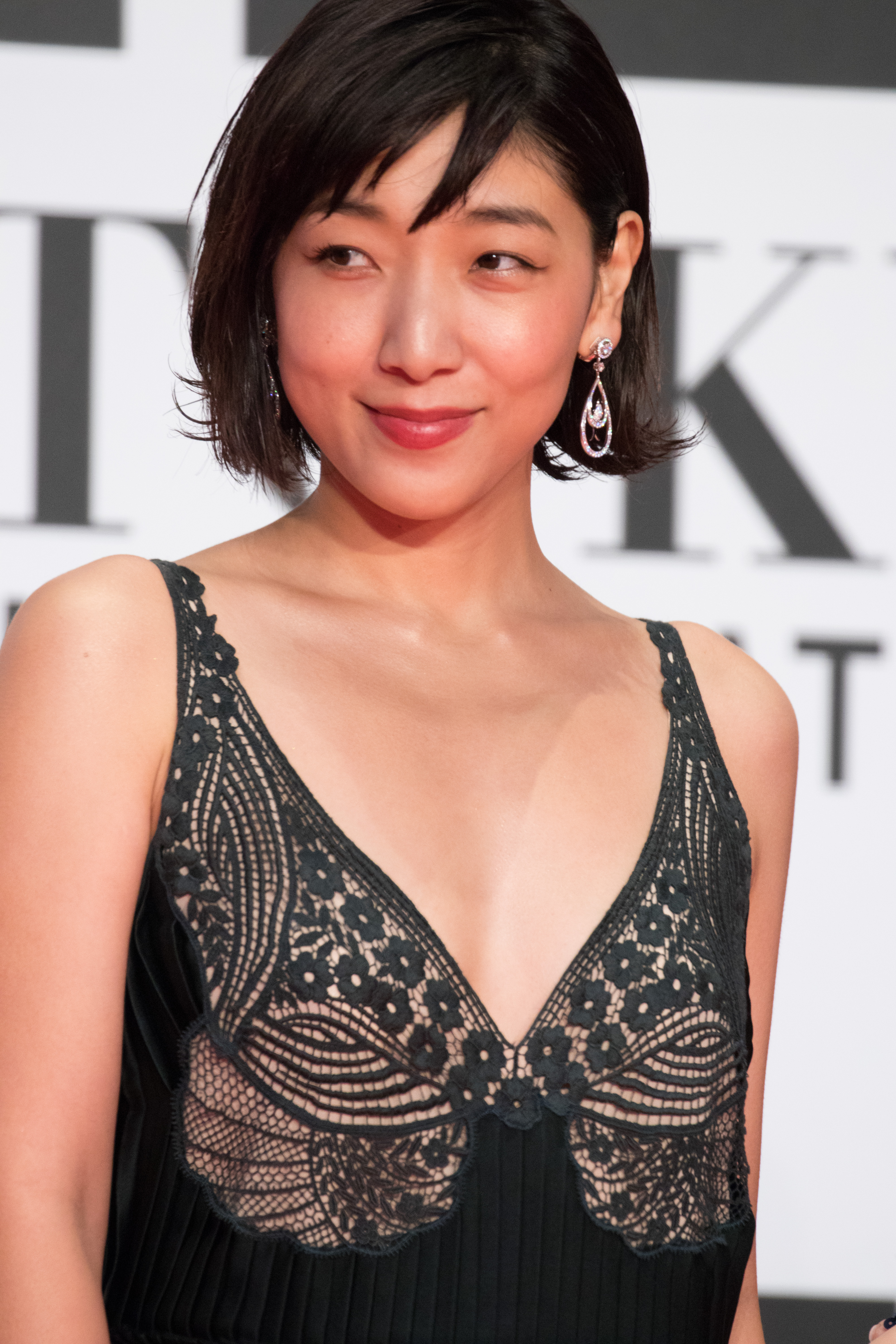
Sakura Ando, Best Supporting Actress winner

Winners are listed at the top of each list in bold, while the runner-ups for each category are listed under them.

Best Film	Best Director
**The Favourite**: First Man; If Beale Street Could Talk; The Rider; Roma	**Alfonso Cuarón – Roma**: Runner-up: Lynne Ramsay – You Were Never Really Here; Damien Chazelle – First Man; Peter Farrelly – Green Book; Hirokazu Kore-eda – Shoplifters; Yorgos Lanthimos – The Favourite
Best Actor	Best Actress
**Joaquin Phoenix – You Were Never Really Here as Joe**: Christian Bale – Vice as Dick Cheney; Willem Dafoe – At Eternity's Gate as Vincent van Gogh; Ethan Hawke – First Reformed as Reverend Ernst Toller; Viggo Mortensen – Green Book as Tony Lip	**Melissa McCarthy – Can You Ever Forgive Me? as Lee Israel**: Runner-up: Toni Collette – Hereditary as Annie Graham; Glenn Close – The Wife as Joan Castleman; Olivia Colman – The Favourite as Queen Anne; Natalie Portman – Vox Lux as Celeste
Best Supporting Actor	Best Supporting Actress
**Steven Yeun – Burning as Ben**: Runner-up: Richard E. Grant – Can You Ever Forgive Me? as Jack Hock; Mahershala Ali – Green Book as Dr. Don Shirley; Adam Driver – BlacKkKlansman as Flip Zimmerman; Hugh Grant – Paddington 2 as Phoenix Buchanan	**Sakura Ando – Shoplifters as Nobuyo Shibata**: Runner-up: Claire Foy – First Man as Janet Armstrong; Regina King – If Beale Street Could Talk as Sharon Rivers; Emma Stone – The Favourite as Abigail; Rachel Weisz – The Favourite as Lady Sarah
Best Adapted Screenplay	Best Original Screenplay
**Nicole Holofcener and Jeff Whitty – Can You Ever Forgive Me?**: Runner-up: Barry Jenkins – If Beale Street Could Talk; Lynne Ramsay – You Were Never Really Here; Josh Singer and James R. Hansen – First Man; Charlie Wachtel, David Rabinowitz, Kevin Willmott, and Spike Lee – BlacKkKlansman	**Boots Riley – Sorry to Bother You**: Runner-up: Bo Burnham – Eighth Grade; Deborah Davis and Tony McNamara – The Favourite; Paul Schrader – First Reformed; Bryan Woods, Scott Beck, and John Krasinski – A Quiet Place
Best Animated Film	Best Documentary
**Mirai**: Runner-up: Spider-Man: Into the Spider-Verse; Incredibles 2; Isle of Dogs	**Shirkers**: Free Solo; Monrovia, Indiana; Won't You Be My Neighbor?
Best Foreign Language Film	Best Ensemble
**Shoplifters**: Runner-up: Roma; Burning; Cold War	**The Favourite**: Runner-up: Support the Girls; BlacKkKlansman; Crazy Rich Asians; If Beale Street Could Talk
Best Art Direction / Production Design	Best Cinematography
**The Favourite**: Runner-up: Paddington 2; Annihilation; First Man; If Beale Street Could Talk; Roma	**Łukasz Żal – Cold War**: Runner-up: Alfonso Cuarón – Roma; James Laxton – If Beale Street Could Talk; Robbie Ryan – The Favourite; Linus Sandgren – First Man
Best Score	Best Visual Effects
**Justin Hurwitz – First Man**: Runner-up: Nicholas Britell – If Beale Street Could Talk; Jonny Greenwood – You Were Never Really Here; Ben Salisbury and Geoff Barrow – Annihilation	**Annihilation**: Runner-up: Avengers: Infinity War; First Man; Isle of Dogs; Ready Player One
Best First Film	Pauline Kael Breakout Award
**Bo Burnham – Eighth Grade**: Ari Aster – Hereditary; Bradley Cooper – A Star Is Born; Ofir Raul Graizer – The Cakemaker; Boots Riley – Sorry to Bother You	**Elsie Fisher – Eighth Grade**: Runner-up: Thomasin McKenzie – Leave No Trace; KiKi Layne – If Beale Street Could Talk
Golden Orange Award
**Alexa Lim Haas – Agua Viva**
