= Dallas–Fort Worth Film Critics Association Awards 2018 =

Annual US film awards ceremony

24th Dallas–Fort Worth Film Critics Association Awards
- Date: December 17, 2018
- Location: Dallas, Texas
- Country: United States
- Presented by: Dallas–Fort Worth Film Critics Association
- Website: dfwcritics.com

The 24th Dallas–Fort Worth Film Critics Association Awards honoring the best in film for 2018 were announced on December 17, 2018. These awards "recognizing extraordinary accomplishment in film" are presented annually by the Dallas–Fort Worth Film Critics Association (DFWFCA), based in the Dallas–Fort Worth metroplex region of Texas. The organization, founded in 1990, includes 30 film critics for print, radio, television, and internet publications based in north Texas. The Dallas–Fort Worth Film Critics Association began presenting its annual awards list in 1993.

Roma was the DFWFCA's most awarded film of 2018, taking three honors: Best Director (Alfonso Cuaron), Best Foreign Language Film and Best Cinematography (Cuaron).

== Winners and runners-up ==
=== Category awards ===
Best Picture	Best Foreign Language Film
1. A Star Is Born; 2. Roma; 3. The Favourite; 4. Vice; 5. BlacKkKlansman; 6. Black Panther; 7. Green Book; 8. If Beale Street Could Talk; 9. Eighth Grade; 10. Can You Ever Forgive Me?	1. Roma • Mexico; 2. Cold War • Poland; 3. Shoplifters • Japan; 4. Burning • South Korea; 5. Never Look Away • Germany
Best Actor	Best Actress
1. Christian Bale - Vice as Dick Cheney; 2. Rami Malek - Bohemian Rhapsody as Freddie Mercury; 3. Bradley Cooper - A Star Is Born as Jackson Maine; 4. Ethan Hawke - First Reformed as Ernst Toller; 5. Viggo Mortensen - Green Book as Tony Vallelonga	1. Olivia Colman - The Favourite as Queen Anne; 2. Lady Gaga - A Star Is Born as Ally Maine; 3. Melissa McCarthy - Can You Ever Forgive Me? as Lee Israel; 4. Glenn Close - The Wife as Joan Castleman; 5. Nicole Kidman - Destroyer as Erin Bell
Best Supporting Actor	Best Supporting Actress
1. Mahershala Ali - Green Book as Don Shirley; 2. Richard E. Grant - Can You Ever Forgive Me? as Jack Hock; 3. Sam Elliott - A Star Is Born as Bobby Maine; 4. Timothée Chalamet - Beautiful Boy as Nic Sheff; 5. Michael B. Jordan - Black Panther as Erik "Killmonger" Stevens	1. Regina King - If Beale Street Could Talk as Sharon Rivers; 2. Emma Stone - The Favourite as Abigail Hill; 3. Rachel Weisz - The Favourite as Sarah Churchill, Duchess of Marlborough; 4. Amy Adams - Vice as Lynne Cheney; 5. Claire Foy - First Man as Janet Shearon Armstrong; 6. Tilda Swinton - Suspiria as Madame Blanc
Best Director	Best Documentary Film
1. Alfonso Cuaron - Roma; 2. Bradley Cooper - A Star Is Born; 3. Yorgos Lanthimos - The Favourite; 4. Spike Lee - BlacKkKlansman; 5. Adam McKay - Vice	1. Won't You Be My Neighbor?; 2. Free Solo; 3. Three Identical Strangers; 4. RBG; 5. Minding the Gap
Best Animated Film	Best Cinematography
1. Isle of Dogs; 2. Spider-Man: Into the Spider-Verse	1. Alfonso Cuaron - Roma; 2. Robbie Ryan - The Favourite
Best Screenplay	Best Musical Score
1. Deboarah Davis and Tony McNamara - The Favourite; 2. Paul Schrader - First Reformed	1. Alexandre Desplat - Isle of Dogs; 2. Justin Hurwitz - First Man

=== Individual awards ===
==== Russell Smith Award ====
- The Rider for "best low-budget or cutting-edge independent film"
