= Alliance of Women Film Journalists Award for Best Actor =

Acting Award

The Alliance of Women Film Journalists Award for Best Actor is an annual Best Actor award given by the Alliance of Women Film Journalists. The award is often referred to as an EDA as a tribute to AWFJ founder Jennifer Merin's mother, actress Eda Reiss Merin. EDA is also an acronym for Excellent Dynamic Activism.

== 2000s ==
Year	Actor	Character	Film
2007	Daniel Day-Lewis †	Daniel Plainview	There Will Be Blood
2007	Johnny Depp ‡	Benjamin Barker / Sweeney Todd	Sweeney Todd: The Demon Barber of Fleet Street
2007	Tommy Lee Jones ‡	Hank Deerfield	In the Valley of Elah
2007	Viggo Mortensen ‡	Nikolai Luzhin	Eastern Promises
2008	Sean Penn †	Harvey Milk	Milk
2008	Richard Jenkins ‡	Walter Vale	The Visitor
2008	Mickey Rourke ‡	Randy "The Ram" Robinson	The Wrestler
2009	Jeff Bridges †	Otis "Bad" Blake	Crazy Heart
2009	George Clooney ‡	Ryan Bingham	Up in the Air
2009	Jeremy Renner ‡	Sergeant First Class William James	The Hurt Locker

== 2010s ==
Year	Actor	Character	Film
2010	Colin Firth †	King George VI	The King's Speech
2010	Javier Bardem ‡	Uxbal	Biutiful
2010	Jeff Bridges ‡	Rooster Cogburn	True Grit
2010	Jesse Eisenberg ‡	Mark Zuckerberg	The Social Network
2010	James Franco ‡	Aron Ralston	127 Hours
2011	Michael Fassbender	Brandon Sullivan	Shame
2011	George Clooney ‡	Matt King	The Descendants
2011	Jean Dujardin †	George Valentin	The Artist
2011	Brad Pitt ‡	Billy Beane	Moneyball
2011	Michael Shannon	Curtis LaForche	Take Shelter
2012	Daniel Day-Lewis †	Abraham Lincoln	Lincoln
2012	John Hawkes	Mark O'Brien	The Sessions
2012	Joaquin Phoenix ‡	Freddy Quell	The Master
2013	Matthew McConaughey †	Ron Woodroof	Dallas Buyers Club
2013	Bruce Dern ‡	Woody Grant	Nebraska
2013	Chiwetel Ejiofor ‡	Solomon Northup	12 Years a Slave
2013	Oscar Isaac	Llewyn Davis	Inside Llewyn Davis
2013	Joaquin Phoenix	Theodore Twombly	Her
2013	Robert Redford	Our Man	All Is Lost
2014	Michael Keaton ‡	Riggan Thomson	Birdman
2014	Jake Gyllenhaal	Louis "Lou" Bloom	Nightcrawler
2014	Eddie Redmayne †	Stephen Hawking	The Theory of Everything
2015	Leonardo DiCaprio †	Hugh Glass	The Revenant
2015	Matt Damon ‡	Mark Watney	The Martian
2015	Michael Fassbender ‡	Steve Jobs	Steve Jobs
2015	Eddie Redmayne ‡	Lili Elbe	The Danish Girl
2016	Casey Affleck †	Lee Chandler	Manchester by the Sea
2016	Joel Edgerton	Richard Loving	Loving
2016	Ryan Gosling ‡	Sebastian Wilder	La La Land
2016	Tom Hanks	Chesley "Sully" Sullenberger	Sully
2016	Denzel Washington ‡	Troy Maxson	Fences
2017	Gary Oldman †	Winston Churchill	Darkest Hour
2017	Timothée Chalamet ‡	Elio Perlman	Call Me by Your Name
2017	Daniel Kaluuya ‡	Chris Washington	Get Out
2018	Christian Bale	Dick Cheney	Vice
2018	Willem Dafoe	Vincent van Gogh	At Eternity's Gate
2018	Ben Foster	Will	Leave No Trace
2018	Ethan Hawke	Pastor Ernst Toller	First Reformed
2018	Rami Malek	Freddie Mercury	Bohemian Rhapsody
2018	Viggo Mortensen	Frank "Tony Lip" Vallelonga	Green Book
