= Dimiter Marinov =

Bulgarian-American actor (born 1964)

Dimitar D. Marinov
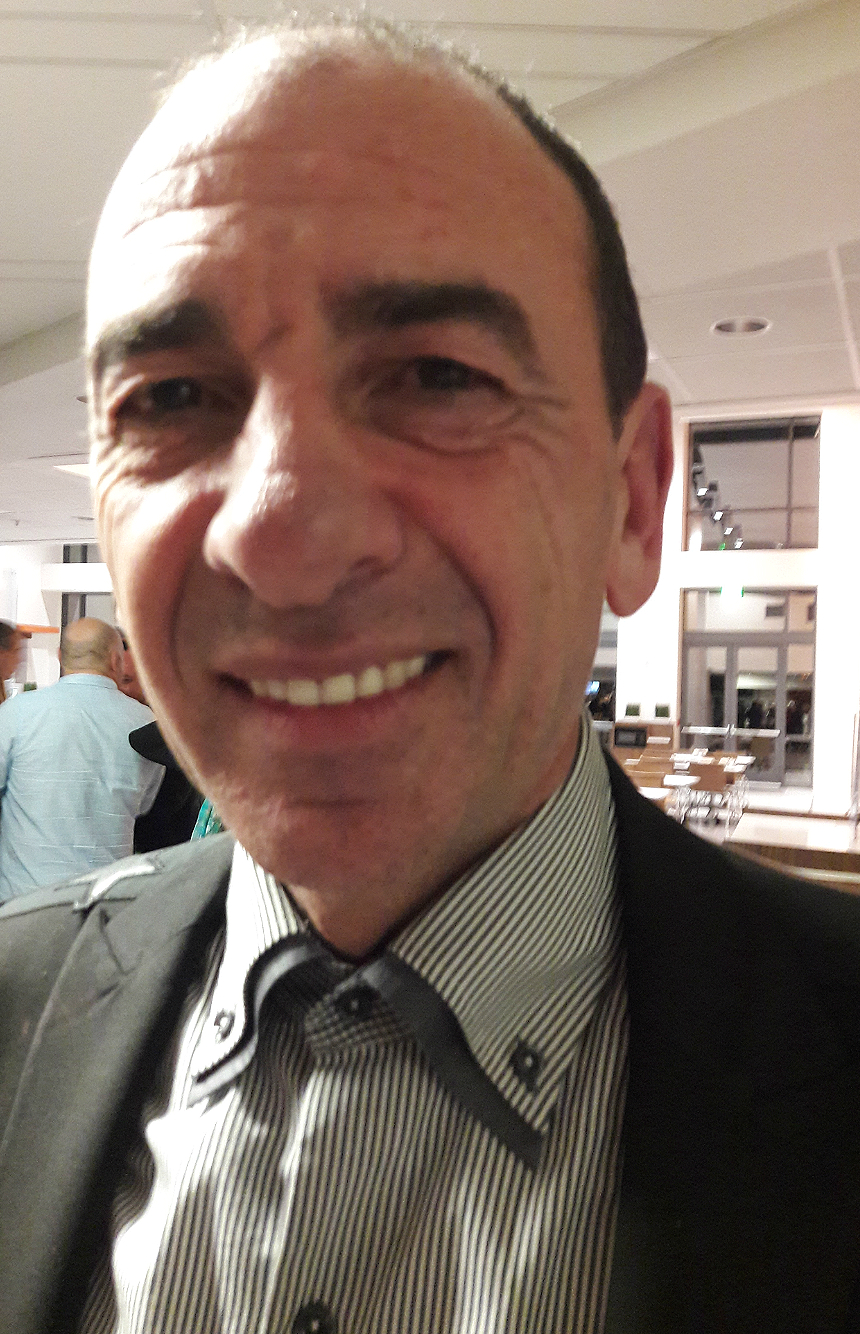
- Born: Dimitar Marinov; October 6, 1964 (age 61); Sofia, Bulgaria
- Citizenship: Bulgaria/United States
- Education: NATFA
- Occupations: Actor; Violinist; Writer
- Years active: 1979–present
- Notable work: Green Book
- Spouse: Jennifer Marinov (m. 2003)
- Children: 2

Dimiter D. Marinov or Dimitar Marinov (Bulgarian: Димитър Маринов, born October 6, 1964) is a Bulgarian-American actor. In 2019, he became the first Bulgarian to go on the red carpet at the 91st Academy Awards, after he played a supporting role in the film Green Book, which won Best Picture.

== Early life ==
Marinov was born in Sofia, Bulgaria and was adopted by one of Marinovi family, a well-known tobacco company owners, used as a prototype of the Dimitar Dimov's best-selling novel Tobacco. At the age of 11, he became first violin in a youth symphony orchestra and traveled all over Western and Eastern Europe, the US and the Middle East. Following the completion of an associate degree in Classical Music, he discovered his passion for acting.

At the age of 18, Marinov was drafted into the Bulgarian Army which was mandatory during the Communist era. He was assigned to an Artillery Intelligence Unit. Within a year of his service, Dimiter was detained by the People's Military Tribunal. He was accused of conspiring against the People's Republic and trying to escape to the West. The verdict was three years political imprisonment. Regardless of the difficulties that followed after his prison term, Dimiter graduated with a master's degree as an honor student from the Bulgarian National Academy for Theatre and Film in Sofia. In 1990, Dimiter traveled throughout Europe, Canada and the United States as an actor-singer in a Bulgarian folk-jazz stage anthology entitled - Mystery of Bulgarian Voices. Following the last performance in the United States, Dimiter defected as a political refugee in Knoxville, Tennessee.

He took on various jobs including dishwasher, air-brush artist and a handyman. In 1993, Marinov drove across country in his Volkswagen Bug to San Diego, California. The diverse environment helped him to find new venues to grow and establish himself as a "new American". Playing his violin and singing in a vast number of restaurants while working as a coffee barista, he managed in 1996 to become an owner of a coffee shop, restaurant and catering business. Marinov began his US acting career on the stage at The San Diego Repertory Theatre in 1999. In the year 2000, he pursued his passionate dream of working with young children. Partnering with Michael Ari Wulffhart they created, developed and taught numerous children educational programs for the YMCA and the San Diego Zoo.

== Career ==
After completing a three-year business venture with his family in Costa Rica from 2006 to 2009, Marinov returned to the United States in order to expand his acting career in commercials, television and film.

In the Bandito Brothers production Act of Valor, which was his very first US film audition, Marinov made his big screen debut as the diabolical Kerimov, the Russian scientist and smuggler. Marinov's "big break" was in Green Book directed by Peter Farrelly. Marinov co-stars with Viggo Mortensen and Mahershala Ali. The movie received a dozen awards, including the Academy Award for Best Picture and Golden Globe Award for Best Screenplay After the filming of Green Book, Marinov also took on the task of directing Southwest High School's musical production of "Charlie and the Chocolate Factory".

== Filmography ==
=== Film ===
Year	Title	Role	Notes
1979	Tri od more	Zoro	
1990	Sofiyska istoriya		
2012	Act of Valor	Kerimov	
2014	Behaving Badly	Mantas Bartuska	
2016	Triple 9	Driver	
2017	Hell or Hot Sauce	D'miter	Short film
2017	Russian American	Arkadi	
2017	A Picture with Yuki	Major Grigor Antonov	
2018	Green Book	Oleg	
2020	No Escape	Igor	
2021	The Little Things	St.Agnes hotel manager	

=== Television ===
Year	Title	Role	Notes
2001	18 Wheels of Justice	Interpreter / Agent	Episode: "The Interrogation"
2011	Mr. Sunshine	Uncle	Episode: "The Assistant"
2011	Law & Order: LA	Chess Player #1	Episode: "Plummer Park"
2012	NCIS	Ghenna Kozlov	Episode: "Up in Smoke"
2013	Touch	Taxi driver	Episode: "Closer"
2014	Brooklyn Nine-Nine	Alexei Bisko	Episode: "Stakeout"
2015	Agent Carter	Fyodor	Episode: "A Sin to Err"
2015	NCIS: Los Angeles	Limo driver	Episode: "Chernoff, K."
2015	Scorpion	General Zoric	Episode: "Cuba Libre"
2016	The Odd Couple	Sasha	Episode: "Plummer Park"
2016	The Americans	Fyodor	Episode: "Persona Non Grata"
2016	Ray Donovan	Russian Man	Episode: "Get Even Before Leavin'"
2016	Better Things	Donation Guy	Episode: "Hair of the Dog"
2017	Baskets	Vladimir	Episode: "Circus"
2017	Angie Tribeca	Anton Chekhov	Episode: "Hey, I'm Solvin' Here!"
2017	Shooter	Russian Officer	Episode: "That'll Be the Day"
2017	Shut Eye	Landlord	Episode: "Guys and Dolls"
2018	Barry	Abbas	Episode: "Chapter Four: Commit...To You"
2018	Strangers	Vlad	Episode: "The Disappearance of Katia Romaine"
2019	S.W.A.T.	George	Episode "sea legs"
2023–present	For All Mankind	Ilya Breshov	13 episodes

== Personal life ==
On 31 December 2003 Marinov married his longtime partner. They have two sons, (one born December 30, 2005, and the other May 10, 2013).
