= Walter Volpatto =

Motion Picture Colorist

- Born: 15 January 1971 (age 55); Turin, Piedmont, Italy
- Website: www.waltervolpatto.com

Walter Volpatto is an American motion picture colourist based in Hollywood, California.

== Career ==
Volpatto grades for some of Hollywood's most visionary directors and cinematographers, such as Francis Ford Coppola (Megalopolis), Christopher Nolan (Dunkirk), Peter Farrelly (Green Book), and Rian Johnson (Star Wars: The Last Jedi).

Volpatto has received awards and nominations from the Hollywood Professional Association for Outstanding Color Grading awards for Winning Time: The Rise of the Lakers Dynasty (2023), Sweet Tooth (2021) and Green Book (2019). He also earned FilmLight Color Award nominations for Winning Time (2022, 2023). His wide-ranging credits include such memorable features as Hustlers, Red Notice, Moonfall, Rampage, Interstellar, San Andreas, Bad Moms, Independence Day: Resurgence, and The Master.

An Academy of Motion Picture Arts and Sciences Member, and Associate Member of the ASC, Volpatto is also a consultant to the Academy Science and Technology Council, including the academy's case study in film-to-digital reformatting and remastering using ACES, (the Academy Color Encoding System), featuring Marcus Dillistone's Royal Premiered film, The Troop.

In November 2023, Volpatto joined Hollywood postproduction facility Picture Shop, having previously been at Company 3, EFilm, and Fotokem.
