= Brian Hayes Currie =

American screenwriter (born 1961)

- Born: 1961 (age 64–65); Peabody, Massachusetts, U.S.
- Education: St. John's Preparatory School (Danvers, Massachusetts)
- Occupations: Screenwriter, actor, producer
- Years active: 1990s–present
- Notable work: Green Book (film), The Greatest Beer Run Ever
- Awards: Academy Award for Best Original Screenplay (2019), Golden Globe Award for Best Screenplay (2019)

Brian Hayes Currie (born 1961) is an American screenwriter, actor, and producer. He is best known for co-writing the Academy Award-winning screenplay for Green Book (2018) and the biographical film The Greatest Beer Run Ever (2022).

== Early life and education ==
Currie was born and raised in Peabody, Massachusetts. He attended St. John's Preparatory School in Danvers, where he was encouraged by teachers to pursue storytelling, creative writing, and public speaking.

He moved to California in the early 1990s, where he held various jobs, including nightclub work, while pursuing acting and writing. Over the years, he sold around a dozen screenplays, though most were never produced.

== Career ==
=== Breakthrough with Green Book ===
In the early 2000s, Currie returned to Peabody to care for his ailing mother, who had been diagnosed with Alzheimer's disease. He remained there for over a decade, calling it “the best thing I ever did.”

During this time, he reconnected with longtime friend Nick Vallelonga, who visited Peabody to see his family. They began discussing stories about Vallelonga's father, Frank “Tony Lip” Vallelonga, and his travels through the segregated South with African-American pianist Don Shirley. Currie brought the idea to director Peter Farrelly, and the three collaborated to write the screenplay at Farrelly’s cabin in Ojai, California.

Green Book premiered at the Toronto International Film Festival in 2018, where it won the People's Choice Award. The film grossed over $320 million worldwide and received widespread acclaim. Currie shared the Academy Award for Best Original Screenplay and the Golden Globe Award for Best Screenplay with Vallelonga and Farrelly.

=== Later projects ===
In 2022, Currie co-wrote the war drama The Greatest Beer Run Ever with Farrelly and Pete Jones. The film starred Zac Efron and was based on the true story of John "Chickie" Donohue, a New Yorker who delivered beer to friends fighting in the Vietnam War. Currie continues to collaborate with Farrelly on other screenwriting and production projects.

== Filmography ==
Year	Title	Writer	Actor	Producer	Notes
1998	Armageddon	–	Yes	–	Minor role
2006	Two Tickets to Paradise	Yes	Yes	–	–
2018	Green Book	Yes	Yes (Cameo)	Yes	Co-wrote with Nick Vallelonga and Peter Farrelly
2022	The Greatest Beer Run Ever	Yes	–	–	Co-wrote with Peter Farrelly and Pete Jones

== Awards and nominations ==
- Academy Award for Best Original Screenplay (2019) – Green Book
- Golden Globe Award for Best Screenplay (2019) – Green Book
- People's Choice Award – 2018 Toronto International Film Festival – Green Book

== Personal life ==
Currie spent over 12 years in Peabody caring for his mother after she was diagnosed with Alzheimer’s. He’s called the experience life-changing, saying it deeply shaped both his personal and professional outlook. His mother, a classically trained pianist, had a lasting impact on his love of music—something that later influenced how he portrayed Don Shirley’s character in Green Book.
