= National Board of Review Awards 2018 =

Annual US film awards ceremony

90th NBR Awards
Best Film: Green Book

The 90th National Board of Review Awards, honoring the best in film for 2018, were announced on November 27, 2018.

== Top 10 Films ==
Films listed alphabetically except top, which is ranked as Best Film of the Year:

Green Book

- The Ballad of Buster Scruggs
- Black Panther
- Can You Ever Forgive Me?
- Eighth Grade
- First Reformed
- If Beale Street Could Talk
- Mary Poppins Returns
- A Quiet Place
- Roma
- A Star Is Born

== Winners ==
Best Film:

- Green Book

Best Director:

- Bradley Cooper – A Star Is Born

Best Actor:

- Viggo Mortensen – Green Book

Best Actress:

- Lady Gaga – A Star Is Born

Best Supporting Actor:

- Sam Elliott – A Star Is Born

Best Supporting Actress:

- Regina King – If Beale Street Could Talk

Best Original Screenplay:

- Paul Schrader – First Reformed

Best Adapted Screenplay:

- Barry Jenkins – If Beale Street Could Talk

Best Animated Feature:

- Incredibles 2

Best Foreign Language Film:

- Cold War

Best Documentary:

- RBG

Best Ensemble:

- Crazy Rich Asians

Breakthrough Performance:

- Thomasin McKenzie – Leave No Trace

Best Directorial Debut:

- Bo Burnham – Eighth Grade

William K. Everson Film History Award:

- The Other Side of the Wind and They'll Love Me When I'm Dead

NBR Freedom of Expression:

- 22 July
- On Her Shoulders

== Top Foreign Films ==
Cold War

- Burning
- Custody
- The Guilty
- Happy as Lazzaro
- Shoplifters

== Top Documentaries ==
RBG

- Crime + Punishment
- Free Solo
- Minding the Gap
- Three Identical Strangers
- Won't You Be My Neighbor?

== Top Independent Films ==
- The Death of Stalin
- Lean on Pete
- Leave No Trace
- Mid90s
- The Old Man & the Gun
- The Rider
- Searching
- Sorry to Bother You
- We the Animals
- You Were Never Really Here
