= Tony Lip =

American actor (1930–2013)

- Vallelonga in 2010
- Born: Frank Anthony Vallelonga; July 30, 1930; Beaver Falls, Pennsylvania, U.S.
- Died: January 4, 2013 (aged 82); Teaneck, New Jersey, U.S.
- Occupation: Actor
- Years active: 1972–2008
- Spouse: Dolores Venere (died 1999)
- Children: 2, including Nick

Frank Anthony Vallelonga Sr. (July 30, 1930 – January 4, 2013), better known by his stage name Tony Lip, was an American actor. He was best known for his portrayal of crime boss Carmine Lupertazzi in the HBO series The Sopranos. Lip portrayed real-life Bonanno crime family mobster Philip Giaccone in Donnie Brasco, and real-life Lucchese crime family mobster Francesco Manzo in Goodfellas. It was at the Copacabana nightclub that he first met Francis Ford Coppola and Louis DiGiaimo, leading to a small role in The Godfather, his film debut. He also co-wrote the book Shut Up and Eat! (2005).

His life in the early 1960s, when he was the driver and bodyguard for the Black classical pianist Don Shirley, was dramatized in the 2018 film Green Book, in which he was portrayed by Viggo Mortensen. The film won numerous accolades, including the Academy Award for Best Picture.

== Early life ==
Frank Anthony Vallelonga was born in Beaver Falls, Pennsylvania, the son of Italian parents, Nazarena and Nicholas Vallelonga. His family moved to the Bronx when he was an infant, and he grew up on 215th Street. He earned the nickname "Lip" in his childhood, as a reference to his reputation for having the ability to talk people into doing things he wanted them to do.

== Career ==
From 1951 to 1953, he served in the United States Army and was stationed in West Germany. He worked at the Copacabana nightclub, starting in 1961, as maître d'hôtel and supervisor.

He was working as a bouncer when he was hired to drive and protect pianist Don Shirley on a tour through the Jim Crow South from 1962 to 1963. This tour is the basis of the 2018 film Green Book, co-written by Lip's son Nick Vallelonga, in which Lip is portrayed by Viggo Mortensen. Mortensen received an Academy Award for Best Actor nomination for his portrayal of Lip.

== Personal life and death ==
Lip resided in Paramus, New Jersey, with his wife, Dolores Vallelonga (née Venere), who died in 1999. He had two sons, Nick Vallelonga and Frank Vallelonga Jr., and one grandson, Frank Vallelonga.

Lip died at age 82 on January 4, 2013, in Teaneck, New Jersey. His cause of death was renal failure.

== Filmography ==
- 1972 The Godfather as Wedding Guest (uncredited)
- 1974 Crazy Joe as Andy (uncredited)
- 1974 The Super Cops as Detroit Hitman (uncredited)
- 1975 Dog Day Afternoon as Cop At JFK (uncredited)
- 1980 Raging Bull as Nightclubber (uncredited)
- 1984 The Pope of Greenwich Village as Frankie
- 1985 Year of the Dragon as Lenny Carranza
- 1987 Heart as Max
- 1988 Last Rites as Cabbie
- 1989 Lock Up as Guard
- 1990 Goodfellas as Frankie "The Wop"
- 1991 29th Street as Nicky "Bad Lungs"
- 1992 Innocent Blood as Frank
- 1992-1996 Law & Order as Doc / Bobby Murrows
- 1993 Who's the Man? as Vito Pasquale
- 1994 A Brilliant Disguise as Pete
- 1995 In the Kingdom of the Blind, the Man with One Eye Is King as Paulie
- 1997 Donnie Brasco as Philly Lucky
- 1998 A Brooklyn State of Mind as The Bartender
- 2001-2007 The Sopranos as Carmine Lupertazzi
- 2005 The Signs of the Cross as Mario
- 2006 All In as Darkman
- 2008 Stiletto as Gus
