= First Reformed =

2017 film by Paul Schrader

- Theatrical release poster
- Directed by: Paul Schrader
- Written by: Paul Schrader
- Produced by: Christine Vachon; David Hinojosa; Frank Murray; Jack Binder; Greg Clark; Victoria Hill; Gary Hamilton; Deepak Sikka
- Starring: Ethan Hawke; Amanda Seyfried; Cedric Kyles; Victoria Hill; Philip Ettinger
- Cinematography: Alexander Dynan
- Edited by: Benjamin Rodriguez Jr.
- Music by: Lustmord
- Production companies: Killer Films; Omeira Studio Partners; Fibonacci Films; Arclight Films (International); Big Indie Pictures
- Distributed by: A24 (United States); Universal Pictures (International)
- Release dates: August 31, 2017 (Venice); May 18, 2018 (United States)
- Running time: 114 minutes
- Country: United States
- Language: English
- Budget: $3.5 million
- Box office: $4 million

First Reformed is a 2017 American psychological drama film written and directed by Paul Schrader. It stars Ethan Hawke as a minister of a small congregation in upstate New York who grapples with mounting despair brought on by tragedy, worldly concerns, and a tormented past. Amanda Seyfried, Cedric Kyles, Victoria Hill, and Philip Ettinger appear in supporting roles.

The film premiered at the 74th Venice International Film Festival on August 31, 2017, and was theatrically released in the United States on May 18, 2018, by A24. It grossed $4 million worldwide and received positive reviews from critics, who mostly praised Hawke's performance and Schrader's direction and writing. Both the National Board of Review and the American Film Institute selected First Reformed as one of the top ten films of 2018, and Schrader was nominated for Best Original Screenplay at the 91st Academy Awards. At the 24th Critics' Choice Awards, Hawke was nominated for Best Actor and Schrader won Best Original Screenplay. At the 34th Independent Spirit Awards, the film was nominated for Best Feature, Best Director, and Best Screenplay, while Hawke won Best Male Lead.

== Plot ==
Reverend Ernst Toller is writing down his thoughts in a journal for a year, after which he intends to destroy it. He leads First Reformed Church in Snowbridge, New York, a 250-year-old Dutch Reformed Church that was a stop on the Underground Railroad; it faces dwindling attendance under Toller's leadership, which has taken the church in a new direction away from its historical focus on Reformed theology, serving mostly as a tourist attraction. In trying to manage his problems, including alcoholism and health ailments, Toller reads Catholic writings (G. K. Chesterton, Thomas Merton and The Cloud of Unknowing). This new spiritual direction leads him to seek support from a nearby charismatic megachurch, Abundant Life, which owns First Reformed.

A former military chaplain, Toller is also struggling with the death of his son, who was killed in the Iraq War; Toller had encouraged him to enlist. He meets parishioner Mary Mensana, who is seeking counseling for her radical-environmentalist husband, Michael. Michael says he wants Mary, who is 20 weeks pregnant, to get an abortion, because he does not want to bring a child into a world that will be rendered almost uninhabitable by climate change.

Mary finds a suicide vest belonging to Michael in their garage. Toller takes it, promising to counsel Michael about it. Mary and Toller discuss going to the police, but Toller feels that would dramatically worsen Michael's state. Just before their next appointment, Michael sends Toller a text message asking to meet in a local park. Toller arrives to find Michael dead of a self-inflicted gunshot. In accordance with Michael's will and testament, a service is held at a local toxic-waste dump, where his ashes are scattered. Meanwhile, plans are underway to celebrate First Reformed's semiquincentennial with a service attended by various politicians and an industrialist, Edward Balq, a major financial backer of Abundant Life. At a meeting in a diner, Toller argues with Balq over climate change after Balq accuses Michael's memorial service of being a political act by Abundant Life. Balq calls climate change "complicated", but Toller sees it as a straightforward matter of Christian stewardship.

Toller reluctantly sees a doctor, who suspects stomach cancer and schedules tests. Using Michael's laptop, which he took after his suicide to prevent the police from discovering his radicalism and making trouble for Mary, Toller researches Michael's concerns, including what inspired him to make the suicide vest. One night, Mary visits Toller at the church's parsonage, and he plays Michael's role in a nonsexual rite of physical intimacy that she and Michael used to perform, "The Magical Mystery Tour", in which Mary lay atop him and they shared each other's breath.

Toller begs Mary not to attend the anniversary service. Preparing for his role in the ceremony, he puts on the vest and arms it. When he sees Mary enter the church, he removes the vest and instead wraps himself in barbed wire under his alb. He pours a glass full of chemical drain cleaner and is about to drink it when Mary interrupts him. The two embrace, kissing passionately.

== Cast ==
- Ethan Hawke as Reverend Ernst Toller, the minister at First Reformed Church
- Amanda Seyfried as Mary Mensana, a pregnant parishioner
- Cedric Kyles as Head Pastor Joel Jeffers of Abundant Life, an evangelical megachurch
- Victoria Hill as Esther, a choir director at Abundant Life
- Philip Ettinger as Michael Mensana, Mary's husband
- Michael Gaston as Edward Balq, a local industrialist and financial supporter of Abundant Life
- Bill Hoag as John Elder, the organist at First Reformed
- Frank Rodriguez as the sheriff
- Gary Lee Mahmoud as Toller's doctor
- Sue Jean Kim as Ms. Suriya, who brings her students to First Reformed on a field trip
- Van Hansis as Roger, the leader of the Abundant Life youth group
- Ramon Nuñez as Jason, a happy member of the Abundant Life youth group
- Delano Montgomery as Jake, a conservative member of the Abundant Life youth group
- Satchel Eden Bell as Cynthia, a member of the Abundant Life youth group concerned about her father

== Production ==
The restrained style of First Reformed recalls the films of Yasujiro Ozu, Robert Bresson, and Carl Theodor Dreyer that Schrader wrote about in his 1972 book Transcendental Style in Film. Elements of the script allude to Bresson's Diary of a Country Priest (1951), Ingmar Bergman's Winter Light (1963), and the work of Dreyer, as well as Schrader's own script for Taxi Driver (1976). Schrader said that Paweł Pawlikowski's film Ida (2013) inspired him to shoot in a 1.33:1 aspect ratio, saying it "drives the vertical lines, so you get more of the human body in the frame." Before approaching Seyfried, Schrader discussed casting Michelle Williams as Mary.

Principal photography lasted 20 days, with a budget of $3.5 million. The film was shot around Brooklyn and Queens, New York, including the building and grounds of the Zion Episcopal Church in Douglaston.

== Release ==
First Reformed premiered in the main competition section of the 74th Venice International Film Festival on August 31, 2017. It also screened at the 44th Telluride Film Festival on September 2 and the 42nd Toronto International Film Festival on September 12.

In September 2017, A24 acquired the film's North American distribution rights. It had a limited theatrical release in the US on May 18, 2018, and was theatrically released in the United Kingdom on July 13. On January 31, 2023, Archway Editions published the screenplay with an introduction by Masha Tupitsyn.

== Reception ==
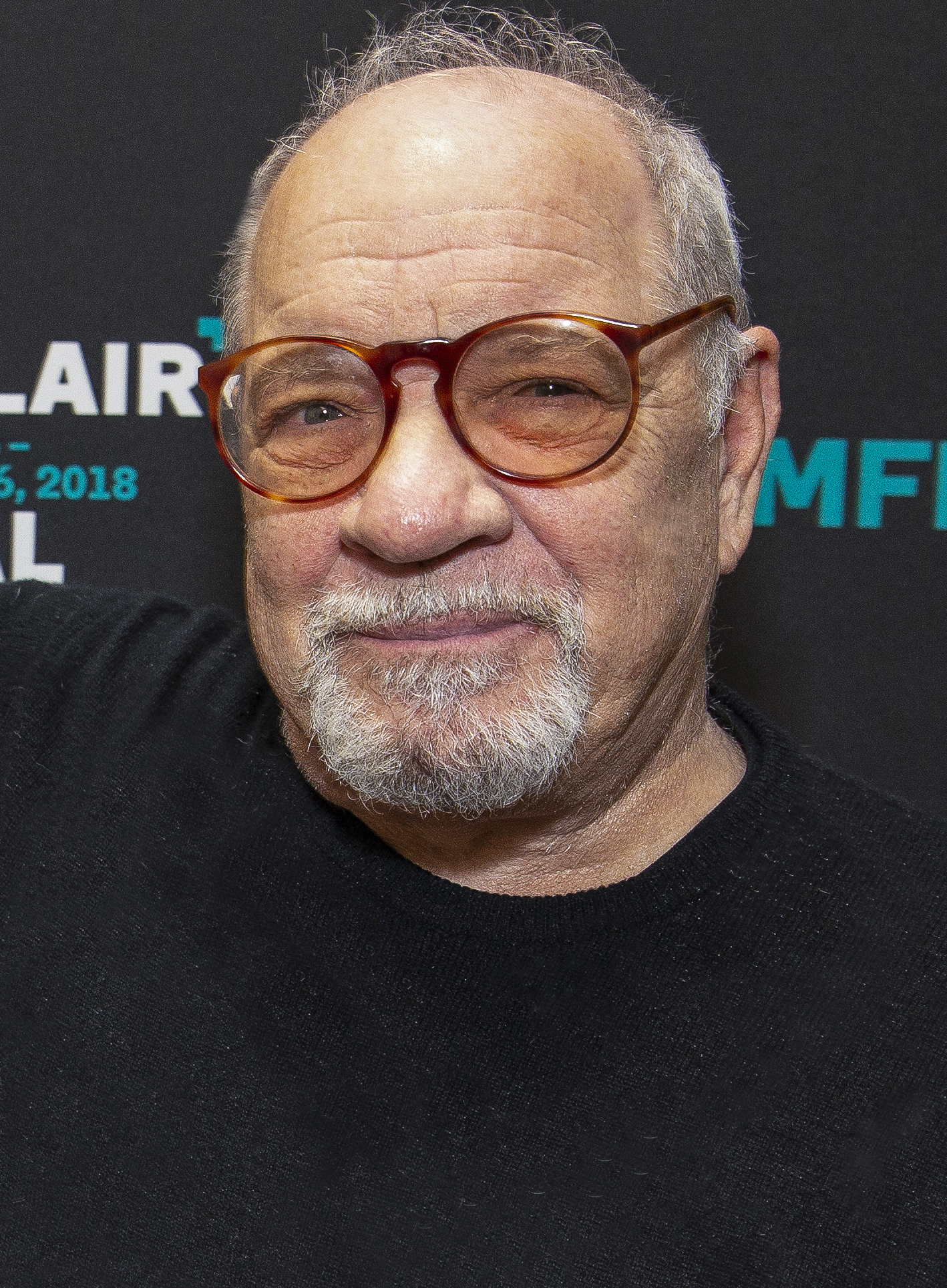
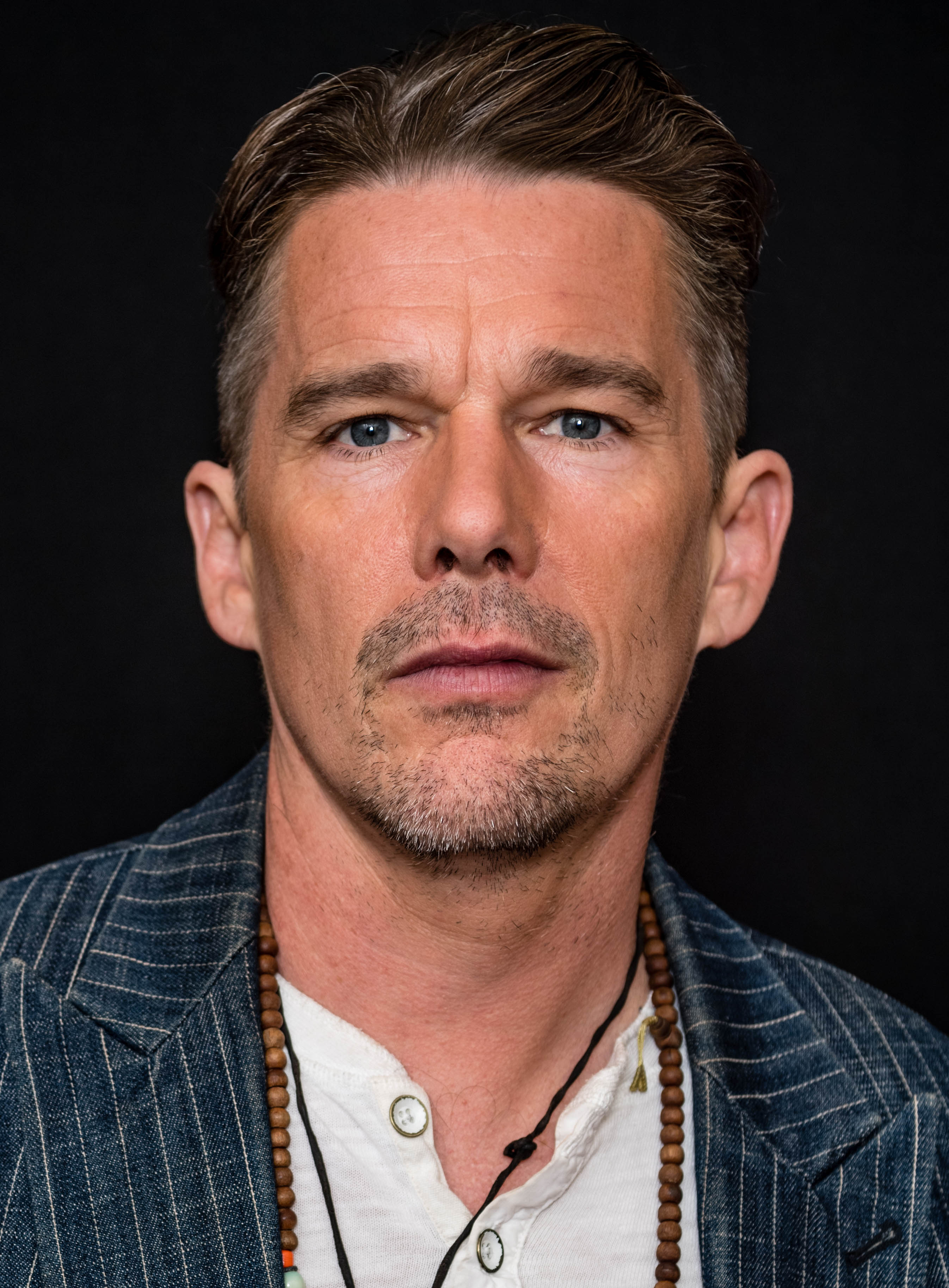
The screenplay and direction of Paul Schrader and the performance of Ethan Hawke garnered critical acclaim, with the former receiving his first Academy Award nomination for Best Original Screenplay.

=== Box office ===
Its opening weekend, the film made $100,270 from four theaters, averaging $25,067 per screen—one of the best per-screen averages of Schrader's career. By the end of its theatrical run, it had grossed $3,448,256 in the US and Canada and $540,356 in other territories, for a worldwide total of $3,988,612.

=== Critical response ===
On the review aggregator website Rotten Tomatoes, 94% of 254 critics' reviews are positive, with an average rating of 8.3/10. The website's consensus reads: "Brought to life by delicate work from writer-director Paul Schrader and elevated by a standout performance by Ethan Hawke, First Reformed takes a sensitive and suspenseful look at weighty themes." Metacritic, which uses a weighted average, assigned the film a score of 86 out of 100, based on 48 critics, indicating "universal acclaim".

A. O. Scott of The New York Times wrote: "First Reformed wrestles with contemporary reality, but it isn't a work of realism in the way that term is conventionally understood. The dialogue is delivered with formal, almost stiff cadences, and the images are crisp, graceful and plain." Justin Chang of the Los Angeles Times called the film "a cinephile's delight and a believer's conundrum, an austere American art film with a bracing B-movie soul, and a story in which the cruelest of cosmic punchlines may finally be no different from the most beautiful accession of grace." David L. Sims of The Atlantic called the film "a tale of existential woe [...] an embittered look at our world through the eyes of someone who's increasingly horrified to be a part of it, and a film that's one of the most searing cinema experiences of the year." Peter Bradshaw of The Guardian wrote "the sheer Bunyanesque severity of this film is as refreshing as a glass of ice-cold water" and called it "a passionately focused film but not a masterpiece", noting that the lead character's name is an allusion to the German playwright Ernst Toller. Michael Phillips of The Chicago Tribune wrote, "for such a deliberate exercise in a specific, methodical style, First Reformed is oddly bracing, full of unresolved, contradictory, vital ideas."

In July 2025, it was one of the films voted for the "Readers' Choice" edition of The New York Times's list of "The 100 Best Movies of the 21st Century", finishing at number 122. That same month, it ranked 39th on Rolling Stone's list of "The 100 Best Movies of the 21st Century".

=== Accolades ===
The film received nominations at the 34th Independent Spirit Awards for Best Film, Best Director, and Best Screenplay, and Hawke won Best Male Lead. At the 24th Critics' Choice Awards, the film was nominated for Best Actor and Best Original Screenplay, winning the latter. Schrader and Hawke won Best Screenplay and Best Actor, respectively, at the 28th Gotham Independent Film Awards. Both the National Board of Review and American Film Institute listed First Reformed as one of the Top 10 Films of 2018, and the National Board of Review also gave Schrader its award for Best Original Screenplay. Schrader's screenplay was also nominated for Best Original Screenplay at the 91st Academy Awards, the first Oscar nomination of his career.

== See also ==
- Monsey Church, a historic church in Rockland County, New York, founded in 1824 as True Reformed Dutch Church of West New Hempstead and renamed New Hope Christian Church in 2000
