= Green Book (film) =

2018 film by Peter Farrelly

- Theatrical release poster
- Directed by: Peter Farrelly
- Written by: Nick Vallelonga; Brian Hayes Currie; Peter Farrelly
- Produced by: Jim Burke; Brian Hayes Currie; Peter Farrelly; Nick Vallelonga; Charles B. Wessler
- Starring: Viggo Mortensen; Mahershala Ali; Linda Cardellini
- Cinematography: Sean Porter
- Edited by: Patrick J. Don Vito
- Music by: Kris Bowers
- Production companies: Participant Media; DreamWorks Pictures; Innisfree Pictures; Cinetic Media
- Distributed by: Universal Pictures
- Release dates: September 11, 2018 (TIFF); November 16, 2018 (United States)
- Running time: 130 minutes
- Country: United States
- Language: English
- Budget: $23 million
- Box office: $321.8 million

Green Book is a 2018 American comedy-drama film directed by Peter Farrelly. Starring Viggo Mortensen and Mahershala Ali, the biographical film is inspired by the true story of a 1962 tour of the Deep South by African-American pianist Don Shirley and Italian-American bouncer and later actor Frank "Tony Lip" Vallelonga, who served as Shirley's driver and bodyguard. Written by Farrelly alongside Lip's son Nick Vallelonga and Brian Hayes Currie, the film is based on interviews with Lip and Shirley, as well as letters Lip wrote to his wife. It is named after The Negro Motorist Green Book, a guide book for African-American travelers founded by Victor Hugo Green in 1936 and published until 1966.

Green Book had its world premiere at the Toronto International Film Festival on September 11, 2018, where it won the People's Choice Award. It was then theatrically released in the United States on November 16, 2018, by Universal Pictures, and grossed $321 million worldwide. The film received positive reviews from critics, with praise for the performances of Mortensen and Ali, although it also drew some criticism for its racial dynamics and its depiction of Shirley.

Green Book received many awards and nominations. It won the Academy Award for Best Picture, Best Original Screenplay, and Best Supporting Actor (for Ali), making it the fifth film to win Best Picture without being nominated for Best Director (after Wings, Grand Hotel, Driving Miss Daisy and Argo). It also won the Producers Guild of America Award for Best Theatrical Motion Picture, the Golden Globe Award for Best Motion Picture – Musical or Comedy, and the National Board of Review award for the best film of 2018, and was chosen as one of the top 10 films of the year by the American Film Institute. Ali also won the Golden Globe, Screen Actors Guild, and BAFTA Awards for Best Supporting Actor.

== Plot ==
In the autumn of 1962, in the Bronx, Italian-American bouncer Tony Lip searches for new employment while the Copacabana is closed for renovations. He is invited to an interview with Don Shirley, an African American pianist in need of a driver for his eight-week concert tour through the Midwest and Deep South.

Don hires Tony on the strength of his references. They embark with plans to return to New York City on Christmas Eve. Don's record label gives Tony a copy of The Negro Motorist Green Book, a guide for African American travelers that contains the addresses of those motels, restaurants, and filling stations that would serve them in the Jim Crow South.

Tony and Don clash as Tony feels uncomfortable being asked to act with more refinement, while haughty Don is displeased by Tony's uncouth habits. As the tour progresses, Tony is impressed with Don's talent on the piano and becomes increasingly appalled by the discriminatory treatment Don receives from his hosts and the general public when he is not on stage.

In Louisville, Kentucky, a group of white men beat Don and threaten him at gunpoint before Tony rescues him. He instructs Don not to go out without him for the rest of the tour.

Throughout the journey, Don helps Tony write eloquent letters to his wife, which deeply move her. Tony encourages Don to get in touch with his own estranged brother, but Don is hesitant, observing he has become isolated by his professional life and achievements. Don is later found in a homosexual encounter with a white man in a public shower, and Tony, unfazed, bribes the police officers at the scene to prevent his arrest.

In Mississippi, the two are arrested after police officers pull them over late at night in a sundown town, and Tony punches one after being insulted. While in jail, Don asks to phone his lawyer, but calls Attorney General Robert F. Kennedy, who pressures the governor and police to release them.

Once they resume traveling, Don reprimands Tony for his actions, and a heated argument erupts regarding race relations and meritocracy, with Don expressing frustration at feeling rejected by the black community due to his mannerisms while the white community either mistreats him or uses him to make themselves look open-minded. They eventually find a hotel for the night and reconcile.

On the night of Don's final performance in Birmingham, Alabama, he is refused entry into the whites-only dining room of the country club where he is due to perform. Tony threatens the manager, and Don refuses to play unless they serve him in the room with his audience. Eventually, Don gives Tony the choice on whether or not he plays, to smooth tensions. Tony chooses his friendship, refusing bribery from the manager, possibly terminating his contract with the record company that demands Don does not miss a show. Tony and Don leave the venue and instead eat at a black blues club, where Don joins the band on piano. As the pair leave the club, Tony senses and scares off two patrons with a firearm who were intending to ambush them for Don's money, which he had displayed earlier, an action which visibly startles Don.

The pair head north, attempting to get home by Christmas Eve, but are caught in a blizzard. They are then once again pulled over by a police officer. Worried they will receive the same treatment as earlier, both are surprised when it turns out the officer had only pulled them over due to a flat tire, which he kindly helps them fix. Continuing back to New York, Tony, for reasons of sleep deprivation, decides he is unable to continue driving, meaning he will miss Christmas dinner. Don, not wanting this to happen, drives for him, with Tony sleeping in the backseat.

Tony invites Don to have dinner with his family, but Don declines. At the party, a relative of Tony makes a racial remark, which Tony objects to, leading to the relative's acquiescence. Sitting alone at home, Don changes his mind and returns to Tony's, where he receives a warm welcome from Tony's extended family.

The end title cards show real-life photos of Don and Tony, explaining Don continued to tour and create music, while Tony went back working at the Copacabana, and they remained friends until dying months apart in 2013.

== Cast ==
- Viggo Mortensen as Tony "Lip" Vallelonga
- Mahershala Ali as Don Shirley
- Linda Cardellini as Dolores Venere, Tony's wife
- Sebastian Maniscalco as Johnny Venere, Dolores' brother
- Dimiter D. Marinov as Oleg Malacovich, Shirley's cellist
- Mike Hatton as George Dyer, Shirley's bassist
- Von Lewis as Bobby Rydell, Copa Singer
- Brian Stepanek as Graham Kindell, country club manager
- Joseph Cortese as Gio Loscudo
- Iqbal Theba as Amit, Don's assistant
- P. J. Byrne as Record Exec
- Tom Virtue as Morgan Anderson
- Don Stark as Jules Podell

In addition, Tony and Dolores Vallelonga's son, Frank Jr., appears as his own uncle, Rudy (Rodolfo) Vallelonga (who says, "I'm just saying, we're an arty family"), while their younger son (and the film's co-producer and co-screenwriter), Nick, appears as Augie, the Mafioso who offers Tony a job doing "things" while the Copacabana is under renovation. The real Rodolfo Vallelonga appears as his own father, Grandpa Nicola Vallelonga, while the real Louis Venere appears as his own father, Grandpa Anthony Venere. Another co-producer and co-screenwriter, Brian Currie, plays the Maryland State Trooper who helps out in the snow storm. Actor Daniel Greene, who frequently appears in films directed by the Farrelly brothers, portrays Macon Cop #1.

== Production ==
Viggo Mortensen began negotiations to star in the film in May 2017 and was required to gain 40–50 pounds (18–23 kg) for the role. Peter Farrelly was set to direct from a screenplay written by Nick Vallelonga (Tony Lip's son), Brian Currie, and himself.

On November 30, 2017, the lead cast was set with Mortensen, Mahershala Ali, Linda Cardellini and Iqbal Theba confirmed to star. Production began that week in New Orleans. Sebastian Maniscalco was announced as part of the cast in January 2018. Score composer Kris Bowers also taught Ali basic piano skills and was the stand-in when closeups of hands playing were required.

The film is executive produced by Jeff Skoll, Jonathan King, Octavia Spencer, Kwame L. Parker, John Sloss and Steven Farneth.

=== Writing ===
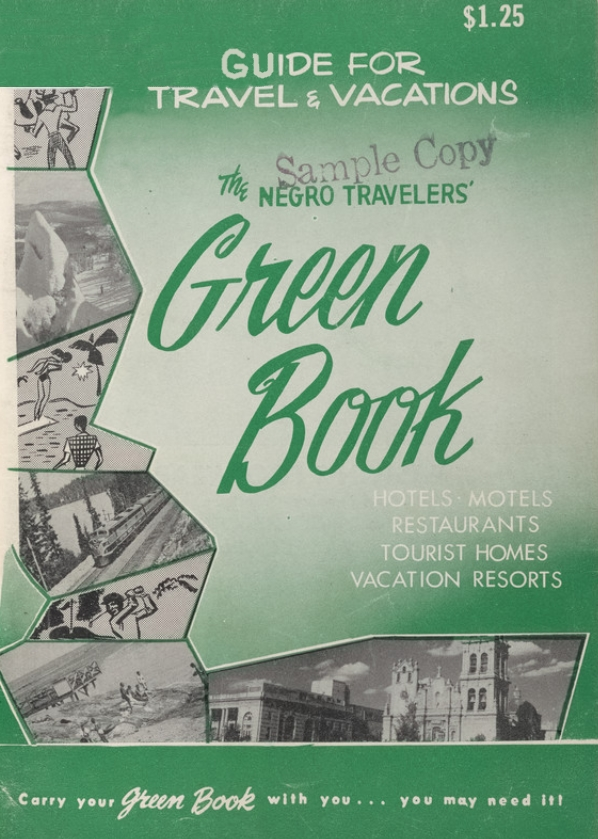
The Negro Motorist Green-Book listed businesses that served black travelers in the segregated South.

The script was written by Vallelonga's son Nick Vallelonga, as well as Brian Hayes Currie and Peter Farrelly, after conversations with his father and Shirley.

=== Music ===
For the film's soundtrack, Farrelly incorporated an original score by composer Kris Bowers and one of Shirley's own recordings. The soundtrack also includes rarities from 1950s and 1960s American music recommended to him by singer Robert Plant, who was dating a friend of Farrelly's wife at the time he had finished the film's script. During dinner on a double date, his wife and her friend stepped outside to smoke and the director asked Plant for advice on picking songs for the film that would be relatively unknown to contemporary audiences. This prompted Plant to play Farrelly songs via YouTube, including Sonny Boy Williamson II's "Pretty 'Lil Thing" and Robert Mosley's "Goodbye, My Lover, Goodbye".

In an interview with Forbes, the director explained the soundtrack ended up not only avoiding rote nostalgia, "but also those songs were really inexpensive and I did not have a huge budget so I was able to come up with some sensational pop songs from the time that were long forgotten." The music played at the black blues club toward the end of the film featured the piano performance of Étude Op. 25, No. 11 (Chopin), known as the Winter Wind etude by Chopin. This was not included in the soundtrack release.

A soundtrack album was released digitally on November 16, 2018, and physically on November 30, 2018, by Milan Records, featuring Bowers' score, songs from the plot's era, and a piano recording by Shirley. According to the label, it was streamed approximately 10,000 times per day during January 2019. This rate doubled the next month as the album surpassed one million streams worldwide and became the highest-streamed jazz soundtrack on the Milan label.

== Release ==
Originally in production at Focus Features, the company ultimately passed on the project. Participant Media then financed the $23 million budget for Green Book, but Farrelly was concerned about the fact that Participant had a distribution deal with Focus. Knowing very well about Steven Spielberg and his studio's longtime relationship with Universal Pictures, Farrelly decided to call his agent Richard Lovett, who also represents Spielberg. Lovett managed to convince Spielberg to watch the film, which he loved so much he reportedly watched it five times over two weeks, calling it "his favorite buddy movie since Butch Cassidy and the Sundance Kid". Spielberg then took the film to DreamWorks Pictures, which currently has a domestic distribution deal with Universal.

Green Book began a limited release in 20 cities, in the United States, on November 16, 2018, and expanded nationwide on November 21, 2018. The film was previously scheduled to begin its release on the 21st. The studio spent an estimated $37.5 million on prints and advertisements for the film.

The film had its world premiere at the Toronto International Film Festival on September 11, 2018. It also opened the 29th New Orleans Film Festival on October 17, 2018, screened at AFI Fest on November 9, 2018 and was programmed as the surprise film at the BFI London Film Festival.

On November 7, 2018, during a promotional panel discussion, Mortensen said the word "nigger". He prefaced the sentence with, "I don't like saying this word", and went on to compare dialogue "that's no longer common in conversation" to the period in which the film is set. Mortensen apologized the next day, saying "my intention was to speak strongly against racism" and he was "very sorry that I did use the full word last night, and will not utter it again".

=== Home media ===
Green Book was released on DVD and Blu-ray on March 12, 2019, by Universal Pictures Home Entertainment. The film was made available for purchase on streaming video in digital HD from Amazon Video and iTunes on February 19, 2019. It was also released on DVD and Blu-Ray by Entertainment One through 20th Century Fox Home Entertainment in the UK in 2018.

== Reception ==
=== Box office ===
Green Book grossed $85.1 million in the United States and Canada, and $236.7 million in other territories, for a total worldwide gross of $321.8 million, against a production budget of $23 million. Deadline Hollywood calculated the net profit of the film to be $106 million, when factoring together all expenses and revenues.

The film made $312,000 from 25 theaters in its opening weekend, an average of $12,480 per venue, which Deadline Hollywood called "not good at all", although TheWrap said it was a "successful start," and noted strong word-of-mouth would likely help it going into its wide release. The film had its wide expansion alongside the openings of Ralph Breaks the Internet, Robin Hood and Creed II, and was projected to gross around $7–9 million over the five-day weekend, November 21 to 25. It made $908,000 on its first day of wide release and $1 million on its second. It grossed $5.4 million over the three-day weekend (and $7.4 million over the five), finishing ninth. Deadline wrote the opening was "far from where [it needed] to be to be considered a success," and strong audience word of mouth and impending award nominations would be needed in order to help the film develop box office legs. Rival studios argued Universal went too wide too fast: from 25 theaters to 1,063 in less than a week.

In its second weekend the film made $3.9 million, falling just 29% and leading some industry insiders to think it would achieve $50 million during awards season. In its third weekend of wide release, following its Golden Globe nominations, it dropped 0% and again made $3.9 million, then made $2.8 million the following weekend. In its eighth weekend, the film made $1.8 million (continuing to hold well, dropping just 3% from the previous week). It then made $2.1 million in its ninth weekend (up 18%) and $2.1 million in its 10th. In the film's 11th week of release, following the announcement of its five Oscar nominations, it was added to 1,518 theaters (for a total of 2,430) and made $5.4 million, an increase of 150% from the previous weekend and finishing sixth at the box office. The weekend following its Best Picture win, the film was added to 1,388 theaters (for a total of 2,641) and made $4.7 million, finishing fifth at the box office. It marked a 121% increase from the previous week, as well as one of the best post-Best Picture win bumps ever, and largest since The King's Speech in 2011.

Green Book was a surprise success overseas, especially in China where it debuted to a much higher-than-expected $17.3 million, immediately becoming the second highest-grossing Best Picture winner in the country behind Titanic (1997). As of March 7, 2019, the largest international markets for the film were China ($26.7 million), France ($10.7 million), the United Kingdom ($10 million), Australia ($7.8 million) and Italy ($8.6 million). By March 13, China's total had grown to $44.5 million. On March 31 the film passed $300 million at the global box office, including $219 million from overseas territories. Its largest markets to-date were China ($70.7 million), Japan ($14.6 million), France ($14 million) Germany ($13.5 million) and the UK ($12.9 million).

=== Critical response ===
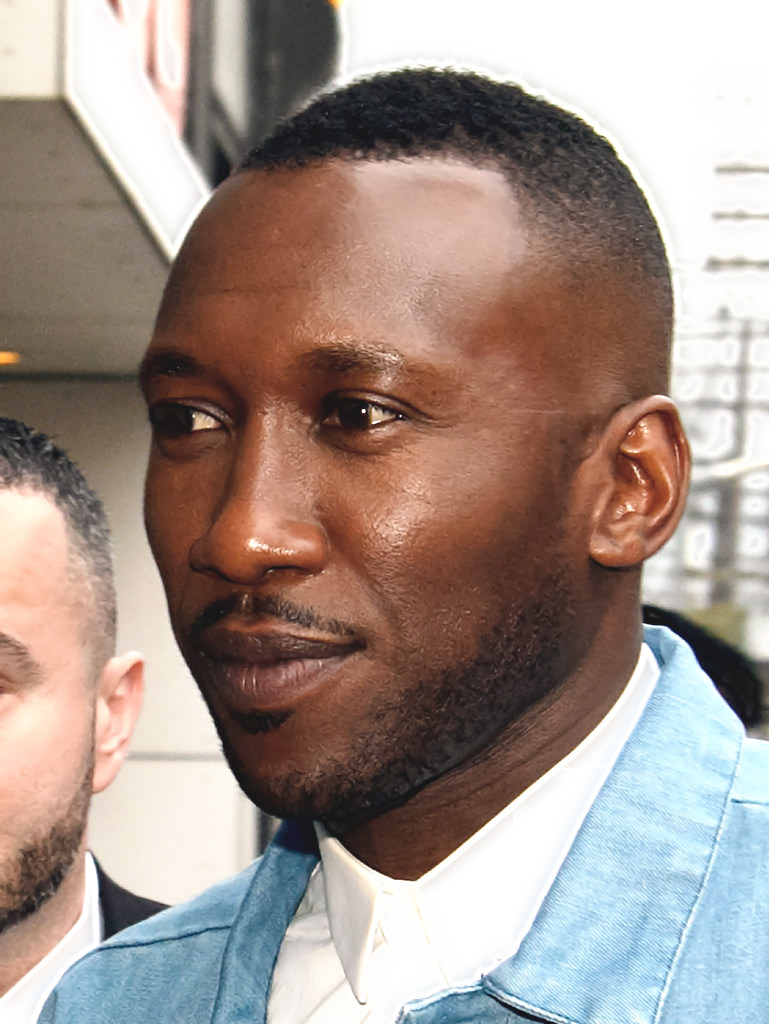
Mahershala Ali's performance as Don Shirley received positive reviews, earning him his second Academy Award for Best Supporting Actor.

On review aggregator Rotten Tomatoes, Green Book holds an approval rating of 77% based on 362 reviews, with an average rating of 7.2/10. The website's critical consensus reads: "Green Book takes audiences on an excessively smooth ride through bumpy subject matter, although Mahershala Ali and Viggo Mortensen's performances add necessary depth." On Metacritic the film has a weighted average score of 69 out of 100, based on 52 critics, indicating "generally favorable" reviews. Audiences polled by CinemaScore gave the film a rare average grade of "A+" on an A+ to F scale, while PostTrak reported filmgoers gave it a 91% positive score, with 80% saying they would definitely recommend it.

Writing for The San Francisco Chronicle, Mick LaSalle praised Ali and Mortensen and said: "...there's something so deeply right about this movie, so true to the time depicted and so welcome in this moment; so light in its touch, so properly respectful of its characters, and so big in its spirit, the movie acquires a glow. It achieves that glow slowly, but by the middle and certainly by the end, it's there, the sense of something magical happening, on screen and within the audience." Steve Pond of TheWrap wrote, "The movie gets darker as the journey goes further South, and as the myriad indignities and humiliations mount. But our investment in the characters rarely flags, thanks to Mortensen and Ali and a director who is interested in cleanly and efficiently delivering a story worth hearing."

Jazz artist Quincy Jones said to a crowd after a screening: "I had the pleasure of being acquainted with Don Shirley while I was working as an arranger in New York in the '50s, and he was without question one of America's greatest pianists ... as skilled a musician as Leonard Bernstein or Van Cliburn ... So it is wonderful that his story is finally being told and celebrated. Mahershala, you did an absolutely fantastic job playing him, and I think yours and Viggo's performances will go down as one of the great friendships captured on film."

Some critics thought Green Book perpetuated racial stereotyping by advancing the white savior narrative in film. Salon said the film combines "the white savior trope with the story of a bigot's redemption." Peter Farrelly told Entertainment Weekly that he was aware of the white savior trope before filming and sought to avoid it. He said he had long discussions with the actors and producers on the point, and believes it was not advanced by the film, saying it is "about two guys who were complete opposites and found a common ground, and it's not one guy saving the other. It's both saving each other and pulling each other into some place where they could bond and form a lifetime friendship."

New York Times writer Wesley Morris characterized the film as being a "racial reconciliation fantasy", arguing it represents a specific style of racial storytelling "in which the wheels of interracial friendship are greased by employment, in which prolonged exposure to the black half of the duo enhances the humanity of his white, frequently racist counterpart". Writing a positive review of the film in The Hollywood Reporter, Kareem Abdul-Jabbar noted "filmmakers are history's interpreters, not its chroniclers."

Filmmaker Spike Lee, whose BlacKkKlansman was also nominated for Best Picture at the 91st Academy Awards, expressed dissatisfaction with Green Book's win. Lee tried to exit the Dolby Theatre after the announcement of Green Book's victory, before turning his back on the acceptance speech that followed. Speaking to the press later that night, Lee compared the film to another Best Picture winner Driving Miss Daisy (1989), lamenting its Oscar success over his film Do the Right Thing (1989). He said "I thought I was courtside at the [Madison Square] Garden, and the ref made a bad call." Asked if the film had offended him, Lee told BBC reporters it "wasn't my cup of tea." He echoed the sentiment in a 2024 podcast, saying "no one's looking at Green Book now."

Green Book finished at number 264 in the 2025 "Readers' Choice" edition of The New York Times' list of "The 100 Best Movies of the 21st Century."

=== Criticism from Shirley's relatives ===
Shirley's relatives thought the film misrepresented the pianist's relationship with his family, and said they were not contacted by studio representatives until after development started. Shirley's brother, Maurice, said, "My brother never considered Tony to be his 'friend'; he was an employee, his chauffeur (who resented wearing a uniform and cap). This is why context and nuance are so important. The fact that a successful, well-to-do black artist would employ domestics that did NOT look like him, should not be lost in translation." However, in audio recordings from the 2010 documentary Lost Bohemia, Don Shirley said "I trusted him implicitly ... not only was he my driver. We never had an employer/employee relationship." The interviews also supported other events depicted in the film.

Writer-director Peter Farrelly said he was under the impression there "weren't a lot of family members" still alive, they did not take major liberties with the story, and relatives of whom he was aware had been invited to a private screening for friends and family. Tony Vallelonga's son, Nick – the film's co-writer – acknowledged he was sorry he had offended members of the Shirley family by not speaking to them. He told Variety: "Don Shirley himself told me not to speak to anyone" and Shirley "approved what I put in and didn't put in." According to Shirley's nephew Edwin Shirley III, actor Mahershala Ali called him to apologize, saying "I did the best I could with the material I had," and he was not aware there were "close relatives with whom I could have consulted to add some nuance to the character."

Shirley's cellist Jüri Täht was surprised to see a stage of his life depicted in a movie, and that he had been replaced by a fictionalised version of himself (the character of Oleg). He was dismayed that Oleg was made to be Russian in the film whereas Täht was an Estonian whose family had had to flee the USSR.

== Accolades ==
Green Book has received numerous award nominations. In addition to winning the People's Choice Award at the Toronto International Film Festival in September 2018, Green Book was nominated for five awards at the 91st Academy Awards, winning three awards for Best Picture, Best Original Screenplay and Best Supporting Actor for Mahershala Ali. Green Book was the fifth film to win Best Picture without a Best Director nomination (after Wings, Grand Hotel, Driving Miss Daisy and Argo). Green Book had five nominations at the 76th Golden Globe Awards, with the film winning Best Motion Picture – Musical or Comedy. The National Board of Review awarded it Best Film, and it was also recognized as one of the Top 10 films of the year by the American Film Institute.

== See also ==
- List of black films of the 2010s

== Bibliography ==
- Baltin, Steve (February 16, 2019). "Robert Plant's Friendly Role In 'Green Book' Soundtrack And Other Behind The Scenes Secrets". Forbes. An interview with director Peter Farrelly and composer Kris Bowers about the film's soundtrack.
