= Don Shirley =

American pianist and composer (1927–2013)

- Born: Donald Walbridge Shirley; January 29, 1927; Pensacola, Florida, U.S.
- Died: April 6, 2013 (aged 86); Manhattan, New York, U.S.
- Education: Prairie View A&M University; Virginia State University; Catholic University (BM); University of Chicago
- Occupations: Musician; composer
- Spouse: Jean C. Hill (m. 1952, divorced)
- Musical career
- Genres: Jazz; classical; chamber jazz
- Instruments: Piano; organ
- Years active: 1945–2013
- Labels: Cadence; Columbia; Atlantic

Donald Walbridge Shirley (January 29, 1927 – April 6, 2013) was an American pianist and composer. He recorded many albums for Cadence Records during the 1950s and 1960s, experimenting with setting popular and folk songs in a classical style. He wrote organ symphonies, piano concerti, a cello concerto, three string quartets, a one-act opera, works for organ, piano and violin, a symphonic poem based on the 1939 novel Finnegans Wake by James Joyce, and a set of "Variations" on the 1858 opera Orpheus in the Underworld.

Born in Pensacola, Florida, Shirley was a promising young student of classical piano. Although he did not achieve recognition in his early career playing traditional classical music, he found success with his blending of various musical traditions.

During the 1960s, Shirley went on a number of concert tours, some in Deep South states. For a time, he hired New York nightclub bouncer Tony "Lip" Vallelonga as his driver and bodyguard. Their story was dramatized in the 2018 film Green Book, in which he was played by Mahershala Ali.

== Early life ==
Shirley was born on January 29, 1927, in Pensacola, Florida, to Jamaican immigrants, Stella Gertrude (1903–1936), a teacher, and Edwin S. Shirley (1885–1982), an Episcopal priest. His birthplace was sometimes incorrectly given as Kingston, Jamaica, because his label advertised him as being Jamaican-born. Shirley started to learn piano when he was two years old. By age three, he was playing the organ.

He briefly enrolled at Virginia State University and Prairie View College, both historically black universities, then studied with Conrad Bernier and Thaddeus Jones at Catholic University of America in Washington, D.C., where he received his bachelor's degree in music in 1953. He was known as "Dr. Shirley" for his two honorary doctorates.

According to some sources, Shirley traveled to the Soviet Union to study piano and music theory at the Leningrad Conservatory of Music. According to cellist Jüri Täht, who performed with him, Shirley never studied in Leningrad or the Soviet Union. Shirley's nephew, Edwin, said his record label falsely claimed that he studied music in Europe to "make him acceptable in areas where a Black man from a Black school wouldn’t have got any recognition at all."

== Career ==
=== 1945–1953 ===
In 1945, at the age of 18, Shirley performed the Tchaikovsky B-flat minor concerto with the Boston Symphony Orchestra. A year later, Shirley performed one of his compositions with the London Philharmonic Orchestra.

While a student at the Catholic University of America, Shirley was a finalist for the prestigious Rhodes Scholarship in 1949, though he was not selected. Had he been selected, Shirley indicated that he would study "oriental languages" at Oxford rather than music.

In 1949, he received an invitation from the Haitian government to play at the Exposition Internationale du Bi-Centenaire de Port-au-Prince, followed by a request from President Estimé and Archbishop Joseph-Marie Le Gouaze for a repeat performance the next week.

Shirley was married to Jean C. Hill in Cook County, Illinois on December 23, 1952, but they later divorced.

Discouraged by the lack of opportunities for black classical musicians, Shirley abandoned the piano as a career for a time. He studied psychology at the University of Chicago and began work in Chicago as a psychologist. There he returned to music. He was given a grant to study the relationship between music and juvenile crime, which had broken out in the postwar era of the early 1950s. While playing in a small club, he experimented with sound to determine how the audience responded. The audience was unaware of his experiments and that students had been planted to gauge their reactions.

=== 1954–2013 ===
At Arthur Fiedler's invitation, Shirley appeared with the Boston Pops in Chicago in June 1954. In 1955, he performed with the NBC Symphony at the premiere of Duke Ellington's Piano Concerto at Carnegie Hall. He also appeared on TV on Arthur Godfrey and His Friends.

Shirley's first album as a leader was Tonal Expressions, for Cadence Records. It reached No. 14 on Billboard's Best-Selling Pop Albums chart in 1955. During the 1950s and 1960s, he recorded many albums for Cadence, experimenting with jazz with a classical influence. In 1961, his single "Water Boy" reached No. 40 on the Billboard Hot 100 and stayed on the chart for 14 weeks. He performed in New York City at Basin Street East, where Duke Ellington heard him and they started a friendship.

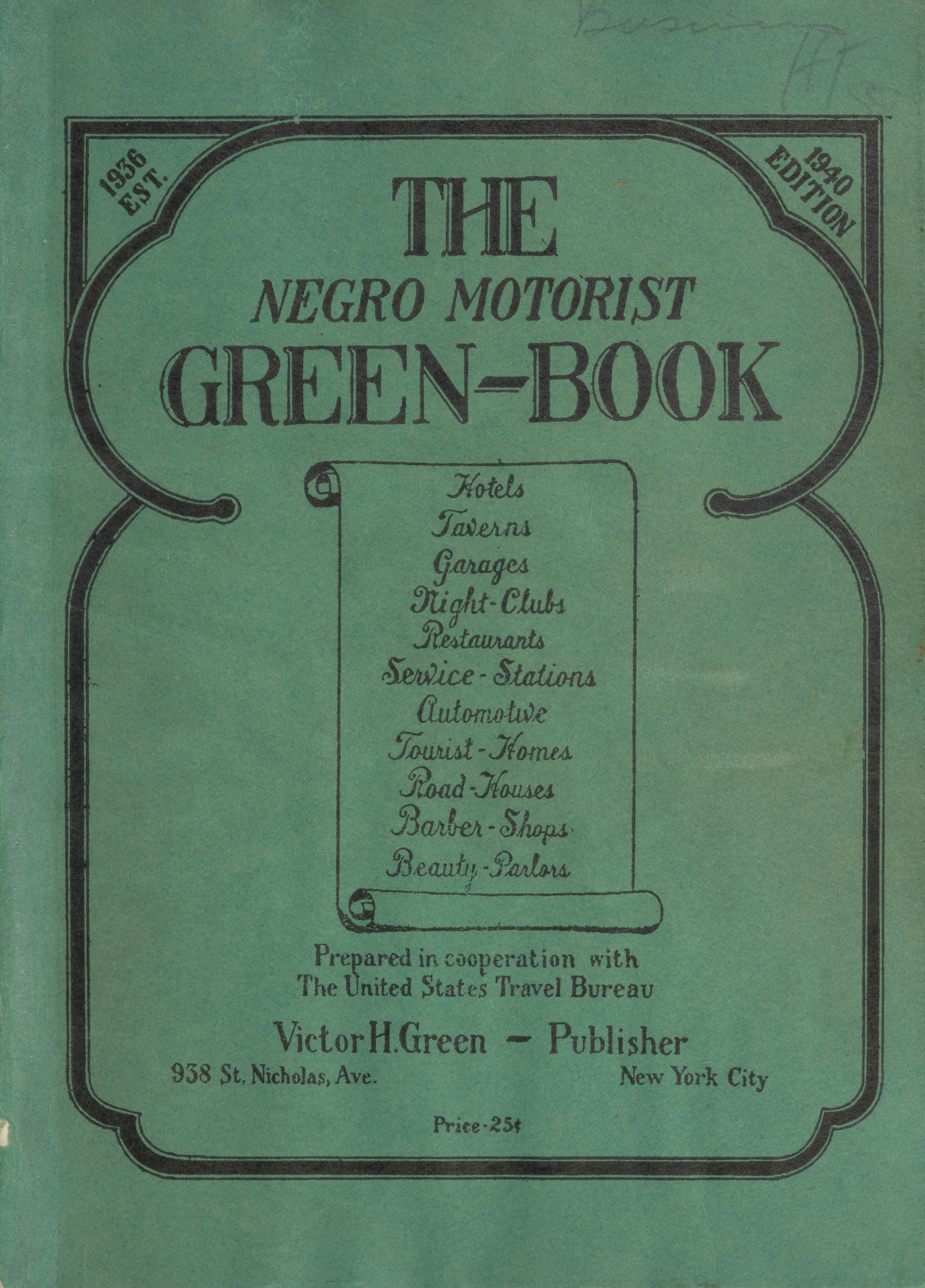
The Negro Motorist Green Book is featured in the film Green Book, which was inspired by Shirley's tour in the Deep South in 1962.

During the 1960s, Shirley went on a number of concert tours, some in Southern states, believing that he could change some minds with his performances. For his initial tour, in 1962, he hired New York nightclub bouncer Tony "Lip" Vallelonga as his driver and bodyguard. Their story is dramatized in the 2018 film Green Book, the name of a travel guide for black motorists in the segregated United States. While the film depicts Shirley as estranged from his family and alienated from other African Americans, Shirley's surviving family members dispute this. They say he was involved in the Civil Rights Movement, attended the 1965 Selma to Montgomery march, and knew other African American artists and leaders. He also had three brothers with whom, according to his family, he kept in touch. Author David Hajdu, who met and befriended Shirley in the 1990s through composer Luther Henderson, wrote: "the man I knew was considerably different from the character Ali portrayed with meticulous elegance in Green Book. Cerebral but disarmingly earthy, mercurial, self-protective, and intolerant of imperfections in all things, particularly music, he was as complex and uncategorizable as his sui generis music."

In late 1968, Shirley performed the Tchaikovsky 1st Piano Concerto with the Detroit Symphony. He also worked with the Chicago Symphony and the National Symphony Orchestra. He wrote symphonies for the New York Philharmonic and Philadelphia Orchestra. He played as soloist with the orchestra at Milan's La Scala opera house in a program dedicated to George Gershwin's music. Igor Stravinsky, who was an admirer of Shirley, said of him, "His virtuosity is worthy of Gods."

== Death ==
Shirley died of heart disease on April 6, 2013, at the age of 86.

== Discography ==
- Tonal Expressions (Cadence, 1955)
- Orpheus in the Underworld (Cadence, 1956)
- Piano Perspectives (Cadence, 1956)
- Don Shirley Duo (Cadence, 1956)
- Don Shirley with Two Basses (Cadence, 1957)
- Don Shirley Solos (Cadence, 1957)
- Improvisations (Cadence, 1957)
- Don Shirley (Audio Fidelity, 1959)
- Don Shirley Plays Love Songs (Cadence, 1960)
- Don Shirley Plays Gershwin (Cadence, 1960)
- Don Shirley Plays Standards (Cadence, 1960)
- Don Shirley Plays Birdland Lullabies (Cadence, 1960)
- Don Shirley Plays Showtunes (Cadence, 1960)
- Don Shirley Trio (Cadence, 1961)
- Piano Arrangements of Spirituals (Cadence, 1962)
- Pianist Extraordinary (Cadence, 1962)
- Piano Spirituals (1962)
- Don Shirley Presents Martha Flowers (1962)
- Drown in My Own Tears (Cadence, 1962)
- Water Boy (Columbia, 1965)
- The Gospel According to Don Shirley (Columbia, 1969)
- Don Shirley in Concert (Columbia, 1969)
- The Don Shirley Point of View (Atlantic, 1972)
- Home with Donald Shirley (2001)
- Don Shirley's Best (Cadence, 2010)

== Bibliography ==
- Feather, L. G. (1960). The New Edition of the Encyclopedia of Jazz. Horizon Press. pp. 418–419.
- Fox, A. (2007). Compendium of Over 2000 Jazz Pianists. Trofford Publishing. p. 138. ISBN 978-1-4251-1848-8.
- Neely, T., ed. (2001). Goldmine Record Album Price Guide (2nd ed.). Krause Publications. pp. 507–508. ISBN 0-87349-316-8.
- Neely, T., ed. (2003). Goldmine Record Album Price Guide (3rd ed.). Krause Publications. p. 545. ISBN 0-87349-671-X.
- Whitburn, J. (1991). The Billboard Book of Top 40 Albums. Billboard Books. p. 328. ISBN 0-8230-7534-6.
