= 91st Academy Awards =

- Official poster
- Date: February 24, 2019
- Site: Dolby Theatre; Hollywood, Los Angeles, California, U.S.
- Preshow hosts: Ashley Graham; Maria Menounos; Billy Porter; Ryan Seacrest; Elaine Welteroth
- Produced by: Donna Gigliotti; Glenn Weiss
- Directed by: Glenn Weiss

Highlights
- Best Picture: Green Book
- Most awards: Bohemian Rhapsody (4)
- Most nominations: The Favourite and Roma (10)

TV in the United States
- Network: ABC
- Duration: 3 hours, 21 minutes
- Ratings: 29.56 million 16.4% (Nielsen ratings)

The 91st Academy Awards ceremony, presented by the Academy of Motion Picture Arts and Sciences (AMPAS), honored the best films of 2018 and took place on February 24, 2019, at the Dolby Theatre in Hollywood, Los Angeles. During the ceremony, AMPAS presented Academy Awards (commonly referred to as Oscars) in 24 categories. The ceremony was televised in the United States by the American Broadcasting Company (ABC) and was produced by Donna Gigliotti and Glenn Weiss, with Weiss also serving as director. This was the first telecast to have no host since the 61st ceremony held in 1989.

In related events, the Academy held its 10th Annual Governors Awards ceremony at the Grand Ballroom of the Hollywood & Highland Center on November 18, 2018. The Academy Scientific and Technical Awards were presented by host David Oyelowo on February 9, 2019, in a ceremony at the Beverly Wilshire Hotel in Beverly Hills.

Green Book won three awards, including Best Picture. Bohemian Rhapsody won the most awards of the night, with four awards. Black Panther and Roma won three awards, and Bao, BlacKkKlansman, The Favourite, First Man, Free Solo, If Beale Street Could Talk, Period. End of Sentence., Skin, Spider-Man: Into the Spider-Verse, A Star Is Born, and Vice each won one. The telecast garnered 29.56 million viewers in the United States.

== Winners and nominees ==
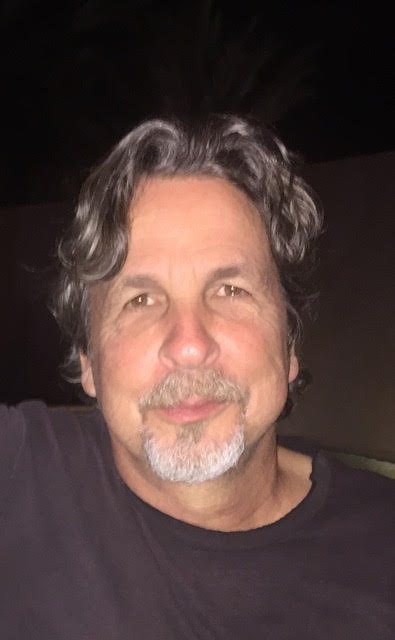
Peter Farrelly, Best Picture and Best Original Screenplay co-winner

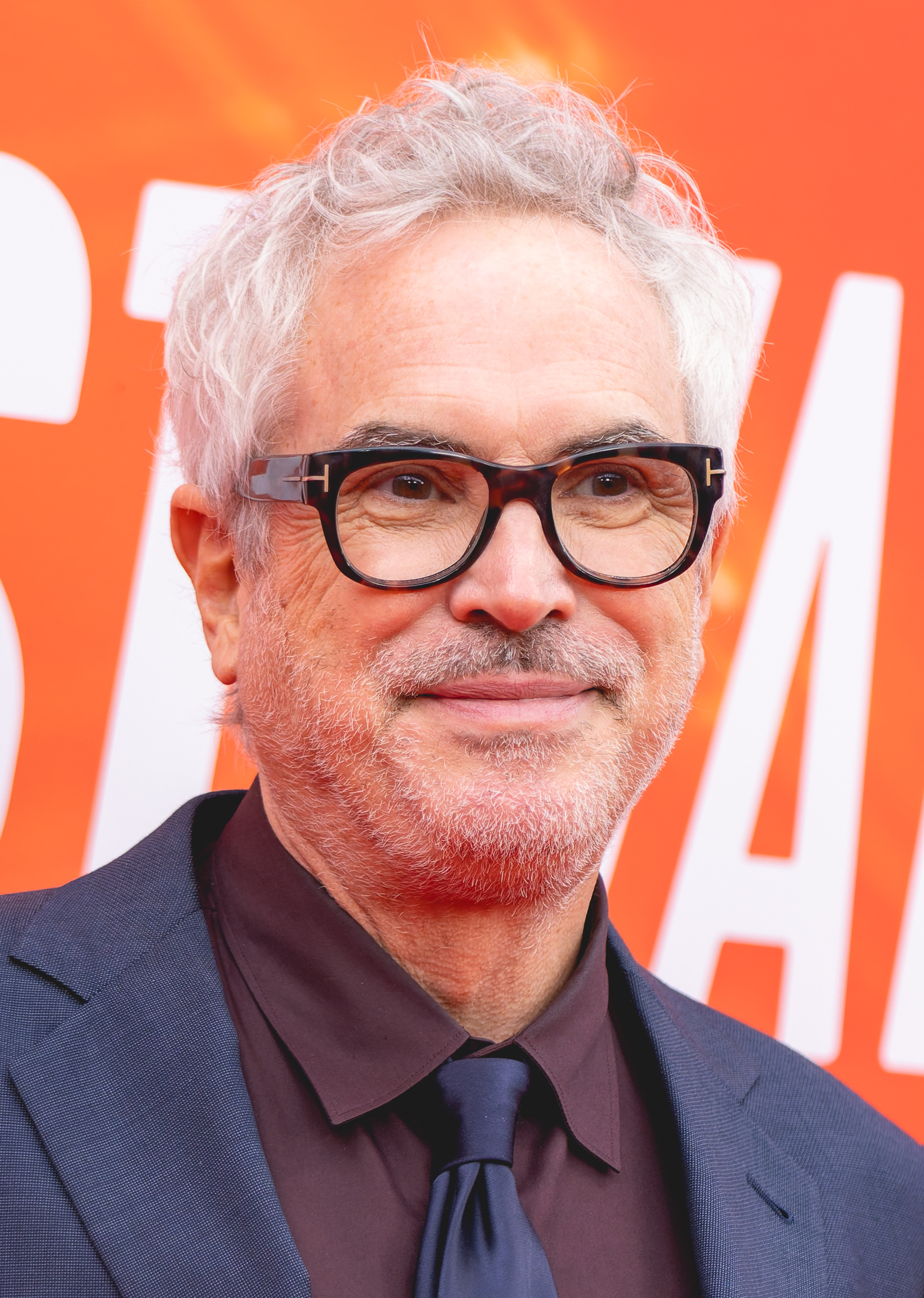
Alfonso Cuarón, Best Director, Best Foreign Language Film, and Best Cinematography winner

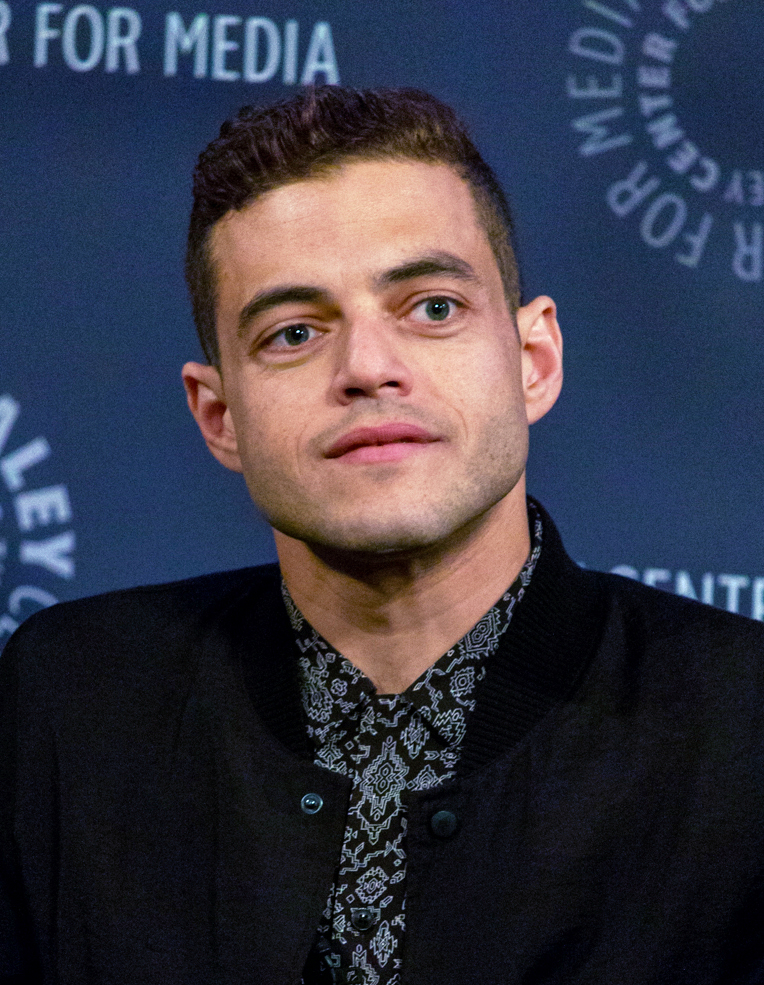
Rami Malek, Best Actor winner

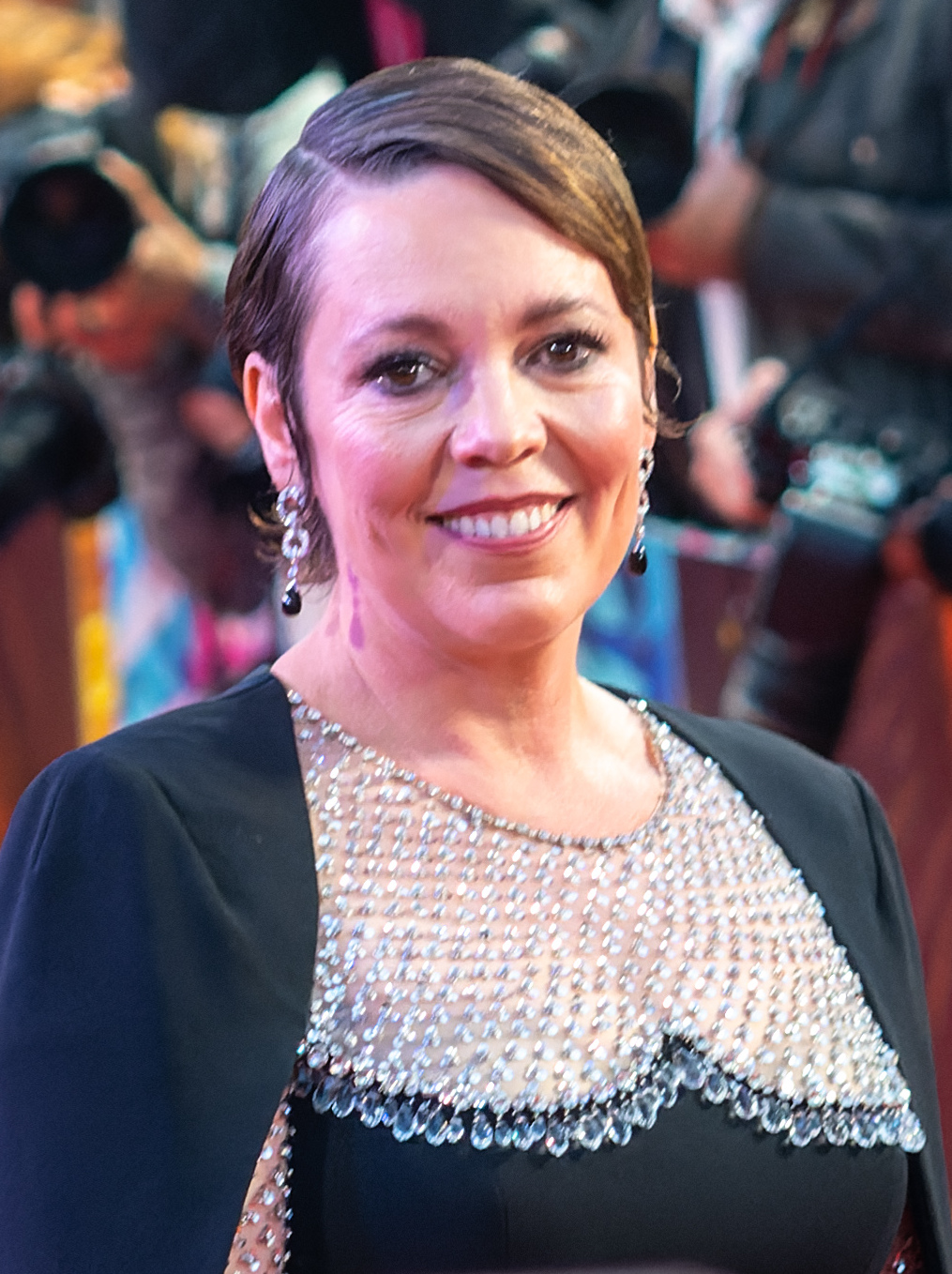
Olivia Colman, Best Actress winner

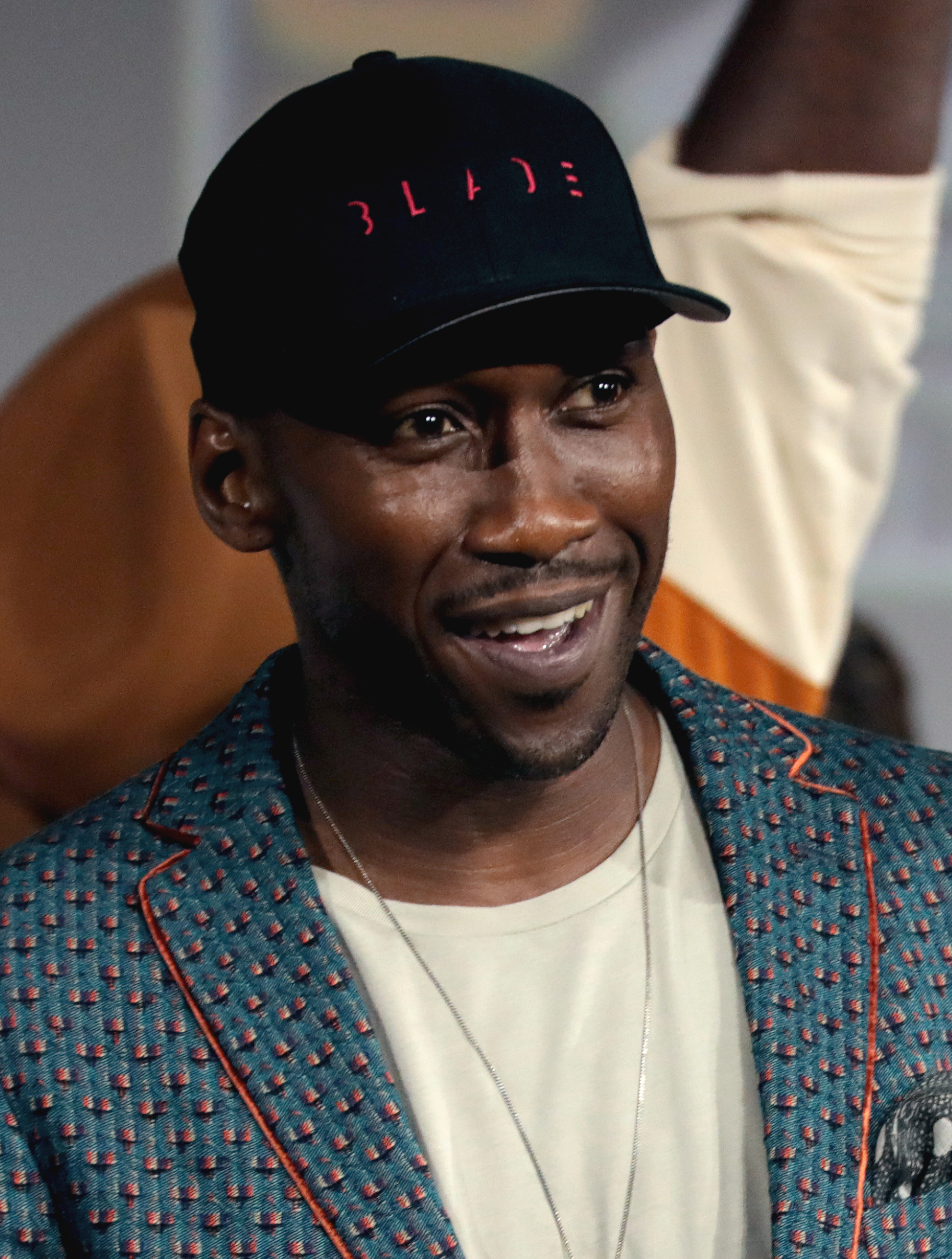
Mahershala Ali, Best Supporting Actor winner

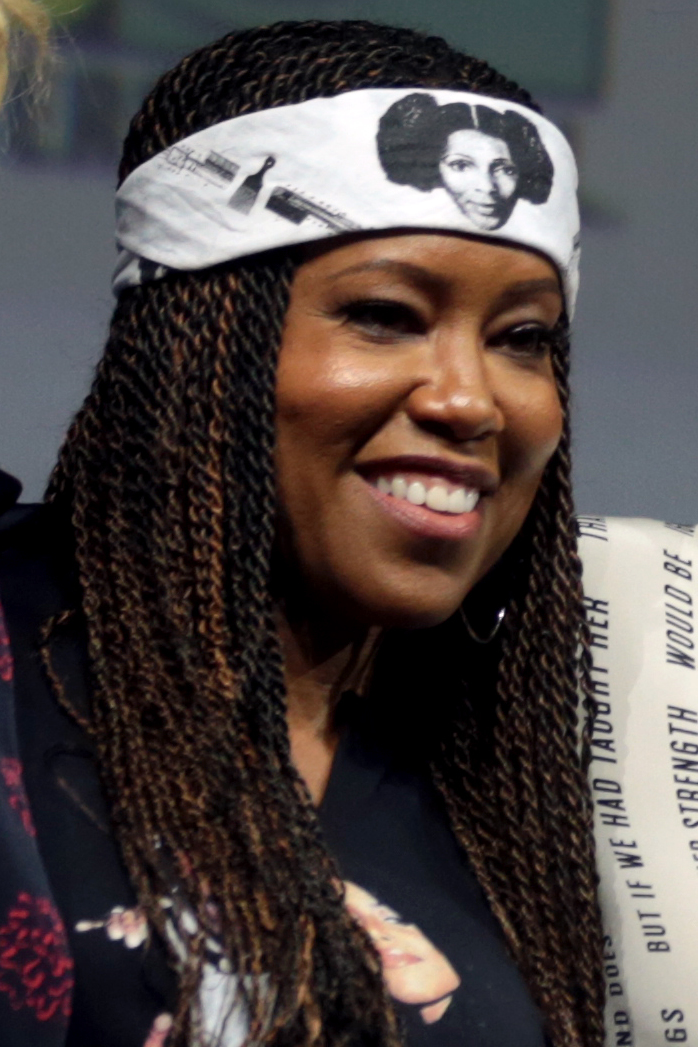
Regina King, Best Supporting Actress winner

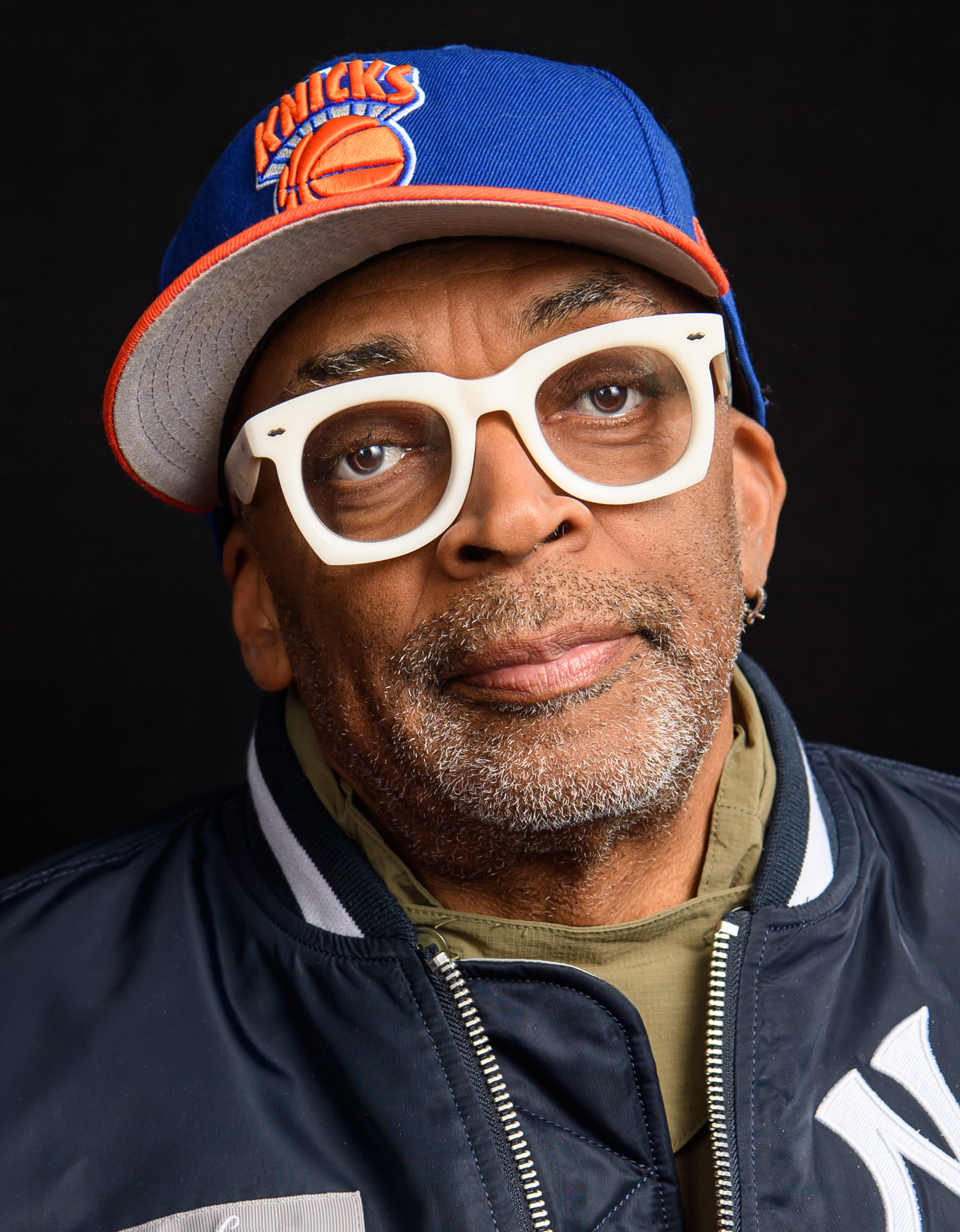
Spike Lee, Best Adapted Screenplay co-winner

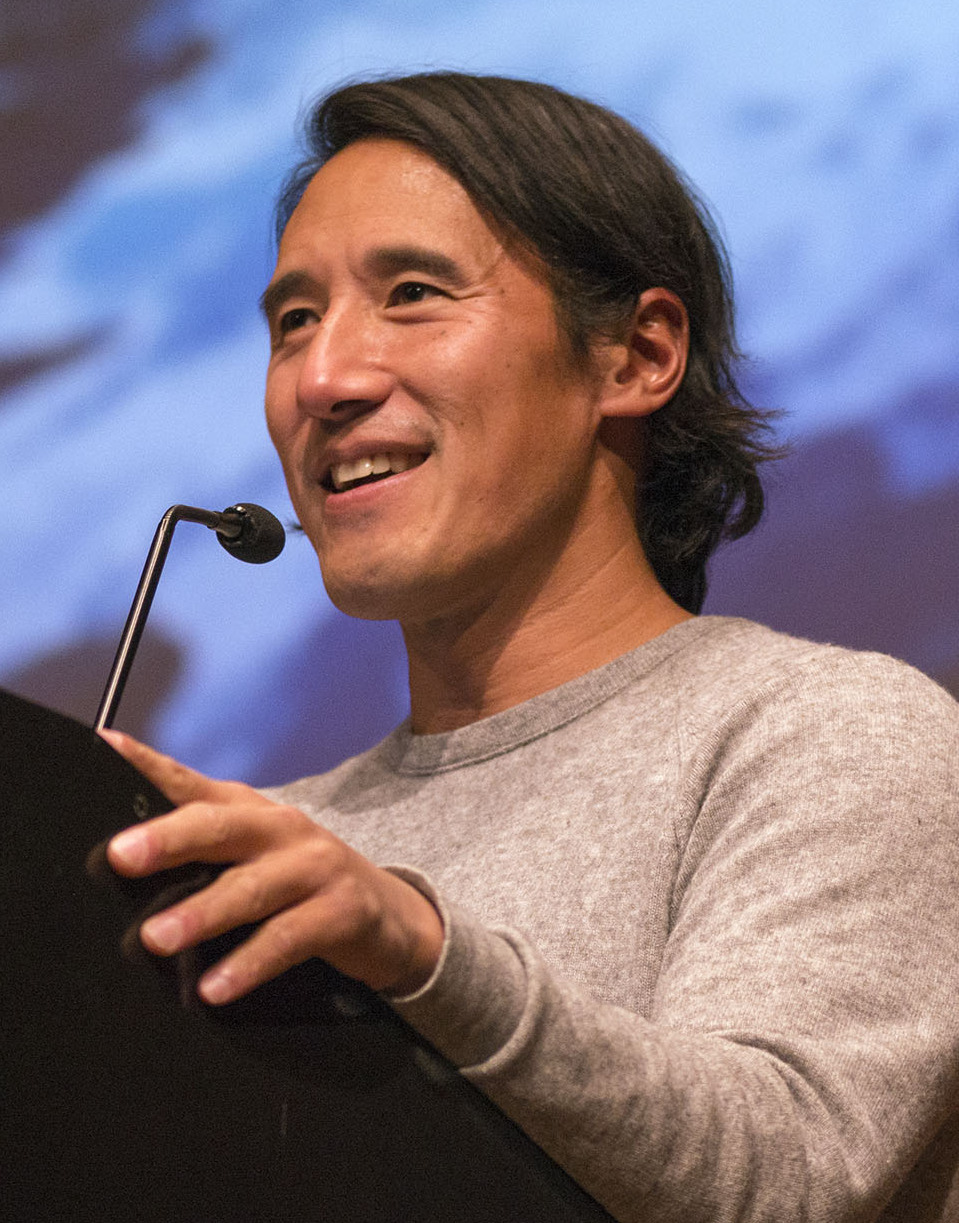
Jimmy Chin, Best Documentary Feature co-winner

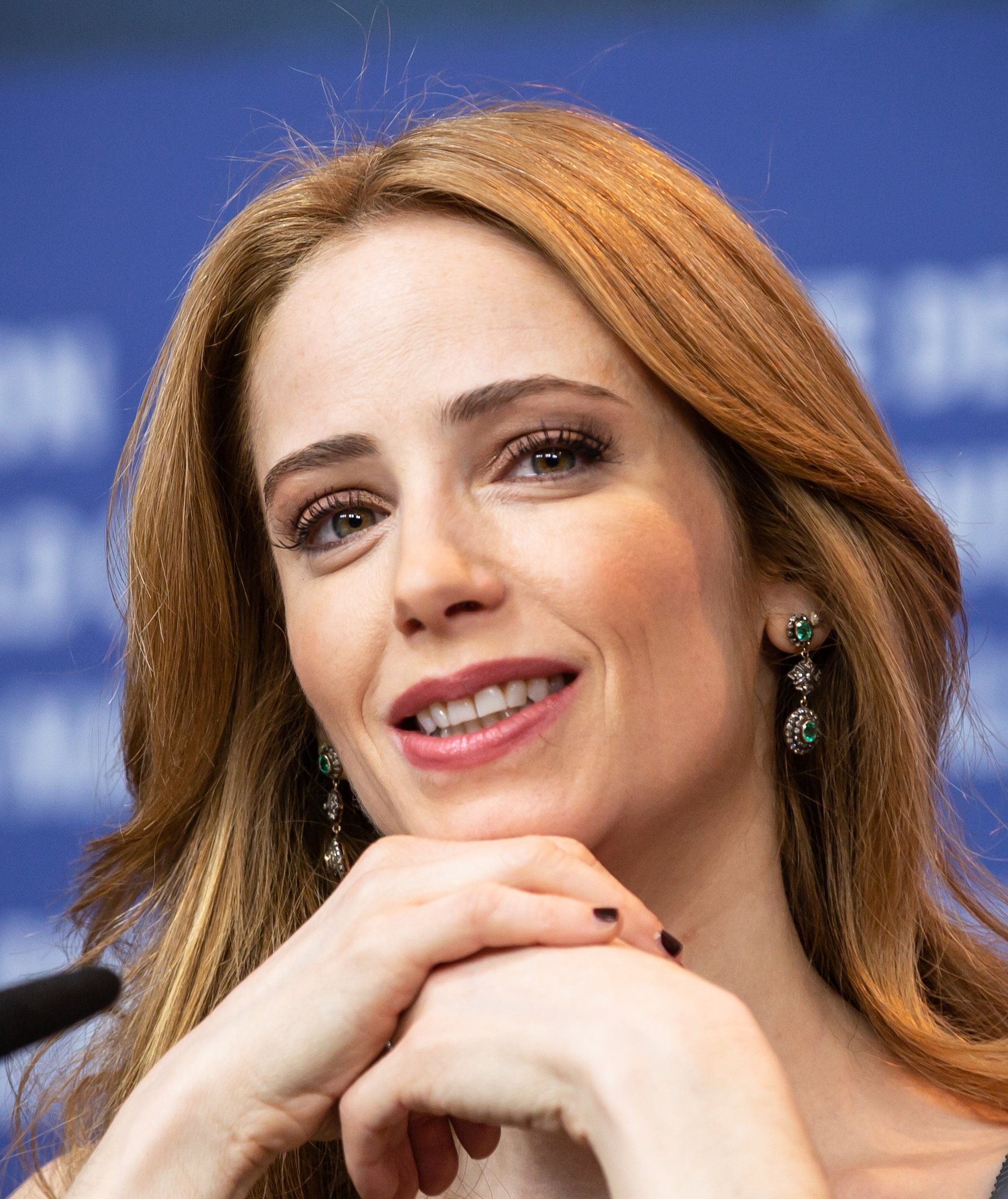
Jaime Ray Newman, Best Live Action Short Film co-winner

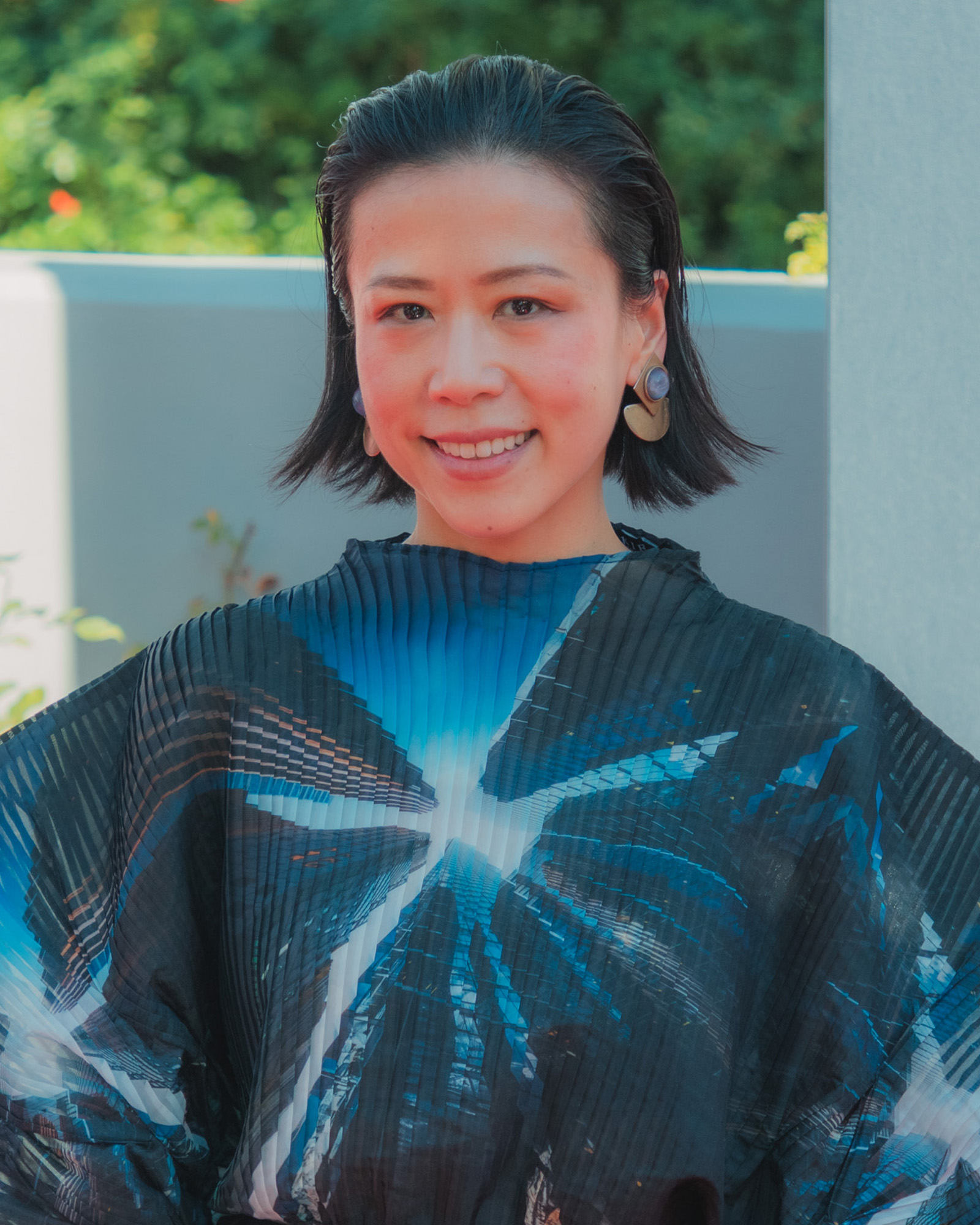
Domee Shi, Best Animated Short Film co-winner

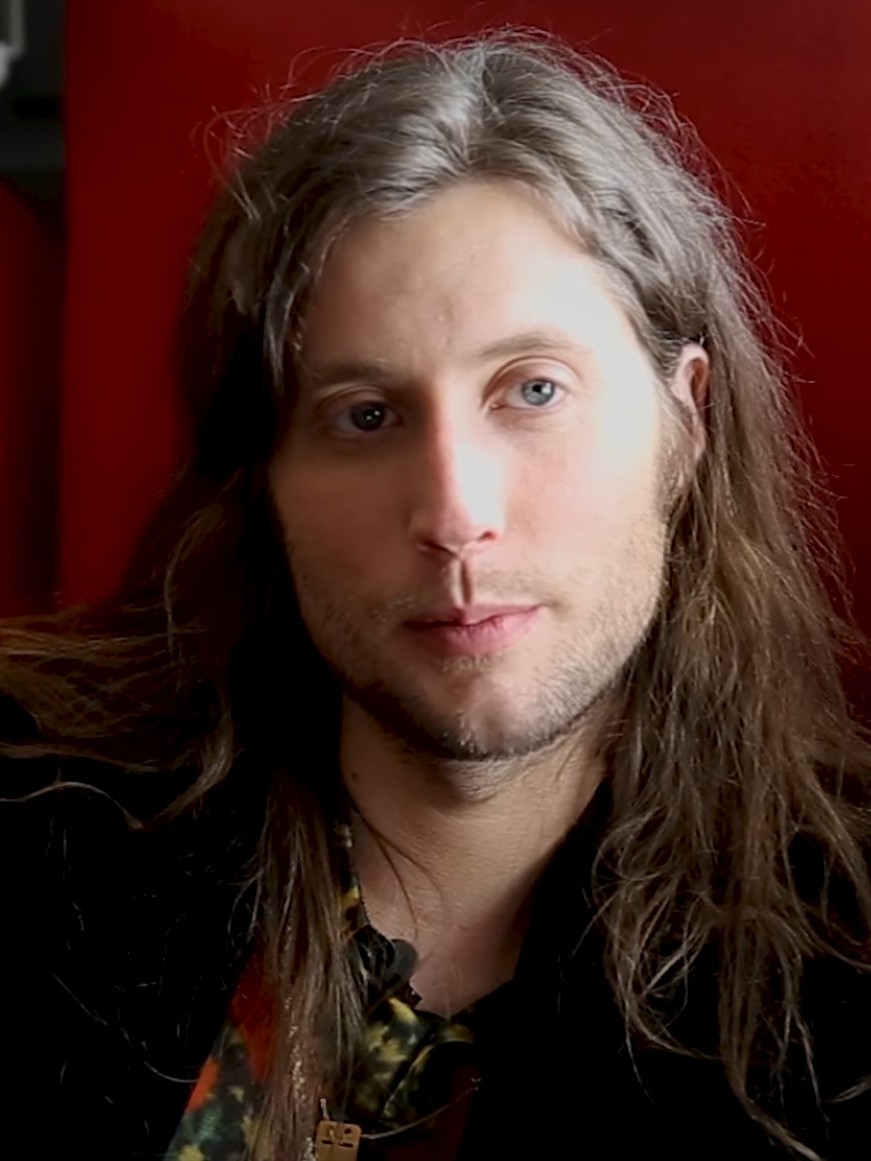
Ludwig Göransson, Best Original Score winner

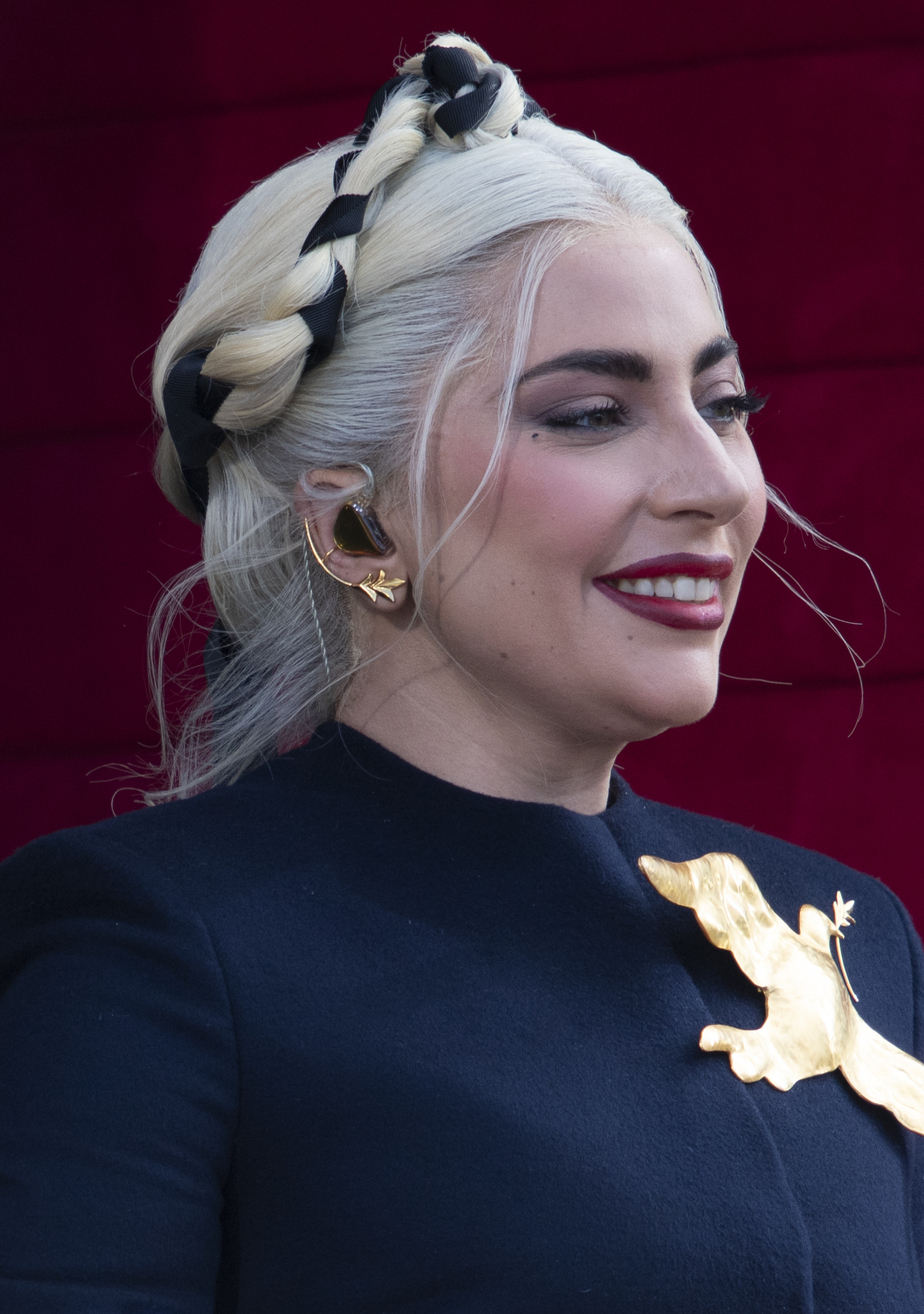
Lady Gaga, Best Original Song co-winner

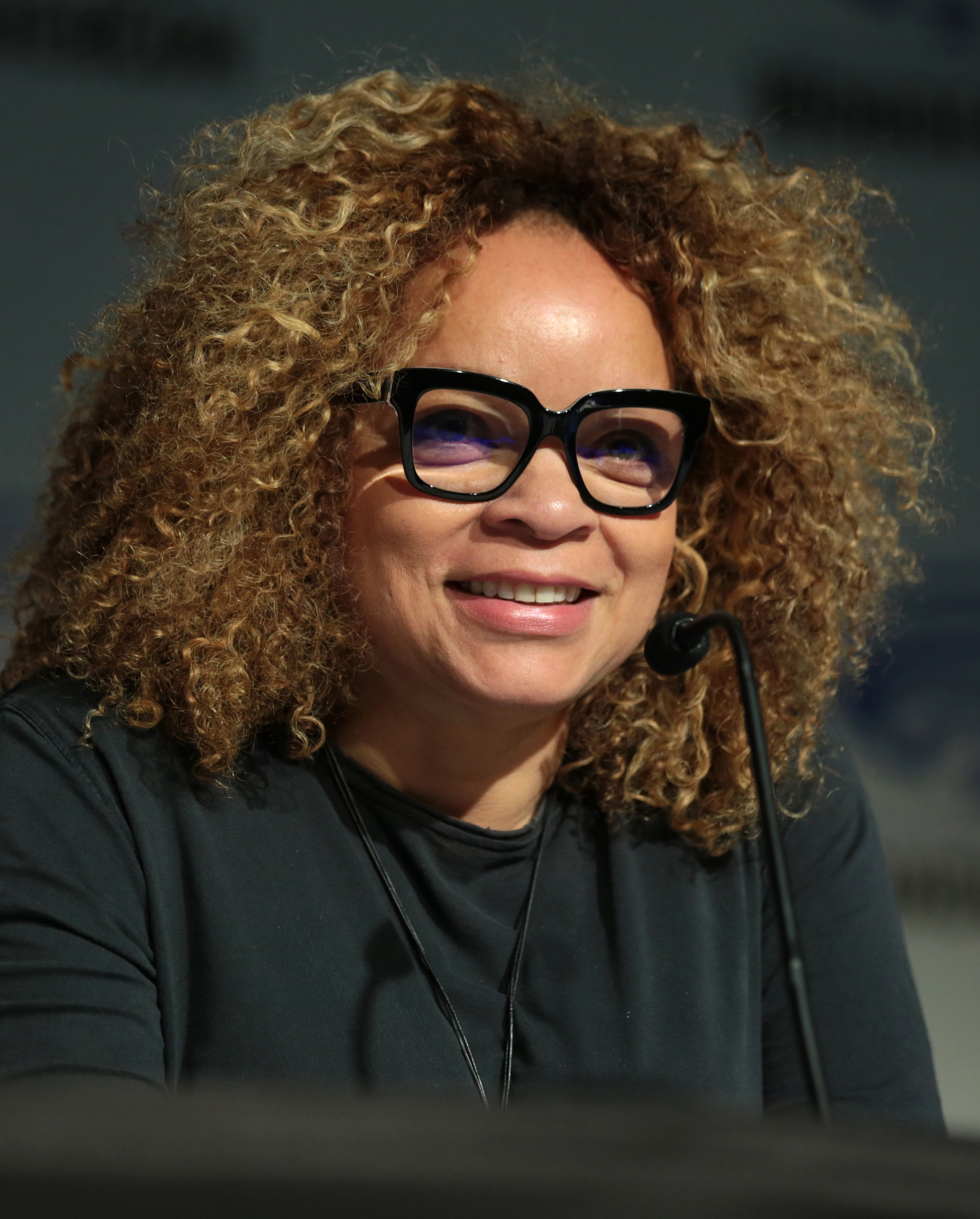
Ruth E. Carter, Best Costume Design winner

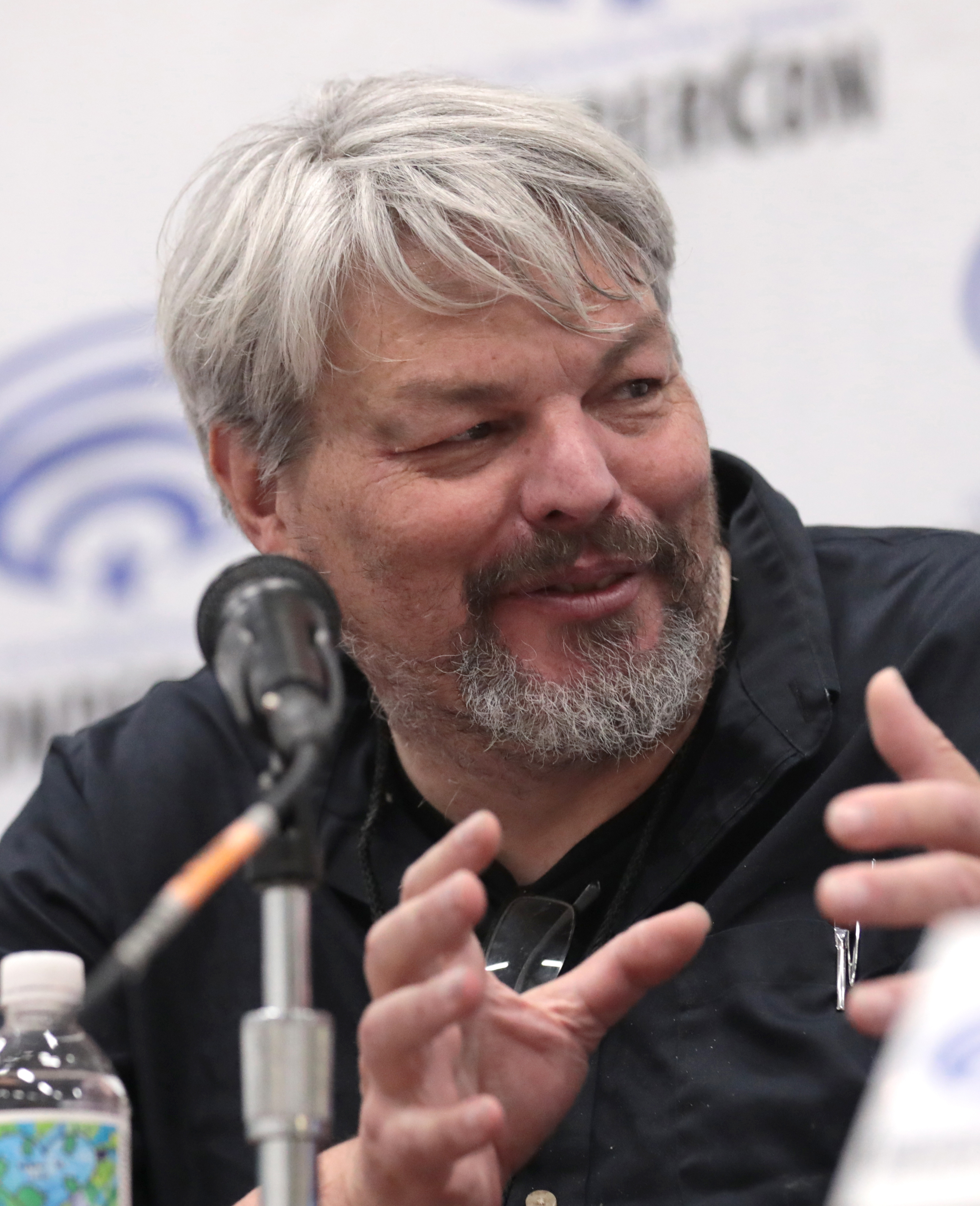
Ian Hunter, Best Visual Effects co-winner

The nominees for the 91st Academy Awards were announced on January 22, 2019, at 5:20 a.m. PST (13:20 UTC), at the Academy headquarters in Beverly Hills, by actors Kumail Nanjiani and Tracee Ellis Ross. The Favourite and Roma tied for the most nominations with ten each.

The winners were announced during the awards ceremony on February 24, 2019. For the second time since the expansion of the Best Picture nominee roster at the 82nd ceremony in 2010, every Best Picture nominee won at least one award. Roma became the fifth film nominated simultaneously for Best Picture and Best Foreign Language Film in the same year. Alfonso Cuarón was the first person to win Best Director and Best Cinematography for the same film. Black Panther was the first superhero film to be nominated for Best Picture.

Best Actress nominee Yalitza Aparicio was the first Indigenous Mexican person nominated for an acting Oscar. Best Supporting Actor winner Mahershala Ali became the second black performer to win multiple acting awards after Denzel Washington, who won Best Supporting Actor for 1989's Glory and Best Actor for 2001's Training Day. With her nomination for Best Actress and win for Best Original Song for co-writing "Shallow" from A Star Is Born, Lady Gaga was the second person to receive acting and songwriting nominations for the same film, after Mary J. Blige for 2017's Mudbound, and the first person to do so in a leading role and win in either or both categories. Hannah Beachler became the first black Best Production Design nominee. Both her and Best Costume Design winner Ruth E. Carter were the first black winners in their respective categories, as well as the first black women to win in a non-acting category since Irene Cara, who won the category of Best Original Song for co-writing "Flashdance... What a Feeling" from 1983's Flashdance.

=== Awards ===
Winners are listed first, highlighted in boldface, and indicated with a double dagger (‡).

**Best Picture**: **Green Book – Jim Burke, Charles B. Wessler, Brian Currie, Peter Farrelly and Nick Vallelonga**‡; Black Panther – Kevin Feige; BlacKkKlansman – Sean McKittrick, Jason Blum, Raymond Mansfield, Jordan Peele and Spike Lee; Bohemian Rhapsody – Graham King; The Favourite – Ceci Dempsey, Ed Guiney, Lee Magiday and Yorgos Lanthimos; Roma – Gabriela Rodríguez and Alfonso Cuarón; A Star Is Born – Bill Gerber, Bradley Cooper and Lynette Howell Taylor; Vice – Dede Gardner, Jeremy Kleiner, Adam McKay and Kevin Messick	**Best Directing**: **Alfonso Cuarón – Roma**‡; Spike Lee – BlacKkKlansman; Paweł Pawlikowski – Cold War; Yorgos Lanthimos – The Favourite; Adam McKay – Vice
**Best Actor in a Leading Role**: **Rami Malek – Bohemian Rhapsody as Freddie Mercury**‡; Christian Bale – Vice as Dick Cheney; Bradley Cooper – A Star Is Born as Jackson "Jack" Maine; Willem Dafoe – At Eternity's Gate as Vincent van Gogh; Viggo Mortensen – Green Book as Tony Vallelonga	**Best Actress in a Leading Role**: **Olivia Colman – The Favourite as Queen Anne**‡; Yalitza Aparicio – Roma as Cleodegaria "Cleo" Gutierrez; Glenn Close – The Wife as Joan Castleman; Lady Gaga – A Star Is Born as Ally Maine; Melissa McCarthy – Can You Ever Forgive Me? as Lee Israel
**Best Actor in a Supporting Role**: **Mahershala Ali – Green Book as Don Shirley**‡; Adam Driver – BlacKkKlansman as Philip "Flip" Zimmerman; Sam Elliott – A Star Is Born as Bobby Maine; Richard E. Grant – Can You Ever Forgive Me? as Jack Hock; Sam Rockwell – Vice as George W. Bush	**Best Actress in a Supporting Role**: **Regina King – If Beale Street Could Talk as Sharon Rivers**‡; Amy Adams – Vice as Lynne Cheney; Marina de Tavira – Roma as Sofía; Emma Stone – The Favourite as Abigail Masham; Rachel Weisz – The Favourite as Sarah Churchill
**Best Writing (Original Screenplay)**: **Green Book – Nick Vallelonga, Brian Currie and Peter Farrelly**‡; The Favourite – Deborah Davis and Tony McNamara; First Reformed – Paul Schrader; Roma – Alfonso Cuarón; Vice – Adam McKay	**Best Writing (Adapted Screenplay)**: **BlacKkKlansman – Charlie Wachtel, David Rabinowitz, Kevin Willmott and Spike Lee; based on the book Black Klansman by Ron Stallworth‡**; The Ballad of Buster Scruggs – Joel Coen and Ethan Coen; All Gold Canyon is based on a story by Jack London; The Gal Who Got Rattled is inspired by a story by Stewart Edward White.; Can You Ever Forgive Me? – Nicole Holofcener and Jeff Whitty; based on the memoir by Lee Israel; If Beale Street Could Talk – Barry Jenkins; based on the book by James Baldwin; A Star Is Born – Eric Roth, Bradley Cooper and Will Fetters; based on the 1954 screenplay by Moss Hart and 1976 screenplay by Joan Didion, John Gregory Dunne and Frank Pierson; based on a story by Robert Carson and William A. Wellman
**Best Animated Feature Film**: **Spider-Man: Into the Spider-Verse – Bob Persichetti, Peter Ramsey, Rodney Rothman, Phil Lord and Christopher Miller**‡; Incredibles 2 – Brad Bird, John Walker and Nicole Paradis Grindle; Isle of Dogs – Wes Anderson, Scott Rudin, Steven Rales and Jeremy Dawson; Mirai – Mamoru Hosoda and Yuichiro Saito; Ralph Breaks the Internet – Rich Moore, Phil Johnston and Clark Spencer	**Best Foreign Language Film**: **Roma (Mexico) in Spanish and Mixtec – Directed by Alfonso Cuarón**‡; Capernaum (Lebanon) in Arabic – Directed by Nadine Labaki; Cold War (Poland) in Polish and French – Directed by Paweł Pawlikowski; Never Look Away (Germany) in German – Directed by Florian Henckel von Donnersmarck; Shoplifters (Japan) in Japanese – Directed by Hirokazu Kore-eda
**Best Documentary (Feature)**: **Free Solo – Elizabeth Chai Vasarhelyi, Jimmy Chin, Evan Hayes and Shannon Dill**‡; Hale County This Morning, This Evening – RaMell Ross, Joslyn Barnes and Su Kim; Minding the Gap – Bing Liu and Diane Quon; Of Fathers and Sons – Talal Derki, Ansgar Frerich, Eva Kemme and Tobias N. Siebert; RBG – Betsy West and Julie Cohen	**Best Documentary (Short Subject)**: **Period. End of Sentence. – Rayka Zehtabchi and Melissa Berton**‡; Black Sheep – Ed Perkins and Jonathan Chinn; End Game – Rob Epstein and Jeffrey Friedman; Lifeboat – Skye Fitzgerald and Bryn Mooser; A Night at the Garden – Marshall Curry
**Best Short Film (Live Action)**: **Skin – Guy Nattiv and Jaime Ray Newman**‡; Detainment – Vincent Lambe and Darren Mahon; Fauve – Jérémy Comte and Maria Gracia Turgeon; Marguerite – Marianne Farley and Marie-Hélène Panisset; Mother – Rodrigo Sorogoyen and María del Puy Alvarado	**Best Short Film (Animated)**: **Bao – Domee Shi and Becky Neiman-Cobb**‡; Animal Behaviour – Alison Snowden and David Fine; Late Afternoon – Louise Bagnall and Nuria González Blanco; One Small Step – Andrew Chesworth and Bobby Pontillas; Weekends – Trevor Jimenez
**Best Music (Original Score)**: **Black Panther – Ludwig Göransson**‡; BlacKkKlansman – Terence Blanchard; If Beale Street Could Talk – Nicholas Britell; Isle of Dogs – Alexandre Desplat; Mary Poppins Returns – Marc Shaiman	**Best Music (Original Song)**: **"Shallow" from A Star Is Born – Music and lyrics by Lady Gaga, Mark Ronson, Anthony Rossomando and Andrew Wyatt**‡; "All the Stars" from Black Panther – Music by Kendrick Lamar, Mark "Sounwave" Spears and Anthony "Top Dawg" Tiffith; lyrics by Kendrick Lamar, SZA and Anthony "Top Dawg" Tiffith; "I'll Fight" from RBG – Music and lyrics by Diane Warren; "The Place Where Lost Things Go" from Mary Poppins Returns – Music by Marc Shaiman; lyrics by Scott Wittman and Marc Shaiman; "When a Cowboy Trades His Spurs for Wings" from The Ballad of Buster Scruggs – Music and lyrics by Gillian Welch and David Rawlings
**Best Sound Editing**: **Bohemian Rhapsody – John Warhurst and Nina Hartstone**‡; Black Panther – Benjamin A. Burtt and Steve Boeddeker; First Man – Ai-Ling Lee and Mildred Iatrou Morgan; A Quiet Place – Ethan Van der Ryn and Erik Aadahl; Roma – Sergio Díaz and Skip Lievsay	**Best Sound Mixing**: **Bohemian Rhapsody – Paul Massey, Tim Cavagin and John Casali**‡; Black Panther – Steve Boeddeker, Brandon Proctor and Peter Devlin; First Man – Jon Taylor, Frank A. Montaño, Ai-Ling Lee and Mary H. Ellis; Roma – Skip Lievsay, Craig Henighan and José Antonio García; A Star Is Born – Tom Ozanich, Dean Zupancic, Jason Ruder and Steve Morrow
**Best Production Design**: **Black Panther – Production Design: Hannah Beachler; Set Decoration: Jay Hart**‡; The Favourite – Production Design: Fiona Crombie; Set Decoration: Alice Felton; First Man – Production Design: Nathan Crowley; Set Decoration: Kathy Lucas; Mary Poppins Returns – Production Design: John Myhre; Set Decoration: Gordon Sim; Roma – Production Design: Eugenio Caballero; Set Decoration: Bárbara Enríquez	**Best Cinematography**: **Roma – Alfonso Cuarón**‡; Cold War – Łukasz Żal; The Favourite – Robbie Ryan; Never Look Away – Caleb Deschanel; A Star Is Born – Matthew Libatique
**Best Makeup and Hairstyling**: **Vice – Greg Cannom, Kate Biscoe and Patricia Dehaney**‡; Border – Göran Lundström and Pamela Goldammer; Mary Queen of Scots – Jenny Shircore, Marc Pilcher and Jessica Brooks	**Best Costume Design**: **Black Panther – Ruth Carter‡**; The Ballad of Buster Scruggs – Mary Zophres; The Favourite – Sandy Powell; Mary Poppins Returns – Sandy Powell; Mary Queen of Scots – Alexandra Byrne
**Best Film Editing**: **Bohemian Rhapsody – John Ottman**‡; BlacKkKlansman – Barry Alexander Brown; The Favourite – Yorgos Mavropsaridis; Green Book – Patrick J. Don Vito; Vice – Hank Corwin	**Best Visual Effects**: **First Man – Paul Lambert, Ian Hunter, Tristan Myles and J. D. Schwalm**‡; Avengers: Infinity War – Dan DeLeeuw, Kelly Port, Russell Earl and Dan Sudick; Christopher Robin – Christopher Lawrence, Michael Eames, Theo Jones and Chris Corbould; Ready Player One – Roger Guyett, Grady Cofer, Matthew E. Butler and David Shirk; Solo: A Star Wars Story – Rob Bredow, Patrick Tubach, Neal Scanlan and Dominic Tuohy

=== Governors Awards ===
The Academy held its 10th annual Governors Awards ceremony on November 18, 2018, where the following awards were presented:

==== Honorary Awards ====
- To Marvin Levy, for an exemplary career in publicity that has brought films to the minds, hearts and souls of audiences all over the world.
- To Lalo Schifrin, in recognition of his unique musical style, compositional integrity and influential contributions to the art of film scoring.
- To Cicely Tyson, whose unforgettable performances and personal integrity have inspired generations of filmmakers, actors and audiences.

==== Irving G. Thalberg Memorial Award ====
The award honors "creative producers whose bodies of work reflect a consistently high quality of motion picture production".

- Kathleen Kennedy and Frank Marshall.

=== Films with multiple nominations and awards ===
Films with multiple nominations
Nominations	Film
10	The Favourite
10	Roma
8	A Star Is Born
8	Vice
7	Black Panther
6	BlacKkKlansman
5	Bohemian Rhapsody
5	Green Book
4	First Man
4	Mary Poppins Returns
3	The Ballad of Buster Scruggs
3	Can You Ever Forgive Me?
3	Cold War
3	If Beale Street Could Talk
2	Isle of Dogs
2	Mary Queen of Scots
2	Never Look Away
2	RBG

Films with multiple awards
Awards	Film
4	Bohemian Rhapsody
3	Black Panther
3	Green Book
3	Roma

== Presenters and performers ==
The following individuals, listed in order of appearance, presented awards or performed musical numbers.

=== Presenters ===
Name(s)	Role
Randy Thomas	Served as announcer for the 91st annual Academy Awards
Tina Fey; Amy Poehler; Maya Rudolph	Presented the award for Best Supporting Actress
Helen Mirren; Jason Momoa	Presented the award for Best Documentary Feature
Tom Morello	Presented Best Picture nominee Vice
Elsie Fisher; Stephan James	Presented the award for Best Makeup and Hairstyling
Brian Tyree Henry; Melissa McCarthy	Presented the award for Best Costume Design
Chris Evans; Jennifer Lopez	Presented the award for Best Production Design
Tyler Perry	Presented the award for Best Cinematography
Emilia Clarke	Introduced the performance of Best Original Song nominee "I'll Fight"
Serena Williams	Presented Best Picture nominee A Star Is Born
Danai Gurira; James McAvoy	Presented the awards for Best Sound Editing and Best Sound Mixing
Queen Latifah	Presented Best Picture nominee The Favourite
Javier Bardem; Angela Bassett	Presented the award for Best Foreign Language Film
Keegan-Michael Key	Introduced the performance of Best Original Song nominee "The Place Where Lost Things Go"
Trevor Noah	Presented Best Picture nominee Black Panther
Michael Keaton	Presented the award for Best Film Editing
Daniel Craig; Charlize Theron	Presented the award for Best Supporting Actor
Laura Dern	Presented a segment highlighting progress on construction of the Academy Museum of Motion Pictures
Pharrell Williams; Michelle Yeoh	Presented the award for Best Animated Feature Film
Kacey Musgraves	Introduced the performance of Best Original Song nominee "When a Cowboy Trades His Spurs for Wings"
Dana Carvey; Mike Myers	Presented Best Picture nominee Bohemian Rhapsody
Awkwafina; John Mulaney	Presented the awards for Best Animated Short Film and Best Documentary Short Subject
José Andrés; Diego Luna	Presented Best Picture nominee Roma
Sarah Paulson; Paul Rudd	Presented the award for Best Visual Effects
KiKi Layne; Krysten Ritter	Presented the award for Best Live Action Short Film
Samuel L. Jackson; Brie Larson	Presented the awards for Best Original Screenplay and Best Adapted Screenplay
Michael B. Jordan; Tessa Thompson	Presented the award for Best Original Score
Chadwick Boseman; Constance Wu	Presented the award for Best Original Song
John Bailey (AMPAS president)	Presented the "In Memoriam" tribute
Barbra Streisand	Presented Best Picture nominee BlacKkKlansman
Allison Janney; Gary Oldman	Presented the award for Best Actor
John Lewis; Amandla Stenberg	Presented Best Picture nominee Green Book
Frances McDormand; Sam Rockwell	Presented the award for Best Actress
Guillermo del Toro	Presented the award for Best Director
Julia Roberts	Presented the award for Best Picture

=== Performers ===
Name(s)	Role	Performed
Rickey Minor	Musical director conductor	Orchestral
Queen + Adam Lambert	Performers	"We Will Rock You" and "We Are the Champions"
Jennifer Hudson	Performer	"I'll Fight" from RBG
Bette Midler	Performer	"The Place Where Lost Things Go" from Mary Poppins Returns
David Rawlings; Gillian Welch	Performers	"When a Cowboy Trades His Spurs for Wings" from The Ballad of Buster Scruggs
Bradley Cooper; Lady Gaga	Performers	"Shallow" from A Star Is Born
Los Angeles Philharmonic	Performers	"Leaving Home" during the annual "In Memoriam" tribute

== Ceremony information ==
On October 22, 2018, the Academy hired film producer Donna Gigliotti and television producer Glenn Weiss to oversee production of the 2019 ceremony. "Donna and Glenn will infuse new energy and vision into this 91st awards presentation, and we are excited about a broad-based creative relationship with these two artists", Academy President John Bailey said in a press release announcing the decision. Furthermore, AMPAS CEO Dawn Hudson added, "We're thrilled to work with someone as passionate about the Academy as Donna Gigliotti — an Oscar winner and multiple nominee. She and the now-famous Glenn Weiss are committed to making the most of the innovations we've embraced for our 91st Oscars."

On December 4, 2018, Deadline Hollywood reported that actor and comedian Kevin Hart was considered as the host by the Academy and ABC. On the same day he announced via Instagram that he would host the show. Afterwards, social media used reminded about anti-gay slurs and language is his old tweets and stand-up routines nearly a decade ago. In a response, the Academy warned him that if he wouldn't apologize, he would be dismissed. On December 6, 2018, he announced that he resigned from hosting, arguing that he had already apologized multiple times and adding: "I'm not going to continue to go back and tap into the days of old when I've moved on and I'm in a completely different place in my life." He also added he did not want to be a "distraction" to the ceremony in light of the controversy. The following February, broadcaster ABC Entertainment chief Karey Burke announced that the festivities would proceed without a host. During an interview at the Television Critics Association press tour, Burke stated, "The main goal, which I was told, was the Academy promised ABC last year after a very lengthy telecast to keep the show to three hours. Producers wisely decided not to have a host and to go back to having the presenters and movies be the stars, and that be the best way to keep the show at a brisk three hours."

Other people participated in the production of the ceremony. Production designer David Korins designed a new stage for the show, featuring 41,000 Swarovski crystals, thousands of Swarovski beads and pearls, as well as roses. Randy Thomas served as announcer for the ceremony. Musician Rickey Minor was hired as music director and conductor. Queen + Adam Lambert performed a medley of the songs "We Will Rock You" and "We Are the Champions" as part of the program's opening number.

=== Proposed "Popular Film" category ===
Due to the declining viewership of the recent Academy Awards ceremonies, AMPAS sought new ideas to revamp the show while renewing interest with the nominated films. In August 2018, the organization announced plans to add a new category honoring achievement in "Popular Film". The proposal was met with criticism because the award's implied focus on blockbuster suggested that artistic films and other non-mainstream pictures were not "popular with audiences". Furthermore, many viewed the creation of this new category to be a ploy to boost ratings and that it could hamper critically successful mainstream films from being nominated for Best Picture despite the insistence of AMPAS that such movies could be eligible for both categories. In light of the backlash, the Academy announced the following month that it would postpone implementation of the new category in order to seek additional input. AMPAS president John Bailey later admitted that the proposed category was intended to help improve viewership, and noted that the concept of a separate award for commercial film dates back to the inaugural awards ceremony, which had separate categories for "Outstanding Picture" and "Best Unique and Artistic Picture".

=== Unsuccessful efforts to shorten the ceremony ===
In an effort to shorten the ceremony, it was reported that only two of the nominees for Best Original Song, "All the Stars" and "Shallow", would be performed live. According to Diane Warren, Lady Gaga decided not to perform if the other three songs would be excluded. After a negative reaction from audiences and industry musicians, including Lin-Manuel Miranda and members of the music branch, the Academy backtracked and announced that all five Best Original Song nominees would be performed during the ceremony. "All the Stars" would not be performed, however, with Variety reporting that there were "logistics and timing issues" with its performers, Kendrick Lamar and SZA.

On February 11, AMPAS announced that the presentation of four awards categories, Best Cinematography, Best Live Action Short Film, Best Film Editing, and Best Makeup and Hairstyling, would occur during commercial breaks. They said that these presentations would be streamed so viewers could watch them live online, and that the winners' acceptance speeches would be replayed later in the broadcast. The decision received extensive backlash from audiences. Several filmmakers, including Guillermo del Toro, Christopher Nolan, Martin Scorsese, Quentin Tarantino, Damien Chazelle, Spike Lee, Joe Dante and Alfonso Cuarón (the latter of whom was nominated and won in one of the aforementioned categories), signed on to an open letter to the Academy asking it to reverse its decision. Four days later, the Academy reversed the decision and announced that all 24 categories would be presented live.

=== Box office performance of Best Picture nominees ===
When the nominations were announced, seven of the eight films nominated for Best Picture had earned a combined gross of $1.26 billion at the American and Canadian box offices at the time. Black Panther was the highest-grossing film among the Best Picture nominees with $700 million in domestic box office receipts. A Star is Born came in second with $204.8 million; this was followed by Bohemian Rhapsody ($202.4 million), BlacKkKlansman ($48.5 million), Green Book ($42.3 million), Vice ($39.5 million), and The Favourite ($23 million). Box office figures for Roma were unavailable due to distributor Netflix's policy of refusing to release such figures.

=== Critical reviews and ratings ===
Some media outlets received the broadcast positively. Chuck Barney of The Mercury News commented, "After months of bad buzz and embarrassing missteps, the 91st Academy Awards appeared to be on their way to an epic fail." He also remarked, "The show, as usual, had some rocky moments, but overall it was a lively, well-paced and entertaining affair." Television critic Matthew Gilbert of The Boston Globe wrote, "The hostless Oscar ceremony felt a little more streamlined and energetic than usual, as we were spared yet another predictable opening goof on the nominated movies, a monologue pretending to make fun of the stars, and short quips across the night that never quite land." The Hollywood Reporter television critic Daniel Fienberg quipped, "Sunday's Oscars telecast definitely confirmed that under the right circumstances, a host isn't a necessity." In addition, he said, "The show was not overwhelmed by montages or stunts or tributes, and it also wasn't weighed down by elaborately prepared presenter schtick."

Others were more critical of the show. Kelly Lawler of USA Today wrote, "The 2019 Oscar telecast lacked energy and comedy, and was treacherously dull. And maybe that could have been avoided if the Academy had done what it has (almost) always done, and procured a host." She also observed that the awards "were more like a press conference with movie clips in the middle". Television critic Hank Stuever of The Washington Post commented, "They kept all the speeches but lost any trace of the unpredictable magic. They opened with Queen (the actual band, fronted by their usual Freddie Mercury replacement, Adam Lambert) and a promise that 'We Will Rock You,' but we all know better. The Oscar telecast has never rocked anyone." He ended his review stating, "It's painful, year after year, to watch show business struggle to find a better way to put on a satisfying show."

The American telecast on ABC drew in an average of 29.56 million people over its length, which was a 12% increase from the previous year's ceremony. The show also earned higher Nielsen ratings compared to the previous ceremony with 16.4% of households watching the ceremony. In addition, it garnered a higher 18–49 demo rating with a 7.7 rating among viewers in that demographic. Its Live+7 ratings were 30.541 million viewers, which made it the fourth top rated programme in American television in 2019 among total viewers and the fifth top rated programme among 18–49 demo, behind sport events only.

In July 2018, the ceremony presentation received eight nominations for the 71st Primetime Emmy Awards.

== "In Memoriam" ==
The annual "In Memoriam" segment was presented by Academy president John Bailey. The Los Angeles Philharmonic led by conductor Gustavo Dudamel performed an excerpt of "Leaving Home" from Superman by John Williams during the montage.

- Susan Anspach – actress
- Ermanno Olmi – director, writer
- Richard Greenberg – title designer, visual effects
- John N. Carter – film editor
- John Morris – composer
- Bernardo Bertolucci – director, writer
- Michel Legrand – composer
- Margot Kidder – actress
- Alixe Gordin – casting director
- Neil Simon – writer
- Richard H. Kline – cinematographer
- Vittorio Taviani – director, writer
- Elizabeth Sung – actress
- Françoise Bonnot – film editor
- Burt Reynolds – actor, director
- Kitty O'Neil – stunt performer
- Pablo Ferro – title designer, graphic artist
- Samuel Hadida – producer, distributor, executive
- Raymond Chow – producer, executive
- Pierre Rissient – festival selector, publicist, distributor, producer
- Anne V. Coates – film editor
- Paul Bloch – publicist
- Shinobu Hashimoto – writer
- Richard Marks – film editor
- Stéphane Audran – actress
- Robby Müller – cinematographer
- Craig Zadan – producer
- Barbara Harris – actress
- Claude Lanzmann – documentarian, director
- Martin Bregman – producer, manager
- Nelson Pereira dos Santos – director
- Will Vinton – animator
- Miloš Forman – director
- Witold Sobociński – cinematographer
- Daniel C. Striepeke – make-up artist
- Penny Marshall – director, producer, actress
- Isao Takahata – animation director
- Stephen Vaughan – still photographer
- Stan Lee – comic book writer, executive producer
- William Goldman – writer
- John M. Dwyer – set decorator
- Tab Hunter – actor
- Yvonne Blake – costume designer
- Nicolas Roeg – director, cinematographer
- James Karen – actor
- Gregg Rudloff – sound mixer
- Gloria Katz – writer, producer
- Bruno Ganz – actor
- Audrey Wells – writer, director
- Albert Finney – actor

== See also ==
- 76th Golden Globe Awards
- 25th Screen Actors Guild Awards
- 72nd British Academy Film Awards
- List of submissions to the 91st Academy Awards for Best Foreign Language Film
- List of most watched United States television broadcasts of 2019
