= Mary, Queen of Scots (1971 film) =

1971 historical drama film by Charles Jarrott

- Original theatrical poster
- Directed by: Charles Jarrott
- Written by: John Hale
- Produced by: Hal B. Wallis
- Starring: Vanessa Redgrave; Glenda Jackson; Timothy Dalton; Nigel Davenport; Patrick McGoohan; Trevor Howard; Ian Holm
- Cinematography: Christopher Challis
- Edited by: Richard Marden
- Music by: John Barry
- Distributed by: Universal Pictures
- Release dates: 22 December 1971 (Los Angeles); 27 March 1972 (London)
- Running time: 128 minutes
- Countries: United Kingdom; United States
- Language: English
- Budget: $4.5 million

Mary, Queen of Scots is a 1971 historical drama film based on the life of Mary Stuart, Queen of Scotland, written by John Hale and directed by Charles Jarrott. The cast was led by Vanessa Redgrave as the title character and Glenda Jackson as Elizabeth I. Jackson had previously played the part of Elizabeth in the BBC TV drama Elizabeth R, screened in February and March 1971, the first episode of which was also written by Hale.

The film received mixed reviews with criticism of the screenplay, running length and historical inaccuracies; however it received praise for the leading female performances, its production values, and musical score. At the 44th Academy Awards, the film received five nominations including Best Actress (for Redgrave).

== Plot ==
Following the death of her husband Francis II of France in 1560, Mary, Queen of Scots returns to her native land. Though fearless, unselfish, and very beautiful, the young queen faces many challenges. As in neighbouring England, the Protestant faith has been embraced by many of the nobility; in addition, the Catholic Mary has to deal with her Protestant and illegitimate half-brother James Stewart, Lord Moray's ambition to rule. He suggests that Mary enjoy herself in Scotland, and pass the time with dancing and feasting.

Fearing that Mary has ambitions for England's throne, Elizabeth I of England decides to weaken her claim by sending her favourite, the ambitious Robert Dudley, to woo and marry Mary. Elizabeth promises that Mary will become her heir if she agrees to the marriage. Sly Elizabeth also sends the younger, dashing but weak and spoiled Lord Darnley from a powerful Catholic family. Tempted by the handsome Darnley, Mary impulsively chooses him for marriage. Moray opposes the marriage, but Mary ignores him. She exiles Moray to strengthen her own authority. Elizabeth is satisfied that reckless, passionate Mary's romantic misadventures will keep her busy in Scotland and give England less to worry about.

Soon after the wedding, Darnley throws a childish temper tantrum, complaining that he has no real power and is merely Mary's king consort. Disillusioned, Mary soon banishes Darnley from her bed and frequently consults with the gentle, soft-spoken Italian musician and courtier David Riccio. Darnley previously had him as a lover and accuses him of fathering Mary's expected child.

A group of Scottish lords persuade Darnley to help get rid of Riccio, whom they murder in Mary's presence. To escape, she persuades Darnley that the plotters will turn against him, and they flee to the safety of a castle belonging to Lord Bothwell. He has been an ally of Mary since her arrival in Scotland. After he defeats the plotters, Mary forces a truce between Moray, Darnley and Bothwell. Mary gives birth to a son, James, who is expected to succeed both Mary and the unmarried, childless Elizabeth.

The peace is short-lived. Darnley still wants power, though by now he is hideously scarred and dying of syphilis (the pox). Mary pities him, but finds herself falling in love with the rough but loyal Bothwell. With Moray's help, they arrange for Darnley to be killed in a gunpowder explosion at his manor; Darnley escapes before the blast but is strangled. Bothwell marries Mary, and their few brief nights together are blissful. But Moray rejoins the Scottish lords and leads a rebellion against Mary. He forces her to abdicate, and she and her husband are driven into exile, Mary to England and Bothwell to Denmark. Mary's young son James is to be crowned king of Scotland (although Moray will effectively rule as regent) and raised as a Protestant.

In England, Mary begs Elizabeth for money and an army to regain her throne. Instead Elizabeth takes her prisoner, keeping her locked away in a remote castle. Elizabeth's closest advisor, Sir William Cecil, is anxious to get rid of Mary, but Elizabeth fears to set a precedent by putting an anointed monarch to death. She also fears that Mary's death might spark a rebellion by her Catholic subjects and cause problems with powerful France and Spain. As a result, Mary is doomed to an open-ended captivity. Over time, the once proud queen of Scots succumbs to an empty routine, plotting half-heartedly to escape but growing increasingly used to her seclusion. She occupies herself with a daily schedule of cards, embroidery and gossip, talking vaguely of escape yet sleeping later and later each morning.

With the help of fellow minister Walsingham, Cecil finds evidence of Mary's involvement in the conspiracy to assassinate Elizabeth known as the Babington Plot. Finally Elizabeth confronts Mary, who regains her royal pride and behaves defiantly at their secret meeting. Although Elizabeth offers her mercy if she begs for forgiveness, Mary will not beg for mercy in public. She endures the trial, conviction and execution. She knows her son James will ultimately succeed to the English throne.

== Cast ==
- Vanessa Redgrave as Mary, Queen of Scots
- Glenda Jackson as Queen Elizabeth I of England
- Patrick McGoohan as Mary's half-brother James Stewart, 1st Earl of Moray
- Timothy Dalton as Mary's second husband Henry Stuart, Lord Darnley
- Nigel Davenport as Mary's third husband, James Hepburn, 4th Earl of Bothwell
- Trevor Howard as Elizabeth's advisor Sir William Cecil
- Daniel Massey as Elizabeth's lover, Robert Dudley, 1st Earl of Leicester
- Ian Holm as Mary's advisor, David Riccio
- Andrew Keir as Ruthven
- Tom Fleming as John Ballard
- Robert James as Scottish religious reformer John Knox
- Katherine Kath as Mary's first mother-in-law, Catherine de' Medici
- Frances White as Mary's companion, Mary Fleming
- Vernon Dobtcheff as Mary's uncle, the Duke of Guise
- Raf De La Torre as her other uncle, the Cardinal of Lorraine
- Richard Warner as Elizabeth's spy master Francis Walsingham
- Bruce Purchase as the Earl of Morton
- Brian Coburn as the Earl of Huntly
- Richard Denning as Mary's first husband, King Francis II of France
- Maria Aitken as Lady Bothwell
- Jeremy Bulloch as Andrew

== Production notes ==
The movie reunited Hal Wallis, John Hale and Charles Jarrott who had made Anne of a Thousand Days. Wallis was looking to do a follow-up and decided to make a film about Mary Queen of Scots, in part because a best-selling book about her by Antonia Fraser was in the news. "I did not read it because I knew it was based on historical fact and was sure there was nothing in it we couldn't obtain from a study of history books," claimed Wallis in his memoirs.

Like the play by Friedrich Schiller (Maria Stuart, 1800) and the opera by Gaetano Donizetti (Maria Stuarda, 1835), it takes considerable liberties with history in order to achieve increased dramatic effect, in particular two fictitious face-to-face encounters between the two queens (who never met in real life). "Audiences would feel cheated if they never had a scene together." said Wallis.

Wallis says Jarrott wanted to emphasise the religious differences of the two lead characters but the producer "felt this was too heavy".

Vanessa Redgrave and Glenda Jackson were the first choices for their roles. Jackson agreed to play the role if all her scenes could be shot in three and a half weeks "before boredom set in". The script was rewritten accordingly.

Glenda Jackson said during filming, "I prefer Vanessa's part. Mary was a tart—three marriages, one to a man with syphilis, murders, prison, intrigue, violence—the whole lot." She said Elizabeth "is no virgin the way I'm playing her."

=== Shooting ===
Filming started 17 May 1971. The film was shot in France (Château de Chenonceau), Hermitage Castle, Scotland; and in England at Alnwick Castle, Bamburgh Castle, Parham Park in West Sussex, and Chiltern Open Air Museum in Buckinghamshire. The song in the opening sequence, "Vivre et Mourir", is sung by Redgrave.

The lyrics are taken from a sonnet written by Mary, Queen of Scots.

Redgrave and Timothy Dalton began a romantic relationship during the making of the film.

== Release ==
The film's UK premiere was the annual Royal Film Performance on 27 March 1972 at the Odeon Leicester Square, attended by Queen Elizabeth the Queen Mother. It grossed £19,815 ($47,566) in its first 9 days of release after the premiere.

== Reception ==
Vincent Canby had little good to write about the film in The New York Times, describing it as "a loveless, passionless costume drama". He wrote: "Unfortunately there is no excitement whatsoever in what Charles Jarrott, the director, and John Hale, the author of the original screenplay, have put together ... Mary, Queen of Scots intends, I assume, to illuminate history ... yet all it's really doing is touching bases, like a dull, dutiful student ... Because both Miss Redgrave and Miss Jackson possess identifiable intelligence, [the film] is not as difficult to sit through as some bad movies I can think of. It's just solemn, well-groomed and dumb."

Roger Ebert gave the film three stars and lauded the interpretation of Redgrave and Jackson, stating: "Vanessa Redgrave is a tall, straight-backed, finely spirited Mary, and Glenda Jackson makes a perfectly shrewish, wise Elizabeth."

Variety said "commercial prospects are good."

== Awards and nominations ==
Award	Category	Nominee(s)	Result	Ref.
Academy Awards	Best Actress	Vanessa Redgrave	Nominated	
Academy Awards	Best Art Direction	Terence Marsh, Robert Cartwright, Peter Howitt	Nominated	
Academy Awards	Best Costume Design	Margaret Furse	Nominated	
Academy Awards	Best Original Dramatic Score	John Barry	Nominated	
Academy Awards	Best Sound	Bob Jones, John Aldred	Nominated	
Golden Globe Awards	Best Motion Picture – Drama		Nominated	
Golden Globe Awards	Best Actress in a Motion Picture – Drama	Vanessa Redgrave	Nominated	
Golden Globe Awards	Best Actress in a Motion Picture – Drama	Glenda Jackson	Nominated	
Golden Globe Awards	Best Screenplay – Motion Picture	John Hale	Nominated	
Golden Globe Awards	Best Original Score	John Barry	Nominated	

== See also ==
- Mary of Scotland (1936), starring Katharine Hepburn and Fredric March
- Mary Queen of Scots (2013), starring Camille Rutherford and Sean Biggerstaff
- Mary Queen of Scots (2018), starring Saoirse Ronan and Margot Robbie

== Bibliography ==
- Wallis, Hal B.; Higham, Charles (1980). Starmaker : the autobiography of Hal Wallis. Macmillan Pub. Co. ISBN 978-0-02-623170-1.
