= Mary of Scotland (film) =

1936 film by John Ford

- Movie poster
- Directed by: John Ford
- Screenplay by: Dudley Nichols
- Based on: Mary of Scotland; 1933 play by Maxwell Anderson
- Produced by: Pandro S. Berman
- Starring: Katharine Hepburn; Fredric March; Florence Eldridge; Douglas Walton; John Carradine
- Cinematography: Joseph H. August; Jack MacKenzie
- Edited by: Jane Loring
- Music by: Nathaniel Shilkret
- Production company: RKO Radio Pictures
- Distributed by: RKO Radio Pictures
- Release dates: July 30, 1936 (New York City); August 28, 1936 (U.S.)
- Running time: 123 minutes
- Country: United States
- Language: English
- Budget: $864,000
- Box office: $1,276,000

Mary of Scotland is a 1936 American historical drama film starring Katharine Hepburn as Mary, Queen of Scots. Directed by John Ford, it is an adaptation of the 1933 Maxwell Anderson play, with Fredric March reprising the role of Bothwell, which he also performed on stage during the run of play. The screenplay was written by Dudley Nichols. Ginger Rogers wanted to play this role and made a screen test, but RKO rejected her request to be cast in the part feeling that the role was not suitable to her image.

== Plot ==
In 1561, Mary Stuart, the young widow of Francis II of France, sets sail for her native Scotland to re-establish herself as monarch. In spite of attempts by her politically insecure cousin, Queen Elizabeth of England, to prevent her from reaching Scotland, Mary lands safely with her Italian secretary, David Rizzio, and rides to Holyrood Palace near Edinburgh.

Immediately upon her arrival, Mary is confronted by her half brother, James Stewart, the Earl of Moray, who is the leader of the country's ruling noblemen, and is questioned about her devotion to Catholicism and her refusal to marry. While the noblemen select a council for Mary, the queen is denounced publicly as a "wicked" Catholic by John Knox, an outspoken Protestant leader. Knox's accusations are countered by the equally eloquent Earl of Bothwell, who in spite of his own Protestantism, pledges his loyalty to Mary and demands that he be named Scotland's military chief.

Enraged by Mary's success at charming her court, Elizabeth plots with Throckmorton, the new Scottish ambassador, to use Moray against her. At the same time, Rizzio encourages Mary to wed Lord Darnley, a Catholic who is the heir to the English crown after Elizabeth. Although she loves Bothwell, Mary rejects his proposal and marries the foppish Darnley. Soon after, Mary's council tries to force her to dismiss Rizzio and, when she refuses, goads the sexually frustrated Darnley into accusing the Italian of adultery. In Mary's bedroom, a group of Scottish lords murder Rizzio and, as a drunken Darnley watches, force the queen to sign a false confession of infidelity. Aided by Bothwell's loyal troops, Mary and Darnley escape and thwart Moray and Elizabeth's conspiracy.

A year after Mary gives birth to a boy, James, a still discontented Darnley threatens to disown his son as his legitimate heir. Before he is able to carry out his plan, however, Darnley is burned alive in his private refuge, which is destroyed by planted explosives. As Knox damns Bothwell as Darnley's murderer, the earl "kidnaps" Mary and, in defiance of the council, secretly marries her. Twenty days later, Moray abducts baby James, and the rebel lords attack Holyrod Castle. Outnumbered by Moray's troops, Bothwell finally agrees to leave Scotland if Mary is allowed to remain queen. In spite of his promises, Moray forces Mary to abdicate and, after imprisoning her, makes himself regent.

Eventually Mary escapes and, believing Elizabeth to support her cause, flees to England. Elizabeth, however, takes Mary prisoner and, after Bothwell dies a mad man in a Danish jail, puts her on trial for treason. Crushed by the news of Bothwell's death, Mary eagerly accepts her inevitable condemnation and refuses to renounce the Stuart claim to the English throne, even when offered clemency by Elizabeth. Satisfied that she has enjoyed a more rewarding life than the ambitious Elizabeth, Mary faces her execution with courage.

== Cast ==
- Katharine Hepburn as Mary, Queen of Scots
- Fredric March as James Hepburn, 4th Earl of Bothwell
- Florence Eldridge as Elizabeth I
- Douglas Walton as Henry Stuart, Lord Darnley
- John Carradine as David Rizzio
- Robert Barrat as Morton
- Gavin Muir as Leicester
- Ian Keith as James Stewart, 1st Earl of Moray
- Moroni Olsen as John Knox
- William Stack as Lord Ruthven
- Ralph Forbes as Randolph
- Alan Mowbray as Francis Throckmorton
- Frieda Inescort as Mary Beaton
- Donald Crisp as Huntly
- David Torrence as Lindsay
- Molly Lamont as Mary Livingston
- Anita Colby as Mary Fleming
- Jean Fenwick as Mary Seton
- Lionel Pape as Burghley
- Alec Craig as Donal
- Mary Gordon as Nurse
- Monte Blue as Messenger
- Leonard Mudie as Maitland
- Brandon Hurst as Airan
- Wilfred Lucas as Lexington
- D'Arcy Corrigan as Kirkcaldy
- Frank Baker as Douglas
- Cyril McLaglen as Faudoncide
- Doris Lloyd as Fisherman's Wife
- Robert Warwick as Sir Francis Knollys
- Murray Kinnell as a Judge
- Lawrence Grant as a Judge
- Ivan F. Simpson as a Judge
- Nigel De Brulier as a Judge
- Barlowe Borland as a Judge
- Walter Byron as Walsingham
- Wyndham Standing as a Sergeant-at-Arms
- Earle Foxe as the Earl of Kent
- Paul McAllister as du Croche
- Lionel Belmore as a Fisherman
- Gaston Glass as the Frenchman
- Neil Fitzgerald as the Nobleman
- Tommy Bupp as Boy in Boat (uncredited)
- Robert Homans as Jailer (uncredited)
- Harry Tenbrook as Guard (uncredited)
- Bobs Watson as Fisherman's Son (uncredited)

== Historical Accuracy ==
The film does not keep close to the historical truth, portraying Mary as a wronged martyr and her third husband (James Hepburn, 4th Earl of Bothwell) as a romantic hero. While it is true that Bothwell was well known as a philanderer, his last marriage to Mary was genuine. Regarding Mary's historical status, the false imprisonment by Elizabeth I and Anglo Protestant intrigue in Scotland did undermine her claim to the throne of Scotland and the throne of England, making her a direct threat to Elizabeth I.

At the beginning of the movie, Mary is described as the legitimate heir of Henry VIII, when in fact she was the heir of James V. Her claim to the English throne is through Henry. She had legitimate claims to both thrones and was Elizabeth's heir. Due to Henry's marriage annulment to Elizabeth's mother Anne Boleyn, she was considered by many to be illegitimate. As the granddaughter of Margaret Tudor (daughter of King Henry VII of England), Mary was considered by many to be the legitimate heir to England's throne as well as Scotland's.

== Reception ==
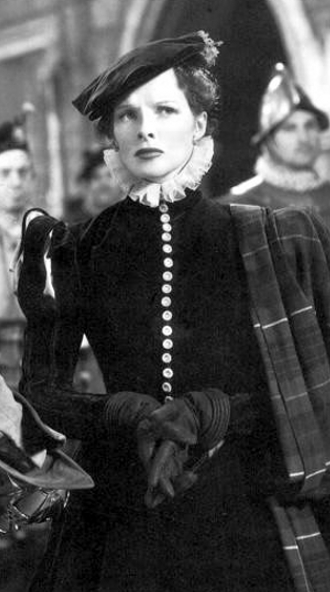
Hepburn in a publicity still from film

Contemporary reviews were generally positive. Frank S. Nugent of The New York Times wrote it had a "blend of excellence and mere adequacy." He wrote that the film had "depth, vigor and warm humanity" but had scenes which "lack the vitality they possessed in the play", and considered Hepburn's characterization of the title role rather too soft in comparison with the historical Mary. Variety praised the "extra-strong cast" and Ford's "sure-footed" direction. Hepburn's performance was described as "not really Mary Stuart but rather Katie Hepburn. And that is all in the film's favor because it humanizes it all and makes it that much more nearly acceptable." However, the review also found the film too long and the ending too sad, and conceding it could not end any other way without "completely corrupting history." "Impressive historical drama finely acted and produced with all-around distinction", reported Film Daily. Motion Picture Daily called the film "a splendidly powerful drama" with a "sincere, intelligent and genuine" performance by Hepburn. Russell Maloney reviewed the film negatively in The New Yorker, writing that despite its high production values, "it has little or nothing to do with Maxwell Anderson's play. Any other historical drama of the period could have been sandwiched in between these scenes and it wouldn't have made a bit of difference." Of Hepburn's performance, Maloney wrote that she had "the cards stacked against her from the very start, because pageantry naturally interferes with characterization."

The film is not regarded well by critics today, with Guardian critic Alex von Tunzelmann pointing out that, although Katharine Hepburn makes for a ‘spirited Mary, even if this version of her story goes a little heavy on the romantic goo.' and in its time, it was a box office flop, causing a loss of $165,000. This was Katharine Hepburn's second flop in a row, causing her to being labeled "box office poison" in the late 1930s, leading to (after a two-year screen absence) her move to MGM for her comeback in The Philadelphia Story in 1940.

== See also ==
- Mary, Queen of Scots (1971), starring Vanessa Redgrave and Glenda Jackson
- Mary Queen of Scots (2013), starring Camille Rutherford and Sean Biggerstaff
- Mary Queen of Scots (2018), starring Saoirse Ronan and Margot Robbie
