= Mary Queen of Scots (2018 film) =

2018 film by Josie Rourke

- Theatrical release poster
- Directed by: Josie Rourke
- Screenplay by: Beau Willimon
- Based on: Queen of Scots: The True Life of Mary Stuart; 2004 book by John Guy
- Produced by: Tim Bevan; Eric Fellner; Debra Hayward
- Starring: Saoirse Ronan; Margot Robbie; Jack Lowden; Joe Alwyn; David Tennant; Guy Pearce
- Cinematography: John Mathieson
- Edited by: Chris Dickens
- Music by: Max Richter
- Production companies: Perfect World Pictures; Working Title Films
- Distributed by: Focus Features (United States); Universal Pictures (International)
- Release dates: 15 November 2018 (AFI); 7 December 2018 (United States); 18 January 2019 (United Kingdom)
- Running time: 125 minutes
- Countries: United Kingdom; United States
- Language: English
- Budget: $25 million
- Box office: $48.5 million

Mary Queen of Scots is a 2018 historical drama film directed by Josie Rourke (in her feature directorial debut) and with a screenplay by Beau Willimon based on John Guy's 2004 biography Queen of Scots: The True Life of Mary Stuart. The film stars Saoirse Ronan as Mary, Queen of Scots, and Margot Robbie as her cousin, the English monarch, Queen Elizabeth I. Jack Lowden, Joe Alwyn, David Tennant, and Guy Pearce also star in supporting roles.

Mary Queen of Scots had its world premiere on closing night of AFI Fest on 15 November 2018, was released in the United States on 7 December 2018, and in the United Kingdom on 18 January 2019. The film received mixed reviews, with praise for the performances (particularly Robbie) and costumes, but was criticised for the screenplay and several historical inaccuracies. The film received three nominations at the 72nd British Academy Film Awards, and two nominations, for Best Costume Design and Best Makeup and Hairstyling, at the 91st Academy Awards. For her performance, Robbie earned nominations for a SAG Award and BAFTA Award for Best Supporting Actress.

== Plot ==
In 1561, after the death of her husband King Francis II, nineteen-year-old Mary Stuart returns to Scotland from France to take up her throne. She is received by her illegitimate half brother, James Stewart, Earl of Moray.

In neighboring England, Mary's twenty-eight-year-old, unmarried and childless cousin Elizabeth Tudor, the Protestant Queen of England, is threatened by Mary's claim to the English throne. Mary dismisses the cleric John Knox, a Protestant leader of the Scottish Reformation, from the Scottish court. He views the young Catholic queen as a danger to the Protestant religion in Scotland.

To weaken her cousin's threat, Elizabeth arranges for Mary, whom many English Catholics regard as England's rightful queen, to be married to an Englishman. Elizabeth chooses Lord Robert Dudley, her childhood friend whom she secretly loves; although he and Mary are unwilling, news of Elizabeth's case of smallpox convinces Mary to accept, provided she is named heiress apparent.

Reluctant to let go of Dudley, Elizabeth sends Henry Stuart, Lord Darnley to Scotland with the pretence of living under their religious freedom. Despite sensing the ulterior motive, Mary grows fond of Darnley so accepts his proposal.

Mary's marriage causes a constitutional crisis within both realms: Elizabeth is advised to oppose her cousin's marriage for fear that Darnley, a Stuart grandchild of Margaret Tudor, will elevate Mary's claim to her throne; Mary's council is suspicious of Darnley, fearing an English takeover.

Both kingdoms demand Darnley's return to England, but Mary refuses, leading Moray to mount a rebellion against her. Mary marries Darnley, only to discover him in bed with her private secretary, David Rizzio. She defeats the rebel forces but spares Rizzio and Moray and demands that Darnley give her a child. When their son, James, is conceived and born, Mary declares she brings "an heir to Scotland and to England" – offending the English.

Moray colludes with Darnley's father, Matthew Stewart, 4th Earl of Lennox, to undermine his sister. Spreading false rumors that her son was actually fathered by Rizzio, drives Knox to denounce Mary as an adulteress. Fearing these accusations and the possible discovery of his bisexuality, Darnley is pressured into murdering Rizzio.

Uncovering the plot, Mary convinces Darnley to escape with her, which is actually a ploy for her army to detain him. Mary agrees to pardon the conspirators if she is presented with evidence that Darnley took part. She ultimately forgives Moray and asks Elizabeth to be James's godmother. Both queens agree James is the heir presumptive despite the English court's hostility. Mary banishes Darnley but refuses to divorce him, despite her council's appeals. Her adviser and protector James Hepburn, Earl of Bothwell, then has him killed.

After Darnley's murder, Mary must flee, leaving behind her son. Bothwell says that her council has decided she must marry a Scotsman immediately—which should be Bothwell himself. She resists and suspects he was involved in Darnley's murder, but after he threatens and subsequently rapes her, she acquiesces. Knox preaches that Mary is a "harlot" who had her husband killed, leading Moray and her court to demand her abdication. Mary obliges and flees to England.

Elizabeth arranges a clandestine meeting, where Mary asks for help to take back her throne. Unwilling to go to war on behalf of a Catholic queen, Elizabeth promises a safe exile in England as long as Mary does not aid her enemies. Mary responds that if she was to do so, it would only be because Elizabeth forced her to and threatens that should Elizabeth kill her, she should remember that she would "murder" her sister and queen.

Placing Mary under house arrest, Elizabeth receives compelling evidence that Mary conspired with her enemies to have her assassinated, and reluctantly orders Mary's execution. As Mary walks to the scaffold, a remorseful Elizabeth cries for her. Mary's servants then reveal a bright red dress, implying Mary to be a martyr. In her final words, Mary hopes her son will have a peaceful reign.

A textual epilogue reveals that Elizabeth, who never married, had a child or named an heir, reigned for almost 45 years while James became the first monarch to rule both Scotland and England upon her death.

== Cast ==
- Saoirse Ronan as Mary, Queen of Scots, Elizabeth's first cousin once-removed and the Queen of Scotland.
- Margot Robbie as Elizabeth I, Mary's first cousin once-removed and the Queen of England.
- Jack Lowden as Henry Stuart, Lord Darnley, Mary's second husband.
- Joe Alwyn as Lord Robert Dudley, Elizabeth's counselor, childhood friend, and lover.
- David Tennant as John Knox, founder of the Church of Scotland.
- Guy Pearce as William Cecil, Elizabeth's advisor
- Gemma Chan as Bess of Hardwick, a friend and confidante of Elizabeth and keeper of Mary.
- Martin Compston as James Hepburn, Earl of Bothwell, Mary's third husband.
- Ismael Cruz Córdova as David Rizzio, Mary's close friend and confidant.
- Brendan Coyle as Mathew Stewart, Earl of Lennox, father of Lord Darnley.
- Ian Hart as Lord Maitland, Secretary of State of Scotland.
- Adrian Lester as Lord Randolph, Elizabeth's ambassador to Scotland.
- James McArdle as James, Earl of Moray, Regent of Scotland and Mary's illegitimate older half brother.

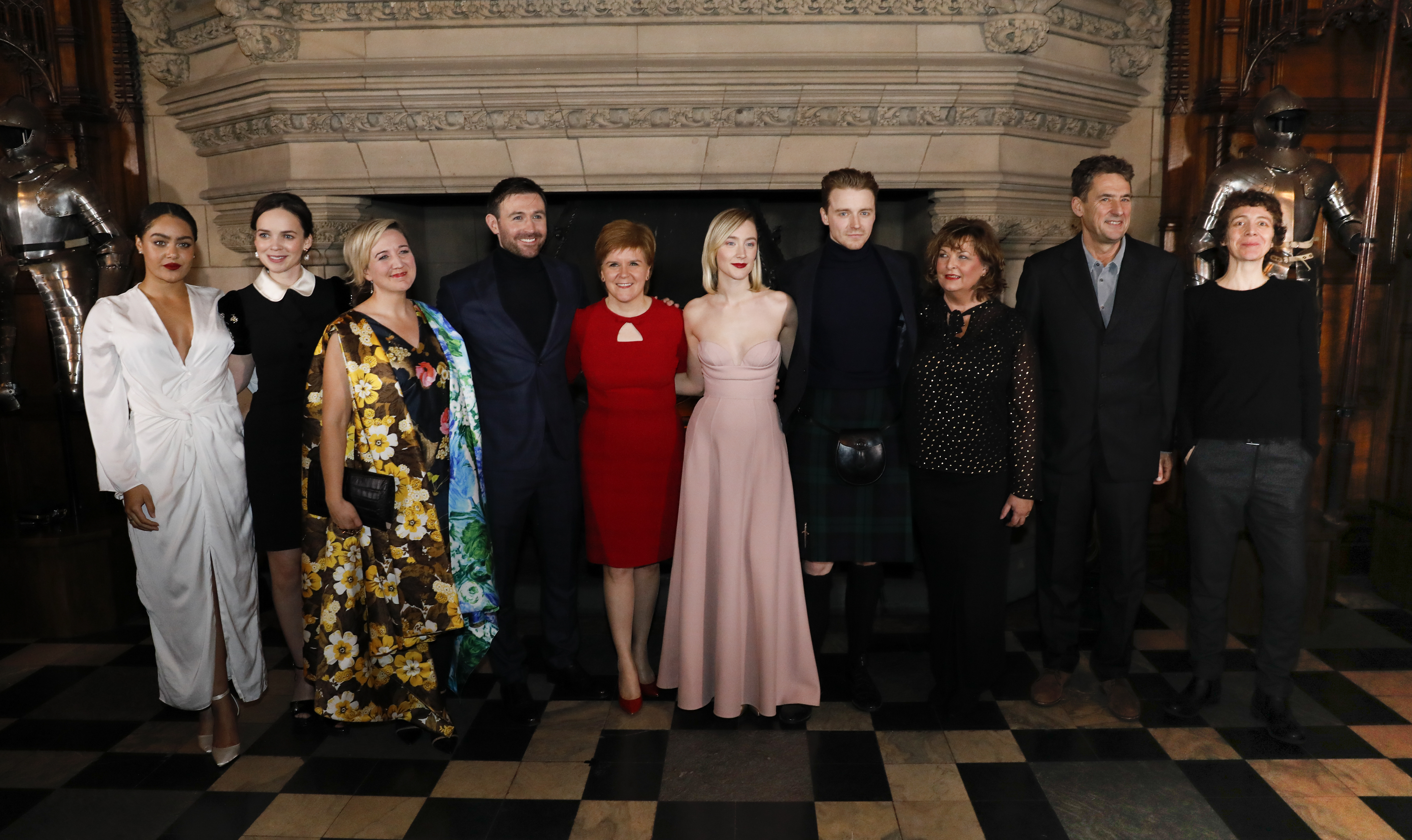
Nicola Sturgeon with the cast and crew of the film

In addition, Eileen O’Higgins, Maria-Victoria Dragus, Izuka Hoyle and Liah O'Prey are seen throughout the film as Mary's personal attendants, historically known as "The Four Marys", Mary Beaton, Mary Fleming, Mary Seton and Mary Livingston, respectively. Alex Beckett, who appears as Sir Walter Mildmay, English Chancellor of the Exchequer, died at age 35, seven months before the film's release; the film is dedicated to his memory.

The director, Josie Rourke, followed the principle of colour-blind casting. The movie portrays the Piedmontese David Rizzio, Mary's confidant, as a mixed-race person, which he was not, and the English ambassador to the Scottish Court, Lord Thomas Randolph, as a black man. Gemma Chan's character is Elizabeth Hardwick, who in real life was white. Rourke told the L.A. Times: "I was really clear, I would not direct an all-white period drama."

== Production ==
The film was originally planned to be a Scarlett Johansson vehicle, scheduled to begin shooting in mid-2007 on a $25–30 million budget. After Johansson dropped out, the film languished in development hell for several years. On 9 August 2012, it was announced that Saoirse Ronan would play the title role of Mary Stuart. It took another five years, until 21 April 2017, until it was announced that Margot Robbie was cast to play Queen Elizabeth I, and that the film was scheduled to commence principal photography in August 2017. The film based on John Guy's biography My Heart Is My Own: The Life of Mary Queen of Scots would be produced by Working Title's Tim Bevan, Eric Fellner, and Debra Hayward, and HBI Production's James Biggam. Josie Rourke was announced to direct the film from an adapted screenplay by Beau Willimon.

On 13 June 2017, Jack Lowden was announced to play Lord Darnley, while Joe Alwyn was announced to play Robert Dudley. On 22 June 2017, it was reported that Martin Compston was cast in the film to play James Hepburn, 4th Earl of Bothwell, the third husband of Stuart. On 23 June 2017, German-Romanian actress Maria-Victoria Dragus had also joined the cast to play Scottish noblewoman and childhood friend of Stuart, Mary Fleming, marking her English-language debut in film, having a minor role previously in Australian teen drama Dance Academy. On 17 August 2017, Brendan Coyle, David Tennant, and Guy Pearce joined the cast, followed by Gemma Chan the next day. On 22 August, Ismael Cruz Córdova was cast to play David Rizzio, Mary's close friend and confidant.

Focus Features handled the domestic rights while Universal Pictures handled the international distribution. The crew on the film included Academy Award winners costume designer Alexandra Byrne, hair and make-up designer Jenny Shircore and editor Chris Dickens; Emmy Award-winning production designer James Merifield; and BAFTA Award-winning cinematographer John Mathieson.

Principal photography began on 17 August 2017, in various locations around the United Kingdom, including Scotland.

== Release ==
It had its world premiere at the closing night gala of AFI Fest on 15 November 2018 in Los Angeles, CA. The film was released in the United States on 7 December 2018, and in the United Kingdom on 18 January 2019.

== Soundtrack ==
Max Richter provided a fairly-modern musical score blending with the 16th century periodic music, as Rourke gave him creative freedom to experiment on the score. The score consisted of instruments with a "female voice" such as the cor anglais—being used for Mary's voice—the viol and harp, while drums, bass and percussion were used for the male characters and their quest in the battlefield. The score, recorded at the Air Studios in London and performed by 110-piece orchestra and 12-member female choir from London Voices, released by Deutsche Grammophon on 7 December 2018.

== Reception ==
=== Box office ===
Mary Queen of Scots grossed $16.6 million in the United States and Canada, and $31.8 million in other countries, for a total worldwide gross of $48.5 million.

=== Critical response ===
On review aggregator website Rotten Tomatoes, the film holds an approval rating of 62% based on 290 reviews, with an average rating of 6.2/10. The website's critical consensus reads, "Mary Queen of Scots delivers uneven period political thrills while offering a solid showcase for the talents of its well-matched leads." On Metacritic, the film has a weighted average score of 60 out of 100, based on 47 critics, indicating "mixed or average reviews". Audiences polled by PostTrak gave the film 2.5 out of 5 stars, with 38% saying they would definitely recommend it.

Reviewers criticised the film's historicity, its plotting and its sex scenes. Emily Yoshida of New York magazine's Vulture site called it "a kind of nothing of a film. It's neither a rigorous history lesson nor a particularly interesting work of drama and character"; Shane Watson of The Telegraph called it "history porn for the Instagram generation"; while A.O. Scott of The New York Times said that "students of Scottish history may be surprised to learn that the fate of the nation was partly decided by an act of cunnilingus".

=== Historicity ===
Historians have criticised the inaccuracies of the story. There have been suggestions that Mary would not have had a Scottish accent. The five-year-old Mary was sent to France, where she grew up in the French Court. Mary and Elizabeth's letters to each other are believed to have been their only sources of communication, and they are not known to have met. The film accurately emphasises the epistolary relationship of the two queens with scenes showing the writing of letters.

Estelle Paranque, an expert on Queen Elizabeth I, told The Daily Telegraph: "It shows a friendship at first, but there was not a friendship, Elizabeth tried to be kind to her at first but Mary never saw Elizabeth as an equal. She saw her as a rival from the start." Some historians have welcomed the portrayal of the "louche lothario" Lord Darnley as bisexual.

=== Accolades ===
| Award | Date of ceremony | Category | Recipient(s) | Result | Ref. |
|---|---|---|---|---|---|
| AACTA International Awards | 14 November 2018 | Best Supporting Actress | Margot Robbie | Nominated | |
| Academy Awards | 24 February 2019 | Best Costume Design | Alexandra Byrne | Nominated | |
| Academy Awards | 24 February 2019 | Best Makeup and Hairstyling | Jenny Shircore, Marc Pilcher, and Jessica Brooks | Nominated | |
| BAFTA Awards | 10 February 2019 | Best Costume Design | Alexandra Byrne | Nominated | |
| BAFTA Awards | 10 February 2019 | Best Makeup and Hair | Jenny Shircore | Nominated | |
| BAFTA Awards | 10 February 2019 | Best Supporting Actress | Margot Robbie | Nominated | |
| Costume Designers Guild | 19 February 2019 | Excellence in Period Film | Alexandra Byrne | Nominated | |
| Critics' Choice Movie Awards | 13 January 2019 | Best Costume Design | Alexandra Byrne | Nominated | |
| Critics' Choice Movie Awards | 13 January 2019 | Best Hair and Makeup | Mary Queen of Scots | Nominated | |
| Hollywood Film Awards | 14 November 2018 | Make-Up & Hair Styling Award | Jenny Shircore, Sarah Kelly and Hannah Edwards | Honoree | |
| Hollywood Music in Media Awards | 14 November 2018 | Best Original Score – Feature Film | Max Richter | Won | |
| Make-Up Artists and Hair Stylists Guild | 16 February 2019 | Best Period and/or Character Hairstyling | Jenny Shircore, Marc Pilcher | Won | |
| Make-Up Artists and Hair Stylists Guild | 16 February 2019 | Best Period and/or Character Make-up | Jenny Shircore, Hannah Edwards, Sarah Kelly | Nominated | |
| Satellite Awards | 17 February 2019 | Best Motion Picture – Drama | Mary Queen of Scots | Nominated | |
| Satellite Awards | 17 February 2019 | Best Costume Design | Alexandra Byrne | Nominated | |
| Satellite Awards | 17 February 2019 | Best Supporting Actress | Margot Robbie | Nominated | |
| Screen Actors Guild Awards | 27 January 2019 | Outstanding Performance by a Female Actor in a Supporting Role | Margot Robbie | Nominated | |

== See also ==
- Mary of Scotland (1936), starring Katharine Hepburn and Fredric March
- Mary, Queen of Scots (1971), starring Vanessa Redgrave and Glenda Jackson
- Mary Queen of Scots (2013), starring Camille Rutherford and Sean Biggerstaff
