= Weekends (2017 film) =

- Film poster
- Directed by: Trevor Jimenez
- Written by: Trevor Jimenez
- Produced by: Jeremy Slome
- Music by: Andrew Vernon
- Production company: Past Lives Productions
- Release date: October 18, 2017 (WIFF)
- Running time: 16 minutes
- Country: United States
- Language: English

Weekends is a 2017 American animated short film. It was written and directed by Trevor Jimenez, a Canadian-born animator for Pixar, the film depicts Jimenez's own childhood experience as a child of divorced parents, who regularly spent the week living with his mother in Hamilton, Ontario while spending weekends with his father in Toronto.

Jimenez made the film through the co-op program at Pixar, which permits employees to use some company resources to make their own independent short films.

In January 2019, the film was announced as a nominee for the Academy Award for Best Animated Short Film at the 91st Academy Awards.

== Accolades ==
Award	Date of ceremony	Category	Recipient(s)	Result	Ref(s)
Academy Awards	February 24, 2019	Best Animated Short Film	Trevor Jimenez	Nominated	
Annie Awards	February 2, 2019	Best Animated Short Subject	Past Lives Productions	Won	
