= Jessica Brooks (make-up artist) =

British make-up artist

- Occupation: Make-up artist

Jessica Brooks is a British make-up artist. She was nominated for an Academy Award in the category Best Makeup and Hairstyling for the film Mary Queen of Scots.

== Selected filmography ==
- Mary Queen of Scots (2018; co-nominated with Jenny Shircore and Marc Pilcher)
