= Jane Austen Wrecked My Life =

2024 film by Laura Piani

- Theatrical release poster
- French: Jane Austen a gâché ma vie
- Directed by: Laura Piani
- Screenplay by: Laura Piani
- Produced by: Gabrielle Dumon
- Starring: Camille Rutherford; Pablo Pauly; Charlie Anson; Annabelle Lengronne; Liz Crowther; Alan Fairbairn; Lola Peploe
- Cinematography: Pierre Mazoyer
- Edited by: Floriane Allier
- Music by: Peter Von Poehl
- Production companies: Les Films Du Veyrier; Sciapode
- Distributed by: Paname Distribution
- Release dates: 9 September 2024 (TIFF); 22 January 2025 (France)
- Running time: 98 minutes
- Country: France
- Languages: French; English
- Box office: $4.4 million

Jane Austen Wrecked My Life (French: Jane Austen a gâché ma vie) is a 2024 French romantic comedy film written and directed by Laura Piani. In the film, French bookseller Agathe, after starting a first novel, surprisingly gets invited to a Jane Austen writing retreat in England which inadvertently leads to her opening her heart and becoming a published author.

The film had its world premiere at the Toronto International Film Festival on 9 September 2024. It was released in France on 22 January 2025 and in the United States by Sony Pictures Classics on 23 May 2025.

== Plot ==
Agathe Robinson is a French bookseller and aspiring novelist who works at the Shakespeare and Company bookstore in Paris and lives with her sister and her sister's young son. She cycles everywhere, as she has been nervous in cars since her parents were killed in a car accident in which she was injured. Agathe, who has been single for a few years, rejects modern dating culture and is a fan of Jane Austen's novels. She is very close to her co-worker and best friend Félix.

One evening, Agathe is inspired to write the beginning of a romance novel in English, after seeing a man's face at the bottom of her sake cup in a Chinese restaurant. Félix reads her work and secretly sends it to the Jane Austen Residency, a two-week writing retreat held in England. When they accept her, Agathe reluctantly lets Félix drive her to the Channel ferry. As she is about to board, they kiss and she departs.

Oliver, a distant descendant of Jane Austen's, picks Agathe up at the ferry terminal in England. The Residency is hosted by his elderly parents at their mansion. En route, his car breaks down and they have to spend the night in the car. Agathe insults Oliver in French while on the phone with her sister, and to her surprise, he informs her he is fluent in French. The next morning, they are rescued by an apple-cart.

At the retreat, Agathe and Oliver develop a connection, although she originally found him arrogant and haughty. She leaves messages for Félix telling him of her excitement at the kiss, but he fails to contact her. Agathe suffers from writer's block and fails to write anything during her stay at the Retreat. As she and Oliver grow closer, they go to a pub and flirt drunkenly. Back at the mansion, he puts her to bed and covers her with a blanket before departing.

The next morning, Agathe wakes to find Félix has arrived to accompany her to the Residency's annual ball, in period costume. At the ball, she dances with him and then with Oliver, before Félix cuts in again. Agathe and Félix sleep together, but she tells him the next morning that they cannot start a relationship simply because they are lonely, and sends him back to France. She cannot face the prospect of reading her work to the other authors, as she still has not written anything more at the retreat, so leaves early the next morning.

Oliver drives Agathe to the ferry and they part disconsolately; she confesses her writer's block, and he tells her that ivy and plants need ruins to make them beautiful, encouraging her to find the ruins in her life. Back in France, Agathe spends time at her parents' vacation home, which she had been unwilling to visit since their deaths. Inspired, she finishes her novel and reconnects (platonically) with Félix. The novel is accepted by a publishing house in England, and she sends a copy to Oliver, saying that she has found her ruins.

One evening, as Agathe hosts a poetry reading at the bookstore, she sees Oliver at the back of the crowd. As the poem ends, they step outside, and kiss for the first time.

== Cast ==
- Camille Rutherford as Agathe Robinson
- Pablo Pauly as Félix
- Charlie Anson as Oliver
- Annabelle Lengronne as Chéryl
- Liz Crowther as Beth, Oliver's mother
- Alan Fairbairn as Todd, Oliver's father
- Lola Peploe as Olympia
- Alice Butaud as Mona, Agathe's sister
- Frederick Wiseman as Jack Hirschmann

== Production ==
The film is written and directed by Laura Piani in her feature length debut. The film is produced by Gabrielle Dumon and financed by Canal+ and Cine+, as well as Pictanovo and Région Ile-de-France, Sofica IndeFIlms 12, French distributor Paname Distribution and international sales agent The Bureau Sales. The film is in the French and English languages.

The cast includes Camille Rutherford, Pablo Pauly, Charlie Anson and Annabelle Lengronne. Principal photography took place between 17 October and 30 November entirely in France.

== Release ==
The film premiered at the 2024 Toronto International Film Festival on 9 September. Sony Pictures Classics acquired all rights to the film in North America, Latin America, the Middle East, Eastern Europe and worldwide airlines in September 2024. It was released in France on 22 January 2025 and was released by Sony Pictures Classics in the United States on 23 May 2025.

It opened the 40th Santa Barbara International Film Festival on 4 February 2025.

== Reception ==
=== Critical response ===
On the review aggregator website Rotten Tomatoes, 82% of 118 critics' reviews are positive. The website's consensus reads: "A modern, literate and sweet riff on finding the kind of happiness that can't be found in a book, Jane Austen Wrecked My Life will make your day." Metacritic, which uses a weighted average, assigned the film a score of 74 out of 100, based on 21 critics, indicating "generally favorable" reviews.

Peter Debruge of Variety wrote, "At a time when practically the entire rom-com genre has gravitated to streaming, this bilingual theatrical offering from Sony Pictures Classics feels like the best kind of throwback."

Jourdain Searles of RogerEbert.com gave the film three out of four stars and wrote, "Jane Austen Wrecked My Life is a romantic comedy for the quiet, thoughtful lovers who yearn for the sincerity of the past."

=== Accolades ===
Award	Date of ceremony	Category	Result	Ref.
César Awards	2026	Best Female Hope (Meilleur espoir féminin)	Nominated	
Astra Midseason Movie Awards	2025	Best Indie	Nominated	
Miami Film Festival	2025	Jordan Ressler First Feature Award	Nominated	
Marrakech International Film Festival	2025	Golden Star Best Feature Film	Nominated	
