= List of most watched United States television broadcasts of 2019 =

The following is a list of most watched United States television broadcasts of 2019.

== Most watched by week ==
Broadcast (primetime only)
Week of	Title	Network	Viewers (in millions)	Ref.
January 7	NFC Playoff	Fox	33.35	
January 14	AFC Championship	CBS	53.92	
January 21	60 Minutes	CBS	11.24	
January 28	Super Bowl LIII	CBS	98.19	
February 4	61st Annual Grammy Awards	CBS	19.88	
February 11	NCIS	CBS	13.38	
February 18	91st Academy Awards	ABC	29.56	
February 25	NCIS	CBS	11.78	
March 4	The Big Bang Theory	CBS	13.00	
March 11	NCIS	CBS	12.08	
March 18	60 Minutes	CBS	10.25	
March 25	60 Minutes	CBS	12.59	
April 1	Texas Tech vs. Michigan State (NCAA)	CBS	15.84	
April 8	Texas Tech vs. Virginia (NCAA)	CBS	19.72	
April 15	NCIS	CBS	11.89	
April 22	The Big Bang Theory	CBS	11.85	
April 29	The Big Bang Theory	CBS	12.49	
May 6	The Big Bang Theory	CBS	12.59	
May 13	The Big Bang Theory	CBS	18.53	
May 20	NCIS	CBS	11.97	
May 27	NBA Finals (Game 2)	ABC	13.89	
June 3	NBA Finals (Game 3)	ABC	13.35	
June 10	NBA Finals (Game 6)	ABC	18.76	
June 17	America's Got Talent	NBC	10.01	
June 24	First Democratic debate (Night 2)	NBC	10.58	
July 1	America's Got Talent	NBC	6.82	
July 8	America's Got Talent	NBC	9.81	
July 15	America's Got Talent	NBC	9.54	
July 22	America's Got Talent	NBC	10.13	
July 29	America's Got Talent	NBC	7.98	
August 5	America's Got Talent	NBC	9.66	
August 12	America's Got Talent (Tues)	NBC	9.10	
August 19	America's Got Talent (Wed)	NBC	9.43	
August 26	America's Got Talent (Tues)	NBC	8.99	
September 2	NFL Thursday Special	NBC	22.24	

Cable
Week of	Title	Channel	Viewers (in millions)	Ref.
January 7	CFP Championship	ESPN	24.32	
January 14	America's News HQ	Fox News	3.85	
January 21	The Curse of Oak Island	History	3.63	
January 28	The Curse of Oak Island	History	3.56	
February 4	2019 State of the Union Address	Fox News	11.27	
February 11	2019 NBA All-Star Game	TNT	5.77	
February 18	The Walking Dead	AMC	4.39	
February 25	The Walking Dead	AMC	4.71	
March 4	The Walking Dead	AMC	4.83	
March 11	The Walking Dead	AMC	4.57	
March 18	Auburn vs. Kansas (NCAA)	TBS	4.62	
March 25	Purdue vs. Virginia (NCAA)	TBS	10.47	
April 1	Notre Dame vs. Baylor (NCAA)	ESPN	3.69	
April 8	Game of Thrones	HBO	11.76	
April 15	Game of Thrones	HBO	10.29	
April 22	Game of Thrones	HBO	12.02	
April 29	Game of Thrones	HBO	11.80	
May 6	Game of Thrones	HBO	12.48	
May 13	Game of Thrones	HBO	13.61	
May 20	Warriors vs. Trail Blazers (NBA)	ESPN	7.79	
May 27	Hannity (Wed)	Fox News	3.51	
June 3	Hannity (Mon)	Fox News	3.23	
June 10	Hannity (Mon)	Fox News	3.21	
June 17	Hannity (Tues)	Fox News	5.03	
June 24	First Democratic debate (Night 2)	MSNBC	6.68	
July 1	Special Report with Bret Baier (Thurs)	Fox News	4.87	
July 8	2019 Home Run Derby	ESPN	5.35	
July 15	Tucker Carlson Tonight (Wed)	Fox News	4.02	
July 22	Hannity (Wed)	Fox News	4.76	
July 29	Second Democratic debate (Night 2)	CNN	10.72	
August 5	Tucker Carlson Tonight (Wed)	Fox News	3.35	
August 12	Hannity (Wed)	Fox News	3.49	
August 19	Miami vs. Florida (NCAA)	ESPN	5.97	

Syndication (weekly average)
Week of	Title	Distributor	Viewers (in millions)	Ref.
January 7	Unknown	Unknown	Unknown	Unknown
January 14	Unknown	Unknown	Unknown	Unknown
January 21	Unknown	Unknown	Unknown	Unknown
January 28	Unknown	Unknown	Unknown	Unknown
February 4	Unknown	Unknown	Unknown	Unknown
February 11	Unknown	Unknown	Unknown	Unknown
February 18	Unknown	Unknown	Unknown	Unknown
February 25	Unknown	Unknown	Unknown	Unknown
March 4	Unknown	Unknown	Unknown	Unknown
March 11	Unknown	Unknown	Unknown	Unknown
March 18	Unknown	Unknown	Unknown	Unknown
March 25	Unknown	Unknown	Unknown	Unknown
April 1	Unknown	Unknown	Unknown	Unknown
April 8	Jeopardy!	CTD	10.09	
April 15	Jeopardy!	CTD	10.67	
April 22	Jeopardy!	CTD	11.97	
April 29	Jeopardy!	CTD	13.28	
May 6	Judge Judy	CTD	9.72	
May 13	Judge Judy	CTD	9.86	
May 20	Jeopardy!	CTD	12.42	
May 27	Jeopardy!	CTD	12.64	
June 3	Jeopardy!	CTD	10.75	
June 10	Jeopardy!	CTD	9.13	
June 17	Unknown	Unknown	Unknown	Unknown
June 24	Family Feud	CTD	9.03	
July 1	Unknown	Unknown	Unknown	Unknown
July 8	Unknown	Unknown	Unknown	Unknown
July 15	Family Feud	CTD	8.89	
July 22	Family Feud	CTD	8.47	
July 29	Family Feud	CTD	8.36	
