= Mary Queen of Scots (2013 film) =

2013 Swiss film by Thomas Imbach

- Film poster
- Directed by: Thomas Imbach
- Screenplay by: Thomas Imbach
- Based on: Maria Stuart; 1935 biography by Stefan Zweig
- Produced by: Andrea Staka; Thomas Imbach; Emilie Blezat
- Starring: Camille Rutherford
- Cinematography: Rainer Klausmann
- Edited by: Tom La Belle
- Music by: Sofia Gubaidulina
- Distributed by: Pathé
- Release date: 14 August 2013 (Locarno)
- Running time: 120 minutes
- Country: Switzerland
- Languages: English; French

Mary Queen of Scots is a 2013 Swiss period drama directed and co-written by Thomas Imbach. It is his first film in the English and French languages, starring the bilingual French actress Camille Rutherford. The film portrays the inner life of Mary, the Queen of Scotland. The film is based on the Austrian novelist Stefan Zweig's 1935 biography, Mary Stuart, a long-term bestseller in Germany and France but out of print in the UK and the US for decades until 2010. The film was first screened at the 2013 International Film Festival Locarno and was later shown at the 2013 Toronto International Film Festival.

== Plot ==
Mary, Queen of Scots, awaits her execution by order of Queen Elizabeth I of England. Mary composes a letter to Elizabeth, to whom she feels a close kinship as her cousin and a fellow female monarch. Through flashback, Mary narrates to Elizabeth the events of her life, starting from her birth in Scotland to the French Mary of Guise, who sends her to France as a child for her protection.

Mary is raised in the French court, where she had for companions her Scottish ladies Mary Beaton, Mary Seton, Mary Fleming and Mary Livingston, as well as the Italian musician David Rizzio. Upon reaching adulthood Mary is married to the Dauphin, Francis, who becomes King of France when his father dies. News arrives that Queen Mary I of England has died and her sister, Elizabeth, has become Queen despite her official status as a bastard. Mary is aware of her own legitimate claim to the English throne; although she writes to Elizabeth promising not to challenge her, she insists on using the English coat of arms and the title "Queen of France, Scotland and England".

After Francis's early death, Mary returns to Scotland with her ladies and Rizzio. There, she is treated with suspicion and scepticism by her half-brother, Lord Moray, the Protestant clergyman John Knox and other Scottish lords. Mary struggles to ingratiate herself to them, but ends up isolating herself further by relying on Rizzio for political advice, marrying Englishman Darnley without the Lords' consent, and supporting the controversial Scottish border Lord Bothwell. Mary's love for Darnley fades when she learns of his extremism in pursuing the English throne; Mary has strong affection for Elizabeth, and wants to be her heir instead of usurping her.

Darnley conspires with Moray and the Scottish Lords to murder Rizzio in cold blood in front of a heavily pregnant Mary. Afterwards Mary begins to see visions of Rizzio, who warns her of worse things to come. Mary gives birth to her and Darnley's heir, James, but she is effectively separated from Darnley and has a new passion for Bothwell, with whom she has an affair. Soon afterward Darnley is killed in a gunpowder explosion, and Mary marries Bothwell because she is pregnant with his child. The marriage is heavily protested, with the Scottish Lords taking up arms against Mary and Bothwell. Eventually Mary and Bothwell are outnumbered, and Bothwell flees from Scotland while Mary travels to England in the hopes of getting protection from Elizabeth. Instead, Elizabeth has Mary incarcerated, and decades later Mary is executed by order of the cousin she has never met.

== Cast ==
- Camille Rutherford as Mary, Queen of Scots
- Sean Biggerstaff as Bothwell
- Aneurin Barnard as Darnley
- Edward Hogg as Moray
- Mehdi Dehbi as Rizzio
- Tony Curran as Knox
- Clive Russell as Douglas
- Ian Hanmore as Ruthven
- Joana Preiss as Marie de Guise
- Bruno Todeschini as De Croc
- Roxane Duran as Mary Seton
- Gaia Weiss as Mary Fleming

== Reception ==
Eric Kohn, Indiewire: "Mary Queen of Scots features an appealing reworking of familiar contents: while in many ways a traditional period drama, its time-shifting structure and dreamlike narration manages to critique the very strictures of the genre."

Sandrine Marques, Le Monde: "Thomas Imbach adapts Marie Stuart by Stefan Zweig. The encounter between the director's work and that of the Austro-Hungarian writer is obvious from the tortuous currents that run through his films. But where it was expected that madness would infuse each shot with the same dark matter from which the novel is made, Thomas Imbach chooses the stylistic and narrative blueprint. It is through skillfully composed and superbly illuminated shots that he tells the story of this Queen of Scotland, with a tragic destiny."

== See also ==
- Mary of Scotland (1936), starring Katharine Hepburn and Fredric March
- Mary, Queen of Scots (1971), starring Vanessa Redgrave and Glenda Jackson
- Mary Queen of Scots (2018), starring Saoirse Ronan and Margot Robbie
