= The Book of Solutions =

2023 comedy-drama film

- Theatrical release poster
- French: Le Livre des solutions
- Directed by: Michel Gondry
- Written by: Michel Gondry
- Produced by: Georges Bermann
- Starring: Pierre Niney; Blanche Gardin; Françoise Lebrun; Frankie Wallach; Camille Rutherford; Vincent Elbaz
- Cinematography: Laurent Brunet
- Edited by: Élise Fievet
- Music by: Étienne Charry
- Production company: Partizan Films
- Distributed by: The Jokers
- Release dates: 21 May 2023 (Cannes); 13 September 2023 (France)
- Running time: 102 minutes
- Country: France
- Language: French
- Box office: $3.6 million

The Book of Solutions (French: Le Livre des solutions) is a 2023 French comedy-drama film written and directed by Michel Gondry.

It had its world premiere in the Directors' Fortnight section at the 76th Cannes Film Festival on 21 May 2023. It was released in France on 13 September 2023.

== Premise ==
Marc is a director whose life and career are in upheaval. He takes his film crew to continue filming the small village in the Cévennes where his aunt, Denise, lives. There, Marc rediscovers his creativity and is full of ideas. He has so many ideas that he decides to write the Book of Solutions, a book full of advice.

== Cast ==
- Pierre Niney as Marc Becker
- Blanche Gardin as Charlotte
- Françoise Lebrun as Denise
- Frankie Wallach as Sylvia
- Camille Rutherford as Gabrielle
- Mourad Boudaoud as Carlos
- Vincent Elbaz as Max Laporte
- Sting as himself
- Sacha Bourdo as the sound engineer
- Christian Prat as André
- Michèle Gary as Rolande
- Corinne Mariotto as Nicole
- Nelly Pulicani as Evelyne
- Ambre Gollut as the chief executive
- Patrick Mollo as the orchestra conductor
- Jacques Mazeran as Jacques
- Mama Prassinos as Mireille
- Dominique Valadié as Martine
- Justin Houser as Sting's sound engineer

== Production ==
The Book of Solutions is loosely based on Gondry's experience during the troubled production of his 2013 film Mood Indigo. In October 2021, Pierre Niney was announced in the lead role of a new comedy-drama film directed by Michel Gondry. Niney called it a dream of his to work with Gondry, who he first met after Gondry agreed to accompany him as his "godfather" to a pre-César party in 2012. The Book of Solutions is Gondry's first feature film since Microbe & Gasoline, released in 2015. It was produced by Georges Bermann through his production company Partizan Films.

In May 2022, the film was presented at the Marché du Film in Cannes to be acquired by distributors around the world.

Filming began on 6 June 2022. It took place in the Gard department, including the communes of Le Vigan and Saint-Sauveur-Camprieu. Shooting also took place in Villemagne (Aude) and Meyrueis (Lozère), and in Paris.

== Release ==
The film was selected to be screened in the Directors' Fortnight section of the 76th Cannes Film Festival, where it had its world premiere on 21 May 2023. The film was theatrically released in France on 13 September 2023 by The Jokers. It was also invited at the 28th Busan International Film Festival in 'Icon' section and was screened on 7 October 2023. International sales are handled by Kinology.

== Reception ==
On Rotten Tomatoes, the film holds an approval rating of 81% based on 26 reviews, with an average rating of 6.8/10. On Metacritic, the film has a weighted average score of 65 out of 100, based on 7 critic reviews, indicating "generally favorable" reviews. On AlloCiné, the film received an average rating of 3.8 out of 5 stars, based on 33 reviews from French critics.
