= Iamhere =

2019 comedy drama film

#Iamhere
- Theatrical release poster
- Directed by: Éric Lartigau
- Written by: Thomas Bidegain; Éric Lartigau
- Produced by: Sidonie Dumas; Alice Girard; Edouard Weil
- Starring: Alain Chabat; Bae Doona; Blanche Gardin; Ilian Bergala; Jules Sagot; Camille Rutherford; Delphine Gleize
- Cinematography: Laurent Tangy
- Edited by: Juliette Welfling
- Music by: Evgueni Galperine; Sacha Galperine
- Production companies: Rectangle Productions; Gaumont; France 2 Cinéma; Belga Productions; Quarante 12 Films
- Distributed by: Gaumont Distribution
- Release dates: October 5, 2019 (Busan); February 5, 2020 (France)
- Running time: 97 minutes
- Countries: France; Belgium
- Languages: French; Korean

#Iamhere (French: #jesuislà) is a 2019 comedy drama film. The film stars Alain Chabat, Bae Doona, Blanche Gardin, Ilian Bergala, Jules Sagot, Camille Rutherford and Delphine Gleize.

== Cast ==
- Alain Chabat as Stéphane Lucas
- Bae Doona as Soo
- Blanche Gardin as Suzanne
- Ilian Bergala as David Lucas
- Jules Sagot as Ludo Lucas
- Camille Rutherford as Jane
- Delphine Gleize as Catherine
- Lazare Lartigau as Hugo
- Lee Myeong-ja as old lady
- Kim Ja-guem as waitress
- Kang Hyeon-joong as chef
- Myteen as themselves

== Release ==
It premiered at the 2019 Busan International Film Festival.
