= Trevor Jimenez =

Canadian animator

Trevor Jimenez is a Canadian animator at Pixar. He is noted for his 2017 short film Weekends, which was a nominee for the Academy Award for Best Animated Short Film at the 91st Academy Awards.

== Early life ==
Jimenez was born in Hamilton, Ontario, Canada. After his parents divorced he spent weekdays with his Filipino mother and weekends with his father, an experience that was depicted in Weekends (2017). The short film was produced through the co-op program at Pixar, which permits employees to use company resources to make their own independent short films.

== Career ==
Jimenez has worked as a story artist on films such as Ice Age: Dawn of the Dinosaurs (2009), Rio (2011), The Lorax (2012), Finding Dory (2016), Coco (2017) and Soul (2020). Following this, he joined the Pixar Senior Creative Team in 2022, and became one of the two directors for episode 6 of the 2025 limited streaming series Win or Lose (while also storyboarding for episodes 5 and 7).

Jimenez will direct the animated film Ghost Market (2028), based on Asian myths about interactions between the living and the dead.
