= Black Sheep (2018 film) =

2018 short documentary film by Ed Perkins

- Film poster
- Directed by: Ed Perkins
- Produced by: Simon Chinn; Jonathan Chinn
- Cinematography: Michael Paleodimos
- Edited by: Ed Perkins
- Music by: Tom Barnes
- Production company: Lightbox Entertainment
- Distributed by: Guardian Documentaries
- Release dates: May 1, 2018 (Hot Docs); October 26, 2018 (internet)
- Running time: 26 minutes
- Country: United Kingdom
- Language: English

Black Sheep is a 2018 British short documentary film about black teenager Cornelius Walker and his family moving out of London only to meet with more racism in an Essex estate run by a racist gang. It was released by the British news organization The Guardian.

== Reception ==
=== Critical response ===
Black Sheep has an approval rating of 100% on review aggregator website Rotten Tomatoes, based on five reviews.

=== Accolades ===
- Nominated: Academy Award for Best Documentary (Short Subject) - 91st Academy Awards
