= Paul Bloch =

American publicist (1939–2018)

- Born: July 17, 1939; Brooklyn, New York City, U.S.
- Died: May 25, 2018 (aged 78); Los Angeles, California, U.S.
- Education: University High School
- Alma mater: University of California, Los Angeles
- Occupation: Publicist

Paul Bloch (July 17, 1939 – May 25, 2018) was an American publicist. He was the chairman of Rogers & Cowan, and he represented many celebrities.

== Early life ==
Bloch was born on July 17, 1939, in Brooklyn, New York City, New York. He was educated at the University High School in Los Angeles, and he graduated from the University of California, Los Angeles (UCLA), where he earned a bachelor's degree in Political Science in 1962.

== Career ==
Bloch began his career at Rogers & Cowan in 1961. He initially worked in the mailroom, and later became the head of the music department. By the time of his death, he was chairman. Over the course of his career, he represented many celebrities, including Victoria Beckham, Kevin Costner, Tom Cruise, Farrah Fawcett, Barry Gibb, Anthony Hopkins, Michael Keaton, Eddie Murphy, Nick Nolte, Lisa Marie Presley, Diana Ross, Sharon Stone, and John Travolta.

Bloch received the Les Mason Award from the International Cinematographers Guild in 1991. He was the namesame of the Paul Bloch Salad at The Palm.

== Death ==
Bloch died on May 25, 2018, at Cedars-Sinai Medical Center in Los Angeles.
