= Michael Eames =

British visual effects artist

Michael "Mike" Eames
- Occupation: Visual effects artist

Michael "Mike" Eames is a British visual effects artist. He was nominated for an Academy Award in the category Best Visual Effects for the film Christopher Robin.

== Selected filmography ==
- Christopher Robin (2018; co-nominated with Chris Lawrence, Theo Jones and Chris Corbould)
