= Marc Pilcher =

British makeup artist (1967–2021)

- Born: Marc Elliot Pilcher; December 1967; Chatham, Kent, England
- Died: 3 October 2021 (aged 53); London, England
- Education: London College of Fashion
- Occupations: Hair stylist; make-up artist

Marc Elliot Pilcher (December 1967 – 3 October 2021) was a British hair stylist and make-up artist. In 2021, he jointly won the Primetime Emmy Award for Outstanding Hairstyling for work on the series Bridgerton. He was also nominated in 2018 for the Academy Award for Best Makeup and Hairstyling for work on the film Mary Queen of Scots. He had hair and make up styling jobs on films which included: Beauty and the Beast, Downton Abbey, My Week with Marilyn, The Invisible Woman, and The Young Victoria.

Pilcher tested positive for COVID-19, which led to his death weeks after his Emmy win in September 2021. He was double-vaccinated and had no underlying health conditions, as confirmed to Variety by his agency, Curtis Brown. Pilcher was 53.
