= Camille Rutherford =

French actress

- Born: Paris, France
- Education: Conservatoire de Paris
- Occupation: Actress
- Years active: 2010-present

Camille Rutherford is a British-French film actress. She was nominated for the César Award for Best Female Revelation in 2021.

== Early life ==
Camille Rutherford was born in 1990 in Paris. Her mother is French, and her father is British, from the northeast of England. Rutherford grew up in Clermont-Ferrand. After attending Collège Massillon in Clermont-Ferrand, Rutherford attended the Conservatoire à rayonnement régional de Clermont-Ferrand. In 2008, Rutherford attended the Conservatoire national supérieur d'art dramatique, part of the Conservatoire de Paris, graduating in 2011.

== Career ==
Her first lead role was in director Nicolas Klotz's 2011 film Low Life. She had the lead role of Mary, Queen of Scots in the 2013 film Mary Queen of Scots. She also appeared in Blue is the Warmest Colour in 2013. In 2016, she had a role in Jacqueline Argentine.

She appeared in Éric Lartigau's film Iamhere. She was nominated for 2021's César Award for Best Female Revelation for her role in Felicità. That year she could be seen in Bertrand Mandico's film After Blue.

She was in the 2023 Michel Gondry directed film The Book of Solutions. She appeared as journalist Zoe Solidor in the film Anatomy of a Fall.

In 2024, had a lead role in Jane Austen Wrecked My Life. In May 2024, she was cast in Elsewhere at Night (Ailleurs la nuit), directed by Marianne Metivier. She portrays Mathilde, the sister of Aramis in The Three Musketeers: Milady.

== Partial filmography ==
Year	Title	Role	Notes
2011	Low Life	Carmen	
2013	Mary Queen of Scots	Mary, Queen of Scots	
2013	Blue is the Warmest Colour	Camille	
2016	Jacqueline Argentine	Jacqueline	
2019	Iamhere	Jane	
2020	Felicitià	Chloe	
2021	After Blue	Kate's sister	
2023	The Book of Solutions	Gabrielle	
2023	Anatomy of a Fall	Zoe	
2023	The Three Musketeers: Milady	Mathilde	
2024	Dragon Dilatation		
2024	Jane Austen Wrecked My Life	Agathe	
2024	Paris Has Fallen	Théa	
2025	Nino	Camille	
2025	Elsewhere at Night (Ailleurs la nuit)	Marie	
