= Cycling in Greater Manchester =

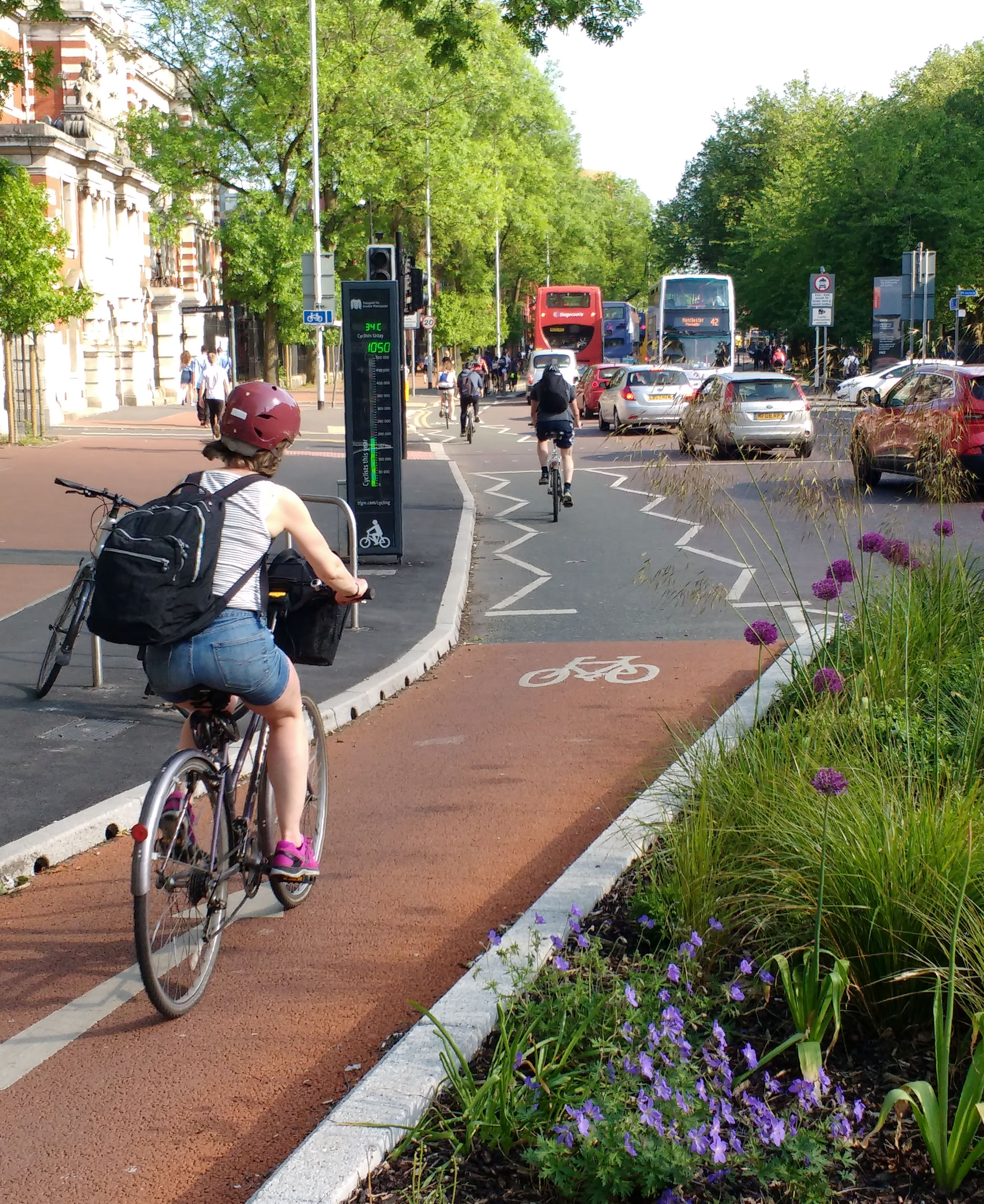
Cyclists using the cycle lane on Oxford Road, passing an electronic bicycle counter

Cycling for transport and leisure enjoys popularity in Greater Manchester, and the city also plays a major role in British cycle racing. The Bee Network was launched in 2018. The University of Manchester is home to the Manchester Cycling Lab. In recent years, Greater Manchester has seen substantial investment in active travel, including the development of the Bee Network, the introduction of CYCLOPS junctions, and the expansion of segregated cycle routes across the city‑region. Cycling levels have continued to rise, supported by neighbourhood‑scale schemes, improved crossings, and the creation of traffic‑free greenways linking parks, waterways and residential areas.

Since 2014, Manchester has been upgrading many key thoroughfares into the city centre to include dedicated cycle lanes that are segregated from buses, including along Oxford Road and the Chorlton Cycleway, as well as reconfiguring major junctions and creating low-traffic neighbourhoods.

== Utility cycling ==
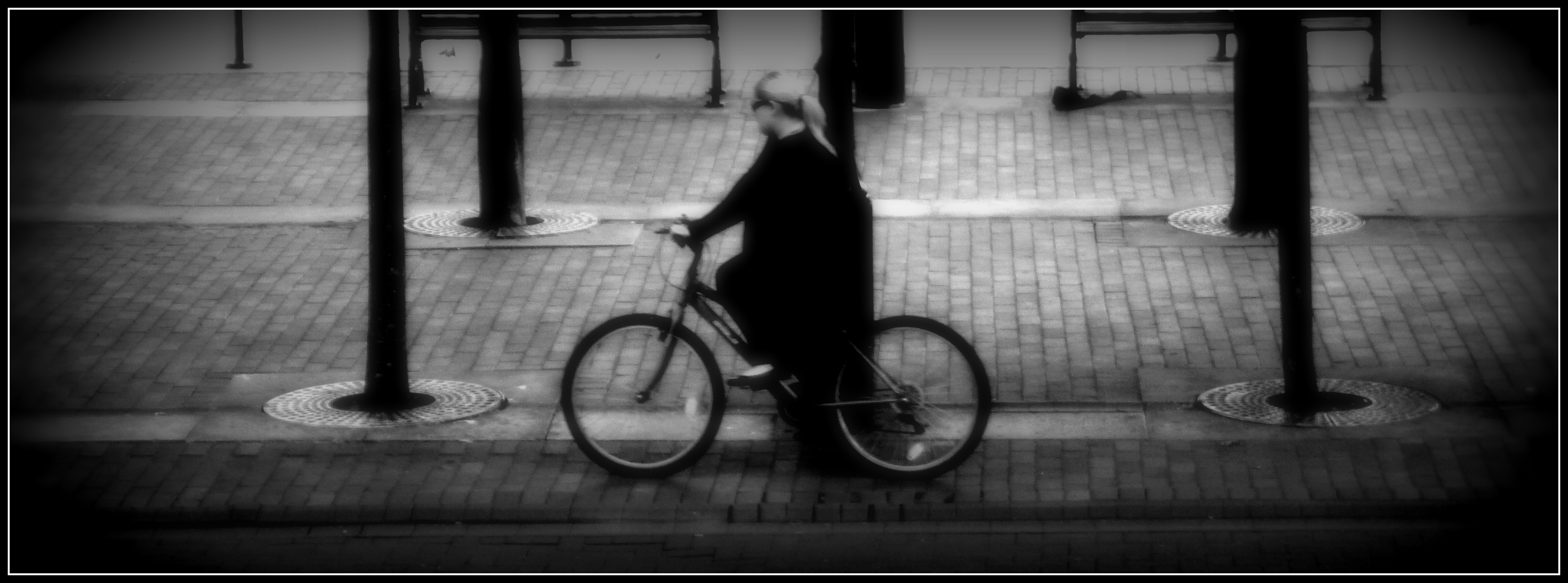
A cyclist at Salford Quays

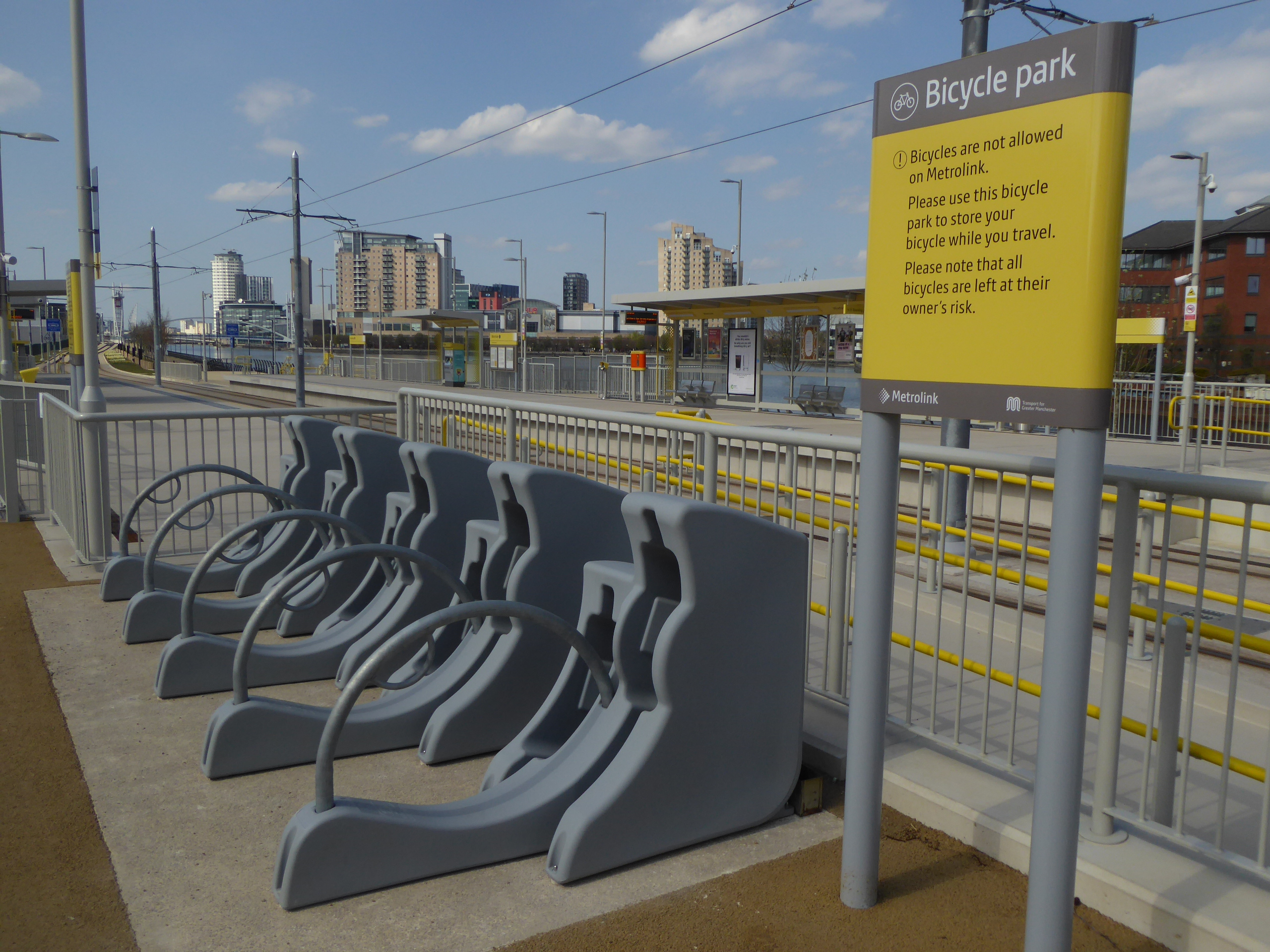
A bicycle park at a Trafford Metrolink station

Cycling is a significant mode of transport for people commuting to work in Manchester. Current figures suggest that around 2% of all trips in Manchester are made by bike (2023).

Transport for Greater Manchester (TfGM) aspires to "achieve at least a 300% increase in the levels of cycling across the city region by 2025" and has produced a corresponding cycling strategy.

Greater Manchester Cycling Campaign is a volunteer-run group. Another pressure group in the city-region is Walk Ride GM, which advocates for better environments and facilities for pedestrians as well as cyclists.

The Manchester Cycle Forum enables people with an interest in cycling to meet councillors and council staff from Manchester City Council, staff from TfGM, and representatives from various cycling and transport organisations to discuss cycling-related issues in the city. Meetings take place quarterly.

Manchester Friends of the Earth coordinates the 'Love Your Bike' campaign, which promotes cycling as an environmentally friendly mode of transport. One of its activities is the 'Bike Friday' scheme, a series of monthly rides from outer districts into the city centre. These rides aim to encourage commuters to cycle to work, benefiting from the added safety and sociability of travelling in a group.

In 2015 Manchester was described as a "terrible cycling city" by Helen Pidd, the North of England editor of The Guardian.

Chris Boardman was appointed Cycling and Walking Commissioner for Greater Manchester in 2017 by mayor Andy Burnham. His remit includes overseeing projects to enhance the region's cycling network and increase the number of people who travel by bike. He was replaced by Dame Sarah Storey in 2022.

=== Bicycle hire ===
In June 2017, Mobike launched a bicycle-sharing scheme across the city, allowing users to hire bikes via its app. Riders paid a deposit and were then charged 50p per 30 minutes. The scheme was suspended in September 2018 due to the high level of vandalism affecting many of the bicycles.

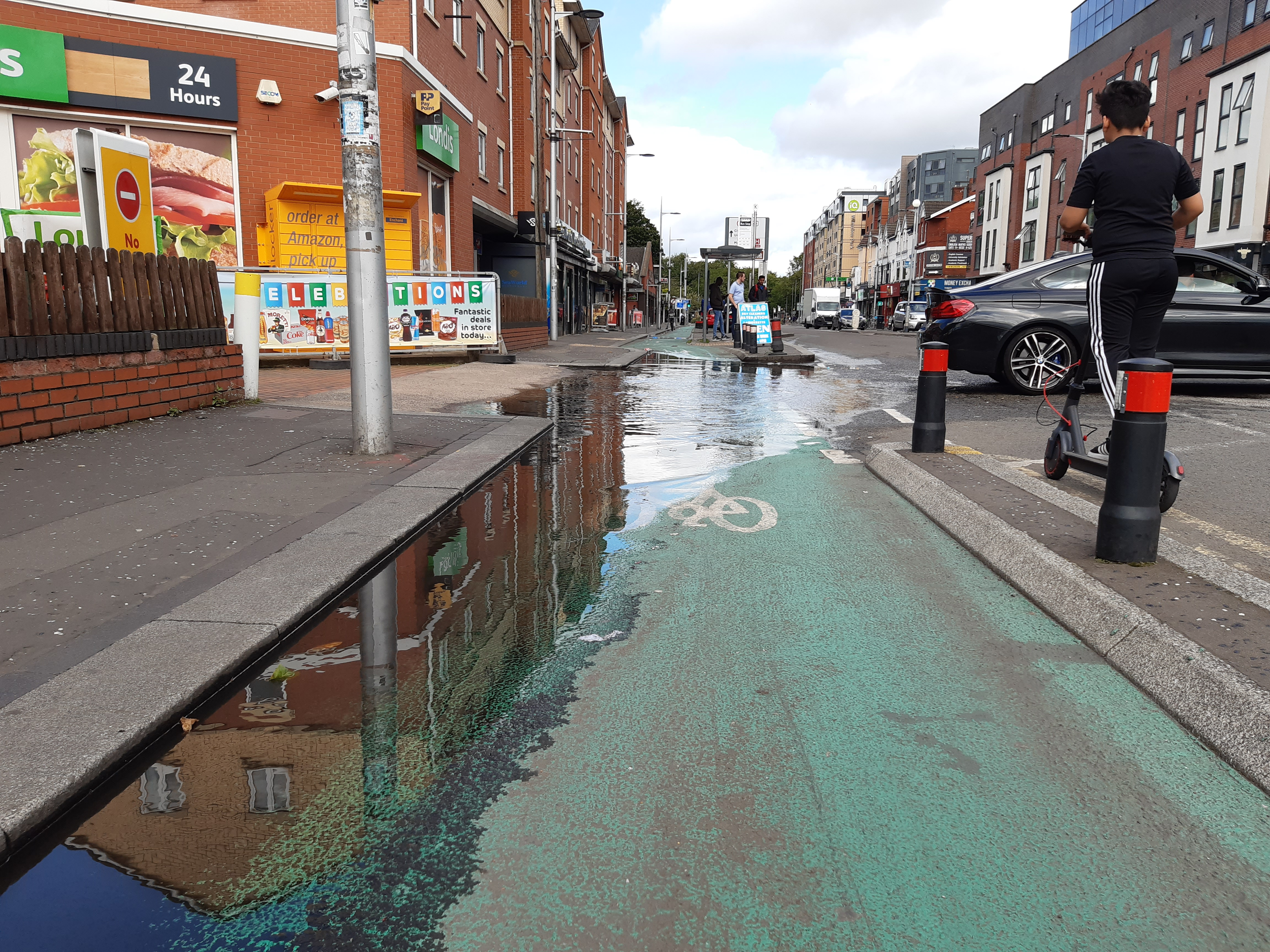
A puddle in the northbound bicycle lane along the Curry Mile

A 2013 study by TfGM into the possibility of a bike-hire scheme suggested that an initial scheme should focus on a concentrated area at the centre of the conurbation, including Manchester city centre, Salford Quays, Oxford Road, and Hulme.

The new bike-hire scheme, known as Beryl, began in November 2021 as a public trial with 250 cycles on Oxford Road. By the summer of 2022, the scheme planned to have 1,500 bikes across Manchester, Trafford and Salford. It will have 200 stations, with around 198,000 residents within a 5-minute walk, and stations spaced roughly 300–500 metres (980–1,640 ft) apart. The stations contain stands for placing the bikes but are not secure docking points. It scheme operates on a pay-as-you-ride basis, with the back wheel locked when stationary. At launch, mechanical hire cycles cost 50p to unlock and 5p per minute, while e-bikes cost £1 to unlock and 10p per minute to ride.

The Beryl bike-hire scheme was hit by a wave of vandalism during 2023, with damage taking 564 of the 943 bikes off the roads and leaving only 379 available across Manchester, Salford, and Trafford.

The city was the first to receive a "Brompton Bike Hire" facility, located at Piccadilly station.

== The Bee Network ==
The Bee Network is a project launched by TfGM with the aim of connecting every area and community in Greater Manchester, making it easy, safe and attractive for people to travel on foot or by bike for everyday trips. A large focus of the project is cycling, and TfGM, in partnership with local authorities, is investing in a range of measures to encourage it, including new cycling infrastructure, a cycle-hire scheme, cycle hubs and training courses to help people learn to ride.

== Cycle routes and cycling infrastructure ==
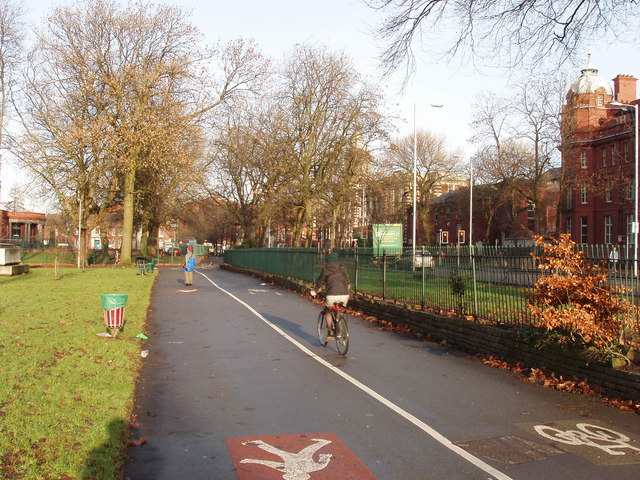
The cycleway in Whitworth Park as of 2009 (since moved to the road adjacent to the park)

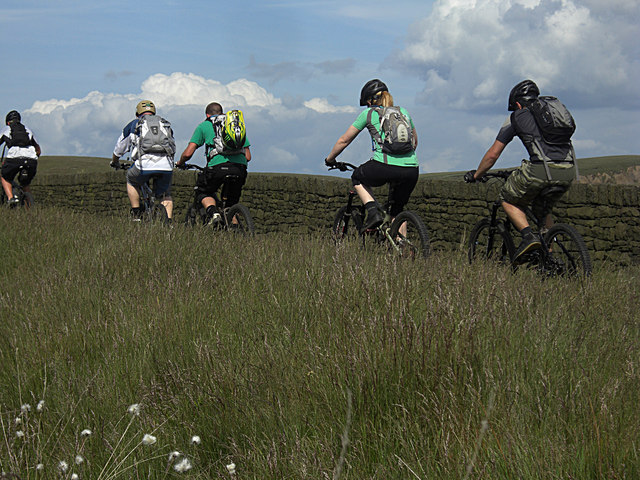
Cyclists on the Pennine Bridleway

Major dedicated cycle routes in Greater Manchester, or passing through areas of the city, include:

- National Cycle Route 6
- National Cycle Route 55
- Fallowfield Loop (National Cycle Route 60)
- Trans Pennine Trail (National Cycle Route 62)
- National Cycle Route 66

Regional Cycle Route 85 deviates from National Cycle Route 6 at Whalley Range to link the city centre with Wythenshawe and Manchester Airport. Other numbered regional routes include Route 82 (better known as Bridgewater Way) and Route 86 (which follows the River Medlock).

== Future cycling infrastructure proposals ==
=== School Streets ===
A pair of digital bicycle counters installed on either side of the road near Whitworth Park in September 2016 had recorded a combined total of 1,000,000 bike journeys by late 2017.

In 2019 TfGM began developing a "Bee Network" of cycle routes across Greater Manchester.

As part of the segregated Chorlton Cycleway, the UK's first CYCLOPS junction was completed in July 2020 in Hulme.

=== Low Traffic Neighbourhoods ===
Modal filters across Greater Manchester have been in place for over 40 years.

The Levenshulme and Burnage Active Neighbourhood was partially completed in 2023 with a series of filters throughout the neighbourhood to help encourage active travel trips.

=== CyanLines ===
CyanLines is a walking and cycling initiative launched in September 2025 to create a 100-mile (160 km) network of connected parks, rivers, canals and traffic‑free routes across Manchester and Salford. The project aims to link existing green and blue infrastructure—such as Castlefield Viaduct, Mayfield Park and the River Irwell—with new paths and crossings, improving access to nature and expanding opportunities for active travel. Four initial routes totalling 15.5 miles (24.9 km) were introduced at launch, with further expansion proposed over the following decade.

== Regular events ==
The Manchester Sky Ride, a mass participation bike ride, was held in August every year, and became the HSBC UK City Ride from July 2017. The Great Manchester Cycle is a similar large-scale event held during the summer in recent years. A Critical Mass event takes place on the last Friday of every month, starting by Manchester Central Library. A naked bike ride is held annually early in the summer, along with a non-corporate DIY cycling festival, North West Velofest.

There are over 200 cycle clubs in Greater Manchester, catering to many styles of cycling, with Manchester Wheelers' Club being one of the most well-known.

Well known sportives include the "Manchester 100", a choice of 100 mile or 100 km rides to the south of the city, and the "Tour de Manc", a 100-mile ride through all the ten boroughs.

=== History ===
A combined velodrome and athletics stadium, Fallowfield Stadium opened in 1892. The cycling track was 509 yards in circumference and was used for the 1934 British Empire Games. It was demolished in 1994.
