= Susan Matheson =

South African costume designer

- Citizenship: South Africa
- Occupation(s): Costume designer, Fashion designer

Susan Matheson is a costume designer. She designed costumes for the films, The Kingdom, Friday Night Lights, Blue Crush, Crazy/Beautiful, Honey, Panic and Best Laid Plans. She has designed for three films starring Will Ferrell, including Step Brothers, Semi-Pro, and Talladega Nights: The Ballad of Ricky Bobby. She designed costumes for the film Couples Retreat (2009).

== Biography ==
Susan Matheson grew up in Cape Town, South Africa. Susan received her bachelor's degree from Vassar College and her BFA from Parsons School of Design where she received the "Designer of the year" award as well as design awards from Nike, Inc. and Bob Mackie. Upon graduation, she went to work for Mattel Toys designing for both Barbie and Disney.

Since then she has gone on to design costumes for both film and theater.

Susan has collaborated with performance artists Ron Athey, Juliana Snapper and Nicole Blackman. She collaborated most recently with Juliana Snapper and composer Andrew Infanti in May 2009 on the world's first underwater opera You Who Will Emerge From the Flood at the Victoria Baths in Manchester, England.
