= You Who Will Emerge From the Flood =

2009 underwater opera by Juliana Snapper

You Who Will Emerge From The Flood is the world's first underwater opera.

It premiered at the Victoria Baths in Manchester, England in May 2009. It was created by performance artist and opera singer Juliana Snapper and composer Andrew Infanti. Costumes were designed by Susan Matheson. This site-specific work has since been staged in the U.S., Slovenia, England, Portugal, Poland, Switzerland, and Australia.
