= CyanLines =

Walking and cycling network in Greater Manchester, England

- Length: 19.2 mi (31 km) (as of September 2026); 100 mi (160 km) (proposed and approximate)
- Location: Greater Manchester, England
- Use: Walking, cycling
- Season: All year
- Website: cyanlines.com

CyanLines is an initiative to create a 100-mile (160 km) network of parks, rivers, canals, and walkways across Greater Manchester, England. It was launched in September 2025 with four pilot routes, designated C1 to C4, totalling 15.5 miles (25 km), covering locations in both Manchester and Salford city centres. A fifth route, CL5, was announced in September 2026.

The project's stated aims include linking existing green and blue spaces, such as Castlefield Viaduct, Mayfield Park, and the River Irwell, with new routes and infrastructure to support access to nature, active travel, and ecological connectivity.

== History ==
CyanLines was co-founded by Tom Bloxham, chairman of the property development company Urban Splash, and Pete Swift, chief executive of the architecture practice Planit. The name reflects the initiative's aim of bringing together blue (water) and green (natural) spaces. It was launched on 10 September 2025 at Aviva Studios in Manchester, with support from Manchester City Council and the Greater Manchester Combined Authority.

At the launch, four pilot routes totalling 15.5 miles (24.9 km) were revealed, covering locations in both Manchester and Salford city centres, and designated C1 to C4. These early routes were intended to demonstrate how underused urban areas could be repurposed to create continuous corridors for biodiversity, public access, and active travel. Proposed connections included established sites such as Castlefield Viaduct, Mayfield Park, and New Islington Marina, alongside smaller parks and planned developments including Victoria North and Holt Town.

On the first anniversary of the project, in September 2026, CyanLines announced a fifth route, known as CL5, a 3.7-mile (6 km) circular route linking Manchester city centre with the Etihad Campus and Co-op Live. The route was co‑designed with partners including the council, Manchester City Football Club, Co‑op Live, and the Canal & River Trust, and aims to improve access between the city centre and major venues.

== Partners ==
Public-sector involved in the CyanLines initiative include Manchester City Council, Salford City Council, and the Greater Manchester Combined Authority. These organisations contribute to the project's strategic direction and its alignment with regional planning and policy frameworks.

Private-sector participants include developers and design firms such as Urban Splash, Planit, Allied London, Bruntwood, Far East Consortium, Landsec, Property Alliance Group, and Renaker. Their roles relate to development activity and design work associated with areas included in the proposed network.

In the charitable sector, the National Trust and Factory International are listed as supporters of the initiative. Their involvement relates to cultural, environmental, and community‑focused aspects of the project.

== Funding and governance ==
CyanLines receives funding from a combination of public and philanthropic bodies. Confirmed contributors include Natural England and the National Lottery Heritage Fund's Nature Towns and Cities programme, which support projects related to green and blue infrastructure and community‑based environmental activity.

As of September 2025, CyanLines is in the process of establishing a dedicated not-for-profit organisation, potentially a community interest company or charity, to manage governance, broaden partnerships, and secure long-term funding for the initiative.

== Pilot routes ==
The first four CyanLines routes stretching a total of 15.5 miles (25 km), include:

- CL1 – Victoria station and NOMA to Queens Park – the Irk Valley explorer
- CL2 – Mayfield, New Islington and Ancoats Loop – from marina to new city park
- CL3 – St Peter's Square to Whitworth Park – walking the knowledge corridor
- CL4 – Irwell and Castlefield Loop – Romans, rivers, and a park in the sky

== See also ==
- Cycling in Greater Manchester
