= Juliana Snapper =

American opera singer and performance artist

Juliana Snapper is an American contemporary opera singer and performance artist whose work combines experimental vocal techniques, live performance, computer-generated electronics (without the use of A.I.), installation, and interdisciplinary collaboration —working with leading figures in the contemporary art world such as performance artist Ron Athey, poet Eileen Myles, composer Philippe Manoury, and researcher in computer science/electronic music Miller Puckette.

== Education ==
Snapper studied vocal performance at the Oberlin Conservatory of Music, then pursued musicology and experimental music at the University of California, San Diego notably with George Lewis.

== Career ==
Snapper’s work situates itself between contemporary opera, performance art, experimental theatre, and real-time electronic music. Her performances have treated the voice as both a musical instrument and a physical element of performance. In 2012, the Los Angeles Times described her as an avant-garde opera singer whose work sought to challenge conventional ideas of opera and singing. According to the HuffPost, she "combines radical vocal techniques, improvisation and collaboration to push the operatic medium to its extreme limits. "

=== The Judas Cradle ===
Snapper collaborated with performance artist Ron Athey on The Judas Cradle, a performance work developed between 2004 and 2008. The work was presented in the United States and Europe, including performances in Los Angeles, New York, Manchester, and Ljubljana.

The Performa (performance festival) 2005 staging in New York sparked contemporary coverage highlighting the unique uses of vocal and physical performance techniques by Athey and Snapper.

Amelia Jones commented on The Judas Cradle in The Drama Review in 2006, examining the collaboration in relation to the body, voice, performance and the disruption of conventional bodily and theatrical forms.

=== Five Fathoms Deep My Father Lies ===
Snapper designed a series of underwater vocal performances under the title Five Fathoms Deep My Father Lies. The project investigated the relationship between vocal production, water, and bodily vibration and was presented in aquatic environments.

In March 2008, Snapper premiered Five Fathoms Opera Project at P.S.1 Contemporary Art Center/MoMA in New York City. Then in June 2008, Snapper presented the work in Ljubljana, Slovenia—which performance was reviewed by Jela Krečič in the Slovenian newspaper Delo, while Mojca Kumerdej interviewed Snapper for the newspaper’s weekend supplement.

The underwater performances subsequently matured into a larger work: You Who Will Emerge from the Flood.

=== You Who Will Emerge from the Flood ===
In 2009, Snapper and composer Andrew Infanti created You Who Will Emerge From the Flood, a site-specific underwater opera in which Snapper performed partly submerged in water. The work premiered at Victoria Baths in Manchester, England, in May 2009 as part of the Queer Up North festival.

The work centers on ”Blorkra”, an aquatic posthuman figure living in a post-apocalyptic future. Snapper performs the role while submerged in a pool, using techniques designed to generate and project the singing voice under and at the surface of the water. The production combined live singing, electronic sound, video projection, and a chorus positioned in and around the pool.

The Independent described the Manchester performance as the world’s first underwater “operella” (using the terms of the artists-creators), while the Los Angeles Times then referred to the work as the world’s first underwater opera.

The Manchester premiere received coverage in the British press, including The Times and The Independent, and Snapper was interviewed during its rehearsal on BBC Radio 4's Front Row.

In October 2009, Snapper produced the work at the TRAMA Festival in Porto, Portugal. The performance involved local volunteer singers, and was reviewed by Ana Maria Henriques in the Portuguese newspaper Público.

The work was subsequently presented in Poland, Switzerland and Australia. A 2017 performance at the Bendigo International Festival of Exploratory Music was reviewed by Lewis Ingham, who discussed the work’s underwater staging, electronic sound and treatment of themes including violence, gender, and sexuality.

The work has also been studied in scholarship on the materiality of singing. Nina Sun Eidsheim examined Snapper’s underwater vocal practice in her research on voice and embodied sound, while a 2023 episode of the British/Norwegian podcast "Soundmaking" discusses the project by Snapper and Infanti, its development, and its performance history. The episode also includes a radio “mashup” of certain musical moments in the work.

=== Opera Listens to You ===
In 2011, Snapper introduced Opera Listens to You, a participatory performance work presented at the Walker Art Center in Minneapolis. The project was produced with the Twin Cities vocal ensemble Deviated Septet.

The work sought to alter the conventional relationship between performer and audience: participants were invited to describe their feelings or experiences, while the vocal ensemble listened and responded musically. Laura Robards documented the creative process and first performance of the work for the Walker Art Center.

=== Collaboration with Philippe Manoury and Miller Puckette ===
Snapper has been collaborating extensively for a long time with French composer Philippe Manoury and computer music researcher Miller Puckette. Their work has included performances involving real-time electronic processing of the voice.

==== En écho ====
Manoury’s En écho was composed for soprano and real-time electronics, and conceived at the IRCAM in Paris in collaboration with Miller Puckette.

In March 2003, Snapper gave its American premiere in New York on the occasion of the Sounds French Festival (Philosophy Hall at Columbia University).

Among other presentations of the work, Snapper performed En écho in 2008 at the Ojai Music Festival in California. The event was reviewed by the Los Angeles Times, describing the interaction between Snapper’s voice and Puckette’s electronics.

The work was later performed by Snapper and Puckette internationally, including at the Bendigo International Festival of Exploratory Music in Australia in 2017.

==== Illud etiam ====
Illud etiam is a work composed by Philippe Manoury for soprano and real-time electronics, specially composed for and dedicated to Snapper, and conceived in collaboration with Miller Puckette. Snapper gave its world premiere in the United States at Space4Art, San Diego, in October 2012.

Robert Bush reviewed the San Diego performance for the San Diego Reader, describing the electronic transformation of Snapper’s voice by Puckette’s system.

Later, Snapper performed Illud etiam at the Bendigo International Festival of Exploratory Music in 2017. The performance was reviewed by Joel Roberts, who focused on the interaction between Snapper’s voice and computer-based electronics.

==== Double Voiced ====
Double Voiced is an experimental piece composed and performed by Snapper in collaboration with Miller Puckette. It explores the use of interactive electronic systems to transform and redistribute in real-time various independent singing voices.

The work took form through live performances around the world, including presentations at the Shanghai Conservatory of Music (China, 2013), in the United States at the Fiske Planetarium (University of Colorado Boulder) in 2015, and at the Bendigo Bank Theatre (Australia), on the occasion of the 2017 Bendigo International Festival of Exploratory Music.

=== Other performance and installation work ===
Snapper has also participated in the design and production of installations including Will you not window me?, Stains and Sparkles, Hojotoho!, Skeet in the Broek and Bouche à l’eau. Each of these works include issues close to Juliana Snapper, her collaborative partners, and each address aspects of contemporary politics.

Bouche à l’eau, presented in 2017, was commissioned by the Museum of Modern Art in Warsaw, Poland, and incorporated video documentation of You Who Will Emerge from the Flood.

==== Tell me all. Tell me now ====
On 24 July 2026, Snapper gave the world premiere of Philippe Manoury’s Tell me all. Tell me now at the Chigiana International Festival in Siena, Italy. The performance took place at the Sant'Agostino’s Church. The work, commissioned by the Ernst von Siemens Music Foundation with the Accademia Musicale Chigiana, is scored for female voice and real-time live electronics, with Snapper as its vocal soloist. Its text draws on the eighth chapter of James Joyce’s Finnegans Wake. During a live TV interview, Manoury and Snapper discuss the choice of the text, its relation to the singer and to the site chosen for its premiere.

The piece is scheduled to be performed again as the French premiere in June 2027 at the Maison de la Radio et de la Musique in Paris

== Artistic practice ==
Snapper’s work has been associated with experimental approaches to opera and with attempts to extend conventional conceptions of vocal performance. Her underwater performances have focused attention on the physical conditions of vocal production and on the relationship between sound, bodily vibration and the environment in which a voice is produced and received.

Her collaborations with composers and electronic-music researchers have explored the relationship between the human voice and no A.I. computing technology. In works by Manoury, electronic processing transforms or responds to the singer’s voice in real time, while Opera Listens to You and Double Voiced explore listening, interaction and vocal agency as elements of performance.
