= Heenan & Froude =

UK engineering company

- Company type: Public
- Industry: Engineering
- Founded: 1881, Newton Heath, Manchester
- Founder: Richard Hammersley Heenan & Richard Hurrell Froude
- Defunct: 1986
- Fate: Reverse takeover
- Successor: St. Modwen Properties
- Headquarters: Worcester, England
- Number of locations: Birmingham, Manchester, Leeds, London, Worcester
- Area served: Global

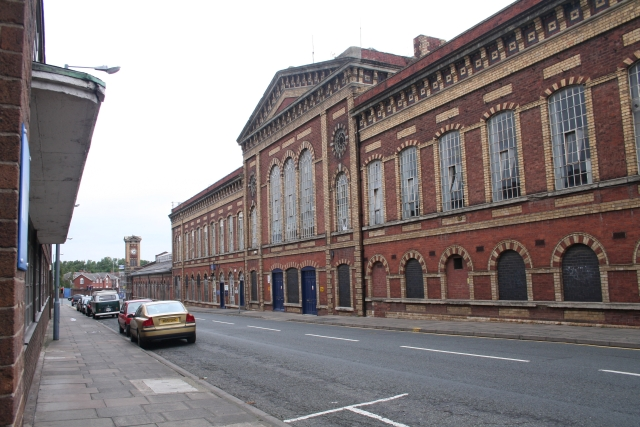
The former Heenan & Froude offices, Worcester, September 2007

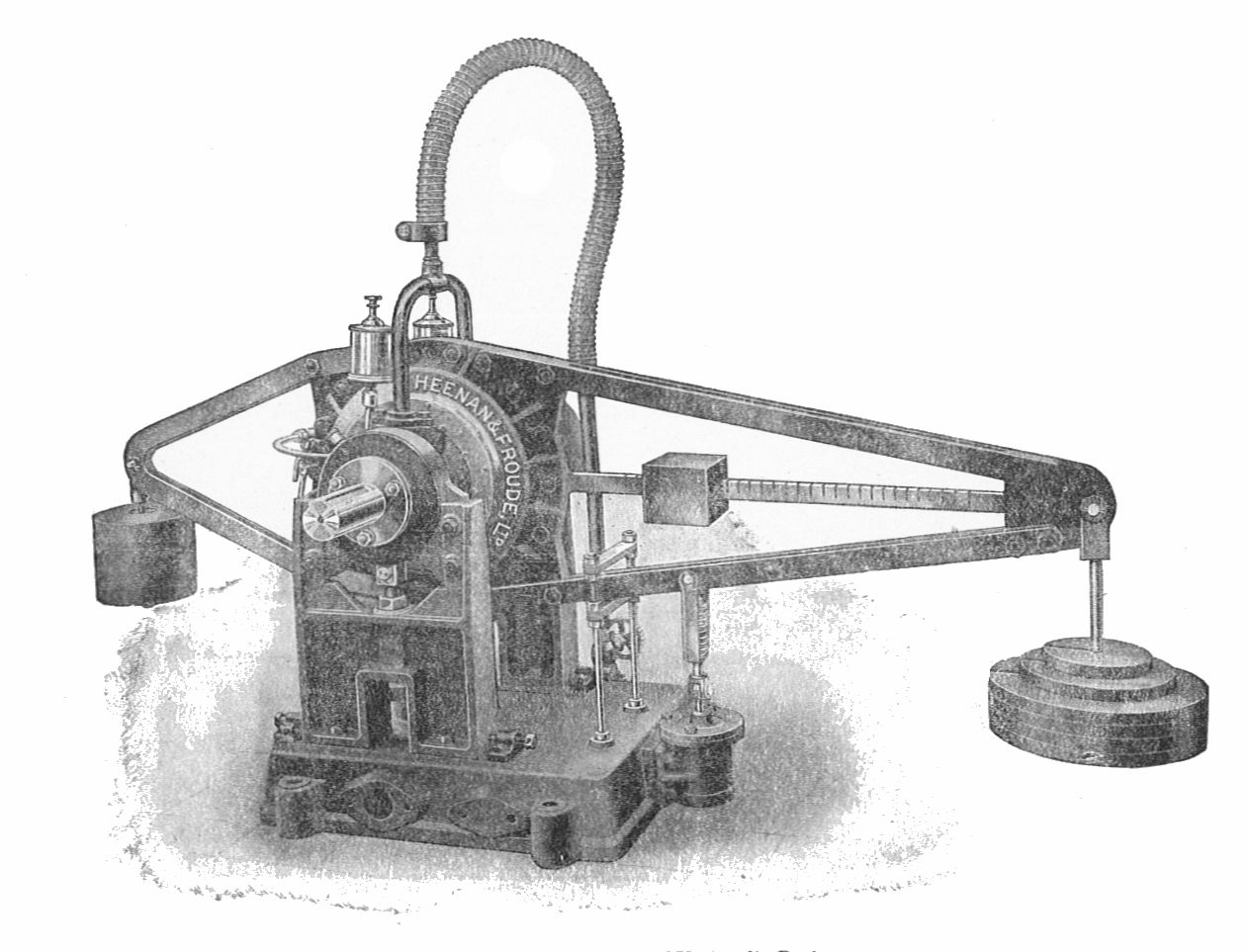
A Heenan & Froude developed water brake dynamometer

Heenan & Froude was a United Kingdom-based engineering company, founded in 1881 in Newton Heath, Manchester, England, in a partnership formed by engineers Richard Froude and Richard Hammersley Heenan. Expanded on the back of William Froude's patent for inventing the water brake dynamometer, their most famous creation was the 518-foot (158 m)-high Blackpool Tower.

== History ==
After service on developing the East India Railway (EIR), Hammersley Heenan returned to England and purchased the engineering company and works of Woodhouse and Co. in Newton Heath, Lancashire. In 1881, he went into partnership with former EIR colleague Richard Hurrell Froude, forming Heenan & Froude Ltd. In 1883, after the death of his father William Froude, Richard inherited the rights to his father's patents, including that for the manufacture of the water brake dynamometer.

From its base, the company undertook a number of significant late-Victorian era engineering projects, including supplying and constructing the steelworks for Folkestone Pier (1887) and in the same year supplying a 1,600 feet (490 m) girder bridge to Empresa de los Ferrocarriles del Estado (EFE) the national railway of Chile. The company developed two designs of steerable torpedo, the first to the design of Colonel Lay which were demonstrated to both the Admiralty, and the second to an Australian design. In 1882 Heenan & Froude were appointed structural engineers to the Blackpool Tower, supplying and constructing both the main tower, the electric lighting and the steel front pieces for the aquariums. They were also the architects behind Castlefield viaduct, Manchester, built in 1892.

After purchasing a factory in Birmingham, West Midlands in 1902, the company greatly expanded after incorporating and moving its headquarters to Worcester in 1903. By then a general purpose engineering company, they made: exhaust and mine ventilating fans; colliery and mining plant; belts, conveyors and elevators; sawing machines; bench chains; water dynamometers; spherical, horizontal and vertical engines; patent water boilers; bridge and roof iron work; and refuse destructors.

=== STD Motors ===
After World War I, the motorcar company Darracq and Company London (originally French, British owned since 1903) acquired a major stake in the company. After Darracq was merged into STD Motors in 1920 (the merger of the Sunbeam-Talbot-Darracq motorcar companies), STD also acquired the residual shares in Heenan & Froude.

=== Heenan Group ===
After STD Motors went bankrupt in 1935, the business was acquired by investors and renamed Heenan Group Ltd. At that point, it comprised seven engineering companies across five factories, and resultantly listed on the London Stock Exchange. After agreeing a 50/50 joint-venture company in 1938 with Caprotti Ltd to develop and sell steam locomotive valves, the board then began to build the business further through acquisition, including buying Gloucester-based Fielding & Platt in 1939.

=== Acquisitions ===
Having become a shadow factory during World War II, supplying precision aircraft parts, post-war the company was chaired by A.P. Good. Through acquisition, he created a railway engineering business division by amalgamating significant parts of the UK's locomotive building industry:

- Associated Locomotive Equipment: which operated from Shrub Hill Works, Worcester
- W. G. Bagnall of Stafford: which specialised in building railway rolling stock and locomotives. It was sold to W.H. Dorman & Co. Ltd. of Stafford in 1959.
- Brush Electrical Engineering Company
- Caprotti Ltd: acquired all outstanding shares

ALE owned the UK rights for the production of poppet valve gears for steam locomotives, including British-Caprotti, and the Lentz Rotary Cam and Oscillating Cam systems. The most important locomotive equipped by the company was the unique BR Standard Class 8 4-6-2 No.71000 Duke of Gloucester.

Good died in 1953, after which the various businesses were sold off piecemeal by his successor James Fielding. After the company supplied dynamometers to Ford UK to test the Ford GT40, Fielding acquired the first UK-supplied and fourth built model of the car.

=== Redman Heenan Froude ===
In 1968 Heenan Group was acquired by Redman Engineering, and renamed itself Redman Heenan Froude Ltd. Soon afterwards the company decided to cease its heavy engineering business and concentrate instead on property development and leasing, changing its name again to Redman Heenan International plc. In the late 1980s, the division of Froude Engineering became part of Babcock International.

=== St. Modwen Properties ===
In April 1986, Sir Stanley Clarke CBE led the reverse takeover of the company, by backing his Clarke St. Modwen property development business into the virtual shell company that was Redman Heenan International plc. Following completion of the deal, the company was renamed St. Modwen Properties plc. The residual engineering businesses were sold to FKI Group in 1987.
