= St. Modwen Properties =

British real estate company

St. Modwen Properties Limited
- Type: Private limited company
- Industry: Property and Regeneration
- Predecessor: Clarke St. Modwen; Redman Heenan International plc
- Founded: 1966
- Headquarters: Birmingham, United Kingdom
- Key people: Sir Stanley Clarke CBE, (co-founder); Jim Leavesley, (co-founder); Danuta Gray, Non Executive chairman Sarwjit Sambhi, (CEO)
- Revenue: ▼£342.1 million (2020)
- Operating income: ▼£(126.6) million (2020)
- Net income: ▼£(120.8) million (2020)
- Parent: The Blackstone Group
- Website: www.stmodwen.co.uk

St. Modwen Properties Ltd. was a British-based property investment and development business specialising in the regeneration and remediation of brownfield land and urban environments. It was headquartered in Birmingham and had a network of four regional offices across the UK. It was listed on the London Stock Exchange until it was acquired by The Blackstone Group in August 2021.

== History ==
The business was founded by Sir Stanley Clarke CBE and his brother-in-law Jim Leavesley in 1966 as a property development business called Clarke St. Modwen. In 1986 the management reversed the business into Redman Heenan International plc, a listed former engineering concern that had become a shell company. At that time, in 1986, the name was changed to St. Modwen Properties plc. In the 1980s the company developed the Stoke-on-Trent Garden Festival site.

In January 2004 the company acquired a 230-acre site at Longbridge from Phoenix Venture Holdings. The land at the Longbridge site was obtained by St Modwen Properties at a fraction of the actual value after the company paid a £100,000 property commission to a firm run by an associate of the Phoenix Four.

In January 2013 the company entered into a development agreement for the New Covent Garden Market site in London and in March 2013 the company entered into a development agreement for the first phase of Swansea University's Bay Campus.

In June 2016 the company entered into development agreements for the Spray Street Quarter in Woolwich, a regeneration project in joint venture with Notting Hill Housing to create a mixed-use development; Chippenham Gateway in Wiltshire, a 79-acre site to be developed into a 1 million sq ft industrial park; and Stanton Cross, Wellingborough, a project involving 1 million sq ft of industrial accommodation.

In July 2016 the company established a private rented sector (PRS) business unit.

In 2018, the Court of Appeal ruled that in entering a development agreement with St. Modwen to develop an industrial estate in Newbury, West Berkshire Council had "effectively agreed to act unlawfully in the future". The disposal of the land in question was seen by the Council as a "land transaction" rather than a public works contract, and the opportunity to acquire the land was advertised so as to secure interested bids and "best consideration" in accordance with the Local Government Act 1972. The agreement allowed the developer the option to draw down land under a series of long leases, but if an option was taken up, the developer was contractually obliged to develop the site. The Court of Appeal, overruling the Administrative Court's judgment at first instance, held that such "contingent obligations" met the criteria for being considered a public works contract, whose procurement should have been undertaken in accordance with the full requirements of the Public Contracts Regulations 2015. The development agreement was ruled "ineffective".

The company agreed to be acquired by The Blackstone Group in a £1.24 billion (€1.4 billion) transaction in May 2021.

The assets managed by St. Modwen Logistics were transferred to Industrials REIT, later Indurent, in July 2024.

In December 2024, Miller Homes agreed a deal to buy St. Modwen Homes in a deal worth around £215 million, subject to regulatory approval in early 2025.

== Operations ==
The company had three business units:

- St. Modwen Homes
- St. Modwen Industrial & Logistics
- Strategic Land and Regeneration

The company owned a property portfolio valued at £0.9 billion at 30 November 2020.
