= Great Manchester Cycle =

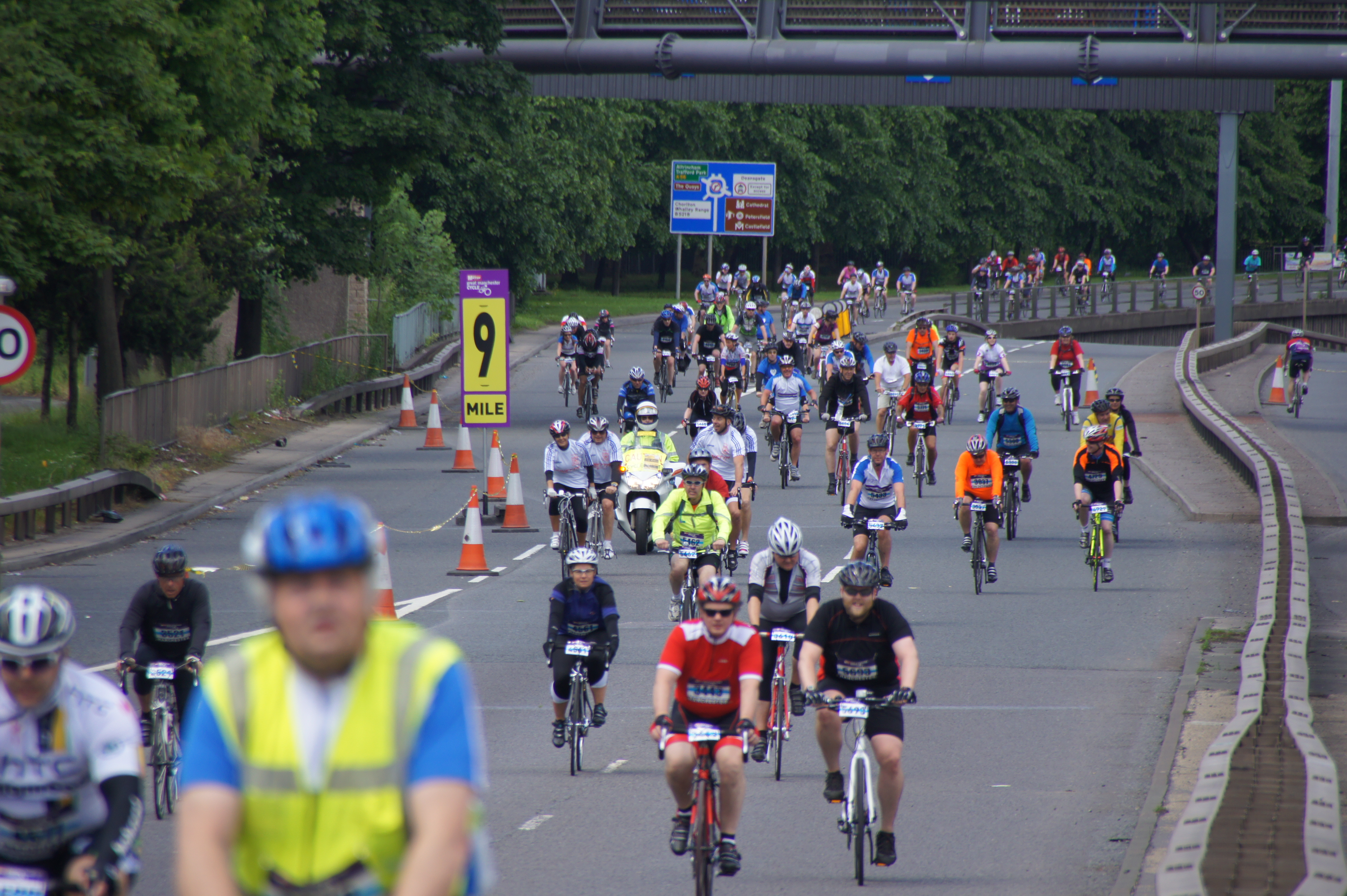
Cyclists on the Mancunian Way, during the 2012 event

The Great Manchester Cycle is a closed-road cyclosportive held in Manchester, Trafford and Salford, England, during summer. Participants are invited to ride one, two or four laps of a 13 mi (21 km) course which starts at the City of Manchester Stadium in east Manchester, heads along the Mancunian Way and into Old Trafford, before returning to the start line.

Around 8,000 cyclists took part in the 2013 event.

== Route ==
The 2012 13 mi (21 km) closed-road course began at the City of Manchester Stadium and headed south to Ashton Old Road. There it turned west and onto the Mancunian Way, leaving that road at its junction with Chester Road. From there the route went southwest, heading into Trafford Park, before crossing the Manchester Ship Canal to take a short diversion through Salford Quays. Once through MediaCityUK, the route again crossed the Ship Canal, went past Old Trafford and back onto Chester Road, from where it headed back to the start, along the Mancunian Way.

The 2013 course followed a broadly similar route, with modified start and finish positions, and no diversion through Salford Quays.

== Participants ==
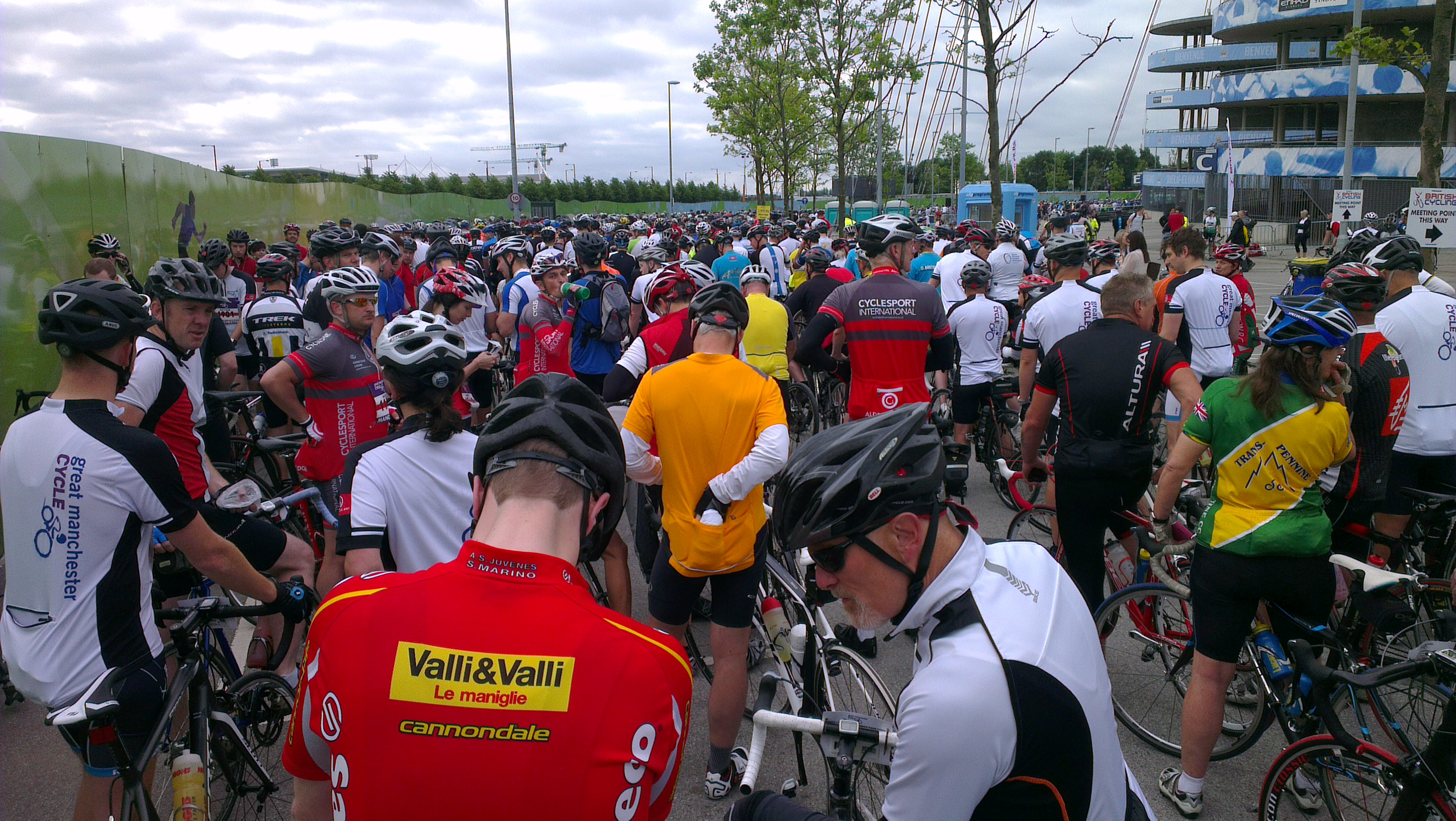
Cyclists line up to start the 2013 event

About 7,000 cyclists took part in 2012, with the 52 mi (84 km) event, which began at about 8:00 am, attracting around 1,500 riders. They were led by Olympic cyclists Rebecca Romero and Lizzie Armitstead. Other celebrities who took part in later events included actors from Coronation Street and Emmerdale, while some cyclists raised money for charity. The roads were re-opened by 5:00 pm.

Officially launched on 28 February 2012, it was set up by Nova International in partnership with Manchester City Council. The event forms part of a "Great" series of sporting events in Manchester, including the Great Manchester Run and the Great Manchester Swim.

Sponsors The Daily Mirror called it a "huge success".

More than 8,000 cyclists took part in the 2013 event, led by Olympic gold medallist Joanna Rowsell. Actors from the television drama series Emmerdale also took part. About 2,800 cyclists rode the 52 mi (84 km) route.

== See also ==
- Cycling in Manchester
