= Mayfield Baths =

Victorian washhouse in Manchester

Coordinates: 53.4747°N 2.2270°W

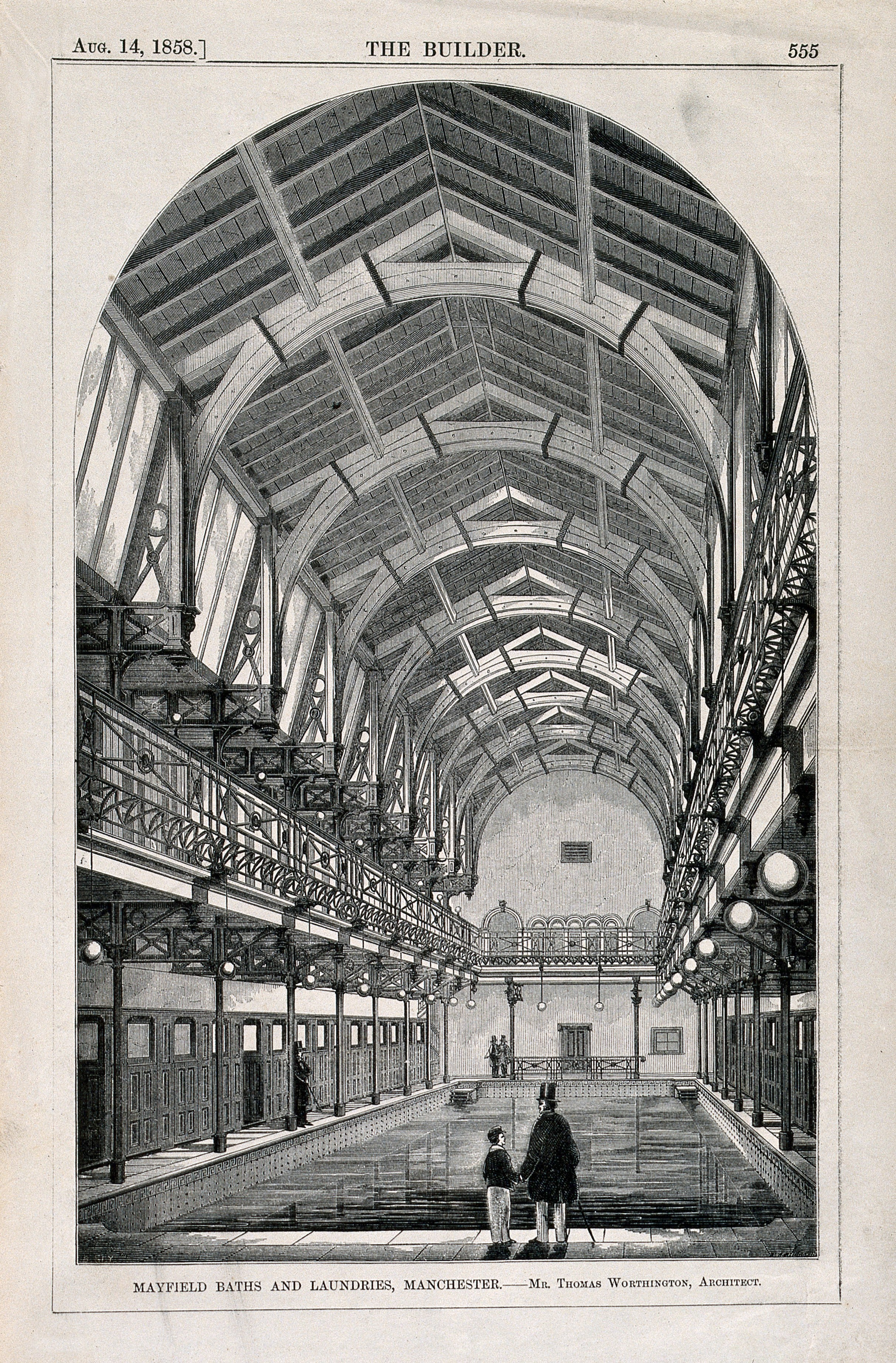
Wood engraving of Mayfield Baths and Laundries by W.E. Hodgkin, 1858, published in The Builder magazine, 14 August 1858

Mayfield Baths was a Victorian washhouse and laundry in Manchester, England that opened in 1857 to serve workers in the surrounding print and textile factories. The building, behind Manchester Piccadilly station in the Cottonopolis district, was of Italianate design and its pools were nearly 20 metres (66 ft) long. The architect was Thomas Worthington.

== History ==
The first of the Baths and wash houses in Britain available for public use were established in Liverpool. St. George's Pier Head salt-water baths were opened in 1828 by the Corporation of Liverpool.

The concept of bath houses became well publicised by the Baths and Wash-houses Act 1846, which was intended to encourage cities to voluntarily build such facilities. According to BBC News, a small privately owned bath house existed in Manchester, in a house on Miller Street, by 1846. Although the city established a Baths & Wash Houses committee in 1876, it did not adopt the Act until 1877.

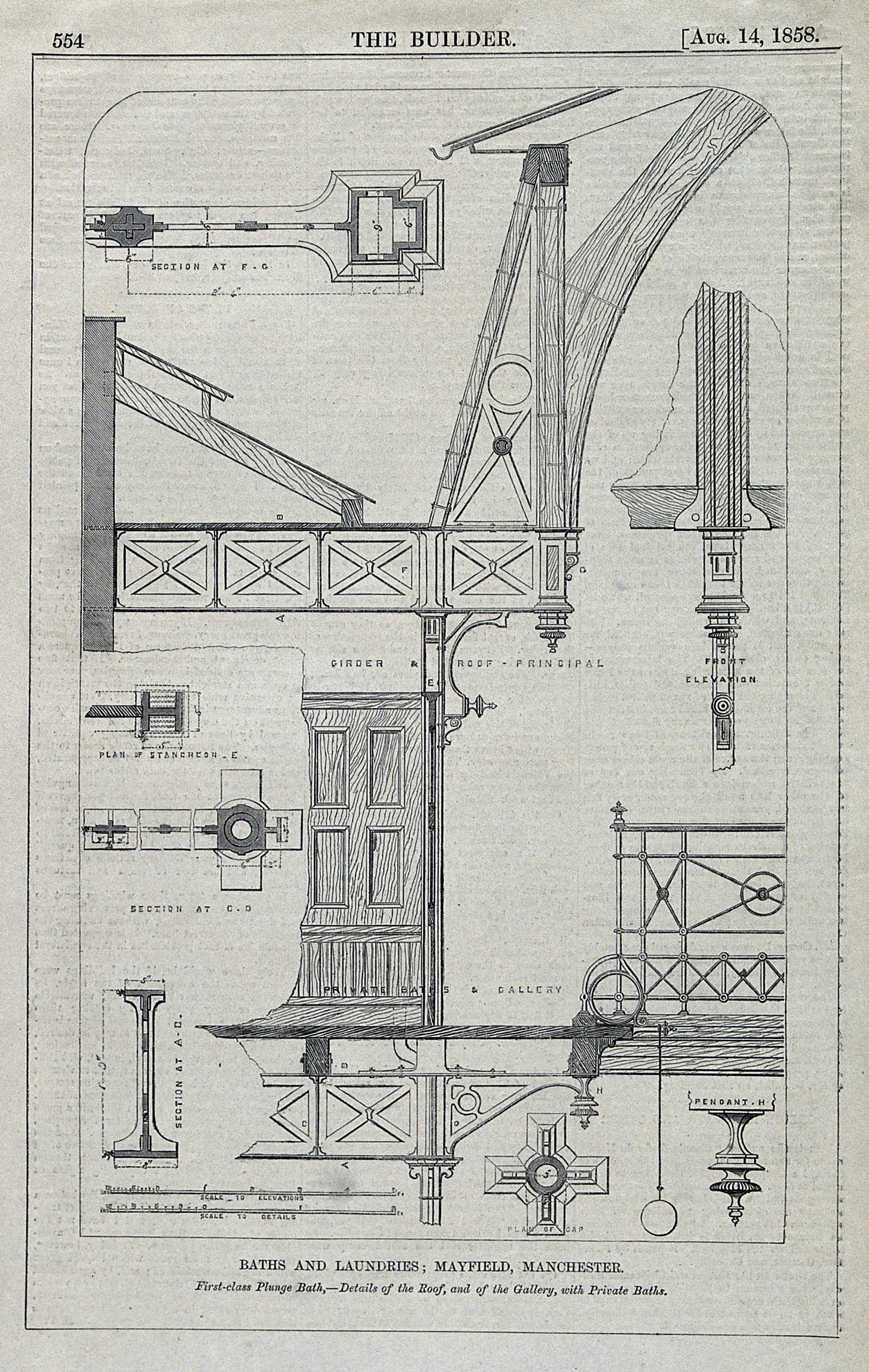
Architectural details of Mayfield Baths

Two bath and laundry facilities were planned in 1855, by private enterprise: the Manchester and Salford Baths & Laundries Company. Greengate Baths opened in nearby Salford in 1856 and Mayfield Baths opened in the following year. It contained two pools, one for men and one for women, the larger being 62 feet (19 metres) long. The construction cost for each facility was about £10,000. The Mayfield building was purchased for £19,000 by the city in September 1877.

By the late 19th century, Manchester had 30 bath houses. One of the most active promoters of the health benefits of the facility was George Poulton, who gave public swimming lessons. A 2021 report stated that a large commercial building, named The Poulton, was to be erected in his honour.

Ian Miller, assistant director of archaeology at the University of Salford, explained the rationale for the concept: "Before public baths the textile workers lived in crammed insanitary conditions and would wash their clothes in the used bath water ... Public baths were a game changer for the health of the working classes, keeping clean and having clean clothes were essential for public health".

One history of the era describes the design of the first two large public baths as including "ornate Italianate façades, featuring an extensive double storey run of windows and doors with a long arcade coupled with elegant and finely detailed chimneys for the new boilers [for] extensive washing and laundry facilities alongside the public and class segregated pools".

The baths were demolished after being bombed in 1940, during the Second World War; later a car park was built on the site.

=== Discovery of the pool ===
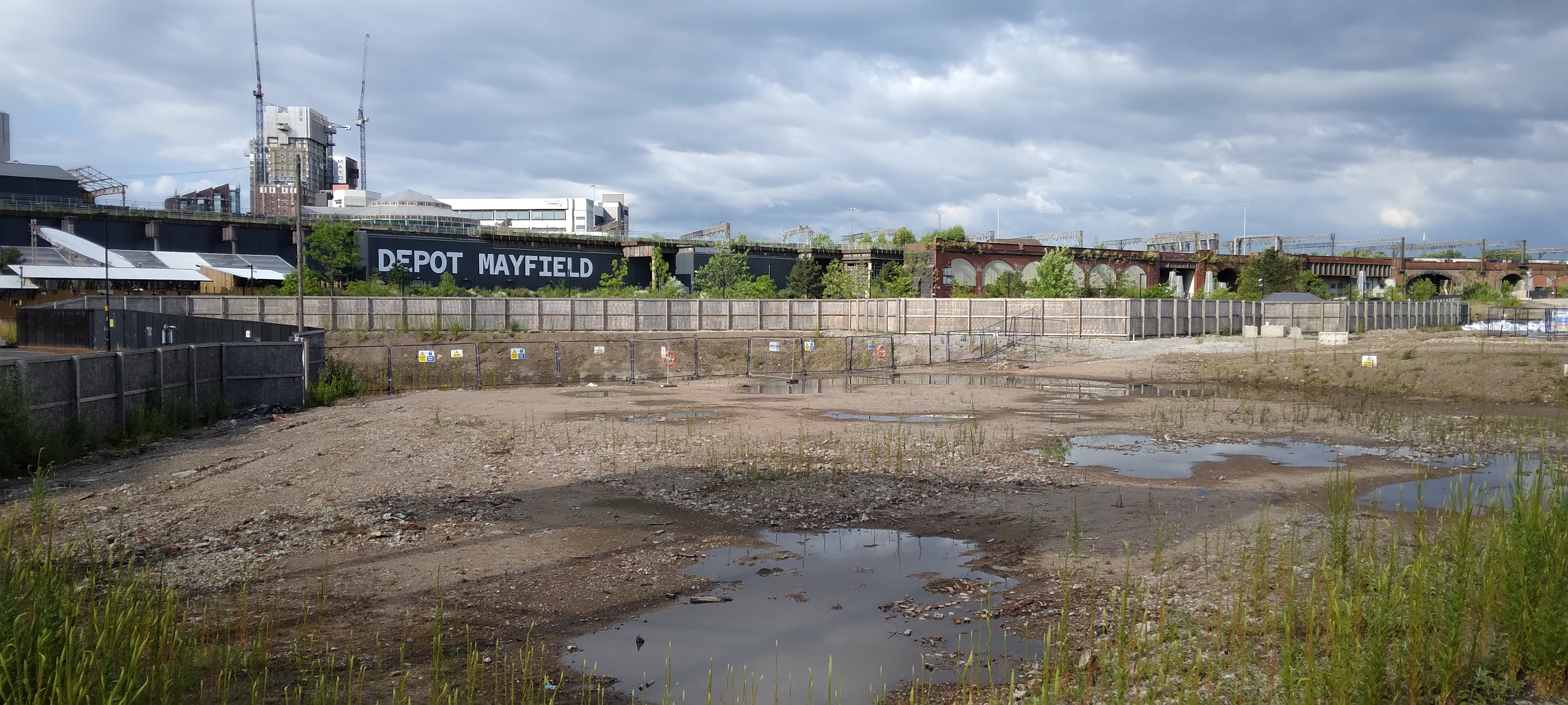
The site of the baths, south of Mayfield Park, in June 2023 (viewed from Baring Street)

In 2020, the intact remains of the swimming pools on a street now known as Baring Street were discovered in "stunning" condition by archaeologists from the University of Salford. The site was incorporated into Mayfield Park, which was the "first new public park built in the city in 100 years". According to a local news source, "archaeologists are using 3D laser scanning and low level drone photography to produce an accurate, detailed record of the findings which will later be combined with historical documents and CAD software to produce digital drawings, in a process known as 'preservation by record'". As of 11 January 2021, "two large tiled pools, boilers [to heat water], flues and pumps" had been discovered.

Graham Mottershead, project manager of Salford Archaeology, said that the "sheer pace of change and innovation during the Industrial Revolution means many advancements were not recorded. Excavations like this help us to learn a great deal about what is arguably the most important period of human history and, in the case of Mayfield, a location that is so very relevant to the heritage of the people of Manchester."

== See also ==
- Manchester Mayfield railway station
- Public bathing
- Victoria Baths
