= Elevated park =

Parks located above the normal ground (street) level

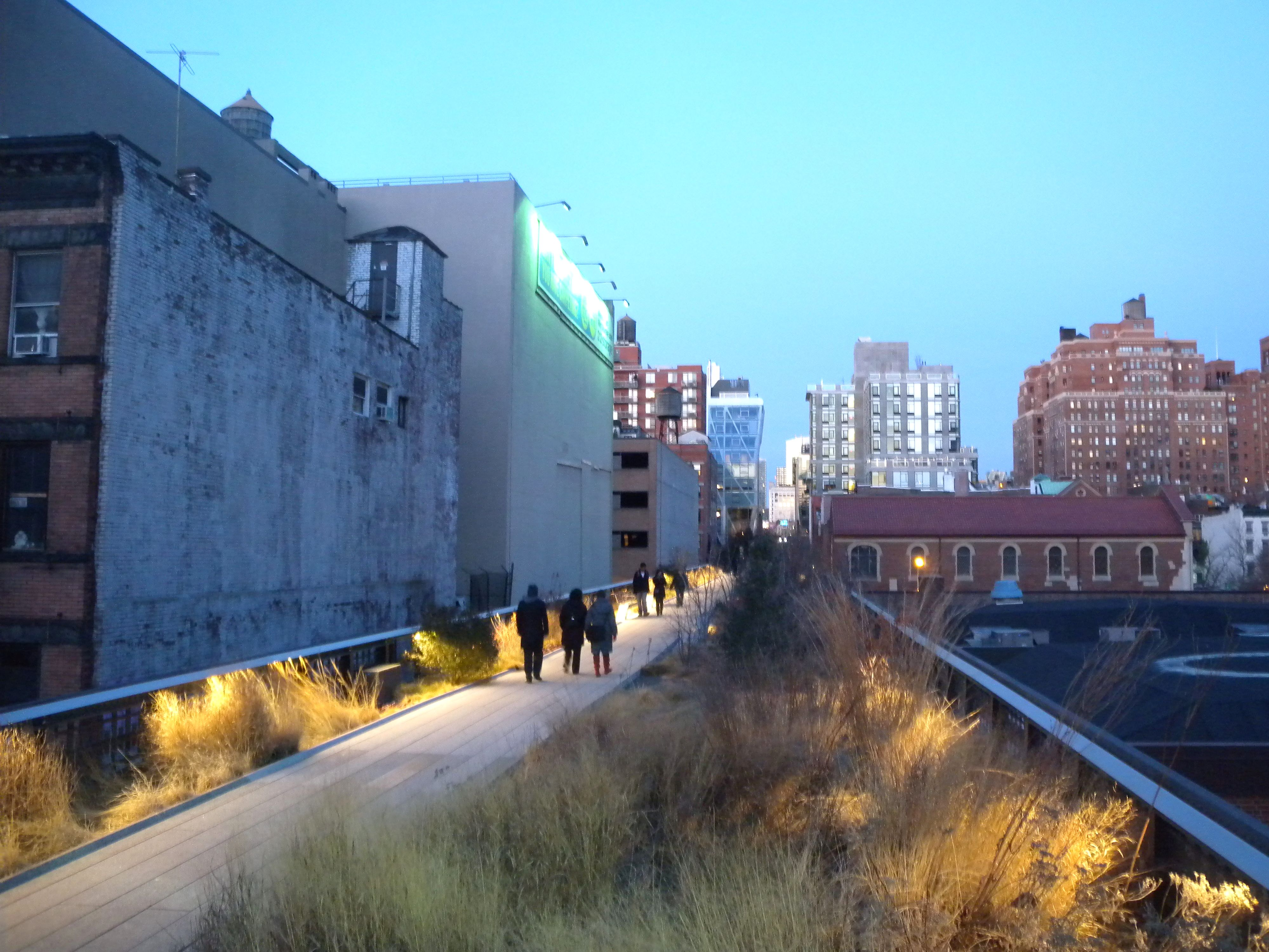
The High Line in New York City is built on a disused elevated railway.

An elevated park (sometimes known as a sky park) is a type of park located above the normal ground (street) level. It has become more popular in the early 21st century, featuring in a number of urban renewal projects. While usually associated with repurposed transportation infrastructure, some elevated parks are designed on top of buildings.

Elevated parks can exist, for example, on the roof of existing buildings (see also: green roof, roof garden), or on former railways, elevated roads, or other elevated urban elements (often becoming linear parks as well). Examples of a linear elevated park include New York's High Line, Chicago's Bloomingdale Line, or Seoul's Seoullo 7017 Skypark. One of the earliest of such parks was the Promenade plantée (Coulée verte René-Dumont) in Paris, dating to 1993. It has proven popular enough to encourage other cities to consider similar projects, a process that gained further momentum after the success of the High Line, the first such park in the United States, which opened in 2009. Numerous cities worldwide have looked into or started construction of elevated parks, including London, Washington, DC, Jersey City, Chicago, Philadelphia, San Francisco, São Paulo, and Rotterdam. In 2015, Hélène Littke noted that the "High Line in New York City started a worldwide trend of elevated parks", and new elevated parks are often compared to it.

Elevated parks have been criticized for high costs, though they have generally attracted positive reviews, including from academia. Littke observed that "The High Line is undoubtedly loved, and it is a successful place in many ways", and that its success proves that "elevated parks can bring 'new' nature into cities without occupying ground-floor space".

In 2016, a public referendum to convert Seattle's Alaskan Way Viaduct into an elevated park, inspired by the High Line, was strongly rejected by voters.

In 2022, a sky park was constructed on Castlefield Viaduct in Manchester, England.

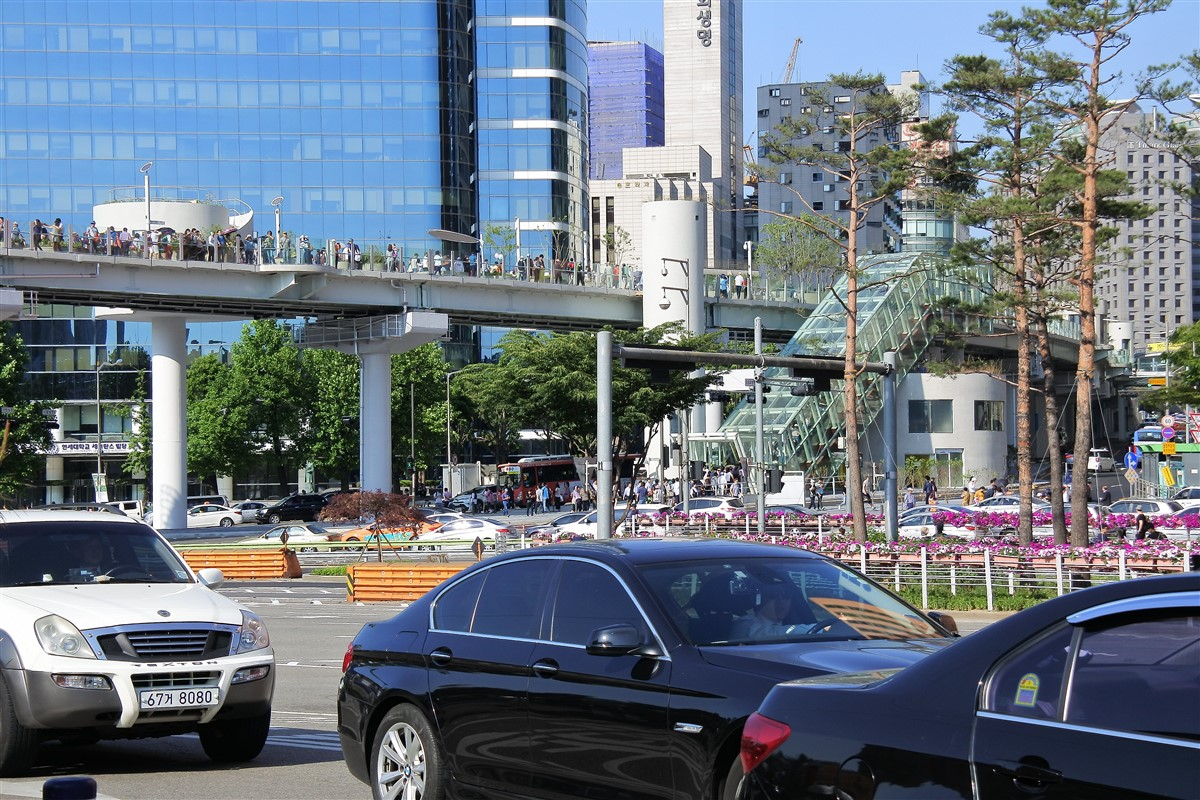
Seoul 7017 Skypark is a new park converted from a defunct overpass.
