= Mayfield Park, Manchester =

Park in Manchester, England

Mayfield Park
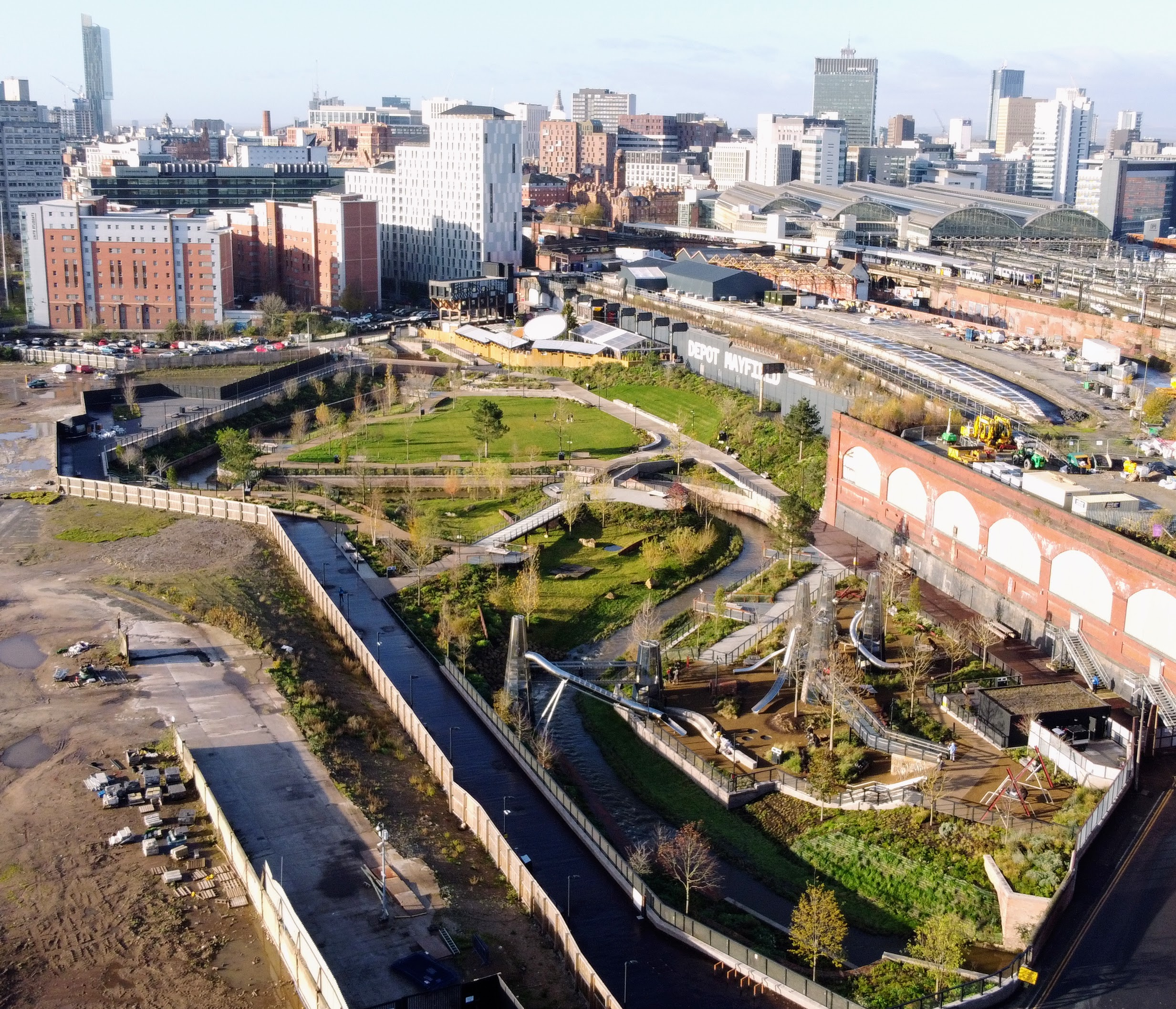
- Mayfield Park with Manchester city centre in the background
- Interactive map of Mayfield Park
- Type: Municipal park
- Location: Manchester city centre, England
- Coordinates: 53.4748°N 2.2255°W
- Area: 6.5 acres (2.6 ha)
- Created: 2022; 4 years ago
- Public transit: Manchester Piccadilly
- Website: mayfieldpark.com

Mayfield Park is a park in Manchester city centre, England, covering an area of 6.5 acres (2.6 ha). The city centre's first new park in more than 100 years, it was officially opened on 22 September 2022.

== Toponymy ==
The park takes its name from Manchester Mayfield, a former railway station and industrial site on the south side of Fairfield Street next to Manchester Piccadilly station.

== History ==
The area had been mainly derelict since the 1980s, but is being redeveloped as part of a wider regeneration scheme that includes plans for 1,500 new homes, retail, leisure and office space.

The park had been more than six years in the planning, design and delivery. In 2020 the government pledged £23 million of investment from its Getting Building Fund – one of the largest investments in any single project – to Mayfield Park. This investment, delivered through the Greater Manchester Combined Authority (GMCA), was part of the government's strategy to support 'shovel ready' schemes that would help to drive economic recovery following the COVID-19 crisis.

In January 2020, the remains of two large tiled pools of the former Mayfield Baths on a street now known as Baring Street were discovered by archaeologists from the University of Salford on the site of the park.

The scheme was delivered by the Mayfield Partnership, a public-private venture comprising regeneration specialist U+I, Manchester City Council, Transport for Greater Manchester and UK Government placemakers LCR.

Smoking and vaping were banned in the park from 26 June 2023. Barbecues and alcohol are also prohibited.

In March 2025, planning submissions confirmed proposals for nearly 900 flats surrounding Mayfield Park within the wider Mayfield regeneration programme. They also set out an expansion of the park from 6.5 acres (2.6 ha) to 10 acres (4.0 ha), the planting of new trees, new seating, and upgraded walking and cycling links with the city centre.

As of September 2025, the park forms a central component of the CyanLines initiative, a strategic urban greening and connectivity programme aimed at establishing a 100-mile (160 km) network of linked parks, waterways, and pedestrian routes across Greater Manchester.

== Features ==
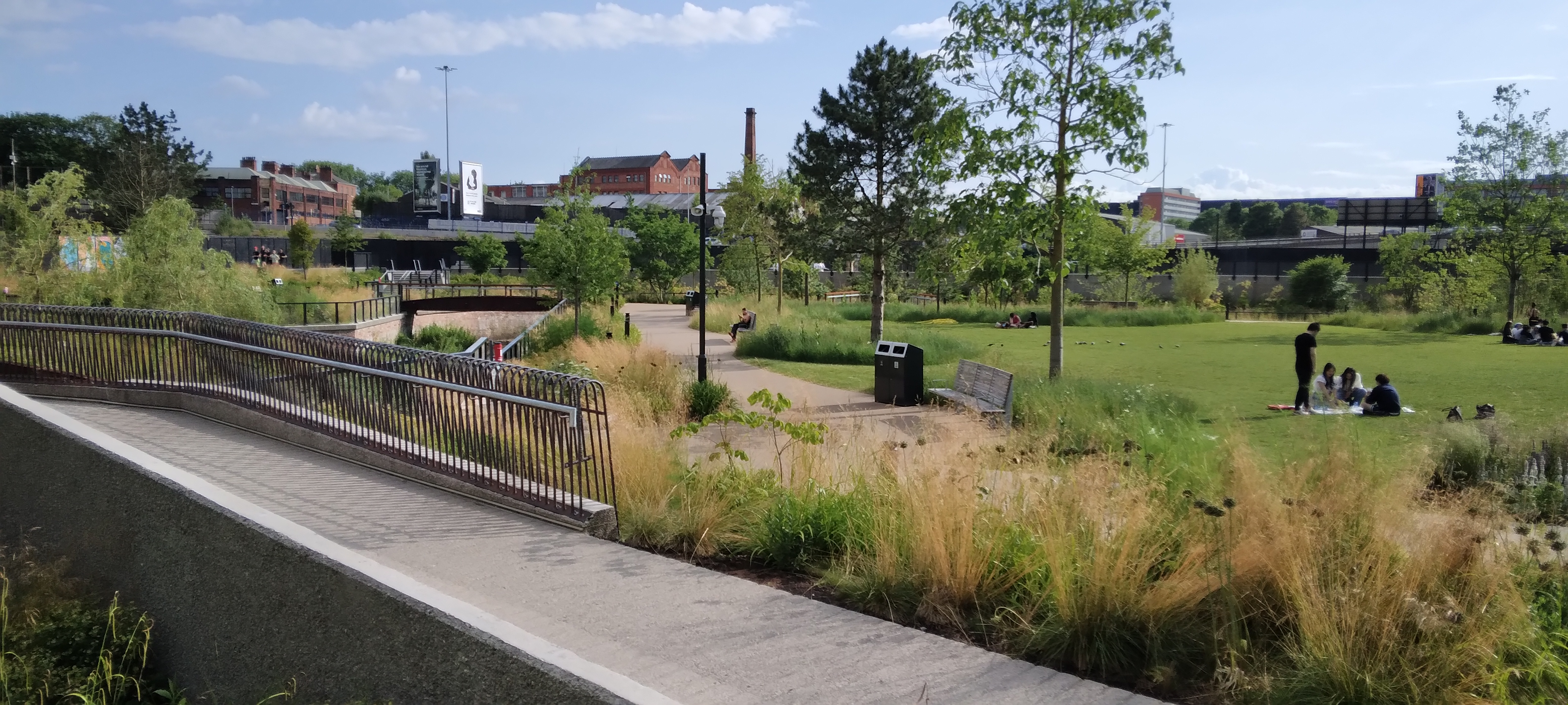
The park in June 2023

The park is on the banks of the River Medlock, a section of which was revealed after more than 50 years when concrete culverts were removed during construction. Three of the original steel beams have been retained to create the base of a new bridge over the river, forming part of extensive walkways.

There is a large children's playground with six slides and references to the industrial past of the site, as well as landscaped areas with thousands of plants and 142 trees spread across 58 species.

== See also ==
- Brownfield land
- Urban park
