= Castlefield Viaduct =

Former railway viaduct in Manchester, England

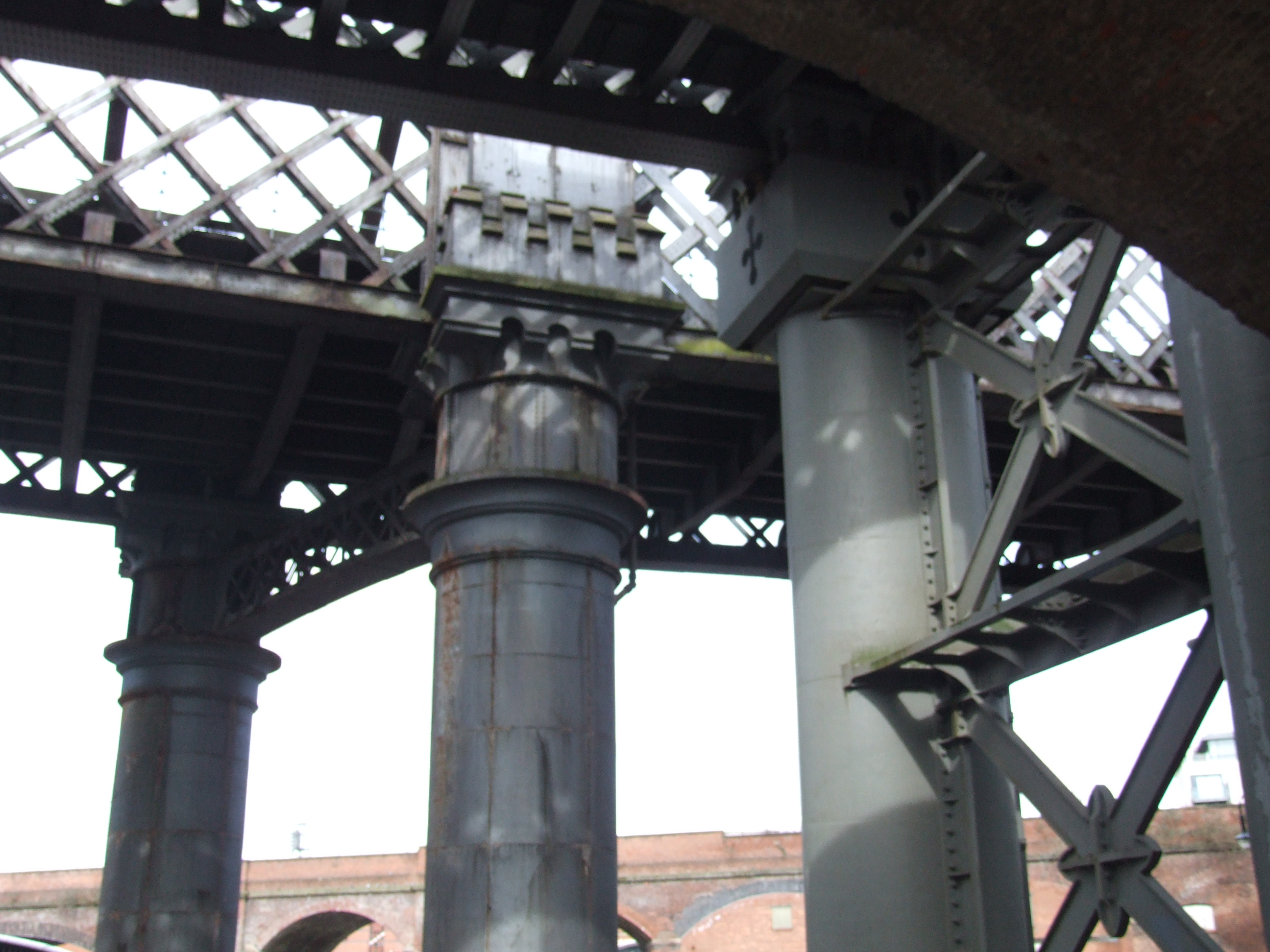
- Castlefield Viaduct, Manchester
- Coordinates: 53°28′30″N 2°15′16″W
- Owner: Department for Transport
- Maintained by: National Highways

Characteristics
- Material: Steel
- Total length: 330 m (1,080 ft)
- Height: 17 m (56 ft)

History
- Designer: Heenan & Froude
- Construction end: 1893
- Opened: 2022 (as a sky park)
- Closed: 1954

Listed Building – Grade II
- Official name: Castlefield Railway Viaduct from G-MEX to Dawson Street
- Designated: 14 February 1988
- Reference no.: 1292315

Location
- Interactive map of Castlefield Viaduct

Castlefield Viaduct is a 330-metre (1,080 ft) long former railway viaduct built in 1893, which used to carry heavy rail traffic in and out of the Great Northern Warehouse, located in the Castlefield area of Manchester, England.

The Grade II listed viaduct was designed by Heenan & Froude, the same engineering company behind Blackpool Tower. The viaduct is part of the Historical Railways Estate and since 2022 approximately a third of its length is a sky park.

== Design ==
The viaduct consists of eight steel spans, all to a similar design, totalling 330 metres (1,080 feet) in length and supported on large cast-iron columns which have castellated finials. It is part of a network of railway bridges and viaducts in the Castlefield area. It is on a fork from the line feeding Manchester Central railway station; the fork served Great Northern Warehouse on Deansgate in the city centre. A nearly parallel viaduct built by the Cheshire Lines Committee (also Grade II listed) now carries tram tracks for the Metrolink network.

== History ==
The viaduct was completed in 1893 and closed in 1954, (Note: Other sources report that the viaduct closed in the 1960s.) at the same time as the warehouse it was built to serve. It was built by Heenan & Froude, a local engineering firm. The viaduct was used as a backdrop to several television series, including the Manchester-set soap opera Coronation Street. It sat disused after closure until the 2020s, when it was taken over by the National Trust.

== Sky park ==
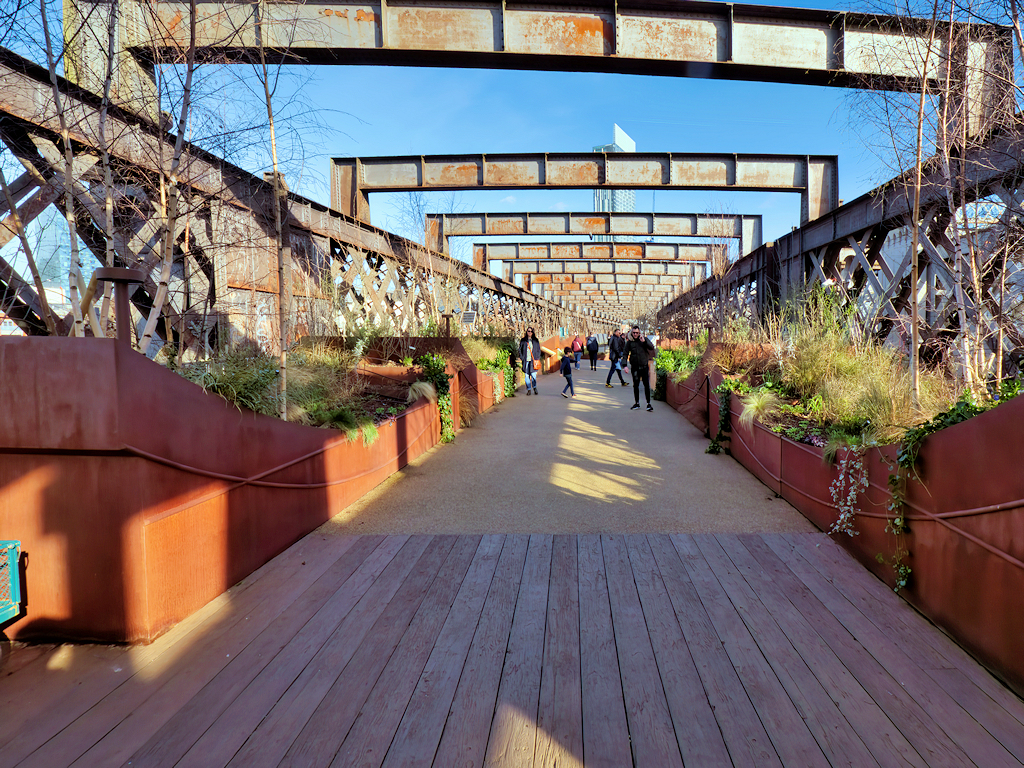
The sky park in 2023

Plans by the National Trust to turn the viaduct into a sky park were unveiled in June 2021, with the work starting in March 2022.

The viaduct had a test-opening from summer 2022 to summer 2023, during which time visitors had free guided visits.

In July 2023, the National Trust was granted an extension by Manchester City Council to keep the sky park open until winter 2024. Landscape architects BDP developed plans for the next phase of the viaduct.

In September 2024, details were unveiled to expand the sky park from the current 120 m (390 ft) to its full length. The planning application and listed building applications for phase 2 of the viaduct were submitted to Manchester City Council that same month. Planning approval was granted in April 2025.

In July 2025, the National Trust announced it had secured more than £2.5 million in funding from National Highways' Historical Railways Estate Team, Manchester City Council, the Greater Manchester Combined Authority, and the Railway Heritage Trust. Structural work is scheduled to begin in the autumn, with the new section anticipated to open by summer 2026.

As of September 2025, the sky park forms a central component of the CyanLines initiative, a strategic urban greening and connectivity programme aimed at establishing a 100-mile (160 km) network of linked parks, waterways, and pedestrian routes across Greater Manchester.

== See also ==
- Grade II listed buildings in Manchester
