= Victoria Baths =

Historical bathing venue in Manchester

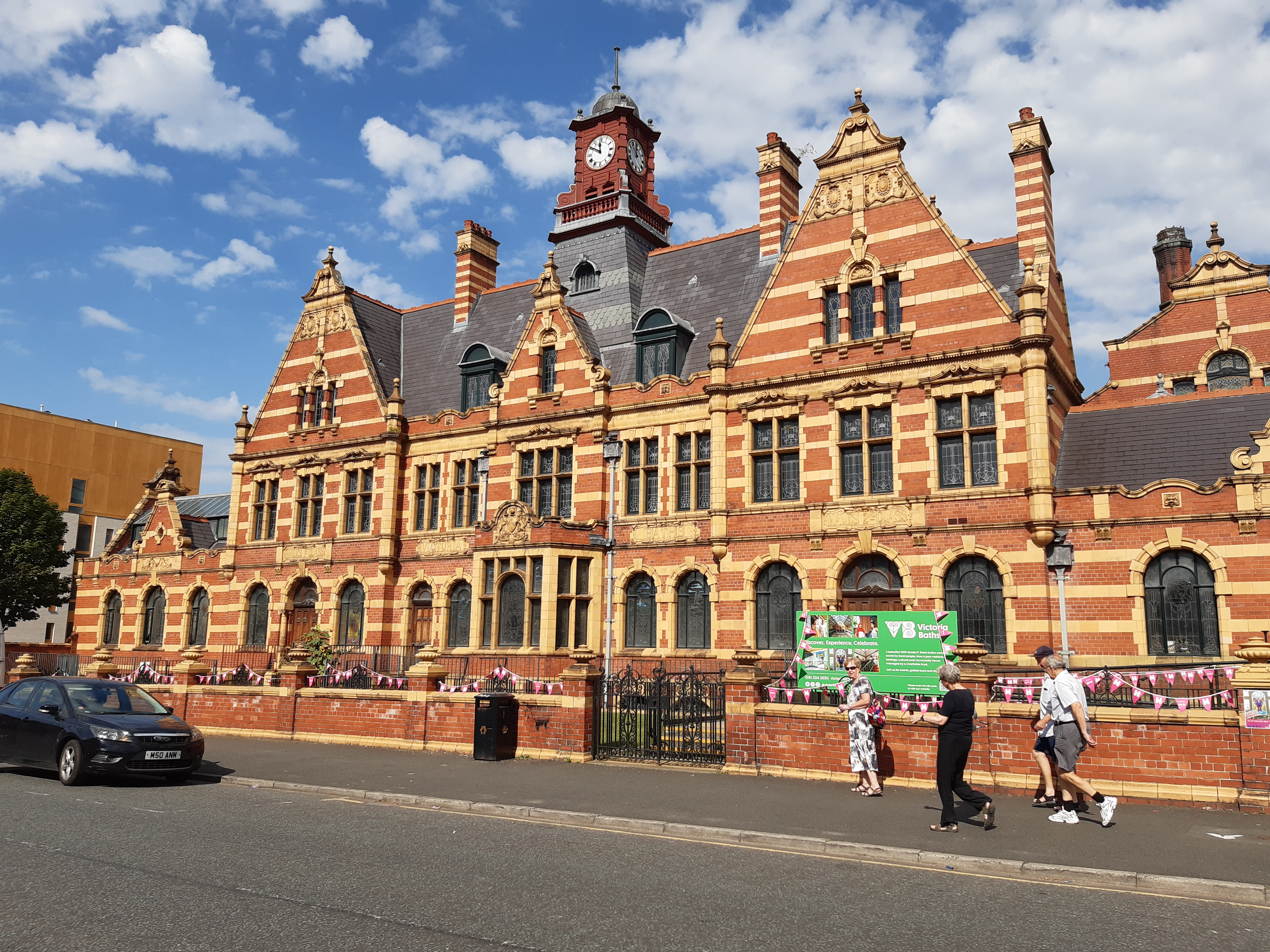
- Victoria Baths, Manchester

- Location within Greater Manchester

General information
- Location: Manchester, England
- Coordinates: 53.46°N 2.216°W
- Completed: 1906
- Cost: £59,144
- Client: Manchester Corporation

Design and construction
- Designations

Listed Building – Grade II*
- Official name: Victoria Baths with attached forecourt walls
- Designated: 18 January 1983
- Reference no.: 1200808

Website
- victoriabaths.org.uk

Victoria Baths is a Grade II* listed building, in the Chorlton-on-Medlock area of Manchester, England. The baths opened to the public in 1906 and cost £59,144 to build. Manchester City Council closed the baths in 1993 and the building was left empty. A multimillion-pound restoration project began in 2007. As of 2024, the building is on English Heritage's Heritage at Risk Register.

== History ==
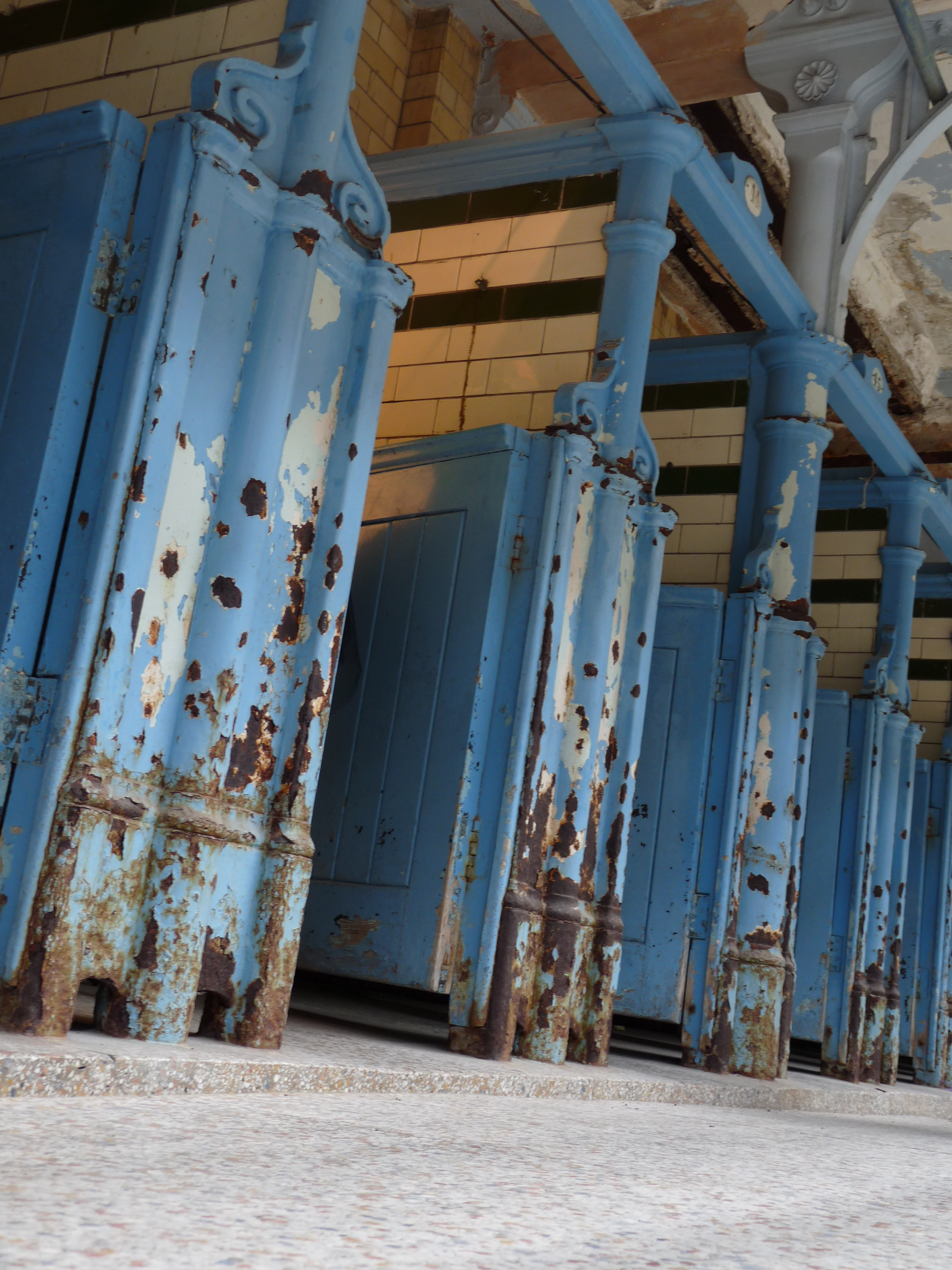
Stalls surrounding the main pool in 2011

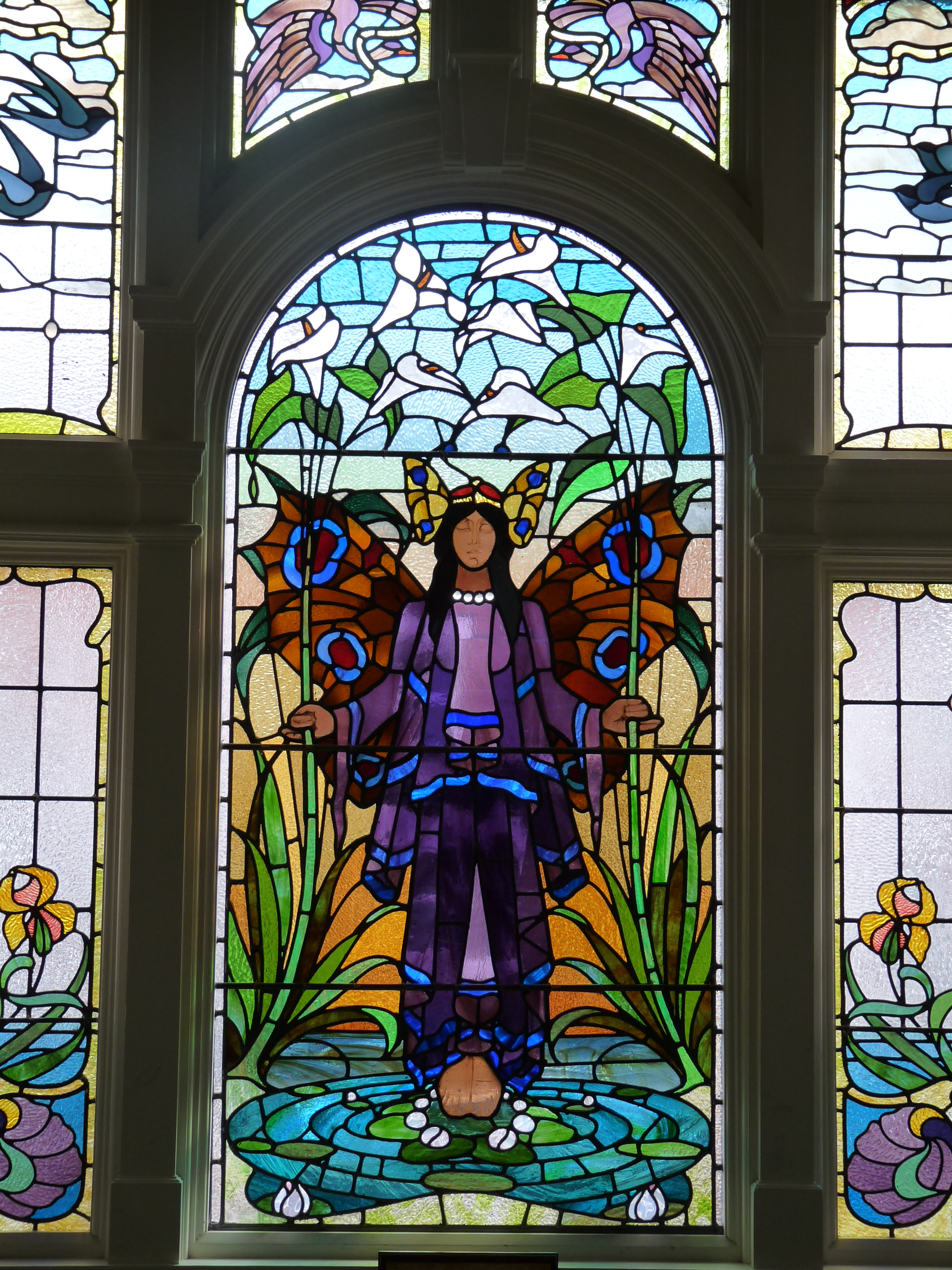
Stained glass window, the "angel of purity" in the Turkish baths

The baths were designed by the city surveyor, T. de Courcy Meade, and his assistant, Arthur Davies. The work was supervised by Henry Price, the newly appointed city architect. The baths were opened in September 1906 by the Lord Mayor of Manchester who described the building as a "water palace". For 87 years the baths provided both essential washing and leisure facilities. Private baths and a laundry were housed there along with three swimming pools and a Victorian-style Turkish bath, later a sauna was added. The main swimming pool was floored over in the winter months to hold dances. In 1952 the Victoria Baths installed the first public Aeratone™ bath (an early type of Jacuzzi™ whirlpool) in the country.

In the design and construction of the baths, a great deal of money was expended, Manchester having at that time one of the world's wealthiest municipal coffers. The façade has multi-coloured brickwork and terracotta decoration, the main interior public spaces are clad in glazed tiles from floor to ceiling and most of the many windows have decorative stained glass.

The baths were closed by Manchester City Council in 1993. The Friends of Victoria Baths was formed and began to investigate the possibility of running the Victoria Baths independently.

Various fundraising attempts failed to bring about a restoration of the baths, although work to prevent further deterioration of the building started in 1998.

=== Restoration ===
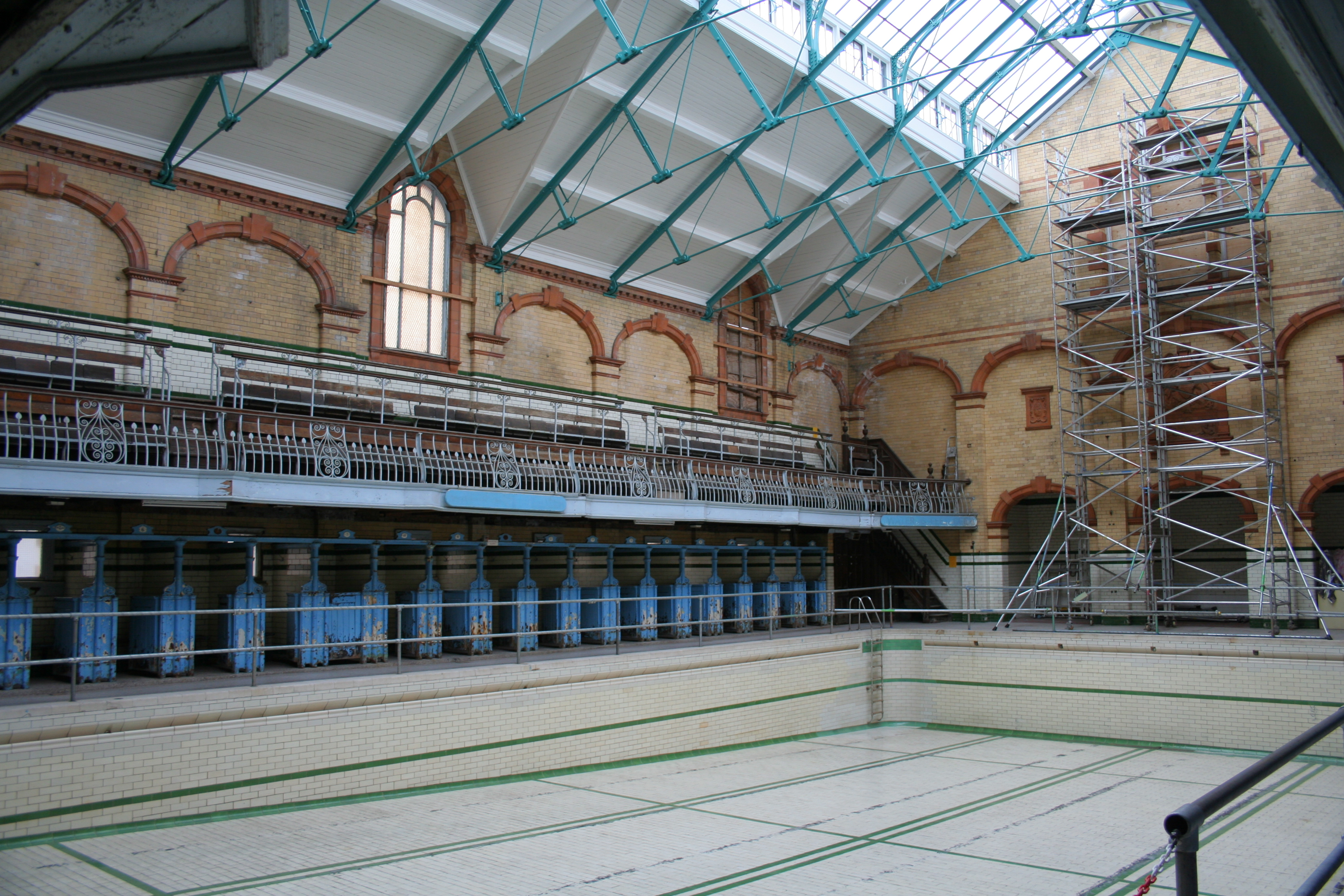
The interior in 2010

In September 2003, the baths won the first series of the BBC's Restoration programme. The building was chosen by a public phone-vote from a shortlist of 10 buildings in danger of dereliction in the UK. It was awarded £3.4 million from the Heritage Lottery Fund and the money raised through the phone-voting process. The Prince of Wales visited the baths a month later to help celebrate the win.

It was intended that the money would be spent on re-opening the Turkish baths by around 2006, with other parts following later at a cost of around £15–20 million. However, the redevelopment plans were dealt a blow one year later when quantity surveyors delivered a much larger estimate of £6.3 million to restore the Turkish baths. The Heritage Lottery Fund requested further details about the full redevelopment before they would hand over any money for the first phase. Final planning approval to begin a restoration process was not received until September 2005.

In September 2006, as part of a number of events to mark the centenary of the building's opening, the gala pool was filled for the first time in 13 years.

The first phase of restoration work consisting of structural work and repairs began on 19 March 2007, and was completed in September 2008. The baths have since become a popular filming location for major television productions, having served as a set for Peaky Blinders, Life on Mars, and other programmes. In 2011 the baths were used as a filming location, a concert venue, and an exhibition centre. On 16 April 2017, the baths were once again reopened for an invite-only acid house dance pool party hosted by Boiler Room, The Warehouse Project, and Fac 51 The Warehouse. This was called "The Other Side of Midnight". The event was also live streamed on YouTube; the video is unlisted.

In September 2024, Anthony Baker was appointed as the new Chief Executive Officer of Victoria Baths, succeeding Elizabeth Sibbering, who had served as Managing Director for ten years.

The building remained on Historic England's Heritage at Risk Register as of 2024.

== See also ==
- Grade II* listed buildings in Greater Manchester
- Listed buildings in Manchester-M13
- Mayfield Baths
