= List of University High School (Los Angeles) alumni =

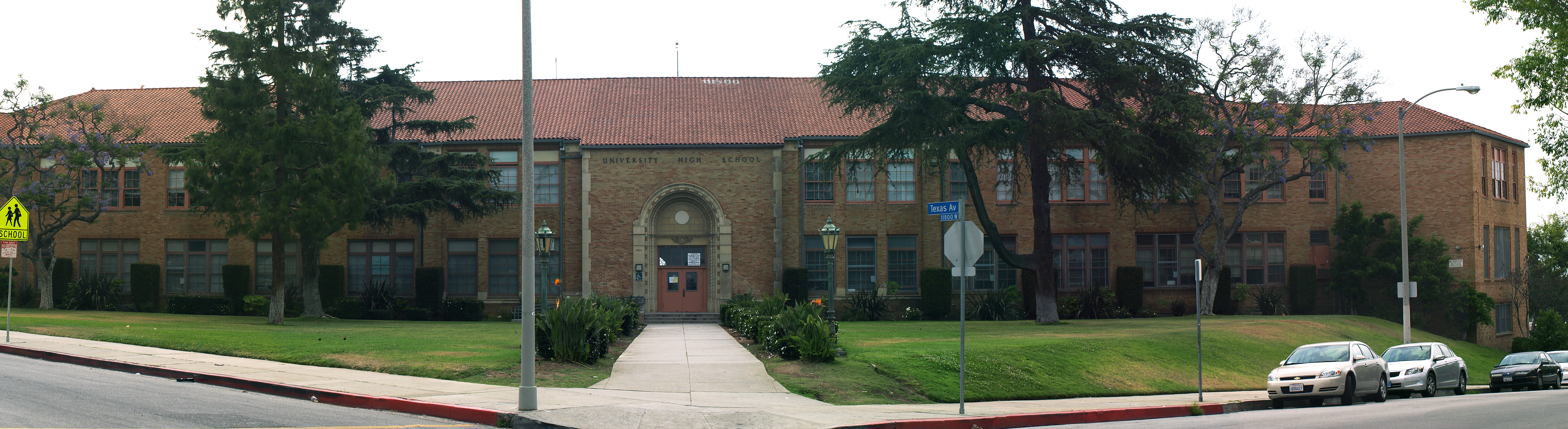
University High School in Los Angeles, California, United States

The following is a list of notable alumni of University Senior High School. The list includes all notable former pupils who attended the school any time since opening its doors in 1924, including the four years it was named "Warren G. Harding High School".

- Rachel Ames, actress, General Hospital, daughter of Byron Foulger and Dorothy Adams
- Thom Andersen, 1960-61, filmmaker, film historian
- Desi Arnaz Jr., actor, son of Desi Arnaz and Lucille Ball
- Michael Asher, conceptual artist
- Mackenzie Astin, 1991, actor
- Eric Avery, rock bassist, Jane's Addiction
- Sondra E. Berchin, 1970, entertainment attorney and executive, MCA Universal
- Jan Berry, 1959, singer and songwriter, Jan and Dean
- Noel Blanc, 1956
- David Bonderman, billionaire
- Karla Bonoff, singer/songwriter, "Someone To Lay Down Beside Me", "Lose Again", "Tell Me Why"
- Jeff Bridges, 1967, Oscar-winning actor
- Susie Bright, author and activist
- James Brolin, actor, Marcus Welby, M.D., Westworld
- Zak Brown 1992, Team Principal, McLaen Racing
- Calmatic, 2005, filmmaker, director
- David Cassidy, actor, The Partridge Family
- David Charvet, 1991, actor, Baywatch
- Alex Cline, 1974, drummer, Homogenized Goo
- Nels Cline, 1974, guitarist, Wilco and the Nels Cline Singers
- Glenn Cowan, table tennis player
- Darby Crash, born Jan Paul Beahm, punk rock pioneer, the Germs
- Faye Dancer, 1941, baseball player
- Richard Dean, born Richard Cowen, athlete, model, photographer
- Sandra Dee, born Alexandra Zuck, 1958, actress, Gidget
- John Densmore, rock drummer, The Doors
- Larry Diamond, sociologist, 1970?
- Pat Doyle, baseball coach
- Bobby Driscoll, Academy Award-winning child star
- Elonka Dunin, 1976, cryptographer and game developer
- John Ecker, 1966, basketball player and coach
- Danny Elfman, 1971, musician, Oingo Boingo, film composer
- Richard Elliot, 1978, musician
- Mark Evanier, 1969, comic book and television writer and historian
- Raymond C. Fisher, jurist
- Vince Flaherty, film producer, actor, songwriter, musician and recording artist
- Megan Follows, 1986, actress
- Kim Fowley, 1958, rock musician, music producer
- Gil Fronsdal, Buddhist teacher and author
- Annette Funicello, 1960, actress, Mickey Mouse Club
- Scott Galloway, professor and podcast host
- Judy Garland, singer, actress, Dorothy in The Wizard of Oz
- Peggy Ann Garner, actress, A Tree Grows in Brooklyn
- Jill Gibson, 1960, singer and artist
- Omar Gooding, actor
- Barry Gordon, 1966, actor, A Thousand Clowns; longest-running president of Screen Actors Guild
- Kim Gordon, rock bassist, Sonic Youth
- Gregory Phillip Grunberg, 1984, actor in Felicity, Heroes, Alias
- Kundy Gutierrez, 1996, 2015-2021 general manager of Mexico's national baseball team
- Robert E. Hall, economist, fellow of the Hoover Institute
- Jane Harman, 1962, congresswoman for California's 36th Congressional District, 1993–99, 2001–11
- Jason Hervey, 1990, actor, Wayne Arnold on The Wonder Years
- Andy Hill, 1968, 3x college national champion basketball player, president of CBS Productions and Channel One News, author, and motivational speaker
- Leonard Hill, television producer and real estate developer
- Daryl Hobbs, 1987, professional football player for Oakland Raiders, New Orleans Saints and Seattle Seahawks
- Tony Horton, professional baseball player for Boston Red Sox, and Cleveland Indians
- Wanda Jackson, film and television actress
- Bruce Johnston, Beach Boys singer-songwriter, Grammy Award winner 1976 for Song of the Year "I Write the Songs"
- Jack Jones, 1956, singer; noted in yearbook as Allan Jones and Allan Jones Jr.
- Ethan Katz (born 1983), pitching coach for the Chicago White Sox
- Brian Kingman, 1971, professional baseball player for Oakland Athletics and San Francisco Giants
- Tom Karp (born 1946), tennis player
- Barry Keenan, 1958, mastermind behind the 1963 kidnapping of fellow University High School graduate Frank Sinatra Jr.
- Werner Klemperer, actor
- Kathy Kohner-Zuckerman, 1958, the actual Gidget, on whom the novel Gidget, The Little Girl With the Big Ideas and subsequent film and television adaptations were based
- Patricia Krenwinkel, convicted murderer, member of Manson family
- Robby Krieger, rock guitarist and songwriter, The Doors
- Bill Lancaster, son of Burt Lancaster; writer of The Bad News Bears
- David Lang, 1974, Pulitzer Prize-winning composer
- Nan Leslie, actress, Martha McGivern on TV series The Californians
- Lorna Luft, 1968-70, singer and actress, daughter of Judy Garland
- Betty Lynn, actress, Thelma Lou in The Andy Griffith Show
- Sue Lyon, actress, Lolita, Night of the Iguana
- Bryan MacLean, 1964, singer/composer, rock musician, Love
- Samantha Mathis, 1988, actress, The American President, Broken Arrow
- Doug McClure, TV and film actor, The Virginian
- Roddy McDowall, born Roderick McDowall, 1946, actor, Planet of the Apes, Cleopatra
- Maria McKee, 1982, rock musician, Lone Justice
- Kevin Millar, professional baseball player
- Penelope Ann Miller, actress, Carlito's Way, Kindergarten Cop
- Andrew Mishkin, 1976, NASA Jet Propulsion Laboratory engineer, author
- Jim Mitchum, actor, The Victors, in Harm's Way; son of Robert Mitchum
- Marilyn Monroe, iconic actress
- Jim Mora, 1953, athlete and coach
- Jim Moret, 1974, television anchor
- Shelley Taylor Morgan, actress
- Mary Murphy, film and television 1950s, '60s, and '70s
- Remi Nadeau, historian, author, City-Makers, The Water Seekers, Ghost Towns and Mining Camps of California
- Dave Navarro, rock musician, Jane's Addiction
- Randy Newman, singer/composer, "I Love L.A."
- Julie Nimoy, producer and director, Remembering Leonard Nimoy
- Barbara Nwaba, 2007, heptathlete
- David Nwaba, 2011, basketball player, Lakers, Cleveland Cavaliers
- Ryan O'Neal, actor, Love Story, Barry Lyndon
- Pepper Paire, 1942, baseball player
- Mel Patton, 1948 Olympic gold medal sprinter; former world record holder, 100 yd & 220 yd dash
- Paul Petersen, actor, The Donna Reed Show
- Vincent Barrett Price, 1958
- Stephen Reinhardt, 1949, judge, United States Court of Appeals for the Ninth Circuit
- Tommy Rettig, 1959, Jeff Miller in Lassie
- Herb Ritts, photographer
- Mary Lee Robb, born Mary Lee Robb Cline, 1944, radio actress, The Great Gildersleeve
- Kira Roessler, Black Flag bassist
- Karly Rothenberg, actress, voice actor, The Office, American Vandal, Archibald’s Next Big Thing, That's So Raven
- Eileen Saki, 1961, actress, played "Rosie" on M*A*S*H*
- Bruce Schwartz, 1973, puppeteer
- Frank Sinatra Jr., singer, conductor, son of Frank Sinatra
- Nancy Sinatra, 1958, singer, actress
- Pat Smear, born George Ruthenberg, punk rock pioneer, the Germs, Nirvana and Foo Fighters musician
- Steve Smith Sr., NFL wide receiver
- Felicia Stewart, doctor, author, advocate for morning-after pill
- Peter Stone, writer for theater, television and film
- Glenn Sundby, gymnast
- Elizabeth Taylor, Oscar-winning actress
- Marshall Thompson, actor, To Hell and Back
- Tone Lōc, born Anthony Terrell Smith, hip-hop artist known for "Wild Thing" and "Funky Cold Medina"
- Dean Torrence, 1958, singer, Jan & Dean
- Peter Viertel, 1937, author, screenwriter, OSS officer
- Jay Walker, NFL quarterback, 1994–1998; Maryland House of Delegates District 26, 2006–present
- David Weissman, documentary filmmaker known for We Were Here and The Cockettes
- Howard Wolpe, 1956, congressman for Michigan's 3rd Congressional District, 1979–1993
- Steve Wynn, musician, songwriter, Dream Syndicate
- Titus Young, NFL wide receiver
- Jordan Zevon, 1988, musician, music producer, son of Warren Zevon
