= Worman =

Worman is a surname. Notable people with the surname include:

- Howard Worman (born 1959), American physician
- Ludwig Worman (1761–1822), American politician
- Martin Worman (1945–1993), American actor
- Nancy Worman (born 1963), American classicist
- Richard Worman (born 1933), American politician
- Rick Worman (born 1963), American football coach
