= Kaliflower Commune =

American utopian community since 1967 - (Friends of Perfection)

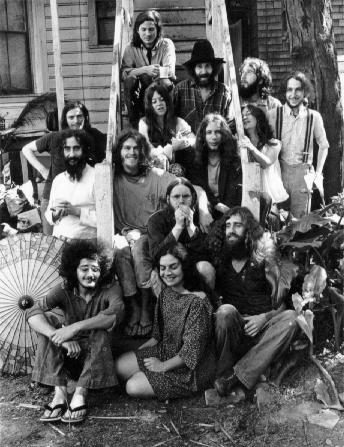
- Established: 1967 (59 years ago)
- Location: San Francisco

The Friends of Perfection Commune is an American Utopian community in San Francisco, California. The commune was founded in 1967 on principles of a common treasury, group marriage, free anonymous art, gay liberation, and selfless service. They were originally called the Sutter/Scott Street commune, and commonly referred to as the Kaliflower commune, after their newsletter of the same name. Because the commune's publishing activities helped spread their philosophy, they became a significant influence on Bay Area culture. Many members of The Angels of Light, a free psychedelic drag theater group, originally lived in the Kaliflower commune. The name Kaliflower referenced the Hindu name for the last and most violent age of humankind, the Kali Yuga.

== Background ==
Communes played an integral part of the 1960s American hippie movement. Members of the 1960s counterculture movement created communes as a way to survive outside the hegemonic system and to resist the boredom of enforced heterosexuality, the Vietnam War, capitalism, racism, mass media, and the government.

The Kaliflower commune was founded on the spiritual and economic principles of the SF Diggers: shared resources, free labor, fun, and the liberation of culture from commercialism. The commune's members were also inspired by John Humphrey Noyes, founder of the Oneida Community (a perfectionist religious communal society that existed in New York in the 1840s) and his book, History of American Socialisms, to embrace practices of group marriage, mutual criticism, and selfless service.

Cofounder Irving Rosenthal created the Free Print Shop, a print shop in the commune basement, as a platform for uncensored, radical, free publishing in the Bay Area.

== Origins ==
Irving Rosenthal (1930–2022) was a writer and editor from San Francisco. He studied at the University of Chicago in the late 1950s where he was an editor of the Chicago Review. There he edited and published many Beat writers including Jack Kerouac, Edward Dahlberg, and William Burroughs; but Rosenthal and most of the staff quit the Chicago Review in 1959 after the University attempted to censor an issue of the Review because it included material from William Burroughs′ then-unpublished novel Naked Lunch . To publish the disputed material they cofounded a literary review called Big Table, which was immediately charged with obscenity by the U.S. Postal Department. However, Rosenthal eventually won the case, which Judge Julius Hoffman adjudicated. Rosenthal then moved to New York City, where he continued to edit and publish Beat writers before moving to San Francisco in 1967 with the intention of setting up his own commune free of censorship. He was joined by Hibiscus (a founder of psychedelic free theater groups The Cockettes and the Angels of Light) in starting the commune. Members of the SF Diggers helped transport his printing press from New York to start the Free Print Shop.

== Commune culture ==
The Kaliflower spirit was one of communalism and cooperation. Many members saw their commune as their family. In one issue of Kaliflower, commune members wrote, "Nuclear family members don't usually buy and sell to each other, are in fact communistic, and we wanted nuclear family intimacy among the communes". It was common for commune members to limit relationships with non-communalist friends. Members gave their savings to the group and were encouraged to quit outside jobs and work inside the community instead. Commune tasks included research, gardening, cleaning, cooking, running the Free Print Shop, maintaining a free store, or delivering the newsletter or food to other communes.

The community supported a culture of polyamory, resisting attachments to a single sexual partner. Many members slept in a group bedroom and regularly shared sexual partners, participating in what they considered to be a group marriage.

Major decisions were made by consensus within the daily meeting of committed community members. The commune also held voluntary mutual criticism sessions where members could express issues with each other in a neutral setting. During such a session, the member requesting criticism would invite other members to participate, and then listen in silence while concerns & criticisms were aired. Customarily the member did not respond for three days. This system of self-governance was borrowed from the 19th-century American Utopian community at Oneida, NY.

=== Publication ===
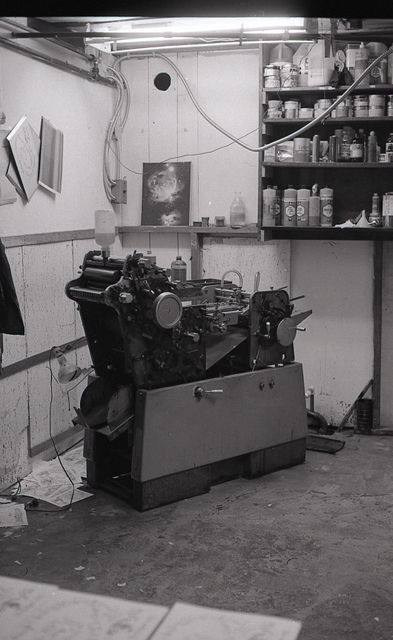
The Chief 15 offset located in the Free Print Shop in the basement of the Kaliflower Commune

Rosenthal brought his printing press to the commune basement, and the space became known as the Free Print Shop, a free, underground publishing venue for Bay Area communes. The flyer for the opening of the Free Print Shop announced, "The Sutter Street Commune invites you to submit manuscripts, drawings, manifestos to our Free Print Shop. Free distribution guaranteed for whatever we print." From then on, the Free Print Shop produced hundreds of publication including books, pamphlets, and flyers (for free services, ecology groups, political protests, announcements for free events), Food Conspiracy order sheets, and Free Medical Clinic prescription forms.

Starting in April 1969, members of the group worked in the print shop to create Kaliflower, the free, inter-communal newsletter. The newsletter was published weekly between April 1969 and December 1971, & at longer intervals through the present. The name was a play on Kali Yuga, the Hindu name for the last and most violent age of humankind, the idea being that the publication was "a step toward a seed of positivity growing out of the age of destruction." The publication's readership grew quickly. After three years, it was delivered to more than 300 communes in the Bay Area, eventually becoming so well known that the commune itself became known as Kaliflower. Every Thursday became known as "Kaliflower Day," the day on which Kaliflower was bound and distributed. Each issue of Kaliflower was printed in-house and bound by hand using the Japanese method of overstitching yarn on either the top or side.

The newsletter began as a "inter-communal bulletin board" and became a vital mode of communication amongst the communes. It listed items that one commune needed or had to offer; upcoming free events; announcements, free ads, and how-to and skill sharing articles. For instance, one article from November 20, 1970 contained articles on how to build cold boxes to grow food and a recipe for squash soup. One from December 10, 1970 had an article titled "Yoga Nazal Cleaning" and information on herbal hair care. Over time, it came to offer a broader range of information about collective living including historical context for communalism and utopianism, often citing information from the Revivalist communes in the 1820s and 1840s, most notably the Oneida Commune of John Humphrey Noyes.

== Free Food Conspiracy ==
The Free Food Conspiracy (later named the Free Food Family) was organized in 1968, in part by Kaliflower members. The organization was one of the original food conspiracies, groups that pooled food stamps and other resources from participating communes and bought food in bulk which they distributed to participants on the basis of need. By pooling resources, early food co-ops like the Free Food Conspiracy saved shopping time and provided high quality food for low bulk prices. By 1973, the organization reached over 150 communes, saving money and increasing cooperation between the communes. Kaliflower expressed hope that one day local communes would eventually pool enough resources to buy property and land; however the Free Food Conspiracy disbanded in 1973 due to resistance against giving up "imported cheeses and health food extravagances" in exchange for a more basic diet.

=== Free Food Conspiracy legacy ===
Congress saw the Free Food Conspiracy and other resource-sharing plans like it as abuses of welfare. Nixon attempted to restrict organizations like the Free Food Conspiracy from receiving food stamps by changing eligibility requirements to limit households of unrelated people (ie. Communes). This new eligibility requirement was struck down by the Supreme Court of the United States under the equal protection provision of the 5th Amendment in USDA v. Moreno.

Although the Free Food Conspiracy disbanded in 1973, the organization spurred the creation of many food co-ops as people saw the benefits of organizing wholesale buying operations. The Free Food Conspiracy was a predecessor of many anti-capitalist resource sharing programs including other cooperative food systems, bicycle repair workshops, community gardens, and farmers' markets. It inspired the Food Not Bombs program, an all-volunteer-run global movement that shares free vegan meals as a protest to war and poverty. The Free Food Conspiracy also gave rise to the Really Really Free Market, a movement of temporary markets based on the gift economy where participants bring unneeded items, food, and skills like haircuts to a community space to share with other participants with the principle of countering capitalism.

== Impact ==
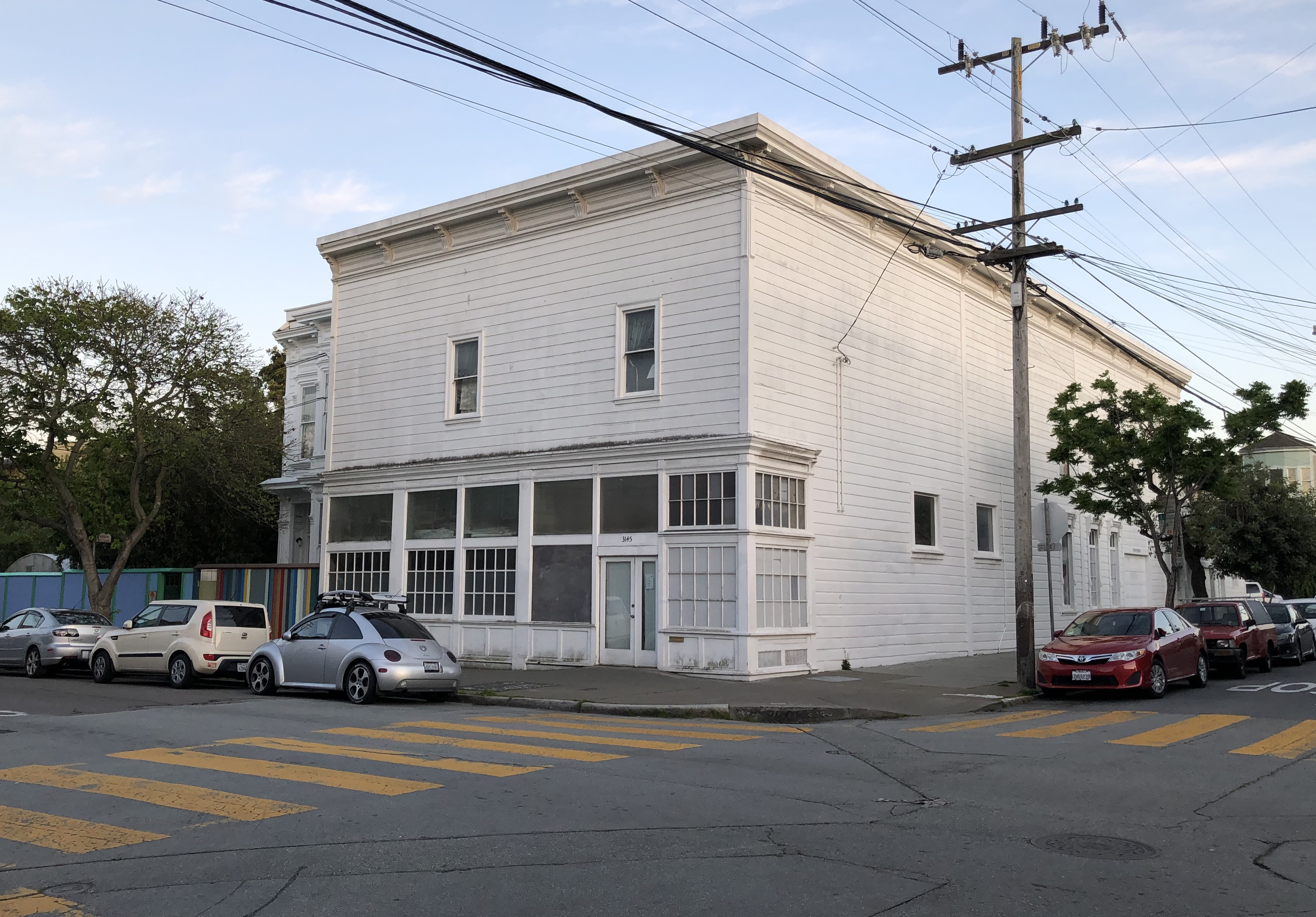
Rebirth and Development, 2019

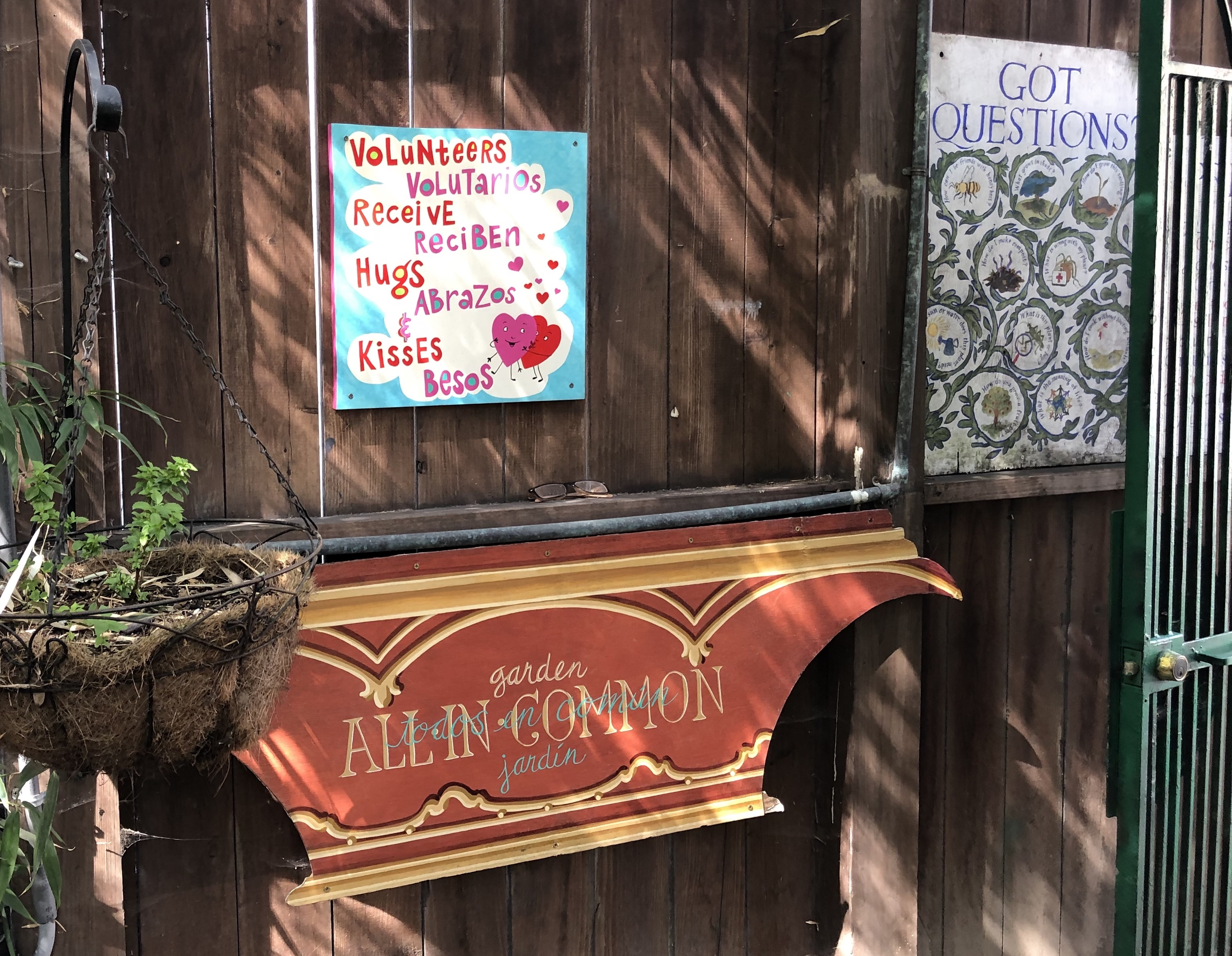
All in Common Garden, 2019

Kaliflower helped create the culture of Haight-Ashbury and the San Francisco hippie movement during the 1970s. The commune that produced the newsletter influenced the formation, structure, and principles of many other communes including The House of Love and Prayer and the One Mind Temple (which became the St. John Coltrane Church). Its existence continues to inspire the creation of other utopian, anti-capitalist communes and resource-sharing groups with similar values.

In 1974, the commune moved to the Mission District. As of 2025, it continues to publish Kaliflower, produce free art, and host services such as a free food pantry, referrals to free services, and a free community garden. The community garden (All in Common Garden) supports the Free Farm Stand on Sundays at Parque Niños Unidos at 23rd and Treat Streets, which was started by a person who was part of the commune.

== Representation in media ==
The commune is referenced in The Cockettes, a film by David Weissman and Bill Weber about a psychedelic, San Francisco based, gender-bending theater group founded by Hibiscus, one of the first members of the commune.

The commune is mentioned in The Fabulous Sylvester: The Legend, the Music, the Seventies in San Francisco, a biography by Joshua Gamson about the life of Sylvester, a queer, American singer and performer popular for his disco music. Sylvester did not live in the commune, but another cofounder of the Cockettes, Hibiscus, was a member.
