= Martin Worman =

American dramatist

Martin Worman (July 19, 1945 – November 25, 1993) was an actor, playwright, lyricist, director, female impersonator, activist and academic, working in the United States, primarily in San Francisco and New York City from the late 1960s through the early 1990s. He is most known for being a member of the psychedelic San Francisco drag troupe, The Cockettes. Later, he wrote a rock opera and worked in theater, both in San Francisco and (after 1979) in New York City. He is a 1967 graduate of Rutgers University and studied and then taught at New York University, where he wrote his dissertation about The Cockettes and was a mentor to Anohni, later the leader of Antony and the Johnsons. In 1992 he went to Antioch College in Ohio to start a regional theatre company; he died of AIDS in Dayton, Ohio on November 25, 1993.

Worman's papers, including voluminous research on the history of The Cockettes, served as a basis for a documentary and book about the group. and were later acquired by the New York Public Library for the Performing Arts.

== See also ==
- The Cockettes, 2002 documentary
