= Dorian Awards =

Film, television and New York stage accolades given by GALECA

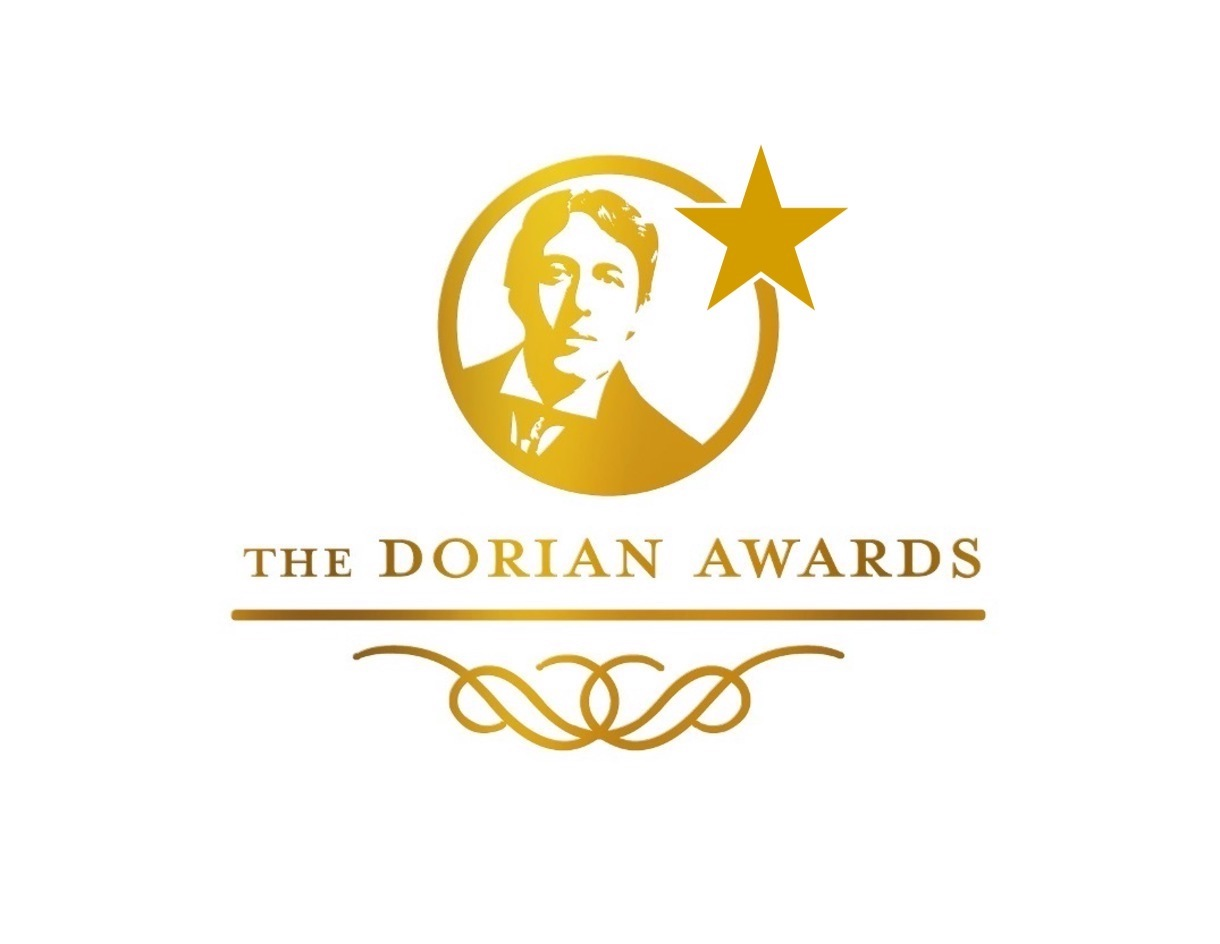
- Country: United States; United Kingdom; Canada; Australia
- Presented by: GALECA: The Society of LGBTQ Entertainment Critics
- First award: 2009; 17 years ago
- Website: galeca.org

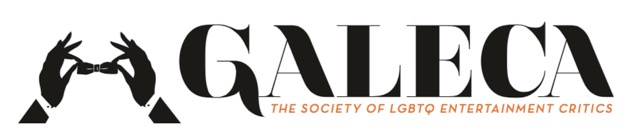
GALECA revised its full name to The Society of LGBTQ Entertainment Critics in 2017.

The Dorian Awards are general and LGBTQ-themed accolades for excellence in film, television and Broadway / Off-Broadway, as voted by the members of GALECA: The Society of LGBTQ Entertainment Critics. GALECA is an association of professional journalists and critics who regularly report on movies, TV and/or New York City stage productions for print, online, and broadcast outlets mainly in the United States, United Kingdom, Canada, and Australia. The group was founded in 2009 as the Gay and Lesbian Entertainment Critics Association. As of December 2025, the organization listed approximately 570 members, including those on its advisory board.

The Dorian Award is named in honor of Oscar Wilde, in reference to the main character from his novel The Picture of Dorian Gray, and the honor's logo includes an illustration of Wilde.

Various versions of the physical award over the years include a framed certificate, a giant cue-card, and a small canvas print showing an illustrated portrait of the winner or a memorable scene from the awarded project. During GALECA's Dorians Film Toast 2021 (airing April 18, 2021 on the streaming platform Revry), actress Carey Mulligan, in accepting the group's Best Actress award for her work in Promising Young Woman, said her Dorian "might be the coolest prize I've ever seen."

== Format ==
The Dorian Awards honor film, television and Broadway / Off-Broadway productions at separate times of the year. Dorian film nominees and winners for the previous calendar year are announced in January and February, while TV nominees and winners for the previous television season are typically announced in June and August. The Dorian Theater Awards were added in 2023, with a separate wing of the society consisting of 31 members announcing its inaugural winners June 1 of that year.

In addition to more traditional categories such as Film of the Year and Best TV Comedy, the Dorians include more novel categories, including Unsung TV Show, Visually Striking Film, Wilde Wit, and Campy Flick, an honor that has generated amusement from The New York Times.

Rather than present an official awards ceremony, GALECA typically hosts its annual "Dorian Awards Winners Toast", an informal day party in Los Angeles for members, winners, nominees, and associates. For the 2020 Toast, Antonio Banderas, the group's choice for 2019 Film Performance of the Year—Actor, and actress-director Olivia Wilde, director of GALECA's Unsung Film of the Year winner Booksmart, were among the honored guests.

In September 2020, GALECA presented its first televised awards, Dorians TV Toast 2020, a pre-recorded two-hour special on Revry with appearances by performers and producers including Hugh Jackman, Janelle Monáe, Billy Porter, Margaret Cho, Josh Thomas, Regina King, Dan Levy, Laverne Cox, John Oliver, Chad Michaels, Thomas Roberts, Fiona Shaw, Annie Murphy, Alex Newell, and Damon Lindelof. The program, shown on LGBTQ+ streaming platform Revry, was hosted by broadcasting veteran and LGBTQ rights activist Charles Karel Bouley, and included segments where he and other GALECA members discussed the merits of the contenders in various categories.

Bouley, known simply as Karel, also hosted the group's Dorians Film Toast 2021, this time a three-hour special featuring Carey Mulligan, Daniel Kaluuya, Chloé Zhao, Lee Daniels George C. Wolfe, Radha Blank, Lee Isaac Chung, Cynthia Nixon, Gabourey Sidibe, Rachel McAdams, Isabel Sandoval, Colman Domingo, Rafael L. Silva, Harry Hamlin, Jesse Tyler Ferguson, Deven Green, Leslie Jordan, Emerald Fennell, California governor Gavin Newsom, Charo, Cox, Michaels, and other stars. "Wilde Artist" recipient Dolly Parton did not appear in the show to accept that special award ("to a truly ground-breaking force in film, theater, and/or television"), but said in a statement: "I'm not sure I'm as edgy as past winners (in the Wilde Artist category) like Todd Haynes, Kate McKinnon, Lin-Manuel Miranda, and Jordan Peele — but I am honored and humbled. I appreciate all of you entertainment journalists who are so passionate and are working so hard. Keep up the good work!"

A third awards special, Dorians TV Toast 2021, streamed on Here TV and its YouTube channel Planet Out, and later on-demand on Tubi. Patricia Arquette, Bowen Yang, Jean Smart, Ziwe, Jennifer Beals, Michaela Jaé Rodriguez, Stephen Fry, Nick Kroll, Olivia Newton-John, Tituss Burgess, Fran Drescher, Michael Cimino, Josie Totah, Big Freedia, Russell T Davies, Gottmik, Callum Scott Howells, Steven Canals, Hannah Einbinder, Jim J. Bullock, Jeffrey Bowyer-Chapman, Paapa Essiedu, Paul W. Downs, Jesse James Keitel, and Eurovision Song Contest host Edsilia Rombley were among the participants. In a unique moment, actor-comedian John Lehr impersonated gay cable news polling expert Steve Kornacki in presenting three categories.

== Membership ==
Honorary GALECA members and advisors include or have included former film critics David Ansen and Kevin Thomas, lesbian journalist Judy Wieder (former editor-in-chief of The Advocate), broadcasting veteran Jane Velez-Mitchell, columnist Michael Musto, former Jezebel editor-in-chief and Teen Vogue online executive editor Koa Beck, Princeton University Dean of the College and feminist writer Jill Dolan, noted film critic and talk show host Bobby Rivers, and professor of literature Joseph Bristow, one of the world's leading authorities on Oscar Wilde.

GALECA members who've authored new books on entertainment are occasionally interviewed by other members on the group's YouTube channel. Some of the authors who've participated are Tre'vell Anderson (We See Each Other: A Black, Trans Journey Through TV and Film), Kristen Lopez (But Have You Read the Book? 52 Literary Gems That Inspired Our Favorite Films), Michael Schulman (Oscar Wars), Matt Baume (Hi Honey, I'm Homo) and Kyle Turner (The Queer Film Guide: 100 great movies that tell LGBTQIA+ stories).

The channel also features members' interviews with Hollywood and New York stage creatives doing work the organization deems somehow special. Among the subjects: Kristen Wiig, Ricky Martin, Dominic Burgess and the creators of the Apple TV+ comedy Palm Royale; the stars and creators of Netflix's Dead Boy Detectives; and Longtime Companion cast members Bruce Davison, Dermot Mulroney and Stephen Caffrey alongside screenwriter Craig Lucas.

In addition, members' individual talks with such group "heroes" as Ziwe Fumudoh, Trace Lysette and Wilson Cruz are also presented.

== "Ten Best" lists ==
To commemorate the 2015 film and TV awards season, GALECA revealed its first "Ten Best" list, The Ten Best Movies About the Academy Awards. Included were such films as The Oscar, California Suite, For Your Consideration, and The Bodyguard. More recently, the group's lists include the Ten Best LGBTQ Movies Every Straight Person Should See, Ten Best Actresses of All Time, and Ten Best Films You Didn't Know Were LGBTQ.

In 2024, GALECA announced the group's choices for America's 10 Best TV News Journalists, praising the work of such on-air figures as CNN anchors Christiane Amanpour and Kaitlan Collins, NBC News reporter Jacob Soboroff, ABC News' David Muir and Robin Roberts, and Mehdi Hasan.

== Dorians Toast theme songs ==
Four original songs have been written for GALECA's Dorian Awards Toast streaming specials: "Look Into the Light", a pop ballad about the power of movies, and "A Toast!," both sung by Morgan Mallory and written and composed by Mallory and Charles Karel Bouley; an expanded, faster-paced variation on the latter performed by Dave Rooney of The Black Donnellys with additional lyrics by Bouley and Rooney; and "Flickering Life", a pop rock tune about the power of TV also composed and sung by Mallory with lyrics by him and Bouley.

== History ==
GALECA and its annual Dorian Awards were created in 2008 in Hollywood, California, by John Griffiths, former long-time television critic for Us Weekly magazine and contributor to Emmy Magazine of the Academy of Television Arts & Sciences. Griffiths was the nonprofit's Executive Director until 2025, when Diane Anderson-Minshall took over the role. Current and past elected board members include former Pride Media CEO Anderson-Minshall, Pulitzer Prize winner Walt Hickey, Variety editor Jazz Tangcay, and The New York Times columnist Trish Bendix.

The first Dorian Awards, for the 2009's best in both film and TV, were announced in January 2010 (nominees were revealed the previous month). GALECA's Dorian Award film and TV nominees and winners for 2010 productions were announced in January 2011. Following suit, 2011's Dorian Award nominees and ultimate honorees were revealed in January 2012. The Dorian nominees and winners for 2012 productions were announced in January 2013, and so on.

In 2018, the group separated its film and TV awards' timelines, with Dorian movie award winners revealed each February and TV honors in August.

In 2019, GALECA joined forces with the African-American Film Critics Association, Latino Entertainment Journalists Association (LEJA), the entertainment and features arm of the Asian American Journalists Association, the Online Association of Female Film Critics, and Time's Up Entertainment's CRITICAL initiative to form Critics Groups for Equality in Media (CGEM), to promote diversity in journalism. Time's Up, enmeshed in controversy, eventually dropped out of the alliance ahead of ceasing its programs in January 2023.

Due to COVID-19 pandemic's effects on the film business, for its 2021 film awards, GALECA adjusted its window of eligibility to movies released in 2020 and the first two months of 2021. The 2022 Dorian film awards considered movies released in the remaining months of 2021. In that two-year period, award contenders vied for "Best Film" rather than "Film of the Year," which the group restored in 2023.

Also in 2023, GALECA introduced the Crimson Honors, a college journalism contest for aspiring film and TV critics, focused on elevating female and nonbinary students of color in the LGBTQ community. The critics' reviews aggregate Rotten Tomatoes provided scholarship funds to three winners. GALECA broadened the contest's eligibility to LGBTQ students in general for its 2025 scholarship, with the organization this time providing prize funds itself.

== Theater Wing ==
In 2023, GALECA launched the Dorian Theater Awards, voted upon by members in the group who regularly critique, report on or assign coverage of Broadway and Off-Broadway stage productions. The contingent named honorees and two finalists per category that first year, and moved to first announcing nominees and then winners in 2024.

In 2025, GALECA's theater wing counted over 40 members, including Naveen Kumar of The Washington Post, HuffPost's Curtis Wong, Abbey White of The Hollywood Reporter, and Michael Schulman of The New Yorker.

== Winners ==
The below lists of film, TV and Broadway/Off-Broadway Dorian winners over the years do not include all the nominees or finalists in each category.

== Dorian Film and TV Awards ==
=== 2025-26 (Television) ===
Sources -

Category	Winner
TV Drama of the Year	Heated Rivalry
TV Comedy of the Year	Hacks
Best TV Movie or Limited Series	Half Man
Best Written Show	Hacks
Best LGBTQ TV Show	Heated Rivalry
Best Non-English Language TV Show	Squid Game
Best LGBTQ Non-English Language TV Show	The Boyfriend
Best Unsung Show	Boots
Best TV Performance—Drama	Rhea Seehorn, Pluribus
Best Supporting TV Performance—Drama	François Arnaud, Heated Rivalry
Best TV Performance—Comedy	Jean Smart, Hacks
Best Supporting TV Performance—Comedy	Kate O'Flynn, Widow's Bay
Best TV Musical Performance	Bad Bunny, The Apple Music Super Bowl LX halftime show
Best TV Documentary or Documentary Series	Mr. Scorsese
Best LGBTQ TV Documentary or Documentary Series	Lilith Fair: Building a Mystery
Best Current Affairs Show	The Late Show With Stephen Colbert
Best Genre TV Show	Widow's Bay
Best Animated Show	South Park
Best Reality Show	The Traitors
Most Visually Striking Show (TIE)	Alien: Earth; Pluribus
Campiest TV Show	The Hunting Wives
Wilde Wit of the Year (honoring a performer, writer, or commentator whose observations both challenge and amuse)	Hannah Einbinder
GALECA TV Icon Award	Lisa Kudrow
GALECA LGBTQIA+ TV Trailblazer Award (for creating art that inspires empathy, truth and equity)	Jacob Tierney

=== 2026 (Film) ===
Sources -

Category	Winner
Film of the Year	Sinners
LGBTQ Film of the Year	Pillion
Non-English Language Film of the Year	Sentimental Value
LGBTQ Non-English Language Film of the Year	Misericordia
Unsung Film of the Year	Twinless
Unsung LGBTQ Film of the Year	Peter Hujar's Day
Director of the Year	Ryan Coogler – Sinners
Screenplay of the Year (original or adapted)	Sinners
Best LGBTQ Screenplay (original or adapted)	Sorry, Baby
Best Film Performance	Rose Byrne – If I Had Legs, I'd Kick You
Best Supporting Film Performance	Amy Madigan – Weapons
Best Documentary	The Perfect Neighbor
Best LGBTQ Documentary	Come See Me in the Good Light
Most Visually Striking Film	Sinners
Best Animated Film	KPop Demon Hunters
Genre Film of the Year	Sinners
Best Film Music	Sinners
"We're Wilde About You!" Rising Star	Eva Victor
Wilde Artist Award (to a truly groundbreaking force in film, theatre and/or television)	Ryan Coogler
Campiest Flick	Weapons
Timeless Star (to an actor or performer whose exemplary career is marked by character, wisdom and wit)	Tim Curry
GALECA LGBTQIA+ Film Trailblazer (for creating art that inspires empathy, truth and equity)	Gregg Araki

=== 2024-25 (Television) ===
Sources -

Category	Winner
TV Drama of the Year	The Pitt
TV Comedy of the Year	Hacks
Best TV Movie or Limited Series	Adolescence
Best Written Show	Hacks
Best LGBTQ TV Show	Hacks
Best Non-English Language TV Show	Squid Game
Best LGBTQ Non-English Language TV Show	Elite
Best Unsung Show	Overcompensating
Best TV Performance—Drama	Noah Wyle, The Pitt
Best Supporting TV Performance—Drama	Tramell Tillman, Severance
Best TV Performance—Comedy	Jean Smart, Hacks
Best Supporting TV Performance—Comedy	Hannah Einbinder, Hacks
Best TV Musical Performance	Cynthia Erivo and Ariana Grande, "Wicked" medley, 97th Academy Awards
Best TV Documentary or Documentary Series	Pee Wee as Himself
Best LGBTQ TV Documentary or Documentary Series	Pee Wee as Himself
Best Current Affairs Show	Last Week Tonight with John Oliver
Best Genre TV Show	Andor
Best Animated Show	Harley Quinn
Best Reality Show	The Traitors
Most Visually Striking Show	Severance
Campiest TV Show	The Traitors
Wilde Wit of the Year (honoring a performer, writer, or commentator whose observations both challenge and amuse)	Cole Escola
GALECA TV Icon Award	Jean Smart
GALECA LGBTQIA+ TV Trailblazer Award (for creating art that inspires empathy, truth and equity)	Ncuti Gatwa

=== 2025 (Film) ===
Sources -

Category	Winner
Film of the Year	The Substance
LGBTQ Film of the Year	I Saw the TV Glow
Non-English Language Film of the Year	I'm Still Here
LGBTQ Non-English Language Film of the Year	Emilia Pérez
Unsung Film of the Year	Problemista
Director of the Year	Coralie Fargeat – The Substance
Screenplay of the Year (original or adapted)	Challengers
Best LGBTQ Screenplay (original or adapted)	I Saw the TV Glow
Best Film Performance	Demi Moore – The Substance
Best Supporting Film Performance	Ariana Grande – Wicked
Best Documentary	Will & Harper
Best LGBTQ Documentary	Will & Harper
Most Visually Striking Film	Nickel Boys
Best Animated Film	Flow
Genre Film of the Year	The Substance
Best Film Music	Challengers
"We're Wilde About You!" Rising Star	Jonathan Bailey
Wilde Artist Award (to a truly groundbreaking force in film, theatre and/or television)	Colman Domingo
Campiest Flick	The Substance
Timeless Star (to an actor or performer whose exemplary career is marked by character, wisdom and wit)	Demi Moore
GALECA LGBTQIA+ Film Trailblazer (for creating art that inspires empathy, truth and equity)	Cynthia Erivo

=== 2023-24 (Television) ===
Sources -

Category	Winner
TV Drama of the Year	Anne Rice's Interview with the Vampire
TV Comedy of the Year	Hacks
Best TV Movie or Limited Series	Baby Reindeer
Best Written Show	Hacks
Best LGBTQ TV Show	Anne Rice's Interview with the Vampire
Best Non-English Language TV Show	Shōgun
Best LGBTQ Non-English Language TV Show	Young Royals
Best Unsung Show	Reservation Dogs
Best TV Performance—Drama	Matt Bomer, Fellow Travelers
Best Supporting TV Performance—Drama	Jonathan Bailey, Fellow Travelers
Best TV Performance—Comedy	Jean Smart, Hacks
Best Supporting TV Performance—Comedy	Hannah Einbinder, Hacks
Best TV Musical Performance	Ryan Gosling, "I'm Just Ken," 96th Academy Awards
Best TV Documentary or Documentary Series	Quiet on Set: The Dark Side of Kids TV
Best LGBTQ TV Documentary or Documentary Series	Last Call: When a Serial Killer Stalked Queer New York
Best Current Affairs Show	Last Week Tonight with John Oliver
Best Genre TV Show	Anne Rice's Interview with the Vampire
Best Animated Show	X-Men '97
Best Reality Show	The Traitors
Most Visually Striking Show	Ripley
Campiest TV Show	Chucky
Wilde Wit of the Year (honoring a performer, writer, or commentator whose observations both challenge and amuse)	Julio Torres
GALECA TV Icon Award	Carol Burnett
GALECA LGBTQIA+ TV Trailblazer Award (for creating art that inspires empathy, truth and equity)	Alan Cumming

=== 2024 (Film) ===
Sources -

Category	Winner
Film of the Year	All of Us Strangers
LGBTQ Film of the Year	All of Us Strangers
Non-English Language Film of the Year	Anatomy of a Fall
LGBTQ Non-English Language Film of the Year	Anatomy of a Fall
Unsung Film of the Year	Are You There God? It's Me, Margaret.
Director of the Year	Greta Gerwig – Barbie
Screenplay of the Year (original or adapted)	Samy Burch, May December
Best LGBTQ Screenplay (original or adapted)	Andrew Haigh, All of Us Strangers
Best Film Performance	Lily Gladstone – Killers of the Flower Moon
Best Supporting Film Performance	Charles Melton – May December
Best Documentary	Kokomo City
Best LGBTQ Documentary	Kokomo City
Most Visually Striking Film	Poor Things
Best Animated Film	The Boy and the Heron
Genre Film of the Year	Poor Things
Best Film Music	Barbie
"We're Wilde About You!" Rising Star	Ayo Edebiri
Wilde Artist Award (to a truly groundbreaking force in film, theatre and/or television)	Todd Haynes
Campiest Flick	M3GAN
Timeless Star (to an actor or performer whose exemplary career is marked by character, wisdom and wit)	Jodie Foster
GALECA LGBTQIA+ Film Trailblazer (for creating art that inspires empathy, truth and equity)	Colman Domingo

=== 2022-23 (Television) ===
Sources -

Category	Winner
TV Drama of the Year	Succession
TV Comedy of the Year	Abbott Elementary
Best TV Movie or Limited Series	Fire Island
Best LGBTQ TV Show	The Other Two
Best Non-English Language TV Show	Los Espookys
Best Unsung Show	Somebody Somewhere
Best TV Performance—Drama	Sarah Snook, Succession
Best Supporting TV Performance—Drama	Jennifer Coolidge, The White Lotus
Best TV Performance—Comedy	Bridget Everett, Somebody Somewhere
Best Supporting TV Performance—Comedy	Ayo Edebiri, The Bear
Best TV Musical Performance	Ariana DeBose, "Angela Bassett Did the Thing," 76th British Academy Film Awards
Best TV Documentary or Documentary Series	Queer for Fear: The History of Queer Horror
Best LGBTQ TV Documentary or Documentary Series	Queer for Fear: The History of Queer Horror
Best Current Affairs Show	Ziwe
Best Animated Show	Harley Quinn
Best Reality Show	Jury Duty
Most Visually Striking Show	The Last of Us
Campiest TV Show	Schmigadoon!
Wilde Wit of the Year (honoring a performer, writer, or commentator whose observations both challenge and amuse)	Wanda Sykes
GALECA TV Icon Award	Jennifer Coolidge
GALECA LGBTQIA+ TV Trailblazer Award (for creating art that inspires empathy, truth and equity)	Elliot Page

=== 2023 (Film) ===
Sources -

Category	Winner
Film of the Year	Everything Everywhere All at Once
LGBTQ Film of the Year	Everything Everywhere All at Once
Best Non-English Language Film	RRR
Best Unsung Film	Aftersun
Best Director	Daniel Kwan and Daniel Scheinert, aka Daniels – Everything Everywhere All at Once
Best Screenplay (original or adapted)	Daniel Kwan and Daniel Scheinert, aka Daniels – Everything Everywhere All at Once
Best Film Performance	Michelle Yeoh – Everything Everywhere All at Once
Best Supporting Film Performance	Ke Huy Quan – Everything Everywhere All at Once
Best Documentary	All the Beauty and the Bloodshed
Best LGBTQ Documentary	All the Beauty and the Bloodshed
Most Visually Striking Film	Everything Everywhere All at Once
Best Animated Film	Marcel the Shell with Shoes On
Best Film Music	Hildur Guðnadóttir – Tár
"We're Wilde About You!" Rising Star	Stephanie Hsu
Wilde Artist Award (to a truly groundbreaking force in film, theatre and/or television)	Michelle Yeoh
Campiest Flick	Pearl
Timeless Star (to an actor or performer whose exemplary career is marked by character, wisdom and wit)	Nathan Lane
GALECA LGBTQIA+ Film Trailblazer (for creating art that inspires empathy, truth and equity)	Janelle Monáe

=== 2021-22 (Television) ===
Sources -

Category	Winner
TV Drama of the Year	Yellowjackets
TV Comedy of the Year	Abbott Elementary
Best TV Movie or Limited Series	The White Lotus
Best LGBTQ TV Show	Heartstopper
Best Non-English Language TV Show	Squid Game
Best Unsung Show	The Other Two
Best TV Performance	Melanie Lynskey, Yellowjackets
Best Supporting TV Performance	Jennifer Coolidge, The White Lotus
Best TV Musical Performance	Beyoncé, "Be Alive," 94th Academy Awards
Best TV Documentary or Documentary Series	The Andy Warhol Diaries
Best Current Affairs Show	Ziwe
Best Animated Show	Bob's Burgers
Best Reality Show	RuPaul's Drag Race
Most Visually Striking Show	Euphoria
Campiest TV Show	Girls5eva
Wilde Wit of the Year (honoring a performer, writer, or commentator whose observations both challenge and amuse)	Jennifer Coolidge
GALECA TV Icon Award (TIE)	Christine Baranski; Cassandra Peterson
GALECA LGBTQIA+ TV Trailblazer Award (for creating art that inspires empathy, truth and equity)	Jerrod Carmichael

=== 2022 (Film) ===
Sources -

Category	Winner
Best Film	The Power of the Dog
Best LGBTQ Film	Flee
Best Non-English Language Film	Drive My Car
Best Unsung Film	Passing
Best Director	Jane Campion – The Power of the Dog
Best Screenplay (original or adapted)	Jane Campion – The Power of the Dog
Best Film Performance	Kristen Stewart – Spencer
Best Supporting Film Performance	Ariana DeBose – West Side Story
Best Documentary	Flee
Best LGBTQ Documentary	Flee
Most Visually Striking Film	Dune
Best Animated Film	Flee
Best Film Music	Tick, Tick... Boom!
"We're Wilde About You!" Rising Star	Ariana DeBose
Wilde Artist Award (to a truly groundbreaking force in film, theatre and/or television)	Pedro Almodóvar
Campiest Flick	House of Gucci
Timeless Star (to an actor or performer whose exemplary career is marked by character, wisdom and wit)	Rita Moreno
GALECA LGBTQIA+ Film Trailblazer (for creating art that inspires empathy, truth and equity)	Pedro Almodóvar

=== 2020-21 (Television) ===
Sources -

Category	Winner
TV Drama of the Year	Pose
TV Comedy of the Year	Hacks
Best TV Movie or Limited Series	I May Destroy You
Best LGBTQ TV Show	It's a Sin
Best Unsung Show	Love, Victor
Best TV Performance (TIE)	Michaela Coel, I May Destroy You (HBO); Jean Smart, Hacks
Best Supporting TV Performance	Kathryn Hahn, WandaVision
Best TV Musical Performance	Kathryn Hahn and singers, "Agatha All Along," WandaVision
Best TV Documentary or Documentary Series	Framing Britney Spears
Best Current Affairs Show	Ziwe
Best Animated Show	Big Mouth
Best Reality Show	RuPaul's Drag Race
Most Visually Striking Show	WandaVision
Campiest TV Show	Eurovision Song Contest
Wilde Wit of the Year (TIE) (honoring a performer, writer, or commentator whose observations both challenge and amuse)	Michaela Coel; Bowen Yang
GALECA Trailblazer Award (for creating art that inspires empathy, truth and equity)	Michaela Jaé Rodriguez

=== 2020 (Film) ===
Sources -

Category	Winner
Best Film	Nomadland
Best LGBTQ Film	Ma Rainey's Black Bottom
Best Non-English Language Film	Minari
Best Director	Chloé Zhao – Nomadland
Best Screenplay (original or adapted)	Emerald Fennell – Promising Young Woman
Best Unsung Film	The Forty-Year-Old Version
Best Documentary	Disclosure (tie); Welcome to Chechnya (tie)
Best LGBTQ Documentary	Disclosure (tie); Welcome to Chechnya (tie)
Best Film Performance - Actress	Carey Mulligan – Promising Young Woman
Best Film Performance - Actor	Chadwick Boseman – Ma Rainey's Black Bottom
Best Film Performance - Supporting Actress	Youn Yuh-jung – Minari
Best Film Performance - Supporting Actor	Daniel Kaluuya – Judas and the Black Messiah
Most Visually Striking Film	Nomadland
Campiest Flick	Eurovision Song Contest: The Story of Fire Saga
"We're Wilde About You!" Rising Star Award	Radha Blank
Wilde Artist Award (honoring a truly groundbreaking force in the fields of film, theater, and/or television)	Dolly Parton
GALECA Trailblazer Award	Isabel Sandoval
Timeless Star (to an actor or performer whose exemplary career is marked by character, wisdom, and wit)	Leslie Jordan

=== 2019–2020 (Television) ===
Sources -

Category	Winner
TV Drama of the Year	Killing Eve
TV Comedy of the Year	Schitt's Creek
Best TV Movie or Limited Series	Watchmen
Best LGBTQ TV Show	Schitt's Creek
Best TV Performance - Actress	Catherine O'Hara, Schitt's Creek
Best TV Performance - Actor	Hugh Jackman, Bad Education
Best Supporting TV Performance - Actress	Annie Murphy, Schitt's Creek
Best Supporting TV Performance - Actor	Dan Levy, Schitt's Creek
Best TV Musical Performance	Janelle Monáe and Billy Porter, Opening Number, 92nd Academy Awards
Best Current Affairs Program	Last Week Tonight with John Oliver
Best Unsung TV Show	What We Do in the Shadows
Most Visually Striking Show	Watchmen
Campiest TV Show	Tiger King: Murder, Mayhem and Madness
Wilde Wit of the Year (honoring a performer, writer, or commentator whose observations both challenge and amuse)	Dan Levy

=== 2019 ===
Sources -

Category	Winner
Film of the Year	Parasite
Director of the Year	Bong Joon-ho – Parasite
Film Performance of the Year – Actor	Antonio Banderas – Pain and Glory
Film Performance of the Year – Actress	Renée Zellweger – Judy
Film Performance of the Year – Supporting Actor	Song Kang-ho – Parasite
Film Performance of the Year – Supporting Actress	Jennifer Lopez – Hustlers
LGBTQ Film of the Year	Portrait of a Lady on Fire
Foreign Language Film of the Year	Parasite
Screenplay of the Year (original or adapted)	Bong Joon-ho and Han Jin-won – Parasite
Documentary of the Year	Honeyland
LGBTQ Documentary of the Year	Scream, Queen! My Nightmare on Elm Street
Visually Striking Film of the Year (honoring a production of stunning beauty, from art direction to cinematography)	Portrait of a Lady on Fire (tie); 1917 (tie)
Unsung Film of the Year	Booksmart
Campy Film of the Year	Cats
TV Drama of the Year	Pose
TV Comedy of the Year	Fleabag
TV Performance of the Year – Actor	Billy Porter – Pose
TV Performance of the Year – Actress	Phoebe Waller-Bridge – Fleabag
Current Affairs Show of the Year	Leaving Neverland
TV Musical Performance of the Year	Bradley Cooper and Lady Gaga, "Shallow," The 91st Academy Awards
LGBTQ Show of the Year	Pose
Unsung TV Show of the Year	The Other Two
Campy TV Show of the Year	The Politician
We're Wilde About You / Rising Star of the Year	Florence Pugh
Wilde Wit of the Year (honoring a performer, writer, or commentator whose observations both challenge and amuse)	Phoebe Waller-Bridge
Wilde Artist of the Decade (honoring a truly groundbreaking force in the fields of film, theater, and/or television)	Lady Gaga
Timeless Star (to an actor or performer whose exemplary career is marked by character, wisdom, and wit)	Catherine O'Hara

=== 2018 ===
Sources -

Category	Winner
Film of the Year	The Favourite
Director of the Year	Alfonso Cuarón – Roma
Film Performance of the Year – Actor	Ethan Hawke – First Reformed
Film Performance of the Year – Actress	Olivia Colman – The Favourite
Film Performance of the Year – Supporting Actor	Richard E. Grant – Can You Ever Forgive Me?
Film Performance of the Year – Supporting Actress	Regina King – If Beale Street Could Talk
LGBTQ Film of the Year	Can You Ever Forgive Me?
Foreign Language Film of the Year	Roma
Screenplay of the Year (original or adapted)	Deborah Davis and Tony McNamara – The Favourite
Documentary of the Year	Won't You Be My Neighbor?
LGBTQ Documentary of the Year	McQueen
Visually Striking Film of the Year (honoring a production of stunning beauty, from art direction to cinematography)	Annihilation
Unsung Film of the Year	Widows
Campy Film of the Year	A Simple Favor
TV Drama of the Year	Pose
TV Comedy of the Year	Schitt's Creek
TV Performance of the Year – Actor	Billy Porter, Pose
TV Performance of the Year – Actress	Sandra Oh – Killing Eve
Current Affairs Show of the Year	Full Frontal with Samantha Bee
TV Musical Performance of the Year	Billy Porter, Michaela Jaé Rodriguez and Our Lady J, "Home," Pose
LGBTQ Show of the Year	Pose
Unsung TV Show of the Year	Schitt's Creek
Campy TV Show of the Year	RuPaul's Drag Race
We're Wilde About You / Rising Star of the Year	Awkwafina
Wilde Wit of the Year (honoring a performer, writer, or commentator whose observations both challenge and amuse)	Hannah Gadsby
Wilde Artist of the Year (honoring a truly groundbreaking force in the fields of film, theater, and/or television)	Ryan Murphy
Timeless Star (to an actor or performer whose exemplary career is marked by character, wisdom, and wit)	Harvey Fierstein

=== 2017 ===
Category	Winner
Film of the Year	Call Me by Your Name
Director of the Year	Greta Gerwig – Lady Bird
Film Performance of the Year – Actor	Timothée Chalamet – Call Me by Your Name
Film Performance of the Year – Actress	Sally Hawkins – The Shape of Water
Film Performance of the Year – Supporting Actor	William Dafoe – The Florida Project
Film Performance of the Year – Supporting Actress	Laurie Metcalf – Lady Bird
LGBTQ Film of the Year	Call Me by Your Name
Foreign Language Film of the Year	BPM (Beats per Minute)
Screenplay of the Year (original or adapted)	Jordan Peele – Get Out
Documentary of the Year	Faces Places
Visually Striking Film of the Year (honoring a production of stunning beauty, from art direction to cinematography)	The Shape of Water
Unsung Film of the Year	God's Own Country
Campy Film of the Year	Mother!
TV Drama of the Year	Big Little Lies
TV Comedy of the Year	The Marvelous Mrs. Maisel
TV Performance of the Year – Actor	Kyle MacLachlan – Twin Peaks
TV Performance of the Year – Actress	Nicole Kidman – Big Little Lies
Current Affairs Show of the Year	Full Frontal with Samantha Bee
TV Musical Performance of the Year	Kate McKinnon, "(Kellyanne) Conway!" – Saturday Night Live
LGBTQ Show of the Year	RuPaul's Drag Race
Unsung TV Show of the Year	American Gods
Campy TV Show of the Year	Feud: Bette and Joan
We're Wilde About You / Rising Star of the Year	Timothée Chalamet
Wilde Wit of the Year (TIE) (honoring a performer, writer, or commentator whose observations both challenge and amuse)	Kate McKinnon; Jordan Peele
Wilde Artist of the Year (honoring a truly groundbreaking force in the fields of film, theater, and/or television)	Jordan Peele
Timeless Star (to an actor or performer whose exemplary career is marked by character, wisdom, and wit)	Meryl Streep

=== 2016 ===
Category	Winner
Film of the Year	Moonlight
Director of the Year	Barry Jenkins – Moonlight
Film Performance of the Year – Actor	Mahershala Ali – Moonlight
Film Performance of the Year – Actress	Viola Davis – Fences
LGBTQ Film of the Year	Moonlight
Foreign Language Film of the Year	The Handmaiden
Screenplay of the Year (original or adapted)	Barry Jenkins – Moonlight
Documentary of the Year	O.J.: Made in America
Visually Striking Film of the Year (honoring a production of stunning beauty, from art direction to cinematography)	La La Land
Unsung Film of the Year	Christine
Campy Film of the Year	The Dressmaker
TV Drama of the Year	The People v. O. J. Simpson: American Crime Story
TV Comedy of the Year	Transparent
TV Performance of the Year – Actor	Jeffrey Tambor – Transparent
TV Performance of the Year – Actress	Sarah Paulson – The People v. O. J. Simpson: American Crime Story
Current Affairs Show of the Year	Full Frontal with Samantha Bee
TV Musical Performance of the Year	Kate McKinnon, "Hallelujah," Saturday Night Live
LGBTQ Show of the Year	Transparent
Unsung TV Show of the Year	The Real O'Neals
Campy TV Show of the Year	RuPaul's Drag Race: All Stars
We're Wilde About You / Rising Star of the Year	Trevante Rhodes
Wilde Wit of the Year (honoring a performer, writer, or commentator whose observations both challenge and amuse)	Carrie Fisher
Wilde Artist of the Year (TIE) (honoring a truly groundbreaking force in the fields of film, theater, and/or television)	Kate McKinnon; Lin-Manuel Miranda
Timeless Star (to an actor or performer whose exemplary career is marked by character, wisdom, and wit)	John Waters

=== 2015 ===
Category	Winner
Film of the Year	Carol
Film Director of the Year	Todd Haynes – Carol
Film Performance of the Year – Actor	Leonardo DiCaprio – The Revenant
Film Performance of the Year – Actress	Cate Blanchett – Carol
LGBTQ Film of the Year	Carol
Foreign Language Film of the Year	Son of Saul
Screenplay of the Year (original or adapted)	Phyllis Nagy – Carol
Documentary of the Year	Amy
Visually Striking Film of the Year (honoring a production of stunning beauty, from art direction to cinematography)	Mad Max: Fury Road
Unsung Film of the Year	Tangerine
Campy Flick of the Year	Magic Mike XXL
TV Drama of the Year (TIE)	Fargo; Orange Is the New Black
TV Comedy of the Year	Transparent
TV Performance of the Year – Actor	Jeffrey Tambor – Transparent
TV Performance of the Year – Actress	Taraji P. Henson – Empire
Current Affairs Show of the Year	Last Week Tonight with John Oliver
LGBTQ Show of the Year	Transparent
Unsung TV Show of the Year	Looking
TV Musical Moment of the Year	Aretha Franklin, "(You Make Me Feel Like) A Natural Woman," 38th Annual Kennedy Center Honors
Campy TV Show of the Year	Empire
We're Wilde About You / Rising Star Award	Alicia Vikander
Wilde Wit of the Year (honoring a performer, writer, or commentator whose observations both challenge and amuse)	Amy Schumer
Wilde Artist of the Year (honoring a truly groundbreaking force in the fields of film, theater, and/or television)	Todd Haynes
Timeless Star (to an actor or performer whose exemplary career is marked by character, wisdom, and wit)	Jane Fonda

=== 2014 ===
George Takei, LGBTQ rights activist and co-star of Star Trek, thanked GALECA in a YouTube video for naming him their 2014 choice for Timeless Star.

Category	Winner
Film of the Year	Boyhood
Film Director of the Year	Ava DuVernay – Selma
Film Performance of the Year – Actor	Eddie Redmayne – The Theory of Everything
Film Performance of the Year – Actress	Julianne Moore – Still Alice
LGBTQ Film of the Year	Pride
Foreign Language Film of the Year	Mommy
Documentary of the Year	The Case Against 8
Visually Striking Film of the Year (honoring a production of stunning beauty, from art direction to cinematography)	The Grand Budapest Hotel
Unsung Film of the Year	Pride
Campy Flick of the Year	Into the Woods
TV Drama of the Year	The Normal Heart
TV Comedy of the Year	Transparent
TV Performance of the Year – Actress	Lisa Kudrow – The Comeback
TV Performance of the Year – Actor	Jeffrey Tambor – Transparent
TV Director of the Year	Joey Soloway – Transparent
LGBTQ TV Show of the Year	Transparent
Current Affairs Show of the Year	The Daily Show with Jon Stewart
Unsung TV Show of the Year	Getting On
Campy TV Show of the Year	Jane the Virgin
TV Musical Performance of the Year	Neil Patrick Harris, "Sugar Daddy" from Hedwig and the Angry Inch, 68th Annual Tony Awards
Video of the Year	"Chandelier" – Sia
We're Wilde About You / Rising Star Award	Gina Rodriguez
Wilde Wit of the Year (honoring a performer, writer, or commentator whose observations both challenge and amuse)	John Oliver
Wilde Artist of the Year (honoring a truly groundbreaking force in the fields of film, theater, and/or television)	Joey Soloway
Timeless Award (honoring an actor or performer whose exemplary career has been marked by character, wisdom, and wit)	George Takei

=== 2013 ===
In 2013, Sir Ian McKellen expressed gratitude to members for honoring him with their 2012 Timeless Star career achievement honor, writing in a note to the group, "I shall try to live up to Galeca's approval." James Franco, recipient of GALECA's special Wilde Artist of the Year award in 2013, thanked the group by posting a mini art piece noting his honor on Instagram.

Category	Winner
Film of the Year	12 Years a Slave
Film Performance of the Year – Actor	Matthew McConaughey – Dallas Buyers Club
Film Performance of the Year – Actress	Cate Blanchett – Blue Jasmine
LGBT Film of the Year	Blue Is the Warmest Colour
Foreign Language Film of the Year	Blue Is the Warmest Colour
Documentary of the Year	Bridegroom
Visually Striking Film of the Year (honoring a production of stunning beauty, from art direction to cinematography)	Gravity
Campy Flick of the Year	I'm So Excited
Unsung Film of the Year (TIE)	Kill Your Darlings; Short Term 12
TV Drama of the Year (TIE)	Behind the Candelabra; Orange Is the New Black
TV Comedy of the Year	Girls
TV Performance of the Year – Actor	Michael Douglas – Behind the Candelabra
TV Performance of the Year – Actress	Jessica Lange – American Horror Story: Coven
TV Musical Performance of the Year	Shirley Bassey, "Goldfinger," 85th Academy Awards
LGBT TV Show of the Year	Orange Is the New Black
Campy TV Show of the Year	American Horror Story: Coven
Unsung TV Show of the Year	Getting On
We're Wilde About You / Rising Star Award	Laverne Cox
Wilde Wit of the Year (honoring a performer, writer, or commentator whose observations both challenge and amuse)	Rachel Maddow
Wilde Artist of the Year (honoring a truly groundbreaking force in the fields of film, theater, and/or television)	James Franco
Timeless Award (honoring an actor or performer whose exemplary career has been marked by character, wisdom, and wit)	Lily Tomlin

=== 2012 ===
Sources -

Category	Winner
Film of the Year	Argo
Film Performance of the Year – Actor	Daniel Day-Lewis – Lincoln
Film Performance of the Year – Actress	Anne Hathaway – Les Misérables
LGBT Film of the Year	Keep the Lights On
Documentary of the Year	How to Survive a Plague
Visually Striking Film of the Year (honoring a production of stunning beauty, from art direction to cinematography)	Life of Pi
Campy Flick of the Year (TIE)	Magic Mike; The Paperboy
Unsung Film of the Year	Bernie
TV Drama of the Year (TIE)	American Horror Story: Asylum; Homeland
TV Comedy of the Year	Girls
TV Performance of the Year – Actor	Damian Lewis – Homeland
TV Performance of the Year – Actress	Jessica Lange – American Horror Story: Asylum
TV Musical Performance of the Year	Jennifer Hudson, Tribute to Whitney Houston, 54th Annual Grammy Awards
LGBT TV Show of the Year (TIE)	Modern Family (ABC); The New Normal
Campy TV Show of the Year	Liz & Dick
Unsung TV Show of the Year	Happy Endings
TV or Movie Title of the Year	Don't Trust the B— in Apartment 23
We're Wilde About You / Rising Star Award	Ezra Miller
Wilde Wit of the Year (honoring a performer, writer, or commentator whose observations both challenge and amuse)	Jon Stewart
Wilde Artist of the Year (honoring a truly groundbreaking force in the fields of film, theater, and/or television)	Ryan Murphy
Timeless Award (honoring an actor or performer whose exemplary career has been marked by character, wisdom, and wit)	Sir Ian McKellen

=== 2011 ===
Sources -

Category	Winner
Film of the Year	Weekend
Film Performance of the Year	Meryl Streep – The Iron Lady
LGBT-Themed Film of the Year	Weekend
Documentary of the Year	We Were Here
LGBT-Themed Documentary of the Year	We Were Here
Unsung Film of the Year	50/50
Campy Flick of the Year	The Muppets
TV Drama of the Year	American Horror Story
TV Comedy of the Year	Modern Family
TV Musical Program of the Year (TIE)	Glee; Lady Gaga Presents the Monster Ball Tour
TV Performance of the Year	Jessica Lange – American Horror Story
LGBT-Themed TV Show of the Year	Modern Family
Campy TV Show of the Year	Revenge
Unsung TV Show of the Year	Suburgatory
The We're Wilde About You Rising Star Award	Michael Fassbender
Wilde Wit of the Year Award	Kathy Griffin
Timeless Award	Betty White

=== 2010 ===
Sources -

Category	Winner
Film of the Year	I Am Love
Film Performance of the Year	Annette Bening – The Kids Are All Right
LGBT-Themed Film of the Year	I Love You Phillip Morris
Documentary of the Year	Joan Rivers: A Piece of Work
LGBT-Themed Documentary of the Year	8: The Mormon Proposition
Unsung Film of the Year	Easy A
Campy Flick of the Year	Burlesque
TV Drama of the Year	The Good Wife (CBS)
TV Musical or Comedy of the Year	Glee
TV Drama Performance of the Year	Michael C. Hall – Dexter
TV Comedy Performance of the Year (TIE)	Chris Colfer – Glee; Jane Lynch – Glee
LGBT-Themed TV Show of the Year	Glee
Unsung TV Show of the Year	Hung
Campy TV Show of the Year	Hot in Cleveland
We're Wilde About You / Rising Star Award	Darren Criss
Wilde Wit of the Year (honoring a performer, writer, or commentator whose observations both challenge and amuse)	Rachel Maddow
Timeless Award (honoring an actor or performer whose exemplary career has been marked by character, wisdom, and wit)	Dame Angela Lansbury

=== 2009 ===
Sources -

Category	Winner
Film of the Year	A Single Man
Film Performance of the Year	Colin Firth – A Single Man
LGBT-Themed Film of the Year	A Single Man
Campy Flick of the Year	Obsessed
TV Drama of the Year	Grey Gardens
TV Musical or Comedy of the Year	Glee
TV Performance of the Year: Drama	Drew Barrymore – Grey Gardens
TV Comedy Performance of the Year: Musical or Comedy	Jane Lynch – Glee
LGBT-Themed TV Show of the Year	Prayers for Bobby
Campy TV Show of the Year	Glee
We're Wilde About You / Rising Star Award	Gabourey Sidibe
Wilde Wit of the Year (honoring a performer, writer, or commentator whose observations both challenge and amuse)	Rachel Maddow
Timeless Award (honoring an actor or performer whose exemplary career has been marked by character, wisdom, and wit)	Cloris Leachman

== Dorian Theater Awards ==
The Dorian Awards honor both Broadway and Off-Broadway theatre in the following categories:

- Outstanding Broadway Musical
- Outstanding Broadway Play
- Outstanding Broadway Musical Revival
- Outstanding Broadway Play Revival
- Outstanding LGBTQ Broadway Production
- Outstanding Lead Performance in a Broadway Musical
- Outstanding Lead Performance in a Broadway Play
- Outstanding Featured Performance in a Broadway Musical
- Outstanding Featured Performance in a Broadway Play
- Outstanding Broadway Ensemble
- The Broadway Showstopper Award
- Outstanding Off-Broadway Production
- Outstanding Off-Broadway Revival
- Outstanding LGBTQ Off-Broadway Production
- Outstanding Lead Performance in an Off-Broadway Production
- Outstanding Featured Performance in an Off-Broadway Production
- Outstanding Design of a Broadway Production
- Outstanding Design for an Off-Broadway Production
- Outstanding Script of a Broadway Play
- Outstanding Original Score of a Broadway Production
- Outstanding Book of a Broadway Musical
- LGBTQ Theater Artist of the Season
- LGBTQ+ Theater Trailblazer

=== 2026 ===
Category	Winner
Outstanding Broadway Musical	Schmigadoon!
Outstanding Broadway Play (TIE)	The Balusters and Giant
Outstanding Broadway Musical Revival	Ragtime
Outstanding Broadway Play Revival	Death of a Salesman
Outstanding LGBTQ Broadway Production	The Rocky Horror Show
Outstanding Lead Performance in a Broadway Musical	Joshua Henry, Ragtime
Outstanding Lead Performance in a Broadway Play	John Lithgow, Giant
Outstanding Featured Performance in a Broadway Musical	Layton Williams, Titanique
Outstanding Featured Performance in a Broadway Play	Alden Ehrenreich, Becky Shaw
Outstanding Broadway Ensemble	Ragtime
Outstanding Original Score of a Broadway Production	The Rescues, The Lost Boys
Outstanding Book of a Broadway Musical	Cinco Paul, Schmigadoon!
Outstanding Script of a Broadway Play	David Lindsay-Abaire, The Balusters
Outstanding Design of a Broadway Production	The Lost Boys
Broadway Showstopper Award to a standout production number or scene	Cats: The Jellicle Ball, "Skimbleshanks the Railway Cat," performed by Emma Sofia
Outstanding Off-Broadway Musical	Mexodus
Outstanding Off-Broadway Play	Prince Faggot
Outstanding Off-Broadway Revival (TIE)	Heathers and The 25th Annual Putnam County Spelling Bee
Outstanding LGBTQ Off-Broadway Production	Prince Faggot
Outstanding Lead Performance in an Off-Broadway Production (TIE)	Quincy Tyler Bernstine, Well, I'll Let You Go and John McCrea, Prince Faggot
Outstanding Featured Performance in an Off-Broadway Production (TIE)	J. Harrison Ghee, Saturday Church and David Greenspan, Prince Faggot
Outstanding Writing for an Off-Broadway Production	Jordan Tannahill, Prince Faggot
Outstanding Design for an Off-Broadway Production	Masquerade
LGBTQ Theater Artist of the Season	Qween Jean
LGBTQ Theater Trailblazer For a lifelong commitment to creating art that inspires empathy, truth and equity	Junior LaBeija

=== 2025 ===
Category	Winner
Outstanding Broadway Musical	Maybe Happy Ending
Outstanding Broadway Play	John Proctor is the Villain
Outstanding Broadway Musical Revival	Sunset Blvd.
Outstanding Broadway Play Revival	Eureka Day
Outstanding LGBTQ Broadway Production	Death Becomes Her
Outstanding Lead Performance in a Broadway Musical	Audra Mcdonald, Gypsy
Outstanding Lead Performance in a Broadway Play	Sarah Snook, The Picture of Dorian Gray
Outstanding Featured Performance in a Broadway Musical	Jak Malone, Operation Mincemeat
Outstanding Featured Performance in a Broadway Play	Fina Strazza, John Proctor is the Villain
Outstanding Broadway Ensemble	John Proctor is the Villain
The Broadway Showstopper Award (TIE) to a standout production number or scene	Gypsy - "Rose's Turn," performed by Audra McDonald Sunset Blvd. - "Sunset Boulevard," performed by Tom Francis
Outstanding Off-Broadway Production	Cats: The Jellicle Ball
Outstanding LGBTQ Off-Broadway Production	Cats: The Jellicle Ball
Outstanding Lead Performance in an Off-Broadway Production	Andrew Scott, Vanya
Outstanding Featured Performance in an Off-Broadway Production	André De Shields, Cats: The Jellicle Ball
LGBTQ Theater Artist of the Season (TIE)	Jonathan Groff Branden Jacobs-Jenkins
LGBTQ+ Theater Trailblazer For a lifelong commitment to creating art that inspires empathy, truth and equity	André De Shields

=== 2024 ===
Category	Winner
Outstanding Broadway Musical	Illinoise
Outstanding Broadway Play	Stereophonic
Outstanding Broadway Musical Revival	Merrily We Roll Along
Outstanding Broadway Play Revival	Appropriate
Outstanding Lead Performance in a Broadway Musical	Jonathan Groff - Merrily We Roll Along
Outstanding Featured Performance in a Broadway Musical	Daniel Radcliffe - Merrily We Roll Along
Outstanding Lead Performance in a Broadway Play	Sarah Paulson - Appropriate
Outstanding Featured Performance in a Broadway Play (TIE)	Sarah Pidgeon - Stereophonic Kara Young - Purlie Victorious
Outstanding Broadway Ensemble	Stereophonic
The Broadway Showstopper Award (to a standout production number or scene)	"Franklin Shepard INC.": Merrily We Roll Along
Outstanding LGBTQ Broadway Production	Illinoise
Outstanding Off-Broadway Production	Oh, Mary!
Outstanding LGBTQ Off-Broadway Production	Oh, Mary!
Outstanding Lead Performance in an Off-Broadway Production	Cole Escola - Oh, Mary!
Outstanding Featured Performance in an Off-Broadway Production	Conrad Ricamora - Oh, Mary!
LGBTQ Theater Artist of the Season	Cole Escola
LGBTQ Theater Trailblazer Award (For a lifelong commitment to creating art that inspires empathy, truth and equity)	Paula Vogel

=== 2023 ===
Sources -

Category	Winner
Outstanding Broadway Musical	Kimberly Akimbo
Outstanding Broadway Play	Fat Ham
Outstanding Broadway Musical Revival	Into the Woods
Outstanding Broadway Play Revival	A Doll's House
Outstanding Lead Performance in a Broadway Musical	Victoria Clark - Kimberly Akimbo
Outstanding Featured Performance in a Broadway Musical	Bonnie Milligan - Kimberly Akimbo
Outstanding Lead Performance in a Broadway Play	Jodie Comer – Prima Facie
Outstanding Featured Performance in a Broadway Play	Crystal Lucas-Perry – Ain't No Mo'
Outstanding Broadway Ensemble	Kimberly Akimbo
The Broadway Showstopper Award (to a standout production number or scene)	"Independently Owned" – Shucked
Outstanding LGBTQ Broadway Production	Fat Ham
Outstanding Off-Broadway Production	Titanique
Outstanding Off-Broadway Performance	Marla Mindelle – Titanique
LGBTQ Theater Trailblazer Award (to a figure who inspires empathy, truth, and equity)	J. Harrison Ghee
