= Dorian Award for LGBTQ Film of the Year =

- Awarded for: Best LGBTQ Film of the Year
- Country: United States
- Presented by: Gay and Lesbian Entertainment Critics Association (GALECA)
- First award: 2009
- Currently held by: I Saw The TV Glow (2024)
- Website: galeca.org

LGBTQ Film of the Year is one of the main categories of Dorian Awards, and it has been given annually since 2009.

== History ==
It was called LGBT-Themed Film of the Year from 2009 to 2011, and LGBT Film of the Year in 2012 and 2013. For the group's 2021 and 2022 awards, the category was temporarily named Best Film, mirroring the revised timelines of other film honors affected by the COVID-19 pandemic.

== Winners and nominees ==
Year	Film	Director	Ref
2010
2010	A Single Man	Tom Ford	
2010	Outrage	Kirby Dick	
2010	Precious	Lee Daniels	
2011
2011	I Love You Phillip Morris	Glenn Ficarra, John Requa	
2011	Howl	Rob Epstein, Jeffrey Friedman	
2011	The Kids Are All Right	Lisa Cholodenko	
2011	A Marine Story	Ned Farr	
2011	La Mission	Peter Bratt	
2011	Undertow (Contracorriente)	Javier Fuentes-León	
2012
2012	Weekend	Andrew Haigh	
2012	Albert Nobbs	Rodrigo García	
2012	Beginners	Mike Mills	
2012	Pariah	Dee Rees	
2012	Tomboy	Céline Sciamma	
2013
2013	Keep the Lights On	Ira Sachs	
2013	Any Day Now	Travis Fine	
2013	Cloud Atlas	Tom Tykwer, Lana Wachowski, Lilly Wachowski	
2013	Gayby	Jonathan Lisecki	
2013	The Perks of Being a Wallflower	Stephen Chbosky	
2014
2014	Blue Is the Warmest Colour	Abdellatif Kechiche	
2014	Dallas Buyers Club	Jean-Marc Vallée	
2014	Kill Your Darlings	John Krokidas	
2014	Laurence Anyways	Xavier Dolan	
2014	Philomena	Stephen Frears	
2015
2015	Pride	Matthew Warchus	
2015	The Imitation Game	Morten Tyldum	
2015	Love Is Strange	Ira Sachs	
2015	Stranger by the Lake (L'Inconnu du lac)	Alain Guiraudie	
2015	The Way He Looks (Hoje Eu Quero Voltar Sozinho)	Daniel Ribeiro	
2016
2016	Carol	Todd Haynes	
2016	The Danish Girl	Tom Hooper	
2016	Freeheld	Peter Sollett	
2016	Grandma	Paul Weitz	
2016	Tangerine	Sean Baker	
2017
2017	Moonlight	Barry Jenkins	
2017	Being 17 (Quand on a 17 ans)	André Téchiné	
2017	Closet Monster	Stephen Dunn	
2017	The Handmaiden (Agassi)	Park Chan-wook	
2017	Other People	Chris Kelly	
2018
2018	Call Me by Your Name	Luca Guadagnino	
2018	Battle of the Sexes	Valerie Faris, Jonathan Dayton	
2018	BPM (Beats per Minute)	Robin Campillo	
2018	A Fantastic Woman (Una mujer fantástica)	Sebastián Lelio	
2018	God's Own Country	Francis Lee	
2019
2019	Can You Ever Forgive Me?	Marielle Heller	
2019	Boy Erased	Joel Edgerton	
2019	Disobedience	Sebastián Lelio	
2019	The Favourite	Yorgos Lanthimos	
2019	Love, Simon	Greg Berlanti	
2020
2020	Portrait of a Lady on Fire	Celine Sciamma	
2020	Booksmart	Olivia Wilde	
2020	End of the Century (Fin de siglo)	Lucio Castro	
2020	Pain and Glory (Dolor y gloria)	Pedro Almodóvar	
2020	Rocketman	Dexter Fletcher	
2021
2021	Ma Rainey's Black Bottom	George C. Wolfe	
2021	Ammonite	Francis Lee	
2021	The Boys in the Band	Joe Mantello	
2021	I Carry You with Me (Te Llevo Conmigo)	Heidi Ewing	
2021	Supernova	Harry Macqueen	
2021	Uncle Frank	Alan Ball	
2022
2022	Flee	Jonas Poher Rasmussen	
2022	Benedetta	Paul Verhoeven	
2022	Parallel Mothers (Madres paralelas)	Pedro Almodóvar	
2022	The Power of the Dog	Jane Campion	
2022	Shiva Baby	Emma Seligman	
2023
2023	Everything Everywhere All at Once	Daniel Kwan, Daniel Scheinert	
2023	Benediction	Terence Davies	
2023	Bros	Nicholas Stoller	
2023	The Inspection	Elegance Bratton	
2023	Tár	Todd Field	
2024
2024	All of Us Strangers	Andrew Haigh	
2024	Bottoms	Emma Seligman	
2024	Passages	Ira Sachs	
2024	Rustin	George C. Wolfe	
2024	Saltburn	Emerald Fennell	
2025
2025	I Saw the TV Glow	Jane Schoenbrun	
2025	Challengers	Luca Guadagnino	
2025	Emilia Pérez	Jacques Audiard	
2025	Love Lies Bleeding	Rose Glass	
2025	Queer	Luca Guadagnino	
2026
2026	Pillion	Harry Lighton	
2026	Blue Moon	Richard Linklater	
2026	Sorry, Baby	Eva Victor	
2026	Twinless	James Sweeney	
2026	Hedda	Nia DaCosta	

== See also ==
- Academy Award for Best Picture
