= The Cockettes =

Theater group

- Formation: 1969; 57 years ago
- Dissolved: 1972; 54 years ago
- Type: Theatre group
- Location: Haight-Ashbury, San Francisco, California, U.S.

The Cockettes were an avant-garde psychedelic hippie theater group founded by Hibiscus (George Edgerly Harris III) in the fall of 1969 when Hibiscus lived in Kaliflower. The troupe was formed out of a group of hippie artists, men and women, who were living in Haight-Ashbury, a neighborhood of San Francisco, California. Hibiscus came to live with them because of their preference for dressing outrageously and proposed the idea of putting their lifestyle on the stage. Later in the storefront at 992 Valencia Street, now Artists' Television Access.

Their brand of theater was influenced by The Living Theater, John Vaccaro's Play House of the Ridiculous, the films of Jack Smith, and the LSD ethos of Ken Kesey's Merry Pranksters. At first, they parodied American musicals, and sang show tunes, but moved to performing all original material, staging musicals, and musical comedies. They gained an underground cult following that led to mainstream exposure.

In 1971 a few members of the original group broke away from the Cockettes and formed their own theatre group, the Angels of Light. Noh Mercy (formerly On The Rag) and Tuxedomoon formed from the Angels of Light.

The Cockettes were the subject of an eponymous 2002 documentary film directed by David Weissman and Bill Weber.

== Underground beginnings ==
At the Pagoda Palace Theatre in San Francisco's North Beach neighborhood, impresario Sebastian (real name Milton Miron) let the Cockettes perform as part of his Nocturnal Dream Show, a showcase of underground films, in exchange for free admission. The posters for these performances were designed by Todd Trexler. The Futurama Costume Gala, a science-fiction themed New Year's Eve bash held by the Nocturnal Dream Show creators, drew a rowdy audience of around 600 people. The show soon became a "must-see" for San Francisco's hip community. Combining LSD-influenced dancing, set design, costumes and their own versions of show tunes (or original tunes in the same vein), the Cockettes took to the stage every month, performing prior to the Saturday midnight Nocturnal Dream Show. Show titles included Gone With the Showboat to Oklahoma, Tinsel Tarts In A Hot Coma, Journey to the Center of Uranus, Smacky & Our Gang, Hollywood Babylon and Pearls Over Shanghai.

Word of these shows quickly got out, and by September 1971, the Cockettes gained a reputation as pioneers of San Francisco's counterculture. After local press coverage and sightings of celebrities like fashion designer and socialite Gloria Vanderbilt and author Truman Capote, the Cockettes gained attention from culture and lifestyle publications such as Rolling Stone and Esquire and general interest magazines such as Look and Life.

In 1971, The Cockettes released the short film Tricia's Wedding, lampooning the wedding ceremony of Richard Nixon's daughter, Tricia Nixon; Nixon's chief of staff H. R. Haldeman arranged a secret screening of the film for White House staffers.

== Performance style ==
The Cockettes pioneered an eclectic style of dress and costume that had not been seen before. They drew inspiration from various sources such as silent film, Hollywood of the 1930s and 1940s, Broadway musicals and the art forms of surrealism and cubism. Using clothing and accessories from past eras found at flea markets and thrift shops, they incorporated these various disparate elements into a look that was unique and timeless, exploring their own personal fantasies by the use of the assemblage method, creating outfits that are now considered iconic within the Wearable Art movement. The Cockettes costumes were completed with the signature make up artistry, most famously the men having glitter in their beards and exaggerated eye make-up. On the stage their performances were initially ad hoc, unscripted and improvised, preferring an experimental and experiential approach to theatre where the outcome was unknown, reaching for a sense of Magic as a result. By their second year of performing on a monthly basis, scripts began to emerge, loosely based on certain themes with characters based on the personas of the individual players, including original songs and music. Their magnum opus was the three-act play Pearls Over Shanghai, with story and lyrics by Link Martin and music by Scrumbly Koldwyn.

== Philosophical split ==
During their first year the Cockettes were not paid for performances, although tickets to the shows sold for $2.00, the proceeds going to the theatre owner (during the first year the Cockettes sneaked many audience members into the theatre free through the back door). The reason for the lack of interest in payment was that the group, having come out of the Haight Ashbury hippie community, was not then focused on money. Later, when Cockette audiences began to include celebrities such as Truman Capote and members of European royal houses, the group insisted on payment. Even so, the amounts eventually paid were minimal.

== New York City trip ==
Once Hibiscus had left the group some of the members saw the departure as an opportunity to capitalize on the media attention from articles in Rolling Stone and Maureen Orth's pieces in the Village Voice as well as Rex Reed's nationally syndicated column. Whereas Hibiscus was dedicated to anarchy and breaking down boundaries others in the group saw the potential of the efforts and they even hired a theatre director. Hibiscus was explicitly political and committed to free performances as a part of the hippie ethos. At the same time Sylvester was being noted as a stand out act for his singing. He was getting funding from Gregg Gobel, the son of George Gobel, and had started to grow into an accomplished singer, even hiring The Pointer Sisters as his back-up singers. With Hibiscus, the de facto leader of the group, now gone, plans for a New York City show that could catapult the group to even greater fame were set into motion and tied to a double bill of the Cockettes and Sylvester's new band. Although rock-promoter Bill Graham passed on the opportunity for a New York show he did connect the group with Harry Zerler, "a wealthy talent scout for Columbia Records", and booked Sylvester as the opening act.

Under the watchful eye of a New York City Public Relations Director and Record Promotion man Billy Smith (Amato) who recognize the group as a potential entertainment group from San Francisco. News of the 47 Cockettes boarding the flight was covered by local television and the group took over the plane in full drag. Once in New York they were housed in a dingy hotel where heroin was easily scored, and spent most of their time as celebrated guests at dozens of parties where they could eat and drink for free, running a tab at a local diner and getting free taxicab rides. Sylvester knew the Cockettes were not going to do well, but he was determined to make his debut as a rock star and practiced with his band every day. The Cockettes were still transitioning from being "a happening" to actually doing structured performances. The group had one week to prepare, but they had few resources and little energy after all the parties. They were however the talk of town and their show was the hot ticket.

After Sebastian copyrighted the name the Cockettes, Hibiscus formed the Angels of Light. In November 1971, the Cockettes who had not left to become the Angels of Light were booked for performances at the Anderson Theater in New York City. The venue had no sound or lighting systems and needed a curtain. The stage was also twice the size of the Cockettes' usual one, so all the sets had to be rebuilt from scratch in six days. They opened with "Tinsel Tarts In a Hot Coma", a send-up of films about Broadway in the 1930s. According to accounts of the time, "Everybody who was anybody" came to the Cockettes' New York opening, including such celebrities as John Lennon and Yoko Ono, Liza Minnelli, Allen Ginsberg, Anthony Perkins, Truman Capote, Gore Vidal, and Angela Lansbury. Also attending were Andy Warhol and his own infamous gender-bending drag performers Holly Woodlawn and Candy Darling. But with the Cockettes' loose San Francisco magic, the opening night was a disaster, as New Yorkers expected a tightly performed show. Angela Lansbury walked out on the show, soon followed by Andy Warhol and most of the rest of the audience. After the show Gore Vidal quipped, "Having no talent is not enough."

The Cockettes had difficulty translating their San Francisco work to New York City, compounded by the fact that the Cockettes were rather anti-rehearsal. Their idea was to have a blast onstage with the true spirit of Hollywood. For San Francisco, the Cockettes in the late 1960s were beautiful, funny, liberating, psychedelic messengers from the gods. But the New York celebrities the Cockettes wanted to impress were not impressed. Later, the Cockettes explained their New York failure by commenting "the New York audiences did not understand us." After a week of Tinsel Tarts... playing to empty houses, they performed their original musical Pearls Over Shanghai for the remaining 2 weeks of their contract, and the Village Voice gave it a rave. Sylvester and his band had more consistently positive reviews, but he disassociated himself after several nights on advice from his business friends.

== Notable members ==
After the New York run at the Anderson Theater, the Cockettes returned to San Francisco and performed Les Etoile Du Minuit, the final version of Pearls Over Shanghai, Journey to the Center of Uranus and their final show, Hot Greeks. Divine, star of films by noted filmmaker John Waters, joined the group in Journey to the Center of Uranus, thus making her San Francisco debut. In that show Divine performed the Cockettes' song "A Crab On Your Anus Means You're Loved" while dressed as a big, red lobster.

In 1970 Tomata duPlenty, inspired by early Cockette shows, went on to create a spin-off group in Seattle, Washington called Ze Whiz Kidz. He also created the seminal L.A. electropunk band, the Screamers, and he was the lead singer. Du Plenty went on to play a Cockettes-inspired lead role in the punk rock musical Population: 1.

After the group disbanded in the spring of 1972, various Cockettes continued to perform, either as solo performers or as a group that was no longer billed as The Cockettes. John Rothermel, who was often cast in a lead role due to his excellent singing voice and knowledge of 1920s/1930s music, had a successful cabaret career in San Francisco. In the fall of 1972 Fayette Hauser, Tomata du Plenty, Link Martin, John Flowers, and Sweet Pam moved to New York City to perform in underground theatre. They lived on the Bowery and performed at the Cafe Cino, The Bouwerie Lane Theatre in the Palm Casino Revue, Club 82 and CBGB's with other groups such as the Ramones and Blondie. Later a few Cockettes formed the group Paula Pucker and the Pioneers.

In 1975 Tomata du Plenty and Fayette Hauser moved to Los Angeles and continued to perform in small theatre venues like the Anti-Club and Al's bar. Fayette became the lead singer in the L.A.-based New Age band Interpol with Jeff McGregor and Chuck Ivey.

Sylvester's solo renditions of standard torch songs by artists including Etta James, Shirley Bassey, Bessie Smith, Ethel Waters, Billie Holiday, Dinah Washington, and Lena Horne, led to him becoming one of the most prolific singers of the disco era.

Bobby Cameron, who met Alejandro Jodorowsky during the tour in NYC and was offered a role along with costume designer Nicky Nichols in his film The Holy Mountain (1973), started a career as a showgirl and actress in TV series and B movies under the mononym Cameron.

Other core members of the Cockettes were Link (aka Link Martin, aka Luther Cupp), Gary Cherry, Rumi Missabu, John Rothermel, Tahara (whose parents had been rodeo clowns), Goldie Glitters, "Johnny Cockette", Sweet Pam (aka Pam Tent), Martin Worman, Scrumbly Koldewyn (who wrote tunes to Link's Martin's lyrics), Fayette Hauser, Daniel Ware, Dusty Dawn, Linden, Brent Jensen, Pristine Condition (aka Keith Blanton), Reggie (aka Anton Dunigan), and Miss Harlow (who had been an original Plaster Caster). Kreemah Ritz (originally known as Big Daryl) and Chris Kilo who produced a few of the early shows after the Angels/Cockette split. Many other people, too numerous to mention, performed in only one or two shows.

== Legacy ==
Numerous performers and performing groups spun off from the Cockettes, including the Seattle Ze Whiz Kidz (including actors Tomato Du Plenty and Screaming Orchids; the first Whiz Kidz show was a musical based on the life of Yma Súmac), The San Francisco Angels of Light, The New York Angels of Light, the Assorted Nuts, among others. Many Cockettes also continue to perform in the theatre world today.

A 2009 revival of Pearls Over Shanghai (the libretto was originally written by Link Martin) in San Francisco included the participation of Rumi Missabu and piano accompaniment by composer Scrumbly Koldewyn, with Tahara one of the costume collaborators.

On December 3, 2009, several members of the Cockettes (Fayette Hauser, Scrumbly Koldewyn, Rumi Missabu, Sweet Pam, Tahara) came together at SFMOMA for a rare screening of the films Tricia's Wedding, Palace, and Elevator Girls in Bondage followed by discussions and memorable Cockettes moments. There was an afterparty at the Cafe du Nord on Market Street near Noe Street at which the Cockettes-inspired New York drag troupe the Dixie Chicks performed.

The Cockettes: Acid Drag & Sexual Anarchy, an exhibition exploring the powerful impact the Cockettes had on the San Francisco gay community and on gay culture further afield, is set to open in March, 2022, at San Francisco Public Library. The exhibition coincides with the theatre troupes 50th anniversary of its formation.

== Documentary ==
The Cockettes were the subject of an eponymous documentary film, directed by Bill Weber and David Weissman, that debuted at the 2002 Sundance Film Festival. It went on to a limited theatrical release and to play the film festival circuit. At the premiere at San Francisco's Castro Theatre many of the surviving Cockettes attended in genderfuck drag. The Cockettes received the LA Film Critics Award as Best Non-Fiction Film of 2002 and the Glitter Award for Best Documentary of 2003.
