= David Weissman (documentary filmmaker) =

Filmmaker, activist and public speaker

David Weissman is an American filmmaker, producer and director. His works include the Emmy-nominated We Were Here documentary and The Cockettes, and he is also the director of short films. Both films were nominated for Independent Spirit Awards in the Best Documentary category.

== Early life ==
Weissman was raised in Los Angeles and went to University High School. After moving to San Francisco in 1976, he worked in restaurants, was politically active, and took film classes at City College of San Francisco. He also worked as a legislative aide to San Francisco Supervisor Harry Britt, who served after the assassination of Harvey Milk.

== Career ==
Weissman began filmmaking as a student at the City College of San Francisco in the early 1980s. Beginning in the mid-1980s, he began producing short films. In 1990, he was the first recipient of the Sundance Institute Mark Silverman Fellowship for New Producers, which included an internship on the Joel and Ethan Coen film Barton Fink. He later worked as assistant cameraperson on the Oscar-winning documentary film In the Shadow of the Stars and as well as Terry Zwigoff's Crumb.

In the 1990s, Weissman produced a series of public service announcements that focused on the emotional and psychological toll facing HIV-negative gay men during the AIDS epidemic in the United States.

In 1998, Weissman began producing and co-directing (with Bill Weber) the documentary The Cockettes, which premiered at the 2002 Sundance Film Festival. The Cockettes was broadcast on the Sundance Channel, was nominated for an Independent Spirit Award for Best Documentary of 2002, and was honored as Best Documentary Of The Year at the 2002 LA Film Critics Association Awards.

In 2008, Weissman reconnected with Bill Weber to film interviews that became the basis for the feature documentary film We Were Here, released in 2011 at the Sundance Film Festival and in 2012 as a PBS Independent Lens documentary. We Were Here was nominated for an Independent Spirit Award for Best Documentary of 2011, and was on the short-list for the Best Documentary Academy Award.

In 2014, he began working on a documentary interview series, Conversations with Gay Elders, in which he works in partnership with gay men in their 20s and 30s as editors to profile gay men in their 70s and 80s. The first interview in the series was released in 2017. The project wrapped up in 2020, with six interviews having been released.

In 2007, Weissman co-founded (with Russ Gage) QDoc, a queer documentary film festival in Portland, Oregon.
