= Pagoda Palace =

Movie theatre in San Francisco, California, U.S.

Pagoda Palace Theatre
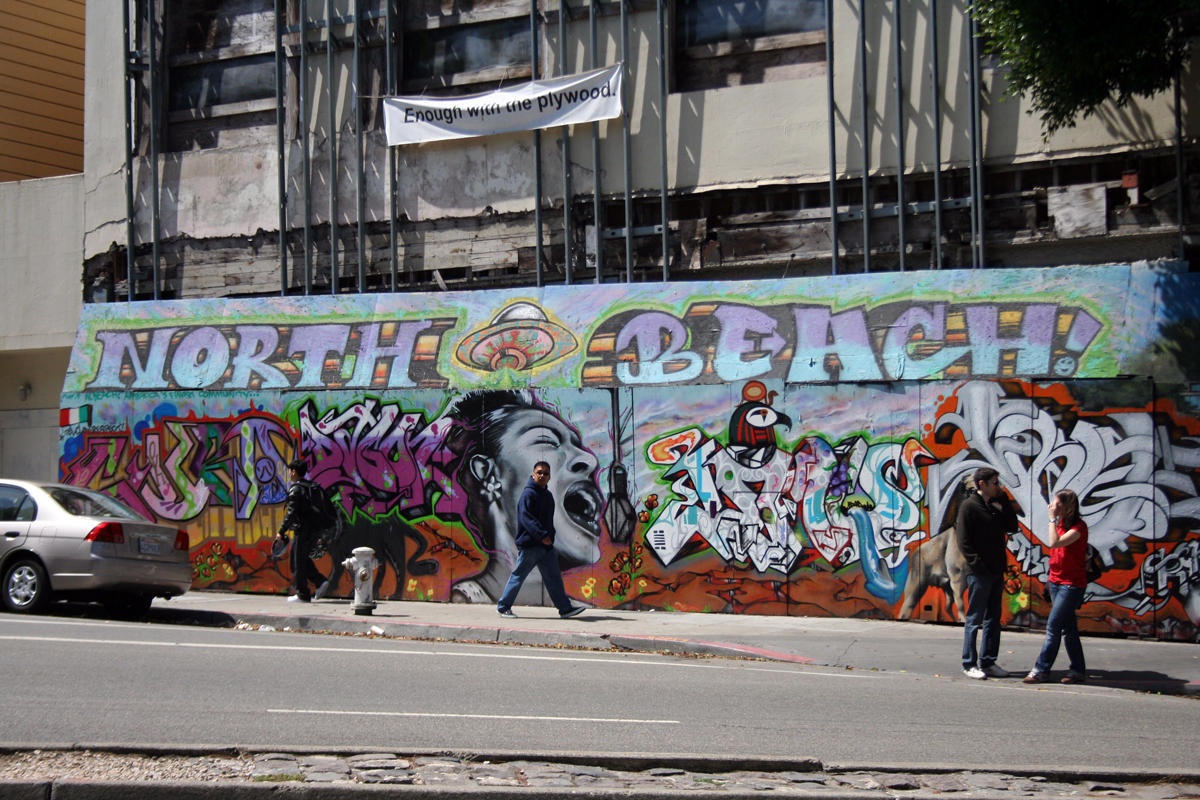
- The boarded-up Pagoda Palace hosted a mural before being demolished.

- Location within San Francisco
- Former names: Washington Square Theater; Milano Theater; Palace Theater
- Address: 1731 Powell Street
- Coordinates: 37.800803°N 122.410994°W
- Capacity: 1,000

Construction
- Built: 1907–1909
- Renovated: 1928, 1937, 1967
- Closed: 1994
- Demolished: 2013

Pagoda Palace was a movie theater in San Francisco's North Beach neighborhood on Columbus Avenue opposite Washington Square. It operated as a vaudeville theater and movie house before being torn down in 2013.

== History ==
Signora Antonietta Pisanelli opened the theater in 1907 or 1909 as the Washington Square Theater, a vaudeville or Italian theater. It was built on the site of the first Holy Trinity Orthodox Cathedral, which was completed in 1888 but destroyed in the San Francisco earthquake and fire of 1906. The theater could seat 1,000 patrons for dramas and opera. In 1909, the theater hosted a benefit concert for Emilio Rivola. When "Sunny Jim" Rolph ran for mayor of San Francisco, several rallies were held for Rolph at the Washington Square Theater in 1911.

It was converted into a movie theater in 1928, and changed its name several times over its history, being called the Milano Theater (at the end of the 1920s) and the Palace Theater (in 1938 or 1939) before finally becoming the Pagoda Palace in 1967. As the Pagoda Palace, it specialized in Chinese-language films and hosted The Cockettes, a midnight drag revue, from 1969 to 1971. In 1986, the theater began showing films on a repertory basis as The Palace (dropping "Pagoda") after the Renaissance Rialto chain assumed operations. The theater discontinued operations and the building was vacant starting in 1994; various conversion plans, including a Rite Aid drugstore, fell through after opposition from local government and neighborhood groups. Rite Aid had initially planned to convert the building into a 24-hour pharmacy; after that proposal was withdrawn, civic leaders floated the idea of a combined cinema/cafe/bookstore complex.

In 1999, plans were announced to rebrand the building as Muriel's Theater, specializing in live theater. The front facade was removed in preparation for the rebranding, but the project fell through following the collapse of the dot-com bubble in 2000, and the temporary plywood became the public face of the Pagoda Palace. Joel Campos purchased the building in 2004 and proposed several different projects, none of which came to fruition due to neighborhood opposition, despite receiving approval in 2009 to convert the building into condominiums. By that time, the theater had been stripped of its interior and exterior furnishings and decorations, and retained very little historical integrity. The vacant building served as a campaign sign for Lynn Jefferson in 2008, a candidate to replace the termed-out Board of Supervisors member Aaron Peskin. Jefferson had adopted the slogan "Enough with the plywood" and posted it on the theater in reference to Peskin's policies and the notorious opposition to Pagoda redevelopment by the neighborhood group Telegraph Hill Dwellers, led at that time by Peskin's wife, Nancy Shanahan. After Campos's insurance firm refused to underwrite the policy because of the building's corroded blade sign, the local architecture firm Page & Turnbull evaluated the sign's historical significance in 2009, stating that it could be removed to address liability concerns, but further recommending the sign be dismantled and stored.

=== Central Subway Tunnel Boring Machine Extraction Site Special Use District ===
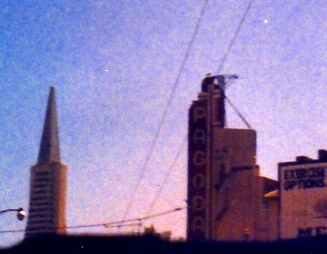
The theater's vertical sign as seen from Columbus Avenue in 1992.

The site was reclassified as the Central Subway Tunnel Boring Machine Extraction Site Special Use District in 2013 by the San Francisco Board of Supervisors as part of a compromise agreement between the City of San Francisco and the property owner, Joel Campos. Under the terms of the agreement, the city would lease the property to extract the tunnel boring machines (TBMs) "Big Alma" and "Mom Chung" (named, respectively, for "Big" Alma Spreckels and Dr. Margaret "Mom" Chung), and in return, the property would be reclassified to exempt the planned condominium building from certain Planning Code regulations, including off-street parking and building height. The exemptions allowed the new planned building to match the features, footprint, and height of the demolished theater.

The extraction of the TBMs was controversial, as other notable tunnel excavation projects have ended with the TBMs entombed underground, and extension of the Central Subway tunnel could potentially threaten the foundations of neighboring buildings. Nevertheless, a two-year, $3.15 million lease agreement was made between the City and Campos, the property owner. Extending the tunnel to the Pagoda site would lay the groundwork for a potential future Muni Metro station in North Beach, and was offered as a compromise instead of digging up Columbus Street to retrieve the TBMs, which would have disrupted traffic and slowed local business.

=== Demolition ===
The theater was torn down later in August 2013 after being vacant for 20 years and the site was used for removal of the Central Subway's tunnel boring machines. The National Trust for Historic Preservation cited the site as one of ten historic sites lost in 2013.

=== Redevelopment ===
The owner of the site received approval in 2009 from the City Planning Commission to build an eighteen-unit luxury condominium complex, with a ground-floor restaurant. After the building was razed, City Supervisors Julie Christensen and Scott Wiener raised the idea for the city to purchase the site in preparation for the third phase of T-Third line expansion, which has been proposed to run the Muni Metro line past North Beach to Fisherman's Wharf. The city lease on the property expired on May 10, 2015. A spokesman for Campos, the site's owner, stated in 2015 that construction of a condominium complex (revised to nineteen units) would go forward as approved under the 2009 plans. A November 2015 policy analysis report commissioned by Supervisor Christensen identified three neighboring alternate sites that could be used to construct a proposed North Beach station for T-Third.

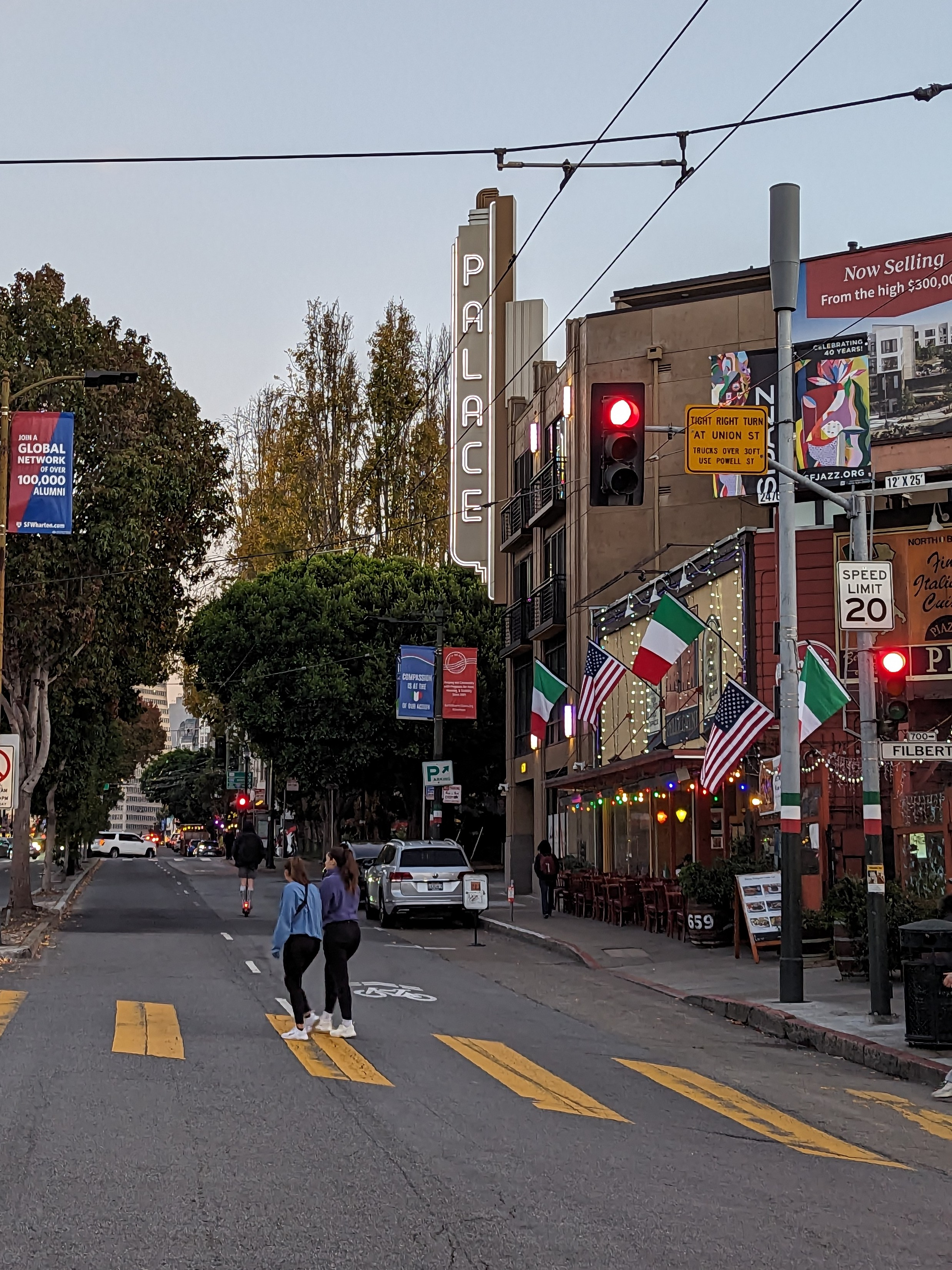
The theater's sign as of 2023 after the site has been redeveloped into condominiums.

Despite speculation that Campos never intended to build on the site and may have been negotiating for a better price from the city, construction of the new The Palace at Washington Square luxury condominiums commenced in March 2016.
