= Dorian Award for Film of the Year =

- Awarded for: Best Film of the Year
- Country: United States
- Presented by: GALECA: The Society of LGBTQ Entertainment Critics
- First award: 2010
- Currently held by: The Substance (2025)
- Website: galeca.org

The Dorian Award for Film of the Year is one of the main categories of Dorian Awards, given annually by GALECA: The Society of LGBTQ Entertainment Critics since 2010 (the group was initially named the Gay and Lesbian Entertainment Critics Association). For the group's 2021 and 2022 awards, the category was temporarily named Best Film, mirroring the revised timelines of other film honors affected by the COVID-19 pandemic.

The Dorians go to both mainstream and LGBTQ-centric content.

== List of winners ==
Key

and bold indicates the winner.

=== 2010s ===
| Year | Film | Director | Ref. |
2010
| 2010 | **A Single Man** | **Tom Ford** | |
| 2010 | Bright Star | Jane Campion | |
| 2010 | 500 Days of Summer | Marc Webb | |
| 2010 | Precious: Based on the Novel Push by Sapphire | Lee Daniels | |
| 2010 | Up | Pete Docter | |
2011
| 2011 | **I Am Love** | **Luca Guadagnino** | |
| 2011 | Black Swan | Darren Aronofsky | |
| 2011 | The Kids Are All Right | Lisa Cholodenko | |
| 2011 | The Social Network | David Fincher | |
| 2011 | Toy Story 3 | Lee Unkrich | |
2012
| 2012 | **Weekend** | **Andrew Haigh** | |
| 2012 | The Skin I Live In | Pedro Almodóvar | |
| 2012 | Midnight in Paris | Woody Allen | |
| 2012 | The Tree of Life | Terrence Malick | |
| 2012 | The Descendants | Alexander Payne | |
| 2012 | The Artist | Michel Hazanavicius | |
2013
| 2013 | **Argo** | **Ben Affleck** | |
| 2013 | Keep the Lights On | Ira Sachs | |
| 2013 | Beasts of the Southern Wild | Benh Zeitlin | |
| 2013 | Les Misérables | Tom Hooper | |
| 2013 | Lincoln | Steven Spielberg | |
| 2013 | Moonrise Kingdom | Wes Anderson | |
2014
| 2014 | **12 Years a Slave** | **Steve McQueen** | |
| 2014 | American Hustle | David O. Russell | |
| 2014 | Blue is the Warmest Colour | Abdellatif Kechiche | |
| 2014 | Dallas Buyers Club | Jean-Marc Vallée | |
| 2014 | Gravity | Alfonso Cuarón | |
| 2014 | Her | Spike Jonze | |
| 2014 | Laurence Anyways | Xavier Dolan | |
2015
| 2015 | **Boyhood** | **Richard Linklater** | |
| 2015 | Birdman or (The Unexpected Virtue of Ignorance) | Alejandro Iñárritu | |
| 2015 | The Grand Budapest Hotel | Wes Anderson | |
| 2015 | The Imitation Game | Morten Tyldum | |
| 2015 | Pride | Matthew Warchus | |
2016
| 2016 | **Carol** | **Todd Haynes** | |
| 2016 | The Big Short | Adam McKay | |
| 2016 | Brooklyn | John Crowley | |
| 2016 | Mad Max: Fury Road | George Miller | |
| 2016 | Spotlight | Tom McCarthy | |
2017
| 2017 | **Moonlight** | **Barry Jenkins** | |
| 2017 | Jackie | Pablo Larraín | |
| 2017 | La La Land | Damien Chazelle | |
| 2017 | Manchester by the Sea | Kenneth Lonergan | |
| 2017 | 20th Century Women | Mike Mills | |
2018
| 2018 | **Call Me by Your Name** | **Luca Guadagnino** | |
| 2018 | 120 BPM (Beats Per Minute) | Robin Campillo | |
| 2018 | Get Out | Jordan Peele | |
| 2018 | Lady Bird | Greta Gerwig | |
| 2018 | The Shape of Water | Guillermo del Toro | |
2019
| 2019 | **The Favourite** | **Yorgos Lanthimos** | |
| 2019 | Can You Ever Forgive Me? | Marielle Heller | |
| 2019 | If Beale Street Could Talk | Barry Jenkins | |
| 2019 | Roma | Alfonso Cuarón | |
| 2019 | A Star is Born | Bradley Cooper | |

=== 2020s ===
| Year | Film | Director | Ref. |
2020
| 2020 | **Parasite** | **Bong Joon-ho** | |
| 2020 | Hustlers | Lorene Scafaria | |
| 2020 | Little Women | Greta Gerwig | |
| 2020 | Pain and Glory | Pedro Almodóvar | |
| 2020 | Portrait of a Lady on Fire | Céline Sciamma | |
| 2020 | Once Upon a Time in Hollywood | Quentin Tarantino | |
2021
| 2021 | **Nomadland** | **Chloé Zhao** | |
| 2021 | First Cow | Kelly Reichardt | |
| 2021 | Minari | Lee Isaac Chung | |
| 2021 | Promising Young Woman | Emerald Fennell | |
| 2021 | Sound of Metal | Darius Marder | |
2022
| 2022 | **The Power of the Dog** | **Jane Campion** | |
| 2022 | Drive My Car | Ryusuke Hamaguchi | |
| 2022 | The Worst Person in the World | Joachim Trier | |
| 2022 | Tick, Tick... Boom! | Lin-Manuel Miranda | |
| 2022 | West Side Story | Steven Spielberg | |
2023
| 2023 | **Everything Everywhere All at Once** | **Daniels (Daniel Kwan and Daniel Scheinert)** | |
| 2023 | Aftersun | Charlotte Wells | |
| 2023 | The Banshees of Inisherin | Martin McDonagh | |
| 2023 | The Fabelmans | Steven Spielberg | |
| 2023 | Tár | Todd Field | |
2024
| 2024 | **All of Us Strangers** | **Andrew Haigh** | |
| 2024 | Barbie | Greta Gerwig | |
| 2024 | May December | Todd Haynes | |
| 2024 | Past Lives | Celine Song | |
| 2024 | Poor Things | Yorgos Lanthimos | |
2025
| 2025 | **The Substance** | **Coralie Fargeat** | |
| 2025 | I Saw the TV Glow | Jane Schoenbrun | |
| 2025 | Nickel Boys | RaMell Ross | |
| 2025 | Challengers | Luca Guadagnino | |
| 2025 | Anora | Sean Baker | |
2026
| 2026 | **Sinners** | **Ryan Coogler** | |
| 2026 | One Battle After Another | Paul Thomas Anderson | |
| 2026 | Marty Supreme | Josh Safdie | |
| 2026 | Hamnet | Chloé Zhao | |

== Directors with multiple wins ==
2 wins

- Andrew Haigh
- Luca Guadagnino

== Directors with multiple nominations ==
3 nominations

- Steven Spielberg
- Greta Gerwig
- Luca Guadagnino

2 nominations

- Jane Campion
- Pedro Almodóvar
- Wes Anderson
- Chloé Zhao
- Alfonso Cuarón
- Todd Haynes
- Andrew Haigh
