= University High School (Los Angeles) =

University High School Charter
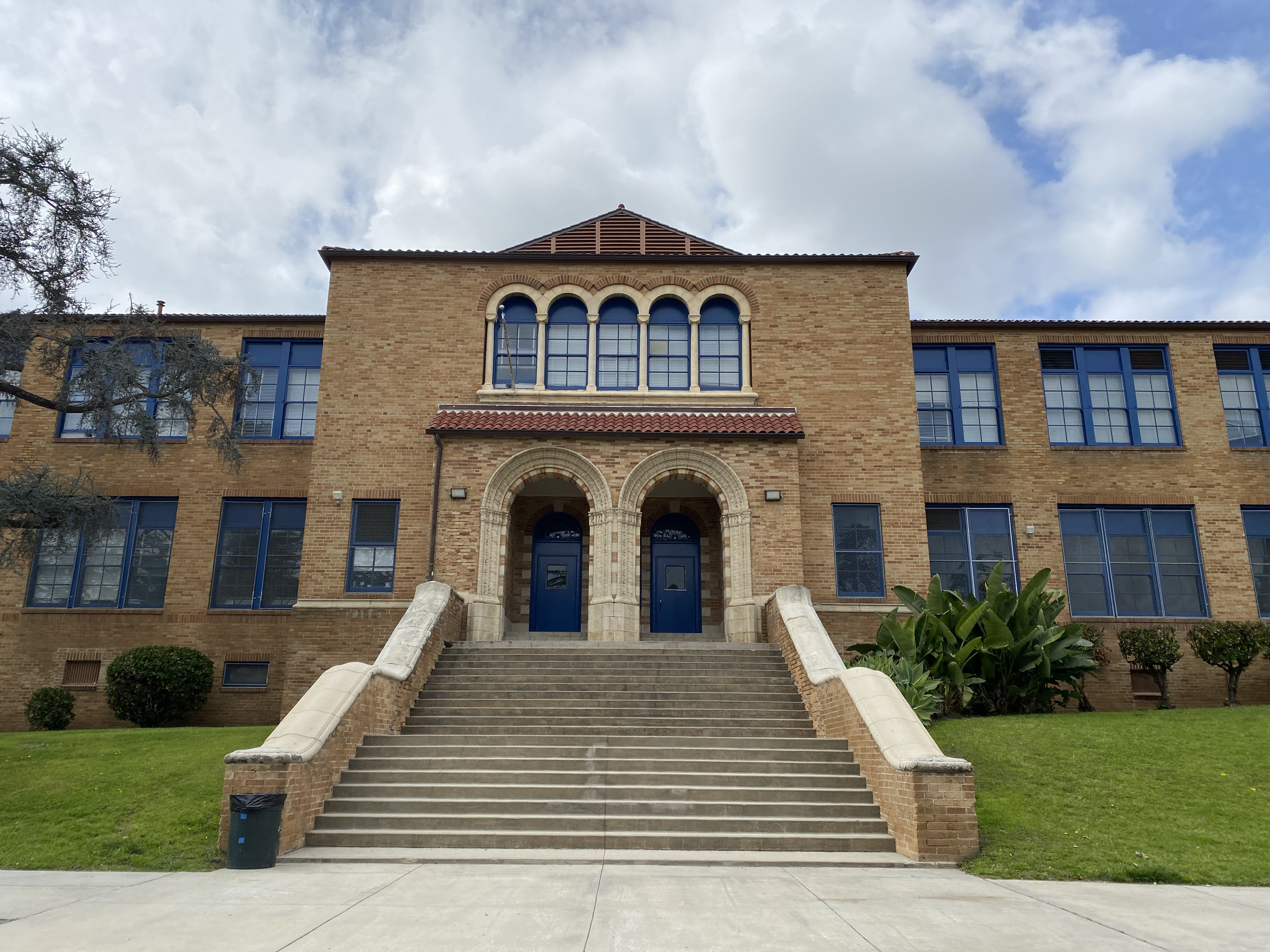

Location
- 11800 Texas Avenue; Los Angeles, California 90025; United States; 34.0456°N 118.461°W

Information
- Type: Public high school
- Established: 1924; 102 years ago
- School district: Los Angeles Unified School District (1961-); Los Angeles City High School District (1924-1961)
- Principal: Claudia Middleton
- Teaching staff: 66.61 (FTE)
- Grades: 9–12
- Enrollment: 1,385 (2025–2026)
- Student to teacher ratio: 21.35
- Campus type: Urban
- Colors: Blue and persimmon
- Athletics conference: CIF Los Angeles City Section; Western League
- Nickname: Wildcats
- Website: universityhs.lausd.org

University High School Charter, commonly known as Uni, is a public secondary school, built 1923–1924, and founded 1924, located in Sawtelle, a district in Los Angeles, California, near the city's border with Santa Monica. University High is part of the Los Angeles Unified School District (LAUSD). The campus also holds Indian Springs Continuation High School. The school contains the Tongva Sacred Springs, a sacred site of the Tongva–Gabrieleño native people and a registered California Historical Landmark.

== History ==
While under construction it was known as Sawtelle High School, but it opened as Warren G. Harding High School when completed in 1924, after 29th President Warren G. Harding (1865-1923, served 1921-1923), who had recently died. The school was renamed in 1929 after the University of California at Los Angeles (UCLA) moved its campus from East Hollywood to Westwood.

The original administration building was designed by the firm Russell & Alpaugh and the construction process began in 1923. The style that was chosen recalls the Romanesque of Northern Italy and Spanish Mission style architecture. The administration building once displayed an octagonal tower and a portico, but these features were toppled in the 1933 Long Beach earthquake. An original cafeteria building was located where the current cafeteria and theater stand today.

Although the gymnasium and a beautiful and widely admired auditorium were condemned following the 1971 Sylmar earthquake, the school's original main building from 1924 remains in use. The music building and gym (rebuilt in the early 1980s) have been scheduled to be taken down because they sit on a fault line and therefore against district policy. As of July 2010, the music building was gone.

It was in the Los Angeles City High School District until 1961, when it merged into LAUSD.

== Other ==
Music classes have been moved to another unused room near the top of the school. The gym was still in use while, on the south end of the campus, in what was formerly a student parking lot, a new gym facility was under construction in 2010. The current football stadium, last rebuilt following the 1994 Northridge earthquake, is named in honor of Jackie Robinson (1919-1972), of Pasadena, California, the first African American professional baseball player in Major League Baseball, playing in 1947-1956 for the Brooklyn Dodgers, who also previously attended nearby UCLA, 1939-1940.

Uni is one of a very few pre-World War II high schools in Los Angeles whose buildings have been at least partially spared by three major earthquakes since its inception. The main building presents a very traditional and dignified appearance, with weathered brick and arched doorways, such that the campus is popular with film crews (see #Filming on campus). One-third of its class of 1942 did not graduate because of the internment of Japanese-Americans.

In fall 2007, some neighborhoods zoned to have their students attend Hamilton High School were rezoned to University High School.

In 2009, Mitchell Landsberg of the Los Angeles Times stated that the school was "struggling to regain its reputation as a center of excellence". That year, as part of a grant program, the Academy of Engineering was established at the high school.

For the entire 88-year history of University High, the football/baseball field had been without stadium lights until they were installed in the Spring of 2012.

== Native American heritage ==
Located on Uni's campus are the Tongva Sacred Springs, California Historical Landmark #522. The springs, called "Kuruvungna" by the native Gabrieleno Tongva people, were used as a source of natural fresh water by the Tongva people since 400 BC, and they continue to produce 22,000-25,000 gallons of water a day. The springs are found at two separate locations on campus. The larger is now closed off from the rest of the campus and is under the care of the Gabrielino/Tongva Springs Foundation. Prior to its being fenced off, the area surrounding the springs and pond into which its waters feed was popular among the students as a place to meet and relax. The other spring is located on the northeastern edge of the so-called Girls' Field. A third spring was located farther north, near Texas Avenue, but it ceased to flow during the 1940s when a local water company began drawing from the aquifer.

The Portolá Expedition of 1769, one of the two expeditions that led to the founding of Los Angeles, camped at the Kuruvunga village while travelling along the route that would become known as El Camino Real. The name Serra comes from Father Junípero Serra the founder of the Alta California mission chain, who is reported to have said Mass to there. In the 1800s, the spring served as the water supply for the city of Santa Monica.

Construction at the school in 1925 unearthed evidence of a Native American village, and in 1975, a grave was discovered from what archaeologists now believe to be a burial site.

In 1980, Indian Springs Continuation High School, which is housed on the part of the campus where the springs are, was opened.

In 1992, tribal descendants, community members, and teachers and students from the school founded the Gabrielino/Tongva Springs Foundation, a non-profit foundation, to fight a proposed development a block north of the springs that would have cut off the springs' underground water source. They successfully fought the proposed parking structure, and since that time, the Foundation has been active at the springs.

That same year, the newly established Foundation held the first annual Life Before Columbus Day event. The event, which takes place just before Columbus Day every year and celebrates the history of the land and of the Tongva people, has been known to draw upward of 600 people some years, including Native Americans from various tribes, local politicians, community members, and students and faculty from the school.

The event includes tours of the Kuruvunga Village site and springs, performances by dancers from the Tongva and Aztec tribe, and storytelling from the Chumash tribe. There are also hands-on activities offered by authentic Native American vendors. The foundation currently leases the site from the Los Angeles Unified School District for their monthly ceremony and guided tours.

== Newspapers ==
=== Wildcat ===
The weekly student newspaper, the Wildcat, is part of the High School National Ad Network. Print issues from the school's inception as Harding High are available in the journalism archives. More recent issues were previously archived online at the "My High School Journalism" site operated by the American Society of Newspaper Editors

=== The Worrier ===
The Worrier was an underground student newspaper that began in 1966. At least seven Worrier staff members were transferred to other high schools, suspended or put on probation.

=== Red Tide ===
The Red Tide was an underground campus newspaper that expressed far-left opinions on the Vietnam War, racism, and women's issues. Its first issue appeared in November 1971. Following the suspension of two students for distributing Red Tide #2, 500-700 Uni students occupied the administration building.

The Red Tide challenged the Warrior mascot as racist. Twenty-five years later, on September 8, 1997, the LAUSD Board of Education voted to remove the mascot as part of a ban on using Native American symbols. In 1975 LA and Bay Area Red Tide branches moved to Detroit, where they organized campaigns to free Gary Tyler and other campaigns against racism.

== Mascot controversy ==
The Warrior, University High's mascot as it appeared pre-controversy

The school's mascot was formerly the Warrior, but was changed after the Southern California Indian Center petitioned the LAUSD to eliminate the mascots and names of all schools that had American Indian mascot and names. In 1997 the LAUSD decided to eliminate all American Indian mascots. The LAUSD decision was upheld in federal court, but the California Racial Mascots Act, a bill which would eliminate American Indian mascots and names statewide, was vetoed by California Governor Arnold Schwarzenegger twice.

Towards the end of the 1997–1998 school year, students were allowed to vote on a new school mascot. Students chose the "Wildcats" over the "Gators" and "Jaguars". The Class of 1985 had, as a senior project and gift to the school, painted a large Warrior mascot on the south entrance to the gym building. Shortly after the mascot change, this was painted over with its feline animal replacement.

== School information ==
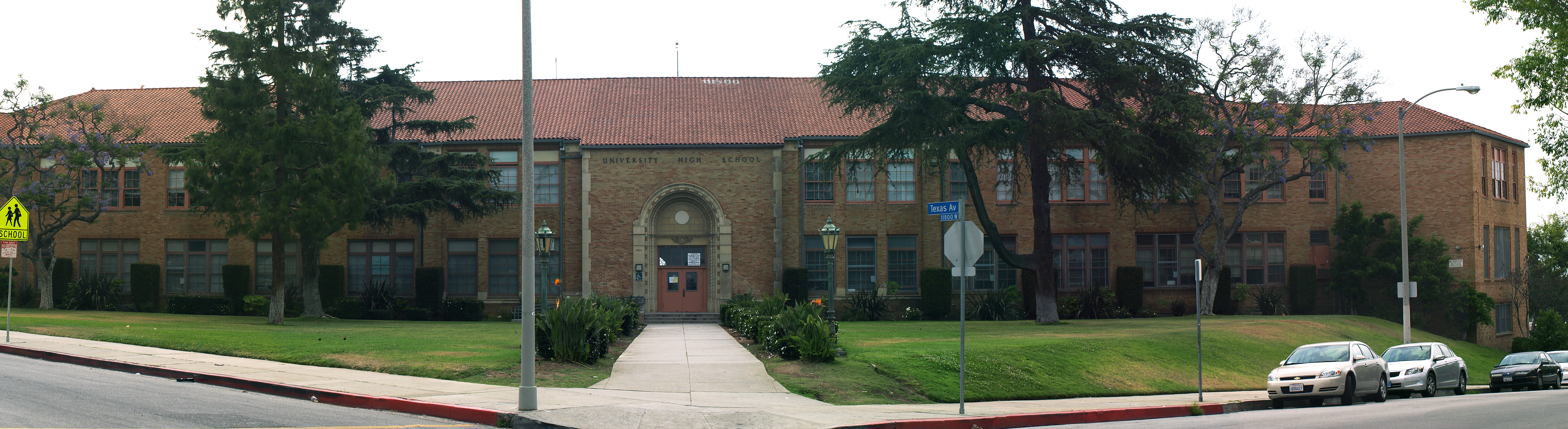
Street view

- The Los Angeles School District provides open enrollment dates which start in late April and the beginning of March. The best way to contact schools is by phone or email. University High School provides tours; however, before and during enrollment, parents are able to submit a variety of applications for the students to enroll in different schools.
- University High School
- The school provides transportation.
- Three languages are taught at Uni: French, Spanish, and Mandarin.
- Extracurriculars for boys and girls

== Demographics ==
According to the School Information Branch:

- In 2008-09, 61.5% of students were Latino or Hispanic and 17% were African-American. 48.5% of students were female.
- In 2009-10, 62.5% Hispanic/Latino, 8.6% White, 16.3% African-Americans, 0.3% Pac Isl, 0.0% Filipino, 12.2% Asian and 0.1% AI/Alsk
- In 2010-11 61.0% Hispanics/Latino, 17.6% African-Americans, 8.9% White, 0.3% Pac Isl, 2.0% Filipino, 9.9% Asian, and 0.4% Al/Alsk
- In 2011-2012 58.7% Hispanics/Latino, 16.7% African-Americans, 10.9% White, 0.5% Pac Isl, 2.1% Filipino, 10.5% Asian, and 0.5% Al/Alsk
- In 2012-13, 59.5% were Latino or Hispanic, 9.7% were White, 17.9% African-American, 0.4% Pac Isl 1.9% Filipino, 10.0% Asian, and 0.6% AI/Alsk
- In 2018-19, 53% of students were Latino or Hispanic, 25% African-American, 12.8% white, 6.8% Asian, 1.9% Filipino.

== Attendance area ==
Neighborhoods served by University High are parts of West Los Angeles, including portions of Brentwood Beverly Hills Post Office (BHPO), Westwood, Bel-Air, and the Wilshire Corridor.

Like other Westside high schools such as Westchester and Palisades, University High School enrolls a diverse mix of students from its enrollment area and various parts of the city; on top of Westside neighborhoods, Uni draws students from areas such as Koreatown and South Los Angeles. The school also enrolls many Capacity Adjustment Program students who come from areas zoned to heavily overcrowded high schools.

Two new LAUSD high schools opened in fall 2005, four more in fall 2006, and one more in fall 2007, decreasing the number of transfer students in other high schools.

== Name change ==
Starting in the 2018-2019 school year, University became an affiliated charter school and changed its name to University High School Charter. Affiliated charter schools receive flexibility in the utilization of the charter school categorical block grant (for those applicable affiliated charter schools that receive it) areas of curriculum and professional development; some aspects of local school governance; and some aspects of employee selection. It is not necessary to utilize the District’s permit process if accepted to an Affiliated Charter School. It is a community school that welcomes students from all over Los Angeles. However, non-resident students are required to complete a Unified Enrollment application.

== Filming on campus ==
The school, which has been able to maintain much of its original architecture, is one of the few Los Angeles schools with buildings constructed before World War II. Its brick facades, wide hallways, and "unique east coast look" make the school an attractive place to film. The administration, which allows filming during school hours, moves classes as needed and allows productions to make minor changes to the campus, has a long history of bringing in filming (and the money that goes with it) to the school.

The use of the school for filming is a controversial one. Filming often takes place during school hours, and students and teachers are moved from classrooms and walkways are blocked off as needed. The school often undergoes renovations for filming, anything from retiling and painting, to temporary removal of furniture and lockers. These disruptions are a cause for students and teacher complaints.

Past articles in the Wildcat addressed not only the disruption to students, but how the money made from the constant filming is spent. Editorials have complained about the portion of the money that goes to the LAUSD, and the way the money is spent by the school.

University High charges the standard district fee for each day of filming (currently $2,500). A portion of the money earned goes to FilmL.A., Inc., formerly named the Entertainment Industry Development Corporation, which acts as an intermediary between the LAUSD and the entertainment industry. The name change, which followed the naming of a new president and finance chief and came as the company was preparing to relocate its headquarters and implement a revised contract with the Los Angeles City Council, helped distance the private non-profit from its "bureaucratic and scandal-ridden image."

In March 2005, the LAUSD entered into a new three-year contract with the EIDC, after soliciting bids from other vendors. Ruben Rojas, the LAUSD's director of revenue enhancement, said that the district choose to continue working with the EIDC because of "its proven track record and ability to deal with complex film-permitting issues.". Indeed, during that time, FilmL.A. expanded the number of schools that had hosted on-location filming from 19 schools to more than 200 schools: coordinating 1,500 film shoots at 250 LAUSD sites. The LAUSD's filming profits for the 2003-2004 school year generated almost one million dollars, and the district is on target to for an annual film revenue increase to at least $1.5 million.

The doubling of the LAUSD's film revenue in the four years since FilmL.A. was original hired in March 2002 was a contributing factor to Burbank Unified School District's decision to hire Film L.A. in July 2006.

Under FilmL.A.'s current contract with the city, the company receives "a 16% management fee based on the total use fee". 75 percent of the remaining filming monies go to the individual schools that host the on-location shooting to be used at the school's discretion, and 25 percent goes to a district fund that benefits schools that do not generate film revenues of their own.

Uni High distributes among the departments the first $12,000 made each year from on-campus filming. The Budget Committee makes spending recommendations for any additional monies. Recent budget cuts have made filming at schools more attractive. In 2004, the number of schools volunteering to be film locations grew from 19 to 160 and the district's annual film revenue doubled to $1 million. In 2005, LAUSD officials revised the district's fee structure for the first time since 1992. The revision included extending a full day of shooting from 14 to 15 hours, and a daily rate increase from $1,700 to $2,500.

Uni has been noted in the press as being one of the more popular schools for filming, even compared to other local schools with similar structure and appearance. Between 2001 and 2003, 38 movies, TV shows and commercials were filmed at University High. This popularity, with both its positive and negative impacts, is credited to the Assistant Principal who is responsible for the filming on campus.

In November 2006, Drillbit Taylor, starring Owen Wilson began filming at Uni. As of April 2007, the $90,000 received for this production is the most that the school has made on an individual filming contract. Uni underwent massive renovations in order to prepare for the filming of Drillbit Taylor. The interior and exterior of the main building were painted, and the main building was retiled as well. The facade of the building was altered to read "McKinley High School", and plants and grass patches were added throughout the school.

These changes were unusual not only because the extent and timing of the changes meant that construction took place during the school year, but also because Drillbit Taylor production did not pay for the re-tiling. The district had provided money to re-tile floors throughout the LAUSD, so the re-tiling of the floors itself was not unusual or controversial. However, as the film's production needs guided the color choices for the re-tiling and the schedule for construction, many students were upset by the behavior of the movie company and the school.

Below is an incomplete list of productions that have filmed at University High:

=== Movies ===
- Billie, 1965
- Pretty Maids All in a Row, 1971
- Brian at Seventeen, 1971
- Fatal Games, 1984
- Rock ‘n’ Roll High School Forever, 1991
- Jawbreaker, 1999
- Shriek If You Know What I Did Last Friday the Thirteenth, 2000
- The Hot Chick, 2002
- The Battle of Shaker Heights, 2003
- Bruce Almighty, 2003
- Raise Your Voice, 2004
- Surviving Christmas, 2004
- Freedom Writers, 2007
- Drillbit Taylor, 2008
- Miss March, 2008
- Pineapple Express, 2008
- Superhero Movie, 2008
- Starstruck 2010
- Valentine's Day, 2010
- Detention, 2011
- Straight Outta Compton, 2015
- The Wedding Ringer, 2015
- The Fallout, 2021

=== Television ===
- My So-Called Life, 1994–1995
- 7th Heaven, from 1996–2007, University High served as Kennedy High School
- Even Stevens, aired 2000 - 2003
- Lizzie McGuire, aired 2001–2004
- Arrested Development, aired 2003–2006
- Joan of Arcadia, aired 2003–2005
- Oliver Beene, 2003–2004
- Parenthood, aired March 2010
- Criminal Minds: Suspect Behavior, aired 2011, Episode "Here Is the Fire"
- Shameless, aired 2011-2021

==== Individual episodes ====
- Amazing Stories, episode 102, "The Main Attraction", aired October 6, 1985
- Charmed, episode 76, "A Paige From the Past", aired January 17, 2002
- The Flannerys, pilot, shot 2003
- The Division, season finale, shot May 2004
- High School Undercover, pilot, shot March 2004
- JAG, shot March 2004
- Filmore Middle, pilot, shot 2005
- Day Break, pilot, shot 2007
- Privileged, 2008
- 90210, "The Dionysian Debacle", filmed in early 2009
- Ghost Whisperer, filmed on October 12, 2009
- Lincoln Heights, summer 2009
- Modern Family, aired 2011
- The Mentalist, aired 2012
- Fresh Off the Boat, Season 4 Episode 9, 2017
- The Orville, Season 3 Episode 3, 2022

=== Other ===
- The Crystal Method's music video "Name of the Game", 2002
- JoJo's music video "Leave (Get Out)", 2004
- Jordan Pruitt's music video "Outside Looking In", 2006
- Blink 182's music video "Bored to Death", 2016
- Khalid's music video "Young Dumb & Broke", 2017

== Notable alumni ==
- List of University High School (Los Angeles) alumni

== Sources ==
- Satzman, Darrell (March 25, 2002). "LAUSD auditioning to land bigger role in Hollywood (Up Front)". Los Angeles Business Journal. pp. 1–3. Archived from the original on September 30, 2007.
