= Richard Worman =

American politician

Member of the Indiana Senate from the 14th district
- In office November 8, 1978 – November 4, 1998
- Preceded by: Woodrow Wilson
- Succeeded by: Bud Meeks

Member of the Indiana House of Representatives from the 14th district
- In office November 8, 1972 – November 3, 1976
- Preceded by: Ella Frances Henderson Gaylord
- Succeeded by: Marna Jo Neuhouser Worman

Personal details
- Born: July 3, 1933 (age 93) Noble County, Indiana, U.S.
- Party: Republican
- Spouse: Marna Jo Neuhouser
- Children: five
- Occupation: insurance executive

Richard W. Worman (born July 3, 1933) is an American former politician from the state of Indiana. A Republican, he served in the Indiana House of Representatives and Indiana State Senate in a legislative career spanning 1972 to 1998. He is an insurance executive and Chartered Life Underwriter.
