= Howard Worman =

American physician

Howard J. Worman (born 1959) is an American physician and cell biologist. He is Professor of Medicine and Pathology and Cell Biology at Columbia University and Attending Physician at NewYork-Presbyterian Hospital.

== Education ==
Worman majored in chemistry and biology at Cornell University, from where he received a B.A. degree in 1981. He received a M.D. degree from the University of Chicago Pritzker School of Medicine in 1985. Worman trained in internal medicine at New York Hospital and then did postdoctoral research in cell biology in the laboratory of Günter Blobel at Rockefeller University. He obtained additional postdoctoral clinical training in liver disease with Fenton Schaffner at Mount Sinai Hospital in New York.

== Career ==
Worman's first faculty position was as assistant professor of Medicine and Molecular Biology at the Mount Sinai School of Medicine in 1990. He was recruited to Columbia University in 1995, where he is currently Professor of Medicine and Pathology and Cell Biology. His research is primarily focused on inner nuclear membrane proteins, the nuclear lamina, the group of diseases known as laminopathies and liver diseases including primary biliary cholangitis and non-alcoholic fatty liver disease.

== Publications ==
Worman has over 200 publications in cell biology and medicine. He has also authored trade books on liver diseases, including The Liver Disorders and Hepatitis Sourcebook.

== Personal life ==
Worman is married to Terry Chun; they have two children Maxwell Worman and Naomi Worman.

== Honors and awards ==
- Phi Beta Kappa
- American Society for Clinical Investigation
- Association of American Physicians
