= We Were Here (2011 film) =

- Directed by: David Weissman director; Bill Weber editor/ co-director
- Produced by: David Weissman
- Cinematography: Marsha Kahm
- Edited by: Bill Weber
- Music by: Holcombe Waller
- Release date: September 2011 (U.S.)
- Running time: 90 mins
- Country: United States
- Language: English

We Were Here is a 2011 American documentary film about the HIV/AIDS crisis in San Francisco. The film, produced and directed by David Weissman with editor and co-director Bill Weber, premiered at the Sundance Film Festival in January 2011, with its international festival premiere following at the Berlin International Film Festival in February 2011. The theatrical premiere took place at the Castro Theatre in San Francisco on February 25, 2011.

== People interviewed ==
The film focuses on five different interviews of people that had a protagonist role during the epidemic. These people are, in order of appearance:

- Ed Wolf, a counselor to many gay men
- Paul Boneberg, a political activist
- Daniel Goldstein, an HIV+ artist who lost two partners to AIDS
- Guy Clark, a dancer who ran a corner flower stand near the Castro, supplying flowers to many funerals
- Eileen Glutzer, a nurse who helped administer clinical trials for antiretroviral drugs

== Reception ==
We Were Here holds a 100% rating on review aggregator Rotten Tomatoes based on 43 reviews, and a 94% rating on Metacritic based on 11 reviews, which are the highest among films released in 2011.

== Awards ==
Award	Category	Result	Ref
Detroit Film Critics Society	Best Documentary	Nominated	
Dorian Awards	Documentary of the Year	Won	
Dorian Awards	LGBT-Themed Documentary of the Year	Won	
GLAAD Media Awards	Outstanding Documentary	Nominated	
Independent Spirit Awards	Best Documentary Feature	Nominated	
Mumbai Queer Film Festival	Best Documentary Feature, Jury award	Won	
Miami International Film Festival	Knight Dox Competition, Grand Jury Prize	Nominated	
Newport Beach Film Festival	Best Feature Documentary Film, Jury Award	Honorable mention	
Sundance Film Festival	Documentary, Grand Jury Prize	Nominated	

== See also ==
- And the Band Played On (1993)
- How to Survive a Plague (2012)
