= The Cockettes (film) =

- DVD cover
- Directed by: Bill Weber; David Weissman
- Produced by: David Weissman
- Starring: The Cockettes
- Cinematography: Marsha Kahm
- Edited by: Bill Weber
- Music by: Richard "Scrumbly" Koldewyn
- Production company: Grandelusion
- Distributed by: Strand Releasing
- Release dates: January 16, 2002 (Sundance); May 10, 2002
- Running time: 102 minutes
- Country: United States
- Language: English
- Budget: $300,000
- Box office: $220,165

The Cockettes is a 2002 American documentary film about the 1960s–70s San Francisco performance group of the same name. Co-directed by Bill Weber and David Weissman, and produced by Weissman, the film debuted at the 2002 Sundance Film Festival, where it was nominated for the Grand Jury Prize. It also received the LA Film Critics Award for Best Documentary of 2002.

== Cast ==
- Sylvia Miles
- John Waters
- Holly Woodlawn
- Dusty Dawn
- Larry Brinkin
- John Flowers
- Goldie Glitters
- Ann Harris
- Fayette Hauser
- Michael Kalmen
- Maureen Orth
- Peter Mintun
- Fayette Hauser

Archive footage

- Divine
- Candy Darling
- Jackie Curtis
- Hibiscus
- Angela Lansbury
- Anthony Perkins
- Ronald Reagan
- Ahmet Ertegun
- Gore Vidal
- Sylvester
- Allen Ginsberg
- The Grateful Dead
- Taylor Mead
- Peggy Cass
- Richard and Tricia Nixon
- John Rothermel

== Reception ==
On the review aggregator website Rotten Tomatoes, 91% of 43 critics' reviews are positive. The website's consensus reads: "Absorbing, fascinating, and finally poignant, The Cockettes provides a colorful, eye-opening view of the counterculture 1960s." Metacritic, which uses a weighted average, assigned the film a score of 77 out of 100, based on 22 critics, indicating "generally favorable reviews".

== DVD release ==
The Cockettes was released on Region 1 DVD on January 21, 2003.

== See also ==
- Dzi Croquettes, a documentary film about a Brazilian ensemble inspired by the Cockettes.
