= List of accolades received by The Hateful Eight =

The Hateful Eight awards and nominations
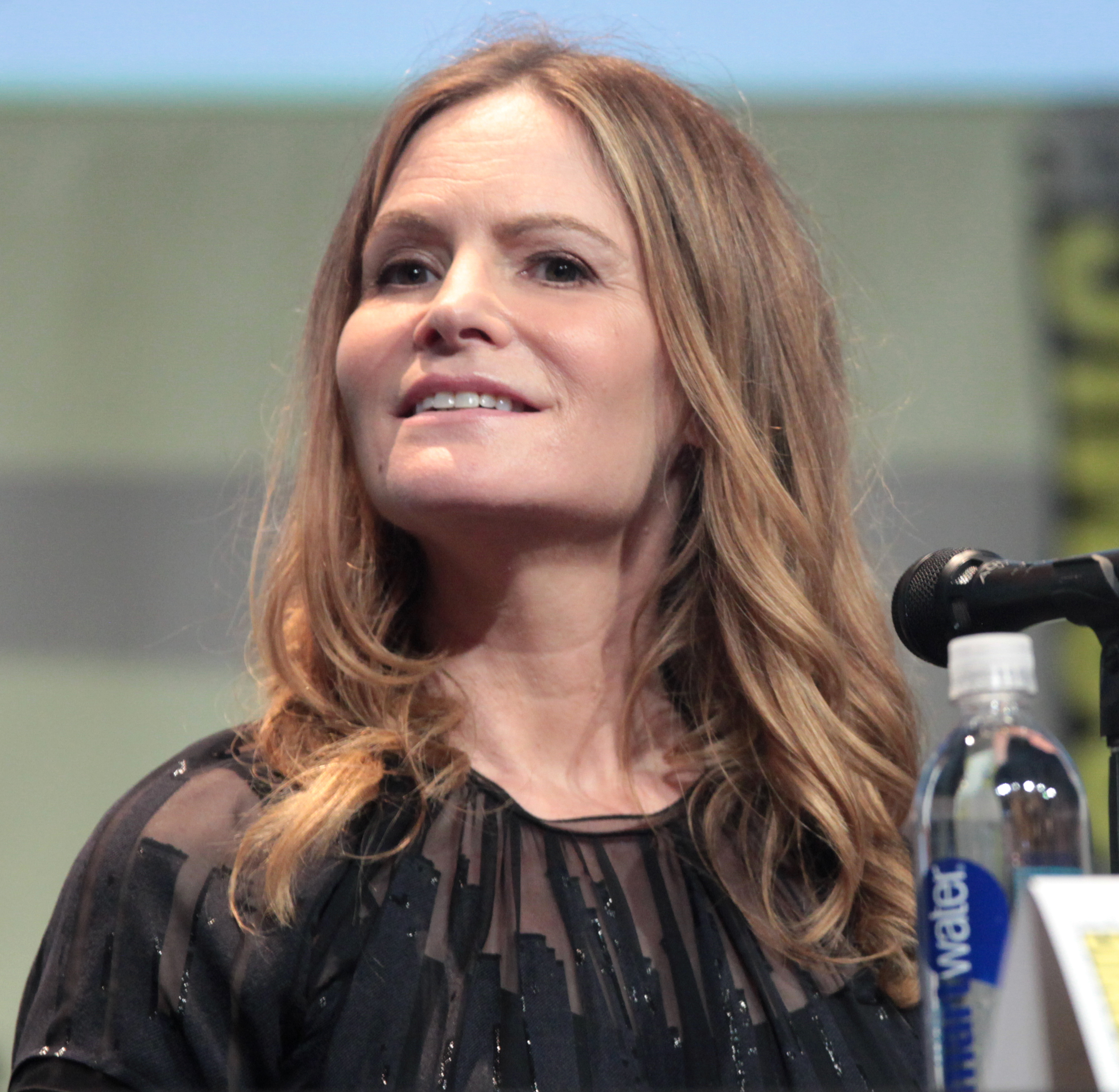
- Jennifer Jason Leigh received praise for her performance and earned an Academy Award nomination for Best Supporting Actress.
Awards and nominations
Award	Wins	Nominations
AACTA Awards	0	1
Academy Awards	1	3
Alliance of Women Film Journalists	1	2
Austin Film Critics Association Awards	1	5
British Academy Film Awards	1	3
Capri Hollywood International Film Festival	5	5
Chicago Film Critics Association Awards	1	4
Cinema Audio Society Awards	0	1
Critics' Choice Movie Awards	1	6
Dallas–Fort Worth Film Critics Association Awards	0	2
Detroit Film Critics Society Awards	0	3
Empire Awards	0	3
Florida Film Critics Circle Awards	0	3
Georgia Film Critics Association Awards	1	2
Golden Globe Awards	1	3
Golden Trailer Awards	2	6
Grammy Awards	0	2
Hollywood Film Awards	1	1
Houston Film Critics Society Awards	1	4
International Cinephile Society Awards	1	5
National Board of Review	3	3
San Diego Film Critics Society Awards	2	4
Saturn Awards	0	5
St. Louis Film Critics Association Awards	1	4
Vancouver Film Critics Circle	0	1
Village Voice Film Poll	0	1
Washington D.C. Area Film Critics Association Awards	0	3

Totals (Note: Certain award groups do not simply award one winner. They acknowledge several different recipients, have runners-up, and have third place. Since this is a specific recognition and is different from losing an award, runner-up mentions are considered wins in this award tally. For simplification and to avoid errors, each award in this list has been presumed to have had a prior nomination.)
- Wins: 27
- Nominations: 88

The Hateful Eight is a 2015 American Revisionist Western film written and directed by Quentin Tarantino. It stars Samuel L. Jackson, Kurt Russell, Jennifer Jason Leigh, Walton Goggins, Demián Bichir, Tim Roth, Michael Madsen, and Bruce Dern as eight strangers who seek refuge from a blizzard in a stagecoach stopover, a decade after the American Civil War. The film was theatrically released by The Weinstein Company on December 25, 2015. It grossed $156.5 million worldwide and was met with generally favorable reviews from critics. On the review aggregator website Rotten Tomatoes, 74% of 337 critics' reviews are positive, with an average rating of 7.3/10.

The film was praised for its screenplay, score, cinematography, and Leigh's performance. It is the first Tarantino film to feature an original score, which was composed by Ennio Morricone. At the Academy Awards, Leigh received a nomination for Best Supporting Actress, Robert Richardson was nominated for Best Cinematography, and Morricone winning for Best Original Score. At the BAFTA Awards, the film was also nominated for Best Actress in a Supporting Role and Best Original Screenplay, and won Best Original Music. The Golden Globes gave the film nominations in the same categories and awarded Morricone for Best Original Score. Morricone also received two Grammy nominations for his composition. The National Board of Review awarded the film with Best Supporting Actress and Best Original Screenplay, and named The Hateful Eight one of the top ten films of 2015.

== Accolades ==
Accolades received by The Hateful Eight
Award	Date of ceremony	Category	Recipient(s)	Result	Ref.
AACTA Awards	January 29, 2016	Best Supporting Actress	Jennifer Jason Leigh	Nominated	
Academy Awards	February 28, 2016	Best Supporting Actress	Jennifer Jason Leigh	Nominated	
Academy Awards	February 28, 2016	Best Cinematography	Robert Richardson	Nominated	
Academy Awards	February 28, 2016	Best Original Score	Ennio Morricone	Won	
Alliance of Women Film Journalists	January 12, 2016	Best Film Music or Score	Ennio Morricone	Won	
Alliance of Women Film Journalists	January 12, 2016	Movie You Wanted to Love, But Just Couldn't	The Hateful Eight	Nominated	
Austin Film Critics Association Awards	December 29, 2015	Best Director	Quentin Tarantino	Nominated	
Austin Film Critics Association Awards	December 29, 2015	Best Supporting Actress	Jennifer Jason Leigh	Nominated	
Austin Film Critics Association Awards	December 29, 2015	Best Original Screenplay	Quentin Tarantino	Nominated	
Austin Film Critics Association Awards	December 29, 2015	Best Cinematography	Robert Richardson	Nominated	
Austin Film Critics Association Awards	December 29, 2015	Best Score	Ennio Morricone	Won	
British Academy Film Awards	February 14, 2016	Best Actress in a Supporting Role	Jennifer Jason Leigh	Nominated	
British Academy Film Awards	February 14, 2016	Best Original Screenplay	Quentin Tarantino	Nominated	
British Academy Film Awards	February 14, 2016	Best Original Music	Ennio Morricone	Won	
Capri Hollywood International Film Festival	January 2, 2016	Capri Movie of the Year Award	The Hateful Eight	Won	
Capri Hollywood International Film Festival	January 2, 2016	Capri Actor Award	Samuel L. Jackson	Won	
Capri Hollywood International Film Festival	January 2, 2016	Capri Supporting Actress Award	Jennifer Jason Leigh	Won	
Capri Hollywood International Film Festival	January 2, 2016	Capri Producer Award	Bob Weinstein and Harvey Weinstein	Won	
Capri Hollywood International Film Festival	January 2, 2016	Capri Score Award	Ennio Morricone	Won	
Chicago Film Critics Association Awards	December 16, 2015	Best Supporting Actress	Jennifer Jason Leigh	Nominated	
Chicago Film Critics Association Awards	December 16, 2015	Best Original Screenplay	Quentin Tarantino	Nominated	
Chicago Film Critics Association Awards	December 16, 2015	Best Cinematography	Robert Richardson	Nominated	
Chicago Film Critics Association Awards	December 16, 2015	Best Original Score	Ennio Morricone	Won	
Cinema Audio Society Awards	February 20, 2016	Outstanding Achievement in Sound Mixing for a Motion Picture – Live Action	The Hateful Eight (Note: Nominees: Mark Ulano (production mixer), Michael Minkler (re-recording mixer), Christian P. Minkler (re-recording mixer), Fabio Venturi (scoring mixer), and Nerses Gezalyan (foley mixer))	Nominated	
Critics' Choice Movie Awards	January 17, 2016	Best Supporting Actress	Jennifer Jason Leigh	Nominated	
Critics' Choice Movie Awards	January 17, 2016	Best Acting Ensemble	The Hateful Eight	Nominated	
Critics' Choice Movie Awards	January 17, 2016	Best Screenplay	Quentin Tarantino	Nominated	
Critics' Choice Movie Awards	January 17, 2016	Best Cinematography	Robert Richardson	Nominated	
Critics' Choice Movie Awards	January 17, 2016	Best Score	Ennio Morricone	Won	
Critics' Choice Movie Awards	January 17, 2016	Best Makeup	The Hateful Eight	Nominated	
Dallas–Fort Worth Film Critics Association Awards	December 14, 2015	Best Supporting Actress	Jennifer Jason Leigh	Nominated	
Dallas–Fort Worth Film Critics Association Awards	December 14, 2015	Best Musical Score	Ennio Morricone	Nominated	
Detroit Film Critics Society Awards	December 14, 2015	Best Supporting Actress	Jennifer Jason Leigh	Nominated	
Detroit Film Critics Society Awards	December 14, 2015	Best Ensemble	The Hateful Eight	Nominated	
Detroit Film Critics Society Awards	December 14, 2015	Best Screenplay	Quentin Tarantino	Nominated	
Empire Awards	March 20, 2016	Best Film	The Hateful Eight	Nominated	
Empire Awards	March 20, 2016	Best Screenplay	Quentin Tarantino	Nominated	
Empire Awards	March 20, 2016	Best Soundtrack	The Hateful Eight	Nominated	
Florida Film Critics Circle Awards	December 23, 2015	Best Supporting Actress	Jennifer Jason Leigh	Nominated	
Florida Film Critics Circle Awards	December 23, 2015	Best Screenplay	Quentin Tarantino	Nominated	
Florida Film Critics Circle Awards	December 23, 2015	Best Score	Ennio Morricone	Nominated	
Georgia Film Critics Association Awards	January 8, 2016	Best Supporting Actress	Jennifer Jason Leigh	Nominated	
Georgia Film Critics Association Awards	January 8, 2016	Best Original Score	Ennio Morricone	Won	
Golden Globe Awards	January 10, 2016	Best Supporting Actress – Motion Picture	Jennifer Jason Leigh	Nominated	
Golden Globe Awards	January 10, 2016	Best Screenplay	Quentin Tarantino	Nominated	
Golden Globe Awards	January 10, 2016	Best Original Score	Ennio Morricone	Won	
Golden Trailer Awards	May 4, 2016	Best Independent TV Spot	The Hateful Eight (for "Last Shot")	Won	
Golden Trailer Awards	May 4, 2016	Best Action Poster	The Hateful Eight	Nominated	
Golden Trailer Awards	May 4, 2016	Best Drama Poster	The Hateful Eight	Won	
Golden Trailer Awards	May 4, 2016	Best Wildposts (Teaser Campaign)	The Hateful Eight	Nominated	
Golden Trailer Awards	June 29, 2023	Best Original Score TV Spot (for a Feature Film)	The Hateful Eight	Nominated	
Golden Trailer Awards	June 29, 2023	Best Sound Editing in a TV Spot (for a Feature Film)	The Hateful Eight	Nominated	
Grammy Awards	February 12, 2017	Best Score Soundtrack for Visual Media	Ennio Morricone	Nominated	
Grammy Awards	February 12, 2017	Best Instrumental Composition	Ennio Morricone (for "L'Ultima Diligenza Di Red Rock – Versione Integrale")	Nominated	
Hollywood Film Awards	November 1, 2015	Ensemble of the Year	The Hateful Eight	Won	
Houston Film Critics Society Awards	January 9, 2016	Best Supporting Actress	Jennifer Jason Leigh	Nominated	
Houston Film Critics Society Awards	January 9, 2016	Best Screenplay	Quentin Tarantino	Nominated	
Houston Film Critics Society Awards	January 9, 2016	Best Cinematography	Robert Richardson	Nominated	
Houston Film Critics Society Awards	January 9, 2016	Best Score	Ennio Morricone	Won	
International Cinephile Society Awards	February 21, 2016	Best Actor	Samuel L. Jackson	Nominated	
International Cinephile Society Awards	February 21, 2016	Best Supporting Actor	Walton Goggins	2nd place	
International Cinephile Society Awards	February 21, 2016	Best Supporting Actress	Jennifer Jason Leigh	Nominated	
International Cinephile Society Awards	February 21, 2016	Best Ensemble	The Hateful Eight	Nominated	
International Cinephile Society Awards	February 21, 2016	Best Original Score	Ennio Morricone	Nominated	
National Board of Review	December 1, 2015	Top Ten Films	The Hateful Eight	Won	
National Board of Review	December 1, 2015	Best Supporting Actress	Jennifer Jason Leigh	Won	
National Board of Review	December 1, 2015	Best Original Screenplay	Quentin Tarantino	Won	
San Diego Film Critics Society Awards	December 14, 2015	Best Supporting Actress	Jennifer Jason Leigh	Won	
San Diego Film Critics Society Awards	December 14, 2015	Best Ensemble	The Hateful Eight	Nominated	
San Diego Film Critics Society Awards	December 14, 2015	Best Original Screenplay	Quentin Tarantino	Nominated	
San Diego Film Critics Society Awards	December 14, 2015	Best Use of Music in a Film	The Hateful Eight	Won	
Saturn Awards	June 22, 2016	Best Thriller Film	The Hateful Eight	Nominated	
Saturn Awards	June 22, 2016	Best Actor	Samuel L. Jackson	Nominated	
Saturn Awards	June 22, 2016	Best Supporting Actor	Walton Goggins	Nominated	
Saturn Awards	June 22, 2016	Best Music	Ennio Morricone	Nominated	
Saturn Awards	June 22, 2016	Best Make-up	Greg Nicotero, Howard Berger, and Heba Thorisdottir	Nominated	
St. Louis Film Critics Association Awards	December 21, 2015	Best Supporting Actress	Jennifer Jason Leigh	Nominated	
St. Louis Film Critics Association Awards	December 21, 2015	Best Original Screenplay	Quentin Tarantino	Nominated	
St. Louis Film Critics Association Awards	December 21, 2015	Best Cinematography	Robert Richardson	Nominated	
St. Louis Film Critics Association Awards	December 21, 2015	Best Score	Ennio Morricone	Won	
Vancouver Film Critics Circle	December 21, 2015	Best Supporting Actress	Jennifer Jason Leigh	Nominated	
Village Voice Film Poll	December 15, 2015	Best Supporting Actress	Jennifer Jason Leigh	Nominated	
Washington D.C. Area Film Critics Association Awards	December 7, 2015	Best Supporting Actress	Jennifer Jason Leigh	Nominated	
Washington D.C. Area Film Critics Association Awards	December 7, 2015	Best Ensemble	The Hateful Eight	Nominated	
Washington D.C. Area Film Critics Association Awards	December 7, 2015	Best Score	Ennio Morricone	Nominated	
