= Stranger than Fiction (2006 film) =

- Theatrical release poster
- Directed by: Marc Forster
- Written by: Zach Helm
- Produced by: Lindsay Doran
- Starring: Will Ferrell; Maggie Gyllenhaal; Dustin Hoffman; Queen Latifah; Emma Thompson
- Cinematography: Roberto Schaefer
- Edited by: Matt Chessé
- Music by: Britt Daniel; Brian Reitzell
- Production companies: Mandate Pictures; Three Strange Angels
- Distributed by: Columbia Pictures (North America and select international territories; through Sony Pictures Releasing); Mandate International (International)
- Release date: November 10, 2006
- Running time: 114 minutes
- Countries: United States; United Kingdom
- Language: English
- Budget: $30 million
- Box office: $53.7 million

Stranger than Fiction is a 2006 fantasy romance comedy drama film directed by Marc Forster, produced by Lindsay Doran and written by Zach Helm. The film stars Will Ferrell, Maggie Gyllenhaal, Dustin Hoffman, Queen Latifah and Emma Thompson. The main plot follows Harold Crick (Ferrell), an IRS agent who begins hearing a disembodied voice narrating his life as it happens – seemingly the text of a novel in which it is stated that he, the main character, will soon die – and he frantically seeks to somehow prevent his death.

Stranger than Fiction was released by Sony Pictures Releasing under its Columbia Pictures label on November 10, 2006. Upon its release, the film received positive reviews.

== Plot ==
Harold Crick is an Internal Revenue Service (IRS) agent living a solitary life of strictly scheduled routine in Chicago. On the day he is assigned to audit an intentionally tax-delinquent baker named Ana Pascal, Harold begins hearing the voice of a woman narrating his life. When his wristwatch stops working and he resets it using the time from a bystander, the voice narrates that this action will eventually result in Harold's death.

Harold consults a psychiatrist, who suggests he see a literary expert if he believes there is a narrator. He visits literature professor Jules Hilbert, who initially dismisses him. However, he recognizes omniscient narrative devices in what Harold claims the voice said, and is intrigued. He tries to help Harold identify the author, and determine if his story is a comedy or tragedy.

As Harold audits Ana, he develops an attraction to her, but when he obliviously rejects a gift of cookies because it could be considered a bribe, he takes it as a sign that he is in a tragedy. Jules tells Harold to spend the day at home doing nothing, and his living room is destroyed by a demolition crew that went to the wrong building. Jules takes such an improbable occurrence as proof that Harold is no longer in control of his own life, and advises he enjoy the time he has left, accepting whatever destiny the narrator has for him.

Harold takes time off from work, learns to play guitar, moves in with his co-worker Dave, and starts dating Ana. When she begins to fall in love with him, he reevaluates his story as a comedy. While meeting with Jules, Harold sees a television interview with author Karen Eiffel, and recognizes her voice as his narrator's. Jules, an admirer of Karen's work, says that all of her books are tragedies: the protagonist always dies. Karen has been struggling with writer's block on her next book because she cannot figure out how to kill Harold Crick, but has had a breakthrough and has begun writing again.

Harold telephones Karen and stuns her by accurately recounting her book to her. They meet in person, and she explains she has outlined the conclusion, but has not yet typed it in full. Her assistant, Penny, recommends that Harold read the outline, but he cannot bring himself to do so, and gives it to Jules. Jules deems it Karen's masterpiece to which Harold's death is integral, and he consoles Harold that death is inevitable, but this death will hold a deeper meaning.

Harold reads the outline and returns it to Karen, telling her the death she has written for him is beautiful and he accepts it. He takes care of some errands, and spends his last night with Ana. The next morning, Harold goes about his routine again, as Karen writes and narrates.

Karen reveals that when Harold reset his wristwatch, the bystander's time was three minutes fast, so he reaches the bus stop early that morning. A boy riding a bicycle falls in front of the bus; Harold runs into the street to save him, and is hit himself. However, Karen, traumatized by the idea that she unwittingly narrated real people to their deaths, cannot bring herself to finish the sentence declaring him dead. She meets Jules and offers him a revised ending.

Harold, heavily injured, wakes up in a hospital, and learns that shrapnel from his wristwatch — which was destroyed in the collision — blocked his ulnar artery and saved him from bleeding to death. Jules thinks this new ending weakens the book. Karen replies that the book was about a man who did not know he was going to die, but if Harold knew and accepted his fate, he is the kind of person who deserves to live. Karen's narration closes the film over a montage of Harold's newly invigorated life, ending on the ruined wristwatch that saved his life.

== Cast ==
- Will Ferrell as Harold Crick, an IRS agent who starts hearing Eiffel's voice narrating his life
- Maggie Gyllenhaal as Ana Pascal, a baker who is being audited by Crick and begins to fall in love with him
- Dustin Hoffman as Professor Jules Hilbert, a literature expert advising Crick
- Queen Latifah as Penny Escher, an assistant who helps authors finish their works
- Emma Thompson as Karen Eiffel, an author known for killing the protagonists in her novels; she has been suffering from writer's block
- Tony Hale as Dave, Crick's friend from his work
- Tom Hulce as Dr. Cayly
- Linda Hunt as Dr. Mittag-Leffler, a psychologist whom Crick sees in hopes of solving his narration problem
- Kristin Chenoweth as Book Channel Host

== Production ==
=== Writing ===
In 2001, writer Zach Helm was working with producer Lindsay Doran on a project they called "The Disassociate". Helm came to Doran with a new idea involving a man who finds himself accompanied by a narrator only he can hear. Helm decided that the narrator should state that the man is going to die, because, as Helm described, "There's something very poetic about the understanding of one's place in the universe, but it's far more dramatic when such understanding occurs only days before that life ends." Helm and Doran began referring to the new project as "The Narrator Project", and developed the story through a process of Helm's ideas and Doran's questions. One of Helm's main ideas involved engaging the movie's form as much as its content.

Helm named each of the film's chief characters after a famous scientist or scientifically influential artist, including Crick, Pascal, Eiffel, Escher and David Hilbert. When the character of Dr. Hilbert tells Harold that he has devised a series of 23 questions to investigate the narrator, it is a playful reference to Hilbert's 23 problems. The film's title derives from a quote by Lord Byron: "Tis strange — but true; for truth is always strange, stranger than fiction."

According to Helm, one of the film's major themes is of interconnectivity. Helm stated, "Each of these characters ends up doing little things to save one another. There's an underlying theme that the things we take most for granted are often the ones that make life worth living and actually keep us alive."

=== Principal photography ===
The film was shot on location in Chicago, Illinois from April 25 to July 20, 2005. Dave's apartment, in which Harold takes residence after his own building is partially demolished, is part of the River City Condominiums. Hilbert's office was in a lecture hall at the University of Illinois Chicago. The CNA Center at 333 South Wabash Avenue, in the Loop, served as the location of the IRS office. The bakery that Ana Pascal runs is located in the Little Village neighborhood of Chicago, and is called La Catedral Cafe & Restaurant. The movie theater in the film is the Logan Theatre, located in the Logan Square neighborhood. Many downtown Chicago locations were used for scenes involving Karen Eiffel, Penny Escher and Harold Crick.

The film partly was inspired by Playtime, Jacques Tati's visionary comedy about modern urban life, and the cinematography and production designs help create a claustrophobic sense of life in the city.

=== Music ===
The music for Stranger than Fiction includes original scores by the collaborative effort of Britt Daniel (singer-songwriter of Spoon) and Brian Reitzell (composer for Friday Night Lights, The Bling Ring and Hannibal), as well as a mix of indie rock songs from various artists, including Spoon. Reitzell is also the film's music supervisor. The soundtrack includes an original recording of "Whole Wide World", the song Harold plays for Ana, by Wreckless Eric.

== Release ==
Stranger than Fiction was given a wide release, in 2,264 screens, on November 10, 2006. It opened at No. 4, its first of four consecutive weeks in the Top 10 at the domestic box office.

=== Box office ===
Stranger than Fiction grossed $40.7 million domestically and $13.0 million in other territories, for a worldwide total of $53.7 million, against a budget of $30 million.

== Reception ==
On the review aggregator website Rotten Tomatoes, 73% of 176 critics' reviews are positive, with an average rating of 6.9/10. The website's consensus reads: "A fun, whimsical tale about an office drone trying to save his life from his narrator, Stranger Than Fiction features a subdued performance from Will Ferrell that contributes mightily to its quirky, mind-bending effect." Metacritic, which uses a weighted average, assigned the film a score of 67 out of 100, based on 35 critics, indicating "generally favorable" reviews. Audiences polled by CinemaScore gave the film an average grade of "B+" on an A+ to F scale.

Roger Ebert of the Chicago Sun-Times gave the film 3.5 stars out of 4, stating that the film was thought-provoking and moral, and that "such an uncommonly intelligent film does not often get made...which requires us to enter the lives of these specific quiet, sweet, worthy people". He also praised Ferrell's performance, saying, "Will Ferrell stars, in another role showing that like Steve Martin and Robin Williams he has dramatic gifts to equal his comedic talent."

Rolling Stone rated the film 3 stars out of 4, stating that, although the premise of Ferrell's life being narrated is a set-up for farce, the film is "less self-reflexively clever and more intimate".

Todd McCarthy in Variety reviewed the film positively, praising its invention, and Ferrell's performance as nuanced; first playing a tight focused caricature of the company man, then exercising more humanity and wit without being "goofy".

=== Accolades ===
Award	Category	Nominee(s)	Result	Ref.
Alliance of Women Film Journalists	Best Comedy by or About Women	Marc Forster	Nominated	
Alliance of Women Film Journalists	Best Actress in a Comedic Performance	Emma Thompson	Nominated	
Critics' Choice Awards	Best Supporting Actress	Emma Thompson	Nominated	
Critics' Choice Awards	Best Writer	Zach Helm	Nominated	
Golden Globe Awards	Best Actor in a Motion Picture – Musical or Comedy	Will Ferrell	Nominated	
Hollywood Film Awards	Casting Director of the Year	Francine Maisler (Also for Babel and Miami Vice)	Won	
London Film Critics Circle Awards	British Supporting Actress of the Year	Emma Thompson	Nominated	
National Board of Review Awards	Best Original Screenplay	Zach Helm	Won	
PEN America Literary Awards	Best Screenplay	Zach Helm	Won	
Satellite Awards	Best Motion Picture – Musical or Comedy		Nominated	
Satellite Awards	Best Actor in a Motion Picture – Musical or Comedy	Will Ferrell	Nominated	
Saturn Awards	Best Fantasy Film		Nominated	
Saturn Awards	Best Actor	Will Ferrell	Nominated	
Saturn Awards	Best Actress	Maggie Gyllenhaal	Nominated	
Saturn Awards	Best Supporting Actress	Emma Thompson	Nominated	
Saturn Awards	Best Writing	Zach Helm	Nominated	
Utah Film Critics Association Awards	Best Supporting Actress	Maggie Gyllenhaal	Nominated	
Writers Guild of America Awards	Best Original Screenplay	Zach Helm	Nominated	

== See also ==
- Metafiction
- The Stanley Parable, a 2013 video game with similar themes.
