= Molly Burch =

American singer-songwriter (born 1990)

- Burch in 2018

Background information
- Born: October 23, 1990 (age 35)
- Origin: Los Angeles
- Genres: Indie pop, indie rock
- Years active: 2013–2025
- Label: Captured Tracks
- Partner: Dailey Toliver
- Members: Dailey Toliver
- Relatives: Samy Burch (sister)

Molly Burch (born October 23, 1990) is an American singer-songwriter. Based in Los Angeles, California, her music often reflects themes of heartbreak and loss. She is the lead vocalist and writer. Burch studied jazz vocal performance at UNC Asheville and gravitated towards vocalists such as Nina Simone and Billie Holiday. A reviewer described her music as an "intoxicating ode to an unrequited love" as from a "smoky club chanteuse".

In 2025, Burch retired from the music industry to start Picnic Studio, a nonprofit art space for adults with intellectual and developmental disabilities.

== Early life ==
Burch was raised in Los Angeles. Both her parents were involved in the film industry; her mother Jackie Burch was a casting director, and her father worked in film development. Her sister is screenwriter Samy Burch.

== Discography ==
=== Studio albums ===
List of studio albums, with selected details
Title	Details
Please Be Mine	Released: February 17, 2017; Label: Captured Tracks; Formats: Vinyl, CD, cassette, digital download, streaming
First Flower	Released: October 5, 2018; Label: Captured Tracks; Formats: Vinyl, CD, cassette, digital download, streaming
The Molly Burch Christmas Album	Released: November 15, 2019; Label: Captured Tracks; Formats: Vinyl, CD, digital download, streaming
Romantic Images	Released: July 23, 2021; Label: Captured Tracks; Formats: Vinyl, CD, cassette, digital download, streaming
The Molly Burch Christmas Album - Expanded	Released: December 5, 2022; Formats: Vinyl, digital download, streaming
Daydreamer	Released: September 29, 2023; Label: Captured Tracks; Formats: Vinyl, CD, cassette, digital download, streaming

=== Singles ===
List of singles with selected details
Title	Year	Album
"Downhearted"	2016	Please Be Mine
"Try'"	2016	Please Be Mine
"Wrong for You"	2017	Please Be Mine
"Wild"	2018	First Flower
"To the Boys"	2018	First Flower
"Candy"	2018	First Flower
"Only One"	2019	Non-album singles
"Ballads"	2019	Non-album singles
"Last Christmas ft. John Early and Kate Berlant"	2019	The Molly Burch Christmas Album
"Needy"	2020	Non-album single
"Emotion feat. Wild Nothing"	2021	Romantic Images
"Control"	2021	Romantic Images
"Heart of Gold"	2021	Romantic Images
"Cozy Christmas/December Baby"	2022	The Molly Burch Christmas Album - Expanded
"Physical"	2023	Daydreamer
"Unconditional"	2023	Daydreamer
"Tattoo"	2023	Daydreamer
