= Samy Burch =

American screenwriter

- Born: Los Angeles, California, U.S.
- Education: New York University (BFA)
- Spouse: Alex Mechanik (m. 2023)
- Relatives: Jackie Burch (mother); Molly Burch (sister)

Samy Burch is an American screenwriter. She is known for writing May December (2023), which was nominated for the Academy Award for Best Original Screenplay, and the 2026 live-action/animation hybrid film Coyote vs. Acme.

== Early life and education ==
Burch was raised in West Los Angeles and attended the Archer School for Girls. She was exposed to the film industry at an early age through her parents; her mother Jackie Burch was a casting director, while her father worked in film development. Her sister is singer Molly Burch.

In 2009, Burch graduated from the New York University Tisch School of the Arts with a bachelor's degree in Dramatic Writing.

== Career ==
Early in her career, Burch worked in casting. She also wrote and directed a series of short films with her now-husband, Alex Mechanik.

Burch completed the screenplay for May December, her first feature film, in 2019. The script was inspired by recollections of the 1990s tabloid culture of her youth, particularly the case of Mary Kay Letourneau. Director Todd Haynes first read the script in 2020 and the completed film premiered on May 20, 2023, at the 76th Cannes Film Festival.

Burch wrote the screenplay for the Warner Bros. family comedy movie Coyote vs. Acme, based on a 1990 Ian Frazier humor piece that first appeared in The New Yorker. It was shelved by Warner Bros. Discovery in November 2023, who reversed its decision a week later after public backlash, but in February 2024, it was reported that the film was expected to be deleted and claimed as a tax write-off. On March 10, 2024, Burch told IndieWire at the 96th Academy Awards that the film might still be released and conversations were still ongoing. The film was ultimately picked up for distribution by Ketchup Entertainment and released in August 2026.

In May 2024, Variety reported that Late Fame, a Kent Jones film starring Willem Dafoe with a screenplay by Burch, would begin shooting that fall in New York City.

== Personal life ==
In 2023, Burch married Alex Mechanik, with whom she developed the story for May December. The pair met while studying film at NYU and currently reside in Los Angeles.

== Filmography ==
Short film

Year	Title	Director	Writer	Producer	Editor	Notes
2012	Lampshade Susan	Yes	No	No	Yes	Co-directed with Alex Mechanik
2012	The Rock Collection	Yes	No	No	Yes	Co-directed with Alex Mechanik
2012	Family Dinner	Yes	No	No	Yes	Co-directed with Alex Mechanik
2013	All You Can Eat	Yes	Yes	Yes	Yes	Co-directed with Alex Mechanik
2013	Housewife Sonata	Yes	No	No	Yes	Co-directed with Alex Mechanik
2016	Bev	Yes	Yes	Yes	Yes	Co-directed with Alex Mechanik
2017	Crown Prince	Yes	Yes	Yes	No	Co-directed with Alex Mechanik

Feature film

Year	Title	Writer	Executive Producer
2023	May December	Yes	Yes
2025	Late Fame	Yes	Yes
2026	Coyote vs. Acme	Yes	No

== Awards and nominations ==
Year	Award	Category	Nominated work	Result	Ref.
2023	New York Film Critics Circle	Best Screenplay	May December	Won	
2023	Gotham Awards	Best Screenplay	May December	Nominated	
2023	Boston Society of Film Critics	Best Screenplay	May December	Runner-up (Note: Tied with Nicole Holofcener for You Hurt My Feelings.)	
2023	Los Angeles Film Critics Association	Best Screenplay	May December	Runner-up	
2023	Chicago Film Critics Association	Best Original Screenplay	May December	Won	
2023	Las Vegas Film Critics Society	Best Original Screenplay	May December	Nominated	
2023	Boston Online Film Critics Association	Best Screenplay	May December	Won (Note: Tied with David Hemingson for The Holdovers.)	
2023	Indiana Film Journalists Association	Best Original Screenplay	May December	Runner-up (Note: Shared with cowriter Alex Mechanik.)	
2023	San Diego Film Critics Society	Best Original Screenplay	May December	Nominated	
2023	Online Association of Female Film Critics	Best Original Screenplay	May December	Runner-up	
2024	Alliance of Women Film Journalists	Best Original Screenplay	May December	Nominated	
2024	Alliance of Women Film Journalists	Best Female Screenwriter	May December	Nominated	
2024	Columbus Film Critics Association	Best Original Screenplay	May December	Nominated	
2024	Georgia Film Critics Association	Best Original Screenplay	May December	Nominated	
2024	North Carolina Film Critics Association	Best Original Screenplay	May December	Nominated	
2024	DiscussingFilm Critic Awards	Best Original Screenplay	May December	Won	
2024	Greater Western New York Film Critics Association	Best Original Screenplay	May December	Nominated	
2024	National Society of Film Critics	Best Screenplay	May December	Won	
2024	Utah Film Critics Association	Best Original Screenplay	May December	Nominated	
2024	Seattle Film Critics Society	Best Screenplay	May December	Nominated	
2024	San Francisco Bay Area Film Critics Circle	Best Original Screenplay	May December	Nominated	
2024	Austin Film Critics Association	Best Original Screenplay	May December	Nominated	
2024	Denver Film Critics Society	Best Original Screenplay	May December	Nominated	
2024	Critics' Choice Awards	Best Original Screenplay	May December	Nominated	
2024	North Dakota Film Society	Best Screenplay	May December	Nominated	
2024	Portland Critics Association	Best Screenplay	May December	Nominated	
2024	Satellite Awards	Best Original Screenplay	May December	Nominated	
2024	Independent Spirit Awards	Best First Screenplay	May December	Won	
2024	Academy Awards	Best Original Screenplay	May December	Nominated	
2024	Writers Guild of America Awards	Best Original Screenplay	May December	Nominated	
