= Alex Mechanik =

American filmmaker (born 1986)

- Born: October 18, 1986 (age 39); Tampa, Florida
- Occupation: Filmmaker
- Spouse: Samy Burch (m. 2023)

Alex Mechanik (born October 18, 1986) is an American filmmaker. For his work on the Todd Haynes drama May December, he was nominated alongside his wife Samy Burch at the 96th Academy Awards.

== Early life ==
Mechanik was raised in Tampa, Florida. He graduated with a bachelor's degree from New York University Tisch School of the Arts in 2009.

== Career ==
After graduating from college, Mechanik worked as a production assistant on reality television programs such as The Apprentice. He served on the casting department for features such as Allegiant and Ant-Man, where he is credited as Woody Mechanik.

Mechanik collaborated on a series of short films with his partner, Samy Burch. The pair later collaborated on the screenplay for May December, a 2023 feature directed by Todd Haynes and starring Natalie Portman and Julianne Moore. Mechanik is also an editor for the "Open Door" video series produced by Architectural Digest.

As of early 2024, Mechanik is set to direct a feature film starring O-Lan Jones for Gloria Sanchez Productions, the company that produced May December, based on a script he developed with Burch.

== Personal life ==
While studying at New York University, Mechanik met Samy Burch, with whom he would collaborate on a number of short films as well as the story for May December. The pair married in 2023.

== Filmography ==
=== Film ===
Year	Title	Editor	Writer	Notes
2013	All You Can Eat	Yes	Yes	Short film; Co-directed with Samy Burch
2016	Bev	Yes	No	Short film; Co-directed with Samy Burch
2017	Crown Prince	Yes	Yes	Short film; Co-directed with Samy Burch
2023	May December	No	Yes	Shares "Story by" credit with Samy Burch

=== Television ===
Year	Title	Notes
2019 – 2020	Gourmet Makes	Editor, 2 episodes
2020 – 2024	Architectural Digest	Editor, 24 episodes
2024	Almost Already Famous	Editor, TV movie

== Awards and nominations ==
Year	Award	Category	Nominated work	Result	Ref.
2014	Slamdance Film Festival	Spirit of Slamdance Award	The Greggs	Won (Note: Shared with Brooke Bundy, Nigel DeFriez, Robert Malone, Kira Pearson, Jessie Levandov, and Jonathan Rosenblit)	
2014	Slamdance Film Festival	Best Narrative Short	The Greggs	Nominated	
2023	Indiana Film Journalists Association	Best Original Screenplay	May December	Runner-up (Note: Shared with cowriter Samy Burch)	
2023	Florida Film Critics Circle	Best Original Screenplay	May December	Nominated	
2023	Florida Film Critics Circle	Golden Orange	May December	Runner-up	
2024	Columbus Film Critics Association	Best Original Screenplay	May December	Nominated	
2024	Online Association of Female Film Critics	Best Original Screenplay	May December	Runner-up	
2024	Austin Film Critics Association	Best Original Screenplay	May December	Nominated	
2024	North Dakota Film Society	Best Screenplay	May December	Nominated	
2024	Portland Critics Association	Best Screenplay	May December	Nominated	
2024	Independent Spirit Awards	Best First Screenplay	May December	Won	
2024	Academy Awards	Best Original Screenplay	May December	Nominated	
2024	Writers Guild of America Awards	Best Original Screenplay	May December	Nominated	
