= Critics' Choice Movie Award for Best Original Screenplay =

Award given by the Critics Choice Association

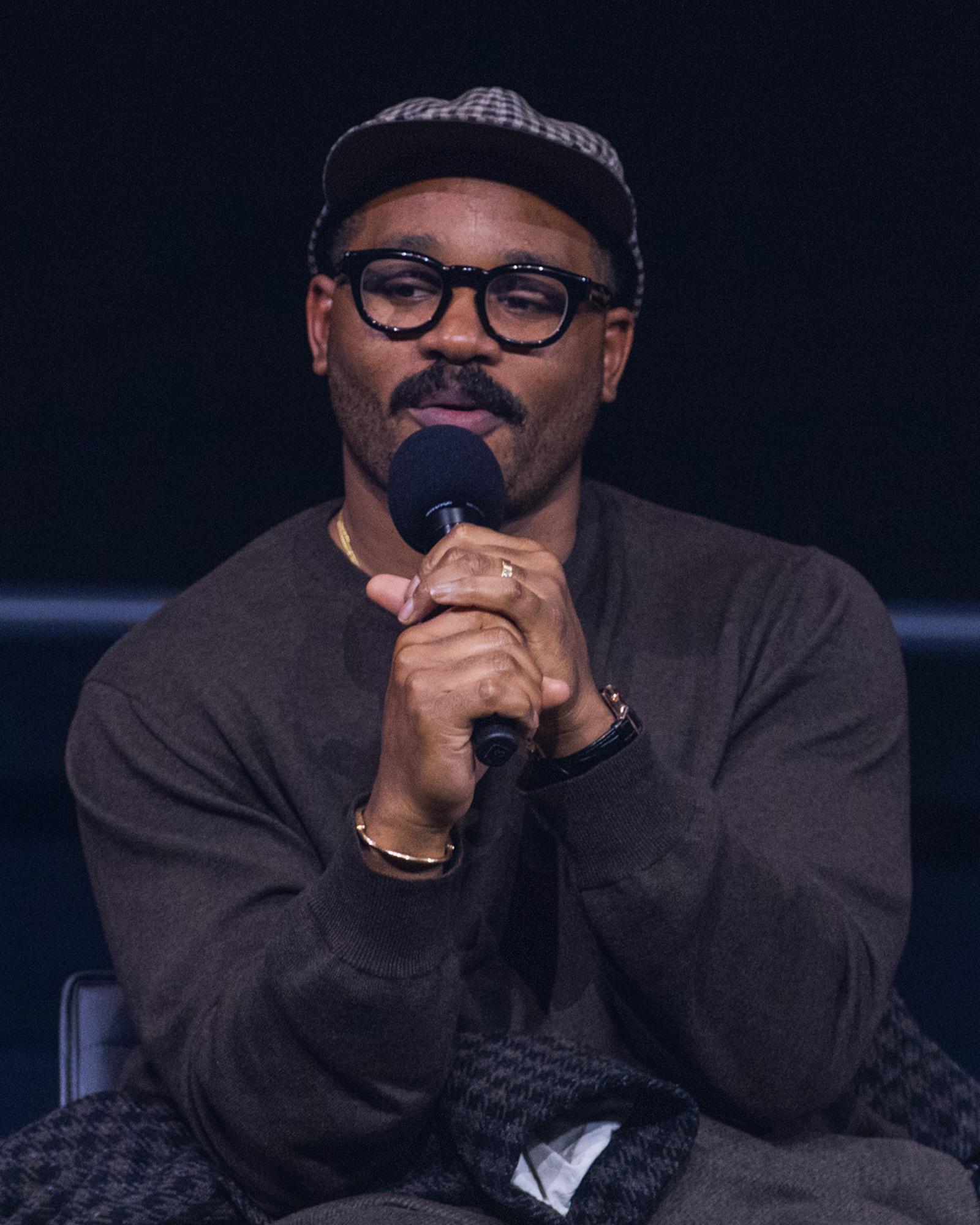
- 2025 recipient: Ryan Coogler
- Awarded for: Best Original Screenwriting of a Motion Picture
- Location: Los Angeles, California
- Presented by: Critics Choice Association
- First award: Emma Thompson for Sense and Sensibility (1995)
- Currently held by: Ryan Coogler for Sinners (2025)
- Website: www.criticschoice.com

The Critics' Choice Movie Award for Best Original Screenplay is presented by the Critics Choice Association at the annual Critics' Choice Movie Awards.

== History ==
The categories for screenplays have gone through several changes since their inception in 1995:

- From 1995 to 1996, the category Best Screenplay was presented, with no official nominees being announced but instead only a winner.
- From 1997 to 2000, the category was split into two, divided into Best Original Screenplay and Best Screenplay Adaptation.
- In 2001, the categories were merged into Best Screenplay again. From 2002 to 2008, the category was renamed to Best Writer.

In 2009, the distinction between original and adapted was implemented again, with two categories presented ever since, Best Original Screenplay and Best Adapted Screenplay.

== Winners and nominees ==
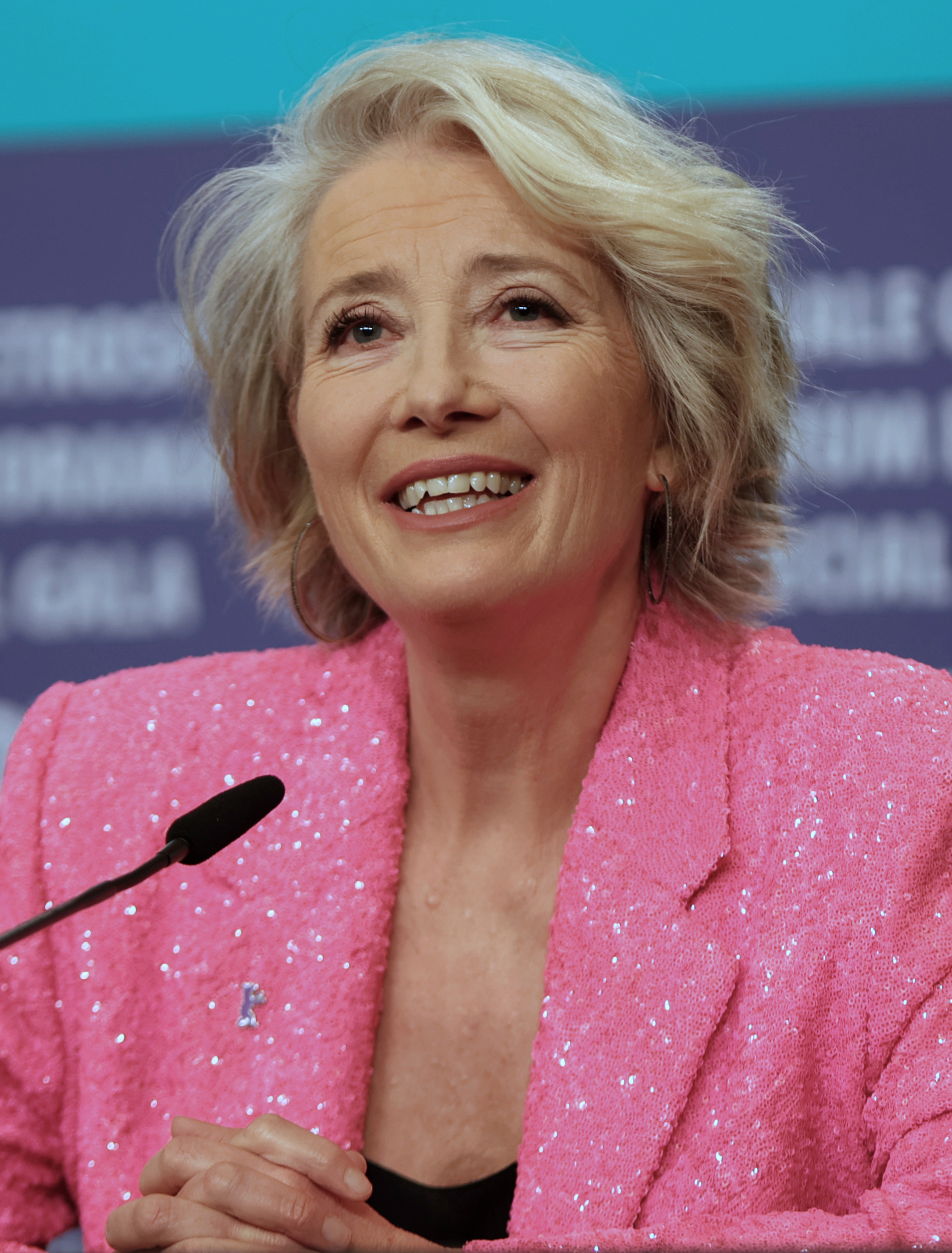
Emma Thompson was the first recipient of this award originally titled, Best Screenplay in 1995

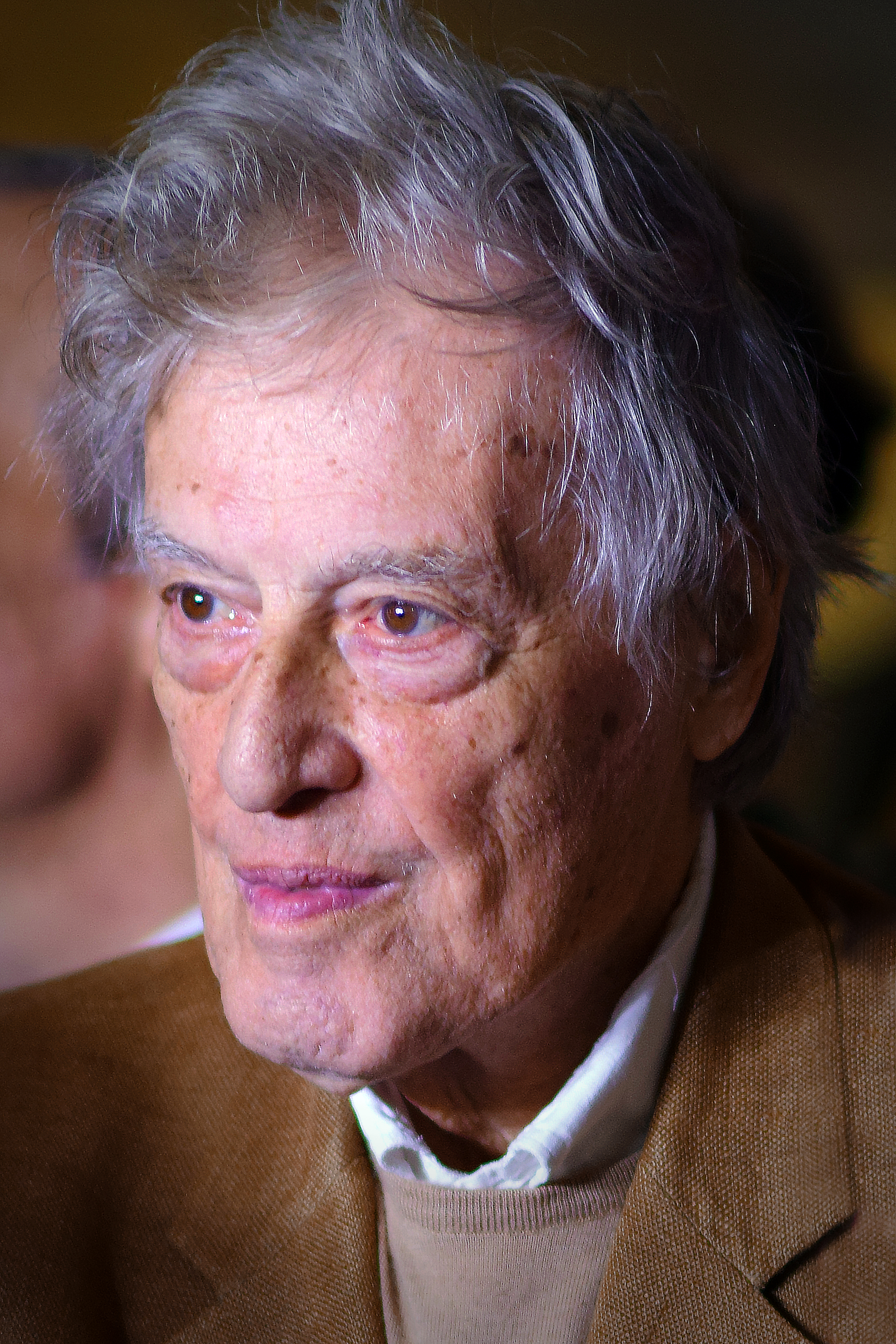
Tom Stoppard won for Shakespeare in Love (1998)

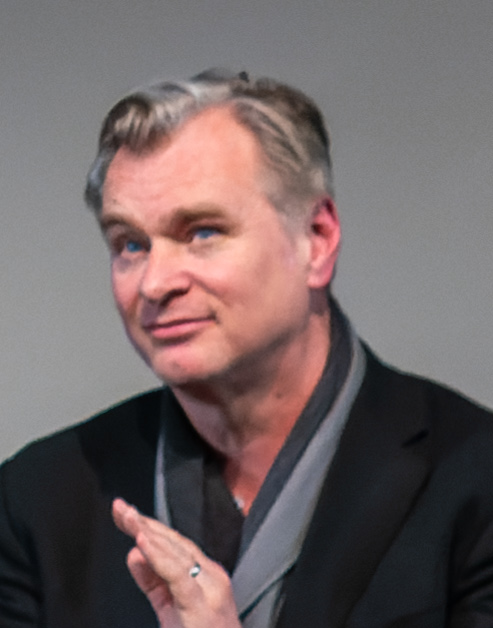
Christopher Nolan won for Memento (1999)

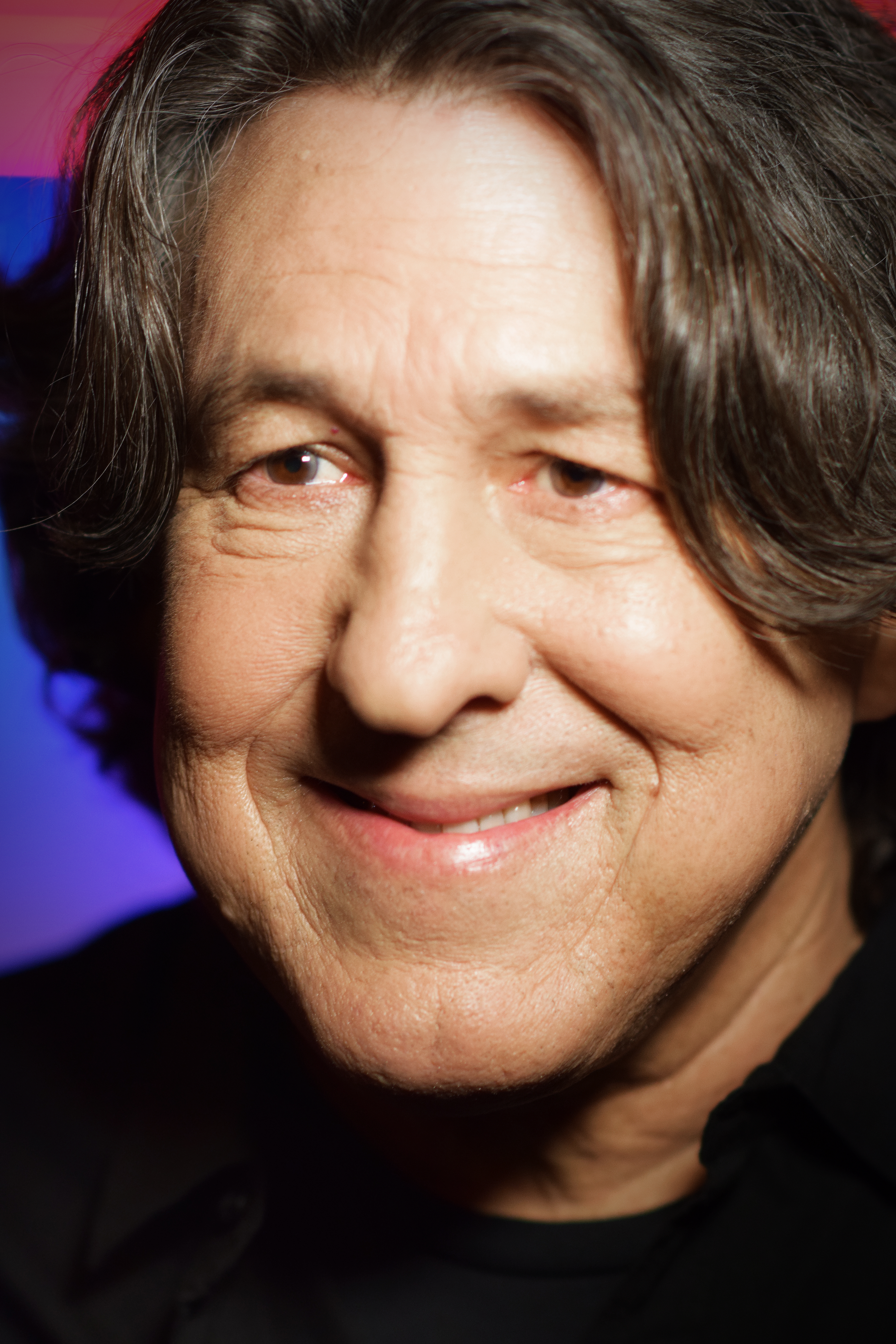
Cameron Crowe won for Almost Famous (2000)

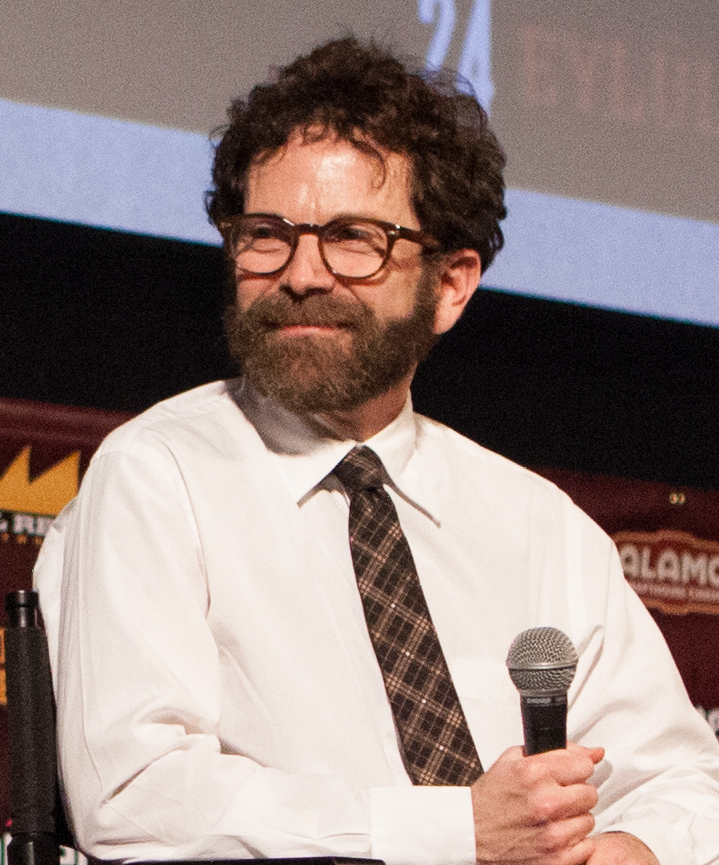
Charlie Kaufman won for Adaptation (2002)

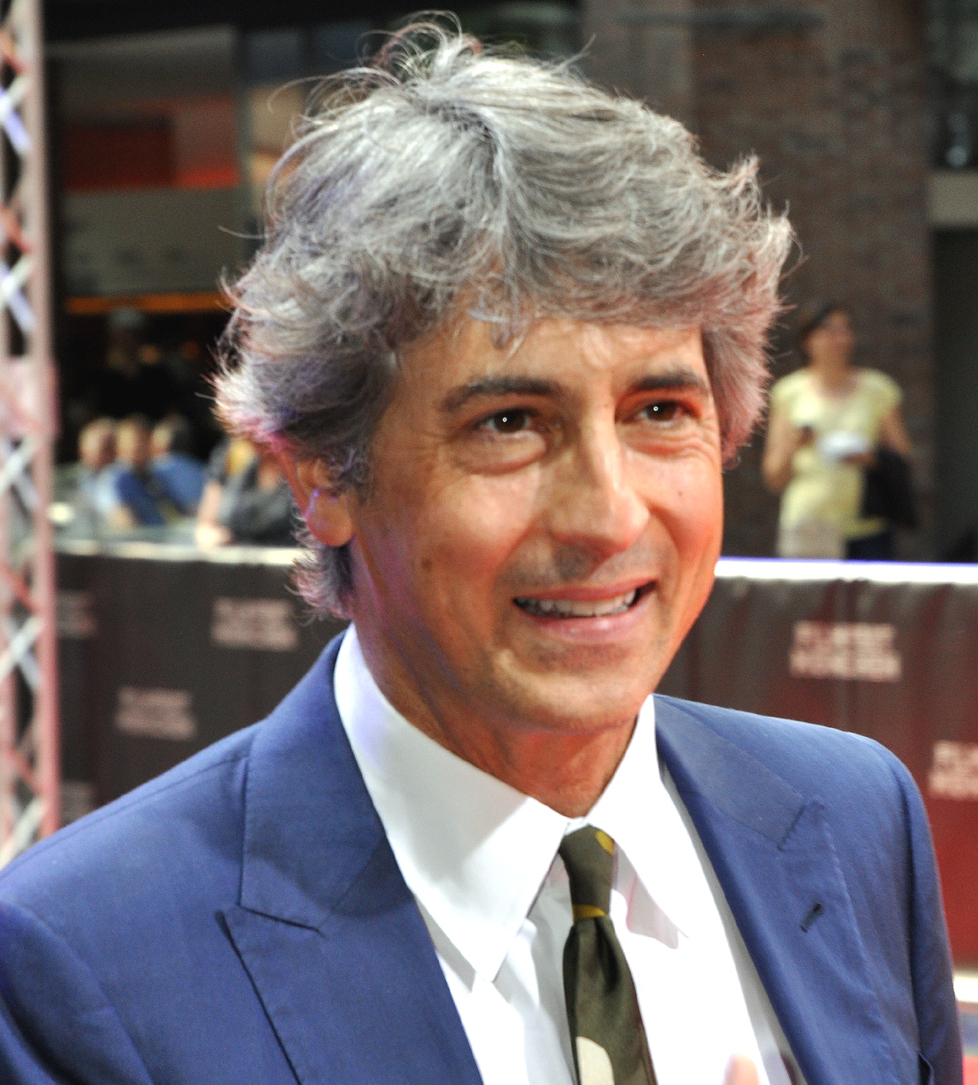
Alexander Payne won for Sideways (2004)

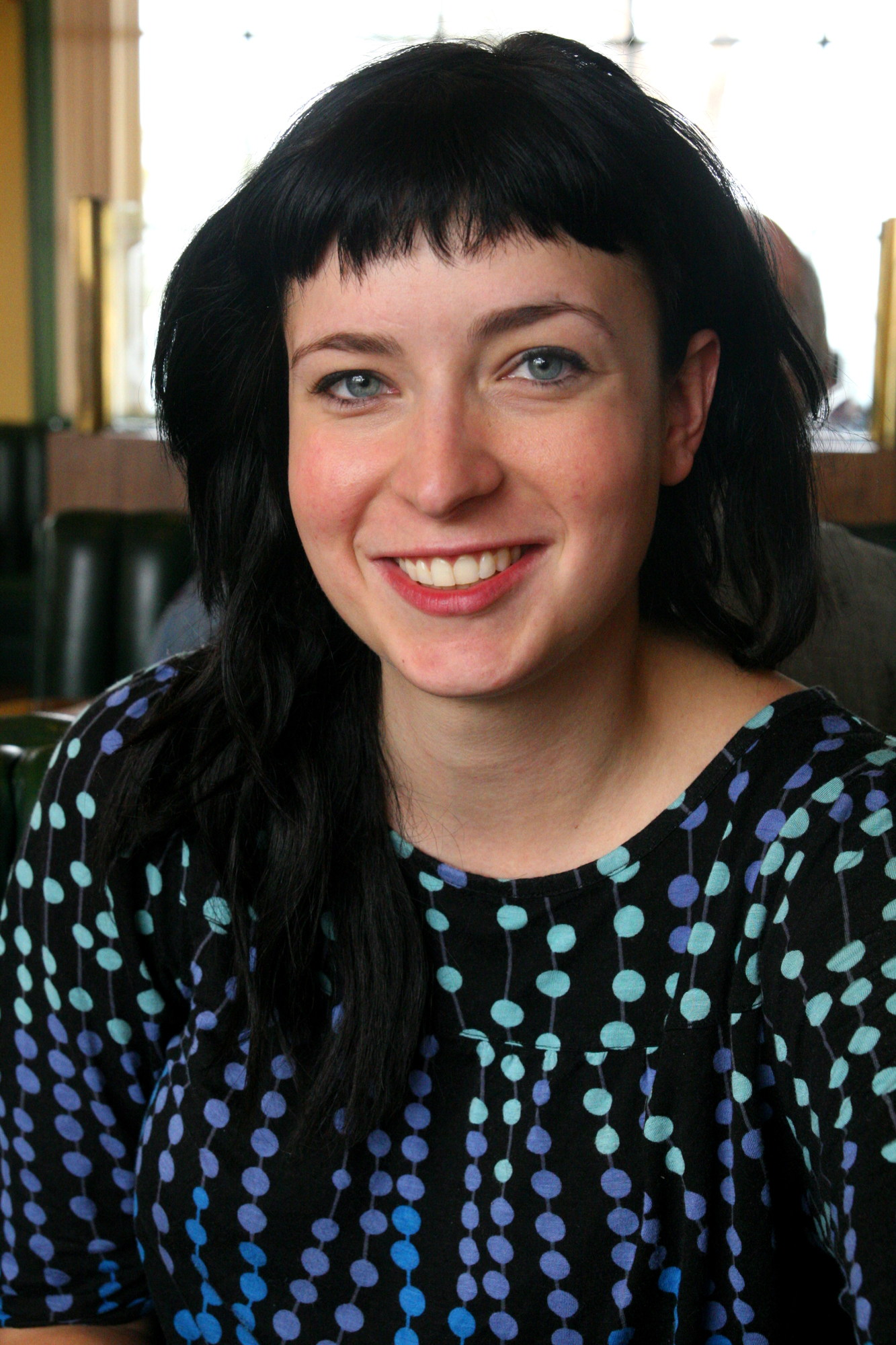
Diablo Cody won for Juno (2007)

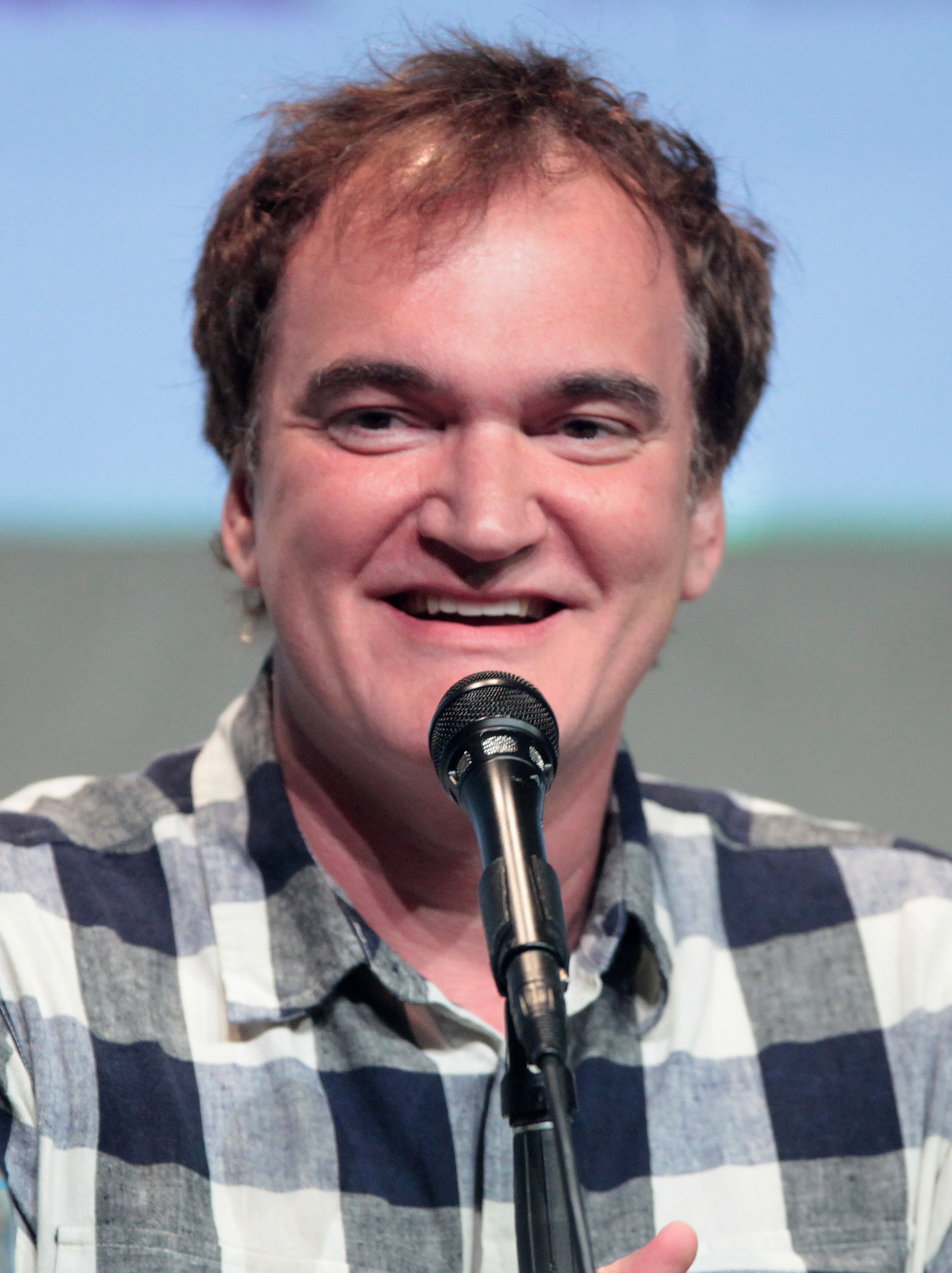
Quentin Tarantino won twice for Inglorious Basterds (2009) and Django Unchained (2012)

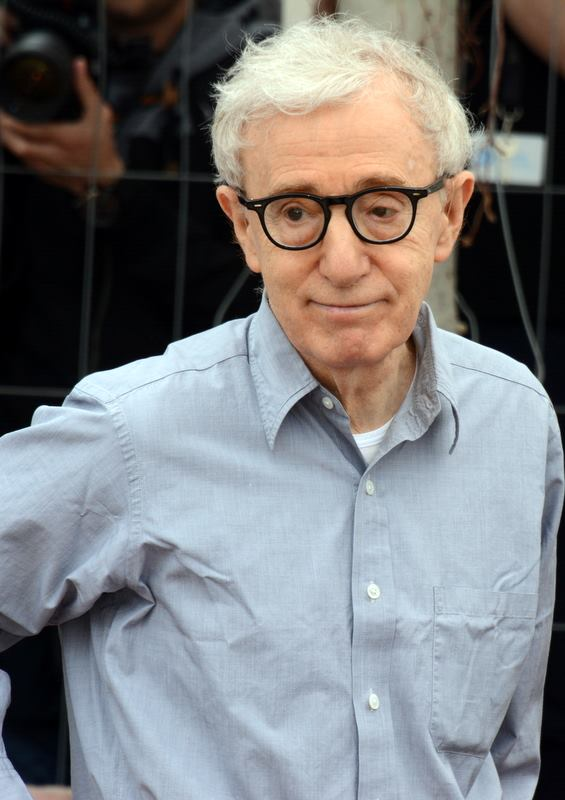
Woody Allen won for Midnight in Paris (2011)

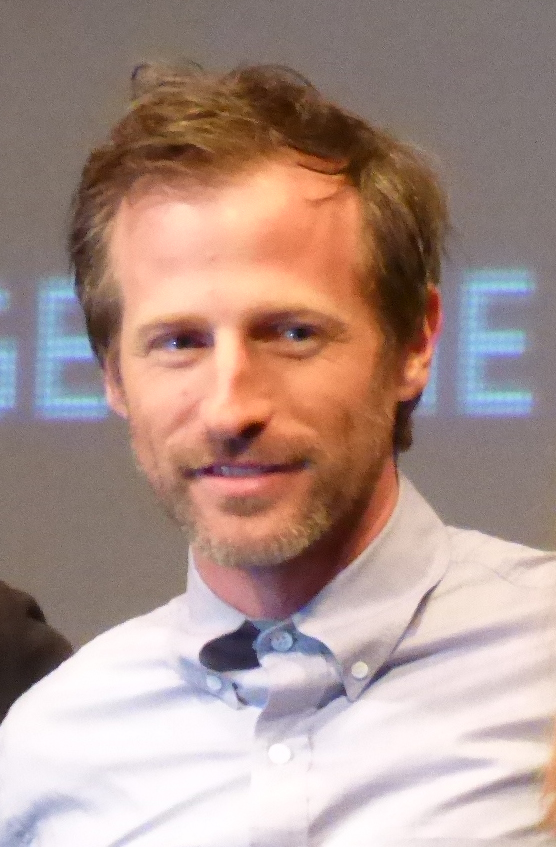
Spike Jonze won for Her (2013)

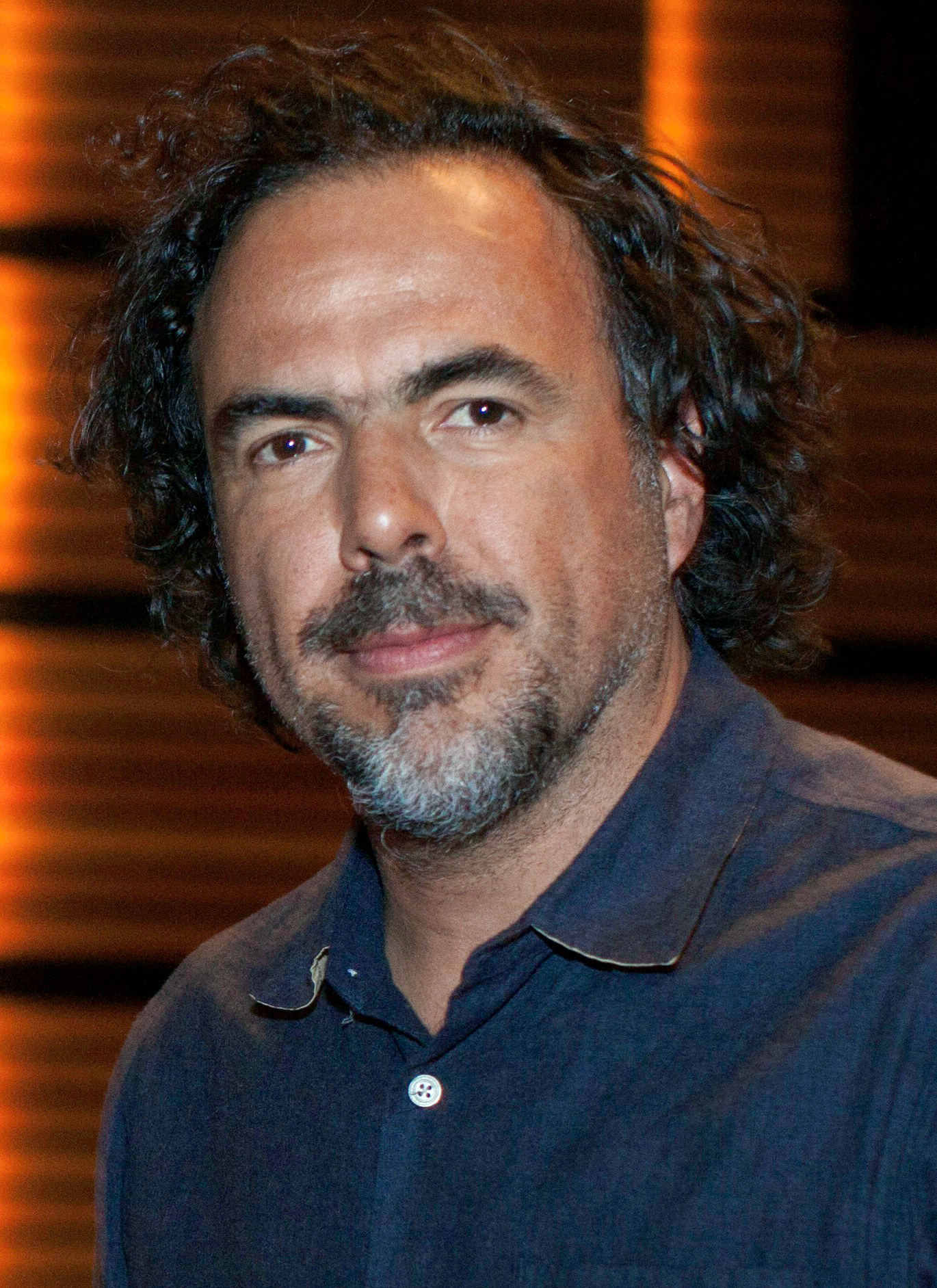
Alejandro González Iñárritu won for Birdman (2014)

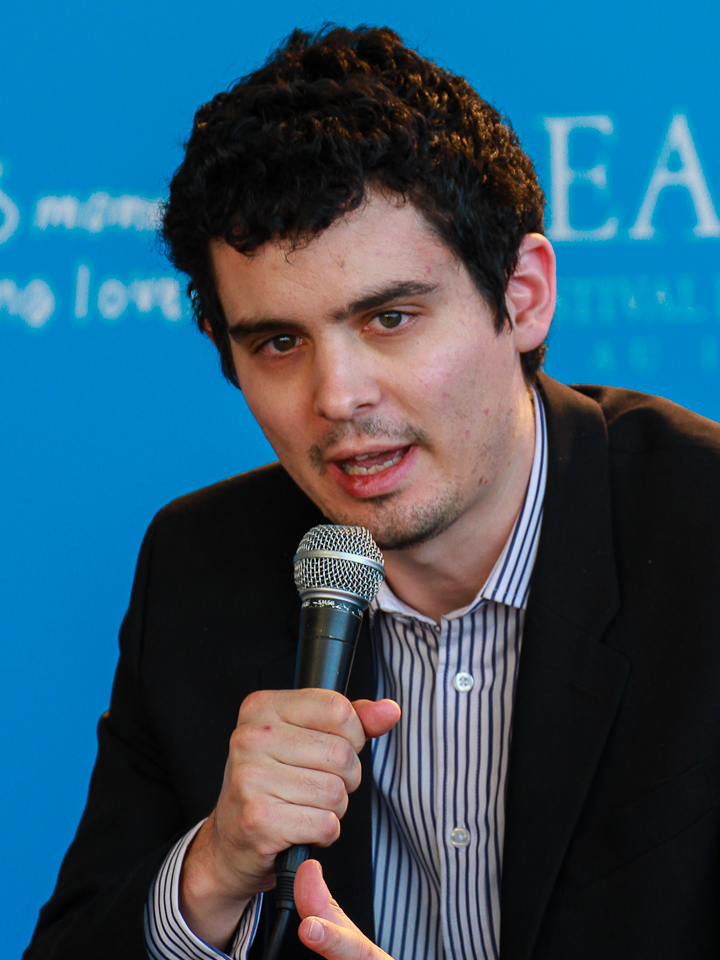
Damien Chazelle won for La La Land (2016)

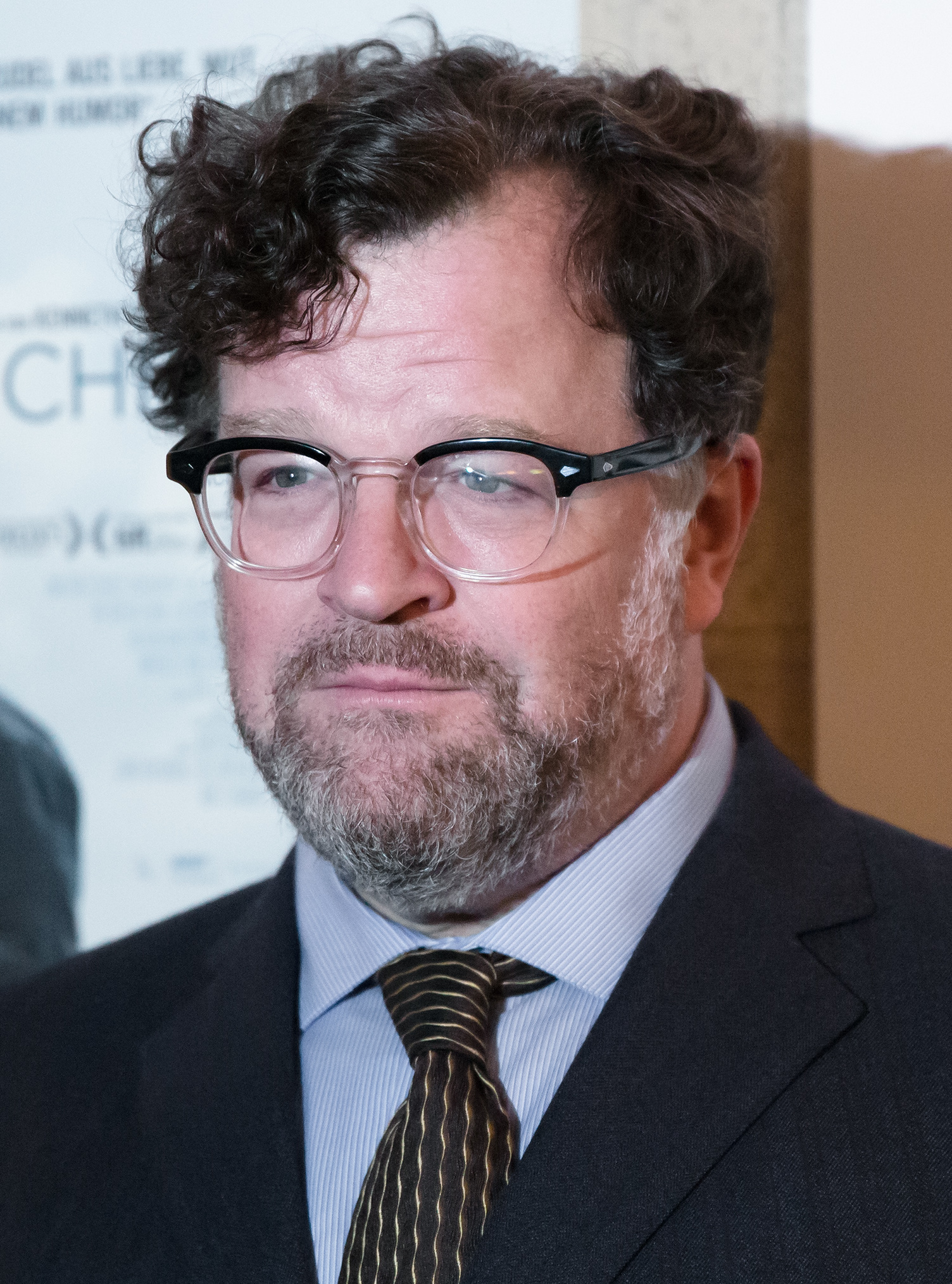
Kenneth Lonergan won for Manchester by the Sea (2016)

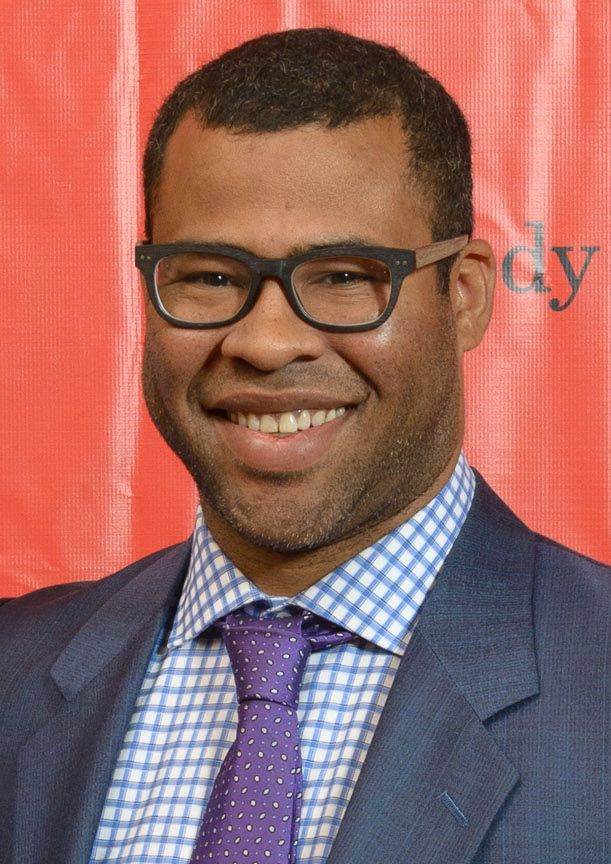
Jordan Peele won for Get Out (2017)

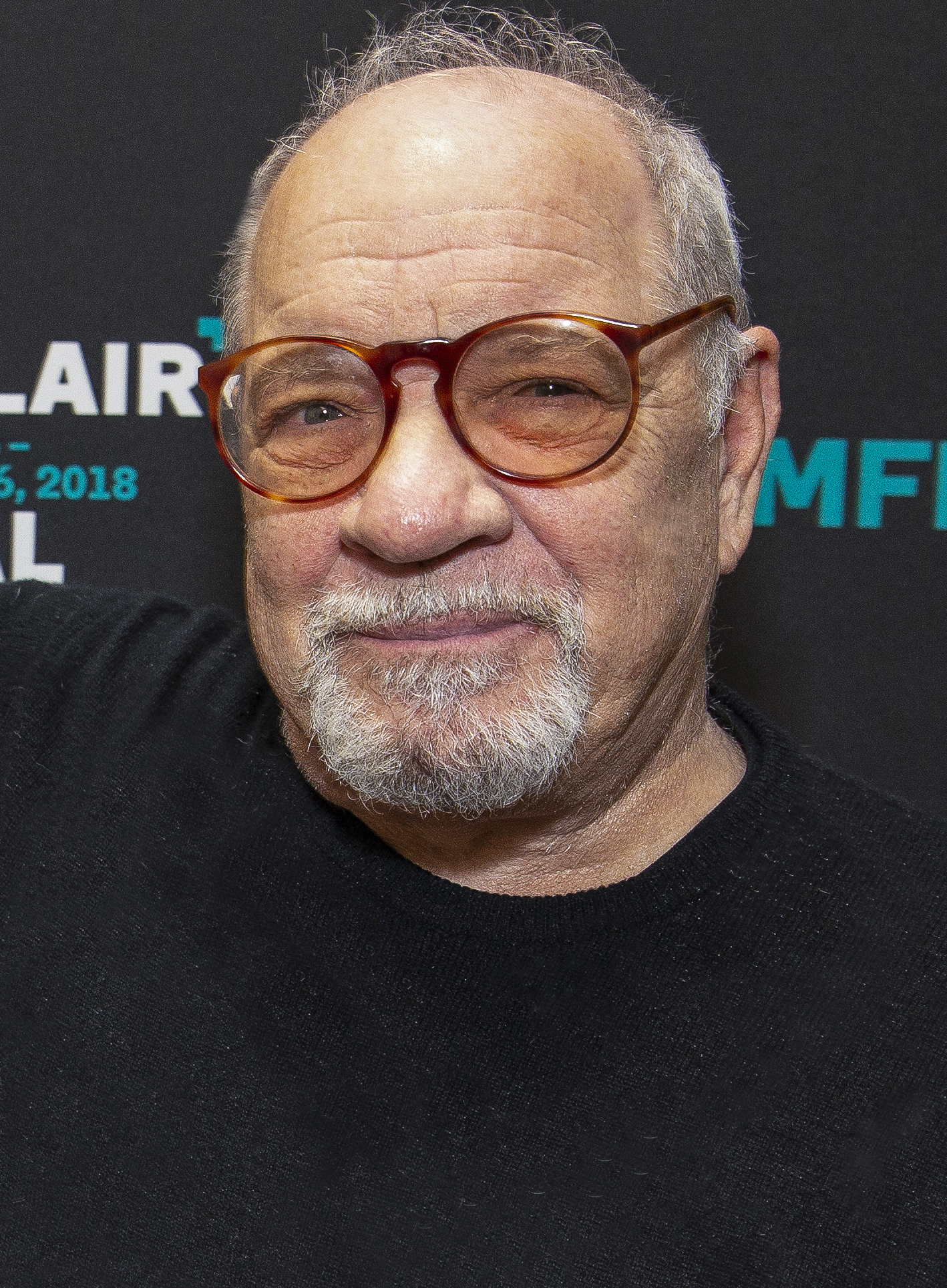
Paul Schrader won for First Reformed (2018)

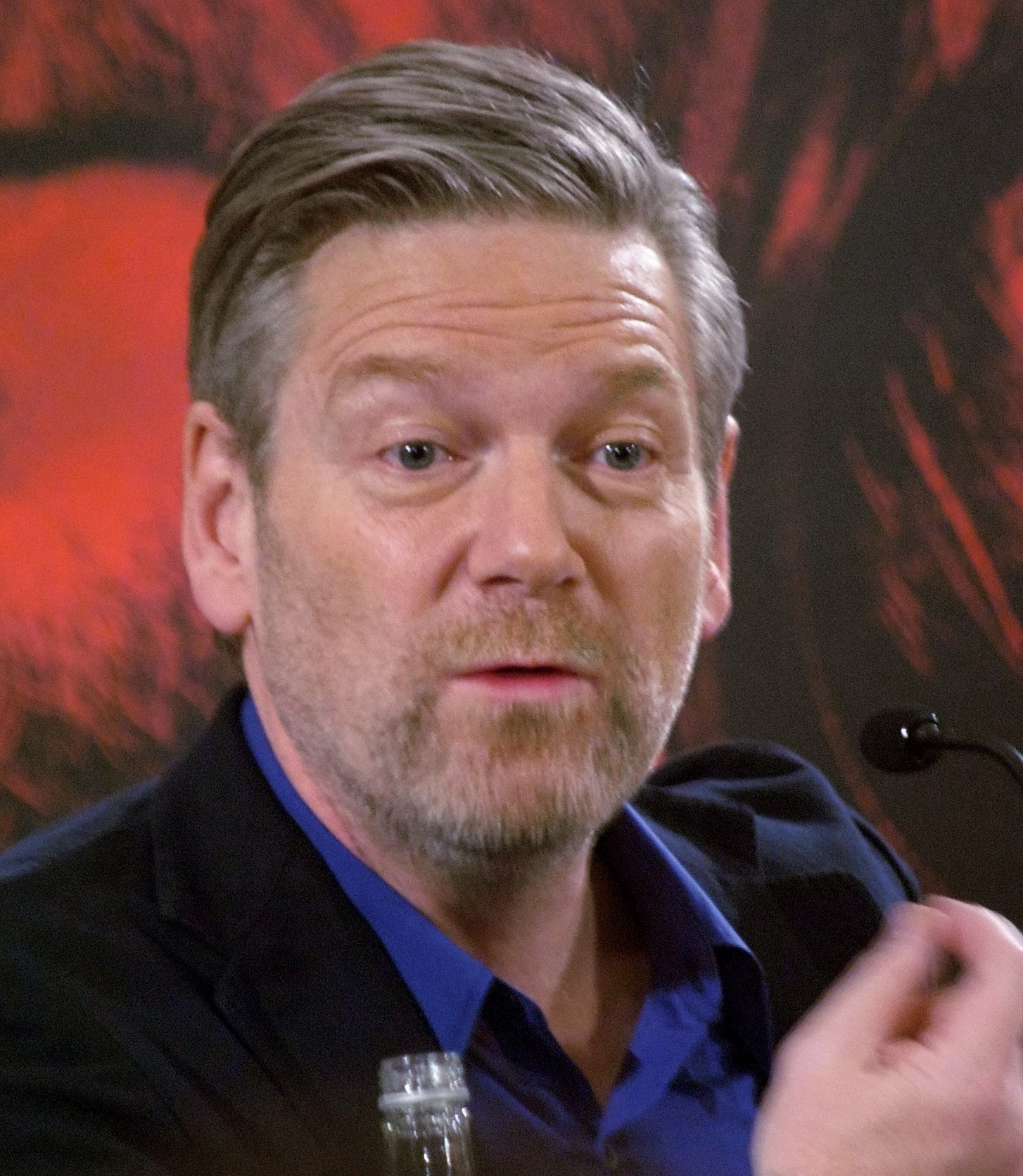
Kenneth Branagh won for Belfast (2021)

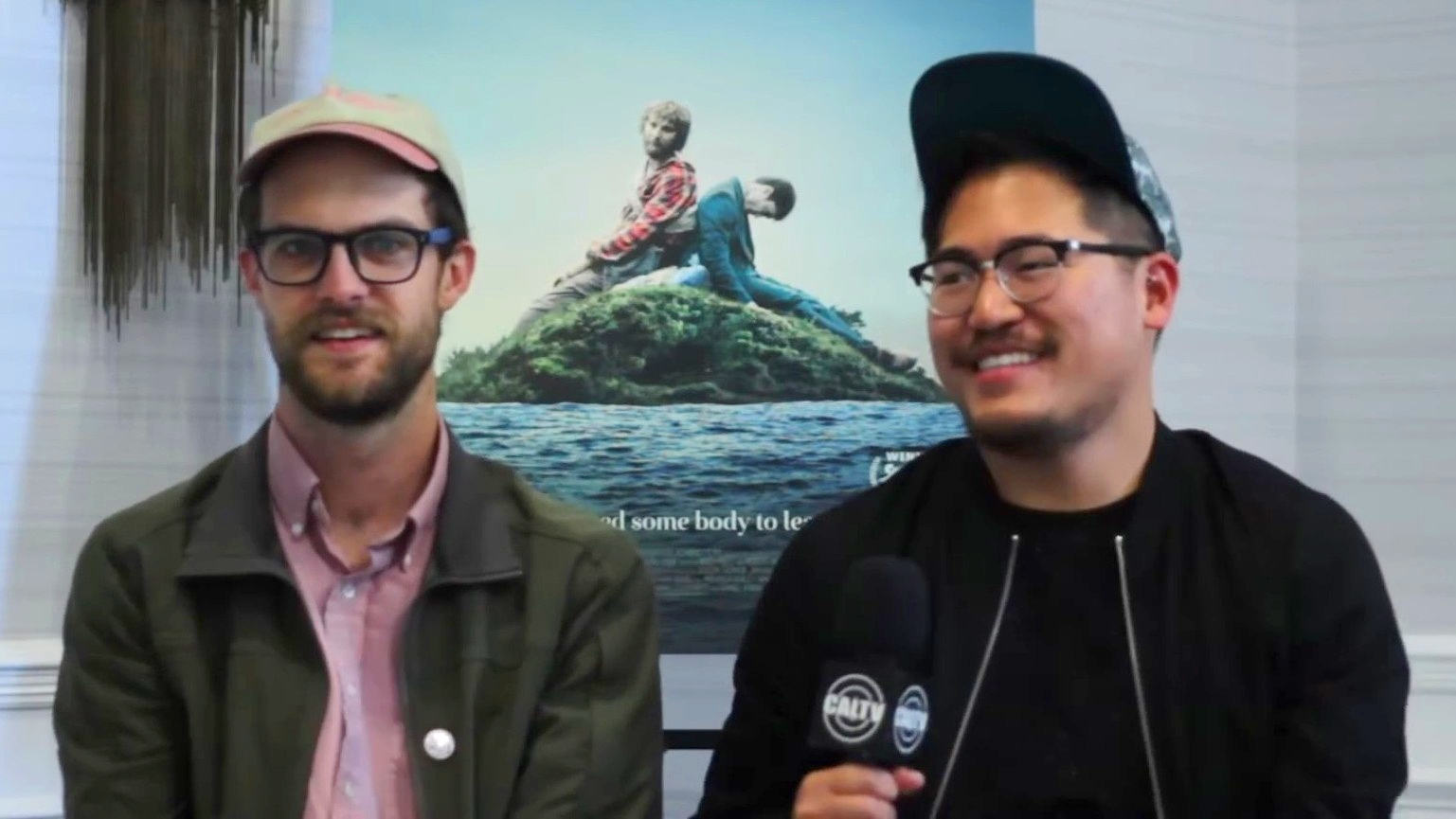
Daniel Scheinert and Daniel Kwan won for Everything Everywhere All at Once (2022)

=== 1990s ===
==== Best Screenplay ====
Year	Writer (s)	Film
1995	Emma Thompson	Sense and Sensibility
1996	Anthony Minghella	The English Patient

==== Best Original Screenplay ====
Year	Writer (s)	Film
1997	Matt Damon and Ben Affleck	Good Will Hunting †
1998	Marc Norman and Tom Stoppard	Shakespeare in Love †
1999	Alan Ball	American Beauty †

=== 2000s ===
==== Best Original Screenplay ====
Year	Writer (s)	Film
2000	Cameron Crowe	Almost Famous †

==== Best Screenplay ====
Year	Writer (s)	Film
2001	Christopher Nolan	Memento
2001	Joel Coen and Ethan Coen	The Man Who Wasn't There
2001	Akiva Goldsman	A Beautiful Mind

==== Best Writer ====
Year	Writer (s)	Film
2002	Charlie Kaufman	Adaptation. and Confessions of a Dangerous Mind
2002	Alexander Payne and Jim Taylor	About Schmidt
2002	Nia Vardalos	My Big Fat Greek Wedding
2003	Jim Sheridan, Naomi Sheridan, and Kirsten Sheridan	In America
2003	John August	Big Fish
2003	Sofia Coppola	Lost in Translation †
2003	Brian Helgeland	Mystic River
2003	Gary Ross	Seabiscuit
2004	Alexander Payne and Jim Taylor	Sideways
2004	Bill Condon	Kinsey
2004	Charlie Kaufman	Eternal Sunshine of the Spotless Mind †
2004	John Logan	The Aviator
2004	David Magee	Finding Neverland
2005	Paul Haggis and Bobby Moresco	Crash †
2005	Noah Baumbach	The Squid and the Whale
2005	George Clooney and Grant Heslov	Good Night, and Good Luck.
2005	Dan Futterman	Capote
2005	Larry McMurtry and Diana Ossana	Brokeback Mountain
2006	Michael Arndt	Little Miss Sunshine †
2006	Guillermo Arriaga	Babel
2006	Todd Field and Tom Perrotta	Little Children
2006	Zach Helm	Stranger than Fiction
2006	William Monahan	The Departed
2006	Peter Morgan	The Queen
2007	Diablo Cody	Juno †
2007	Joel Coen and Ethan Coen	No Country for Old Men
2007	Tony Gilroy	Michael Clayton
2007	Nancy Oliver	Lars and the Real Girl
2007	Sean Penn	Into the Wild
2007	Aaron Sorkin	Charlie Wilson's War
2008	Simon Beaufoy	Slumdog Millionaire
2008	Dustin Lance Black	Milk †
2008	Peter Morgan	Frost/Nixon
2008	Eric Roth	The Curious Case of Benjamin Button
2008	John Patrick Shanley	Doubt

==== Best Original Screenplay ====
Year	Writer (s)	Film
2009	Quentin Tarantino	Inglourious Basterds
2009	Mark Boal	The Hurt Locker †
2009	Joel Coen and Ethan Coen	A Serious Man
2009	Scott Neustadter and Michael H. Weber	(500) Days of Summer
2009	Bob Peterson and Pete Docter	Up

=== 2010s ===
Year	Writer (s)	Film
2010	David Seidler	The King's Speech †
2010	Lisa Cholodenko and Stuart Blumberg	The Kids Are All Right
2010	Mark Heyman, Andres Heinz, and John McLaughlin	Black Swan
2010	Mike Leigh	Another Year
2010	Christopher Nolan	Inception
2010	Scott Silver, Eric Johnson, Paul Tamasy, and Keith Dorrington	The Fighter
2011	Woody Allen	Midnight in Paris †
2011	Diablo Cody	Young Adult
2011	Michel Hazanavicius	The Artist
2011	Tom McCarthy and Joe Tiboni	Win Win
2011	Will Reiser	50/50
2012	Quentin Tarantino	Django Unchained †
2012	Paul Thomas Anderson	The Master
2012	Wes Anderson and Roman Coppola	Moonrise Kingdom
2012	Mark Boal	Zero Dark Thirty
2012	John Gatins	Flight
2012	Rian Johnson	Looper
2013	Spike Jonze	Her †
2013	Woody Allen	Blue Jasmine
2013	Joel Coen and Ethan Coen	Inside Llewyn Davis
2013	Bob Nelson	Nebraska
2013	Eric Warren Singer and David O. Russell	American Hustle
2014	Alejandro G. Iñárritu, Nicolás Giacobone, Alexander Dinelaris Jr., and Armando Bó	Birdman †
2014	Wes Anderson and Hugo Guinness	The Grand Budapest Hotel
2014	Damien Chazelle	Whiplash
2014	Dan Gilroy	Nightcrawler
2014	Richard Linklater	Boyhood
2015	Tom McCarthy and Josh Singer	Spotlight †
2015	Matt Charman, Ethan Coen, and Joel Coen	Bridge of Spies
2015	Pete Docter, Meg LeFauve, and Josh Cooley	Inside Out
2015	Alex Garland	Ex Machina
2015	Quentin Tarantino	The Hateful Eight
2016	Damien Chazelle (TIE)	La La Land
2016	Kenneth Lonergan (TIE)	Manchester by the Sea †
2016	Efthimis Filippou and Yorgos Lanthimos	The Lobster
2016	Barry Jenkins	Moonlight ‡
2016	Jeff Nichols	Loving
2016	Taylor Sheridan	Hell or High Water
2017	Jordan Peele	Get Out †
2017	Guillermo del Toro and Vanessa Taylor	The Shape of Water
2017	Greta Gerwig	Lady Bird
2017	Emily V. Gordon and Kumail Nanjiani	The Big Sick
2017	Liz Hannah and Josh Singer	The Post
2017	Martin McDonagh	Three Billboards Outside Ebbing, Missouri
2018	Paul Schrader	First Reformed
2018	Bo Burnham	Eighth Grade
2018	Alfonso Cuarón	Roma
2018	Deborah Davis and Tony McNamara	The Favourite
2018	Adam McKay	Vice
2018	Nick Vallelonga, Brian Hayes Currie, and Peter Farrelly	Green Book †
2018	Bryan Woods, Scott Beck, and John Krasinski	A Quiet Place
2019	Quentin Tarantino	Once Upon a Time in Hollywood
2019	Noah Baumbach	Marriage Story
2019	Bong Joon-ho and Han Jin-won	Parasite †
2019	Rian Johnson	Knives Out
2019	Lulu Wang	The Farewell

=== 2020s ===
Year	Writer (s)	Film
2020	Emerald Fennell	Promising Young Woman †
2020	Lee Isaac Chung	Minari
2020	Jack Fincher (posthumous)	Mank
2020	Eliza Hittman	Never Rarely Sometimes Always
2020	Darius Marder and Abraham Marder	Sound of Metal
2020	Aaron Sorkin	The Trial of the Chicago 7
2021	Kenneth Branagh	Belfast †
2021	Paul Thomas Anderson	Licorice Pizza
2021	Zach Baylin	King Richard
2021	Adam McKay and David Sirota	Don't Look Up
2021	Aaron Sorkin	Being the Ricardos
2022	Daniel Kwan and Daniel Scheinert	Everything Everywhere All at Once †
2022	Todd Field	Tár
2022	Martin McDonagh	The Banshees of Inisherin
2022	Steven Spielberg and Tony Kushner	The Fabelmans
2022	Charlotte Wells	Aftersun
2023	Greta Gerwig and Noah Baumbach	Barbie
2023	Samy Burch	May December
2023	Alex Convery	Air
2023	Bradley Cooper and Josh Singer	Maestro
2023	David Hemingson	The Holdovers
2023	Celine Song	Past Lives
2024	Coralie Fargeat	The Substance
2024	Sean Baker	Anora †
2024	Moritz Binder, Tim Fehlbaum, and Alex David	September 5
2024	Brady Corbet and Mona Fastvold	The Brutalist
2024	Jesse Eisenberg	A Real Pain
2024	Justin Kuritzkes	Challengers
2025	Ryan Coogler	Sinners †
2025	Noah Baumbach and Emily Mortimer	Jay Kelly
2025	Ronald Bronstein and Josh Safdie	Marty Supreme
2025	Zach Cregger	Weapons
2025	Eva Victor	Sorry, Baby
2025	Eskil Vogt and Joachim Trier	Sentimental Value

== See also ==
- Golden Globe Award for Best Screenplay
- BAFTA Award for Best Original Screenplay
- Academy Award for Best Original Screenplay
- Independent Spirit Award for Best Screenplay
- AACTA International Award for Best Screenplay
- Writers Guild of America Award for Best Original Screenplay
