= 12th Critics' Choice Awards =

2007 US film awards

- Date: January 14, 2007
- Official website: www.criticschoice.com

Highlights
- Best Film: The Departed

The 12th Critics' Choice Awards were presented on January 14, 2007, honoring the finest achievements of 2006 filmmaking. The event was held at the Santa Monica Civic Auditorium in Santa Monica, California and broadcast on E!.

== Top 10 films ==
(in alphabetical order)

- Babel
- Blood Diamond
- The Departed
- Dreamgirls
- Letters from Iwo Jima
- Little Children
- Little Miss Sunshine
- Notes on a Scandal
- The Queen
- United 93

== Winners and nominees ==
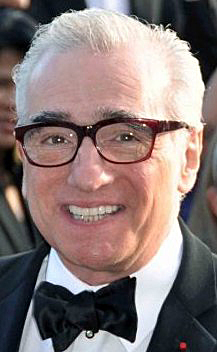
Martin Scorsese, Best Director winner

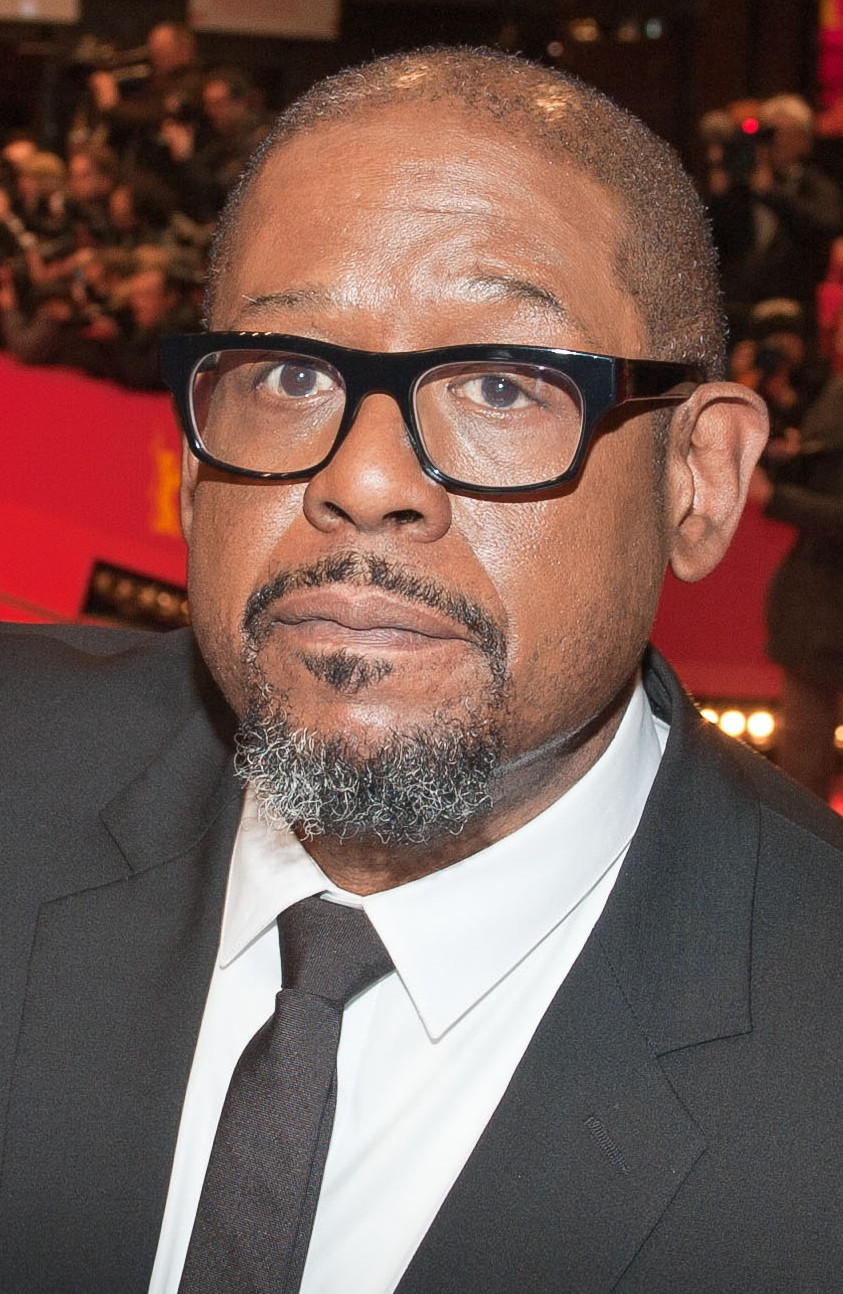
Forest Whitaker, Best Actor winner

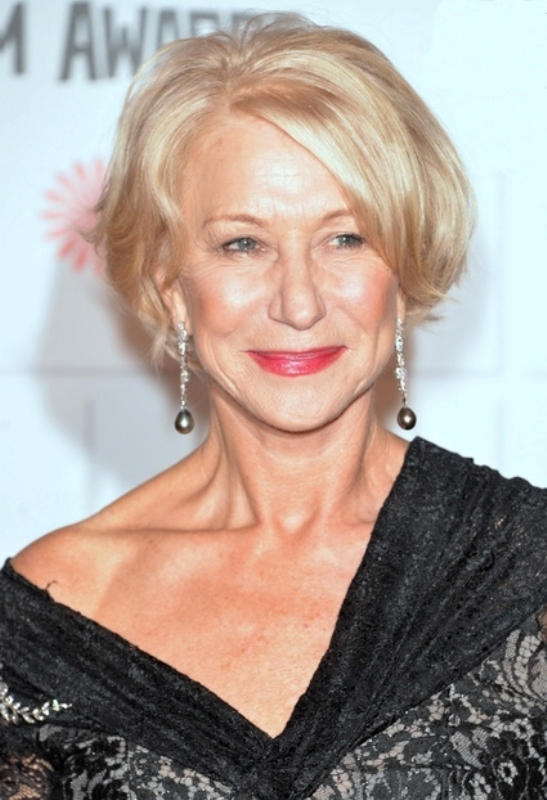
Helen Mirren, Best Actress winner

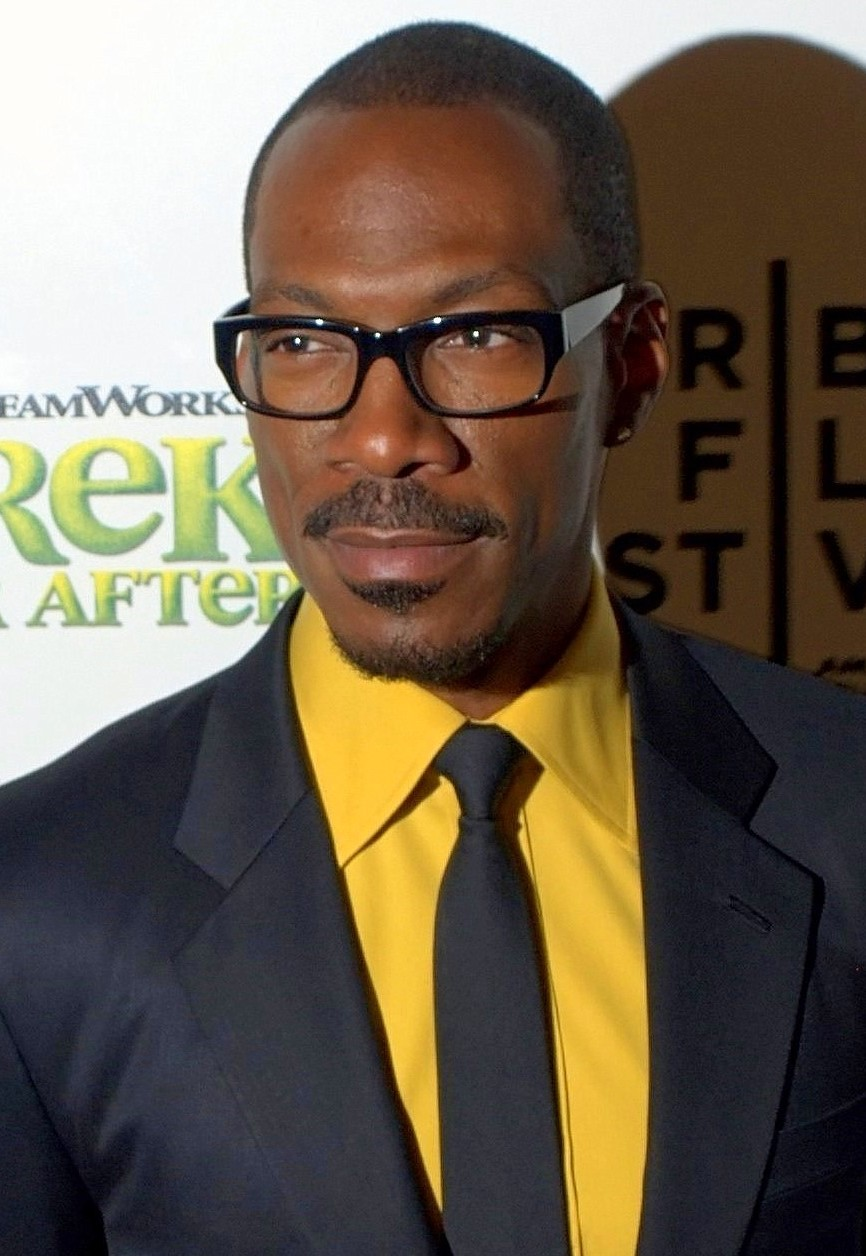
Eddie Murphy, Best Supporting Actor winner

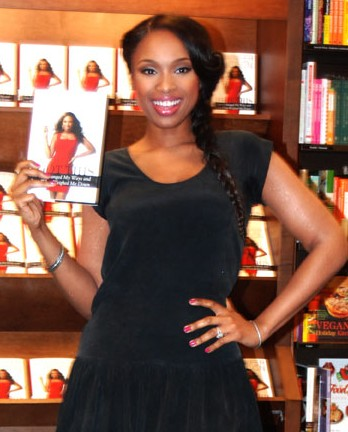
Jennifer Hudson, Best Supporting Actress winner

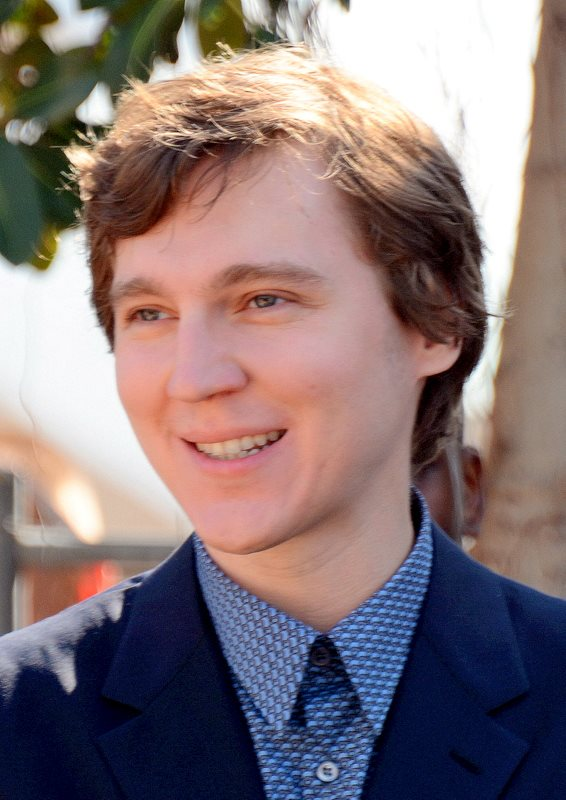
Paul Dano, Best Young Actor winner

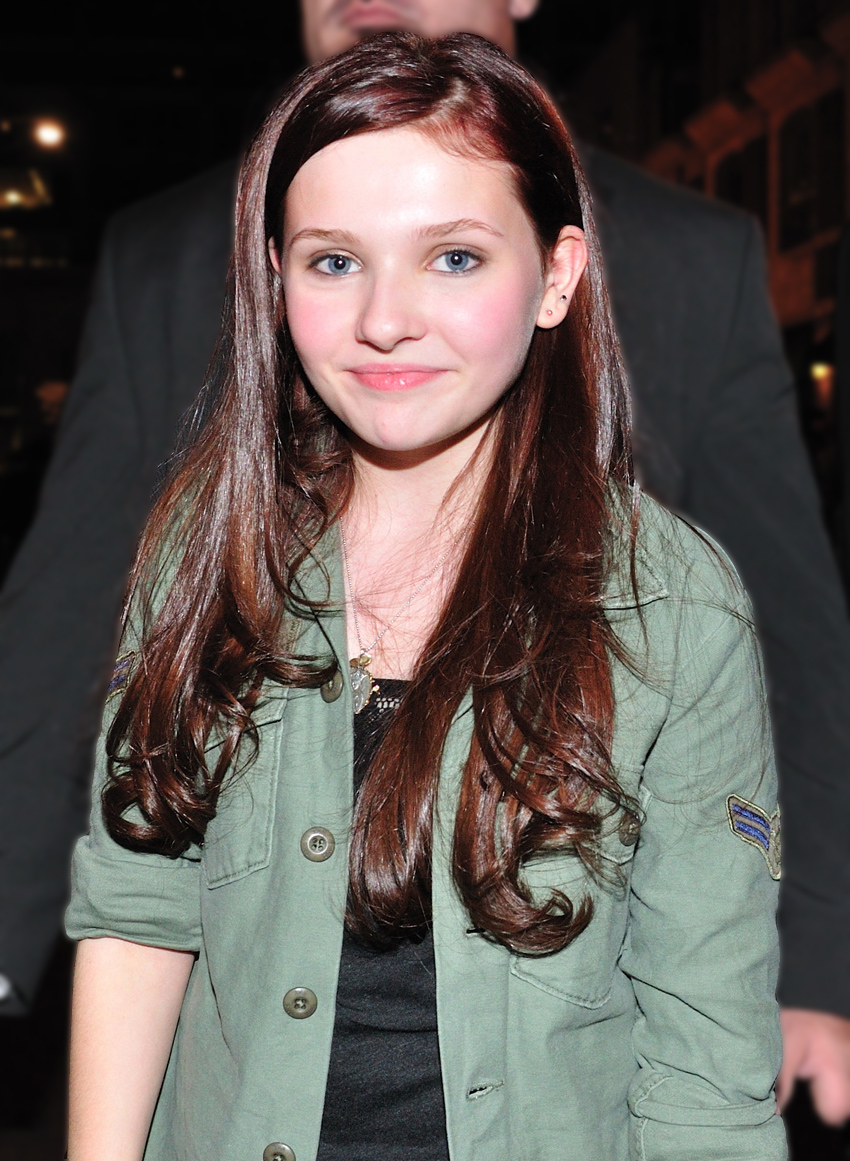
Abigail Breslin, Best Young Actress winner

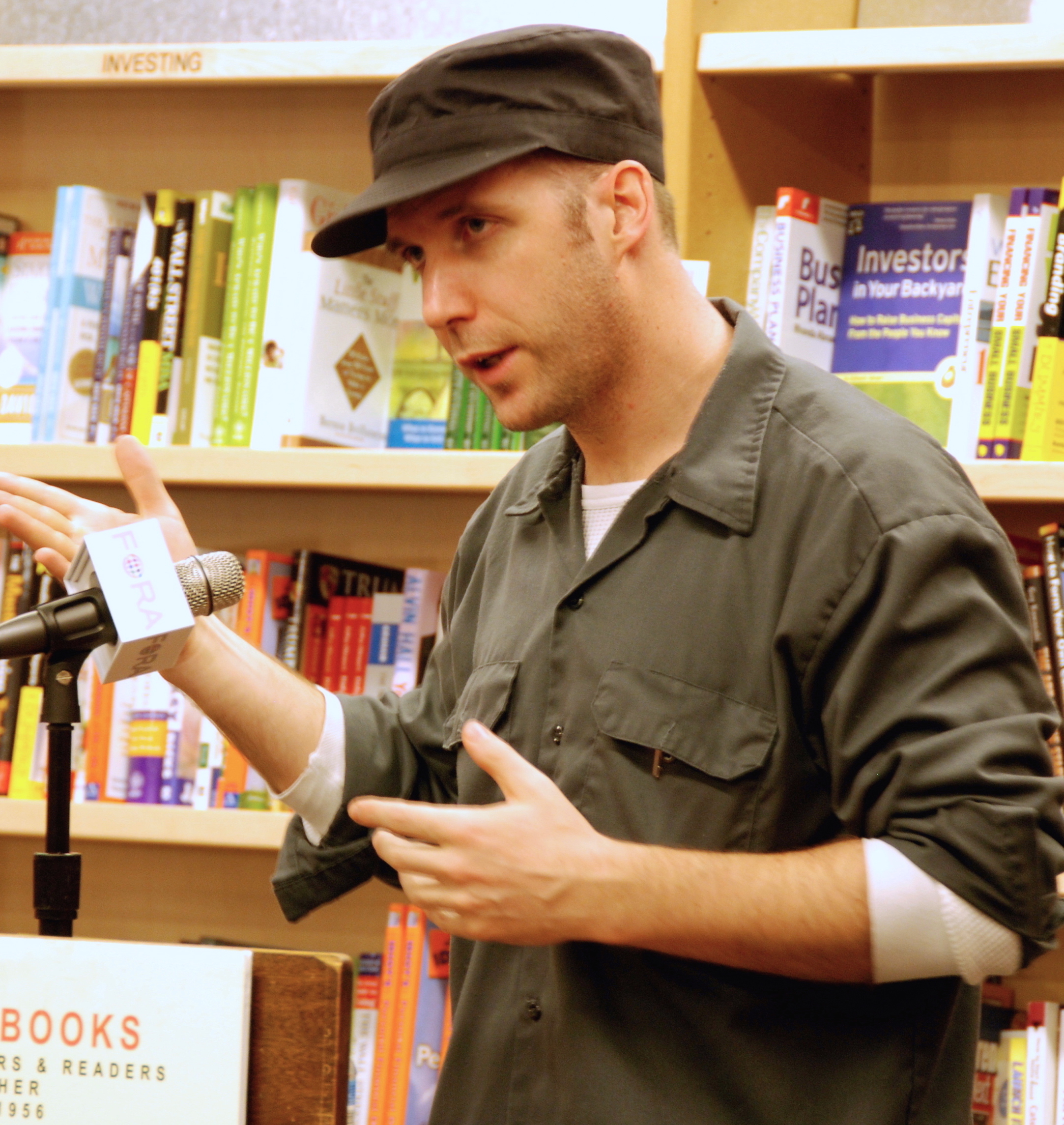
Michael Arndt, Best Writer winner

Best Picture The Departed: Babel; Blood Diamond; Dreamgirls; Letters from Iwo Jima; Little Children; Little Miss Sunshine; Notes on a Scandal; The Queen; United 93	Best Director Martin Scorsese – The Departed: Bill Condon – Dreamgirls; Clint Eastwood – Letters from Iwo Jima; Stephen Frears – The Queen; Paul Greengrass – United 93
Best Actor Forest Whitaker – The Last King of Scotland as Idi Amin: Leonardo DiCaprio – Blood Diamond as Danny Archer; Leonardo DiCaprio – The Departed as Billy Costigan; Ryan Gosling – Half Nelson as Dan Dunne; Peter O'Toole – Venus as Maurice Russell; Will Smith – The Pursuit of Happyness as Chris Gardner	Best Actress Helen Mirren – The Queen as Queen Elizabeth II: Penélope Cruz – Volver as Raimunda; Judi Dench – Notes on a Scandal as Barbara Covett; Meryl Streep – The Devil Wears Prada as Miranda Priestly; Kate Winslet – Little Children as Sarah Pierce
Best Supporting Actor Eddie Murphy – Dreamgirls as James "Thunder" Early: Ben Affleck – Hollywoodland as George Reeves; Alan Arkin – Little Miss Sunshine as Edwin Hoover; Adam Beach – Flags of Our Fathers as Ira Hayes; Djimon Hounsou – Blood Diamond as Solomon Vandy; Jack Nicholson – The Departed as Frank Costello	Best Supporting Actress Jennifer Hudson – Dreamgirls as Effie White: Adriana Barraza – Babel as Amelia Hernández; Cate Blanchett – Notes on a Scandal as Sheba Hart; Rinko Kikuchi – Babel as Chieko Wataya; Catherine O'Hara – For Your Consideration as Marilyn Hack; Emma Thompson – Stranger than Fiction as Karen Eiffel
Best Young Actor Paul Dano – Little Miss Sunshine as Dwayne Hoover: Cameron Bright – Thank You for Smoking as Joey Naylor; Joseph Cross – Running with Scissors as Augusten Burroughs; Freddie Highmore – A Good Year as Young Max; Jaden Smith – The Pursuit of Happyness as Christopher Gardner Jr.	Best Young Actress Abigail Breslin – Little Miss Sunshine as Olive Hoover: Ivana Baquero – Pan's Labyrinth as Ofelia / Princess Moanna; Shareeka Epps – Half Nelson as Drey; Dakota Fanning – Charlotte's Web as Fern Arable; Keke Palmer – Akeelah and the Bee as Akeelah Anderson
Best Acting Ensemble Little Miss Sunshine: Babel; Bobby; The Departed; Dreamgirls; A Prairie Home Companion	Best Writer Little Miss Sunshine – Michael Arndt: Babel – Guillermo Arriaga; The Departed – William Monahan; Little Children – Todd Field and Tom Perrotta; The Queen – Peter Morgan; Stranger than Fiction – Zach Helm
Best Animated Feature Cars: Flushed Away; Happy Feet; Monster House; Over the Hedge	Best Documentary Feature An Inconvenient Truth: Dixie Chicks: Shut Up and Sing; This Film Is Not Yet Rated; Who Killed the Electric Car?; Wordplay
Best Family Film Charlotte's Web: Akeelah and the Bee; Flicka; Lassie; Pirates of the Caribbean: Dead Man's Chest	Best Foreign Language Film Letters from Iwo Jima • United States: Apocalypto • United States; Days of Glory • Algeria / Belgium / France / Morocco; Pan's Labyrinth • Mexico / Spain; Volver • Spain; Water • Canada / India / United States
Best Composer The Illusionist – Philip Glass: Babel – Gustavo Santaolalla; The Da Vinci – Hans Zimmer; The Departed – Howard Shore; The Fountain – Clint Mansell; The Good German – Thomas Newman	Best Song "Listen" – Dreamgirls: "I Need to Wake Up" – An Inconvenient Truth; "My Little Girl" – Flicka; "The Neighbor" – Dixie Chicks: Shut Up and Sing; "Never Gonna Break My Faith" – Bobby; "Ordinary Miracle" – Charlotte's Web
Best Comedy Movie Borat: The Devil Wears Prada; For Your Consideration; Little Miss Sunshine; Thank You for Smoking	Best Soundtrack Dreamgirls: Babel; Cars; Happy Feet; Marie Antoinette

=== Best Picture Made for Television ===
Elizabeth I

- The Librarian: Return to King Solomon's Mines
- Nightmares & Dreamscapes: From the Stories of Stephen King
- The Ron Clark Story
- When the Levees Broke: A Requiem in Four Acts

== Statistics ==
Nominations	Film
7	Babel
7	The Departed
7	Dreamgirls
7	Little Miss Sunshine
4	The Queen
3	Blood Diamond
3	Charlotte's Web
3	Letters from Iwo Jima
3	Little Children
3	Notes on a Scandal
2	Akeelah and the Bee
2	Bobby
2	Cars
2	The Devil Wears Prada
2	Dixie Chicks: Shut Up and Sing
2	Flicka
2	For Your Consideration
2	Half Nelson
2	Happy Feet
2	An Inconvenient Truth
2	Pan's Labyrinth
2	The Pursuit of Happyness
2	Stranger than Fiction
2	Thank You for Smoking
2	United 93
2	Volver

Wins	Film
4	Dreamgirls
4	Little Miss Sunshine
2	The Departed
