= Jackie Burch =

American casting director (1951–2025)

- Born: March 25, 1951; Newburgh, New York, U.S.
- Died: October 12, 2025 (aged 74); Atlanta, Georgia, U.S.
- Occupation: Casting director
- Notable work: Die Hard, The Breakfast Club
- Children: Samy and Molly Burch

Jackie Burch (March 25, 1951 – October 12, 2025) was an American casting director of film and television.

== Career ==
Burch originally worked as a teacher for the deaf before filling in as an assistant for an executive at Universal Pictures and deciding to transition to working in the entertainment industry.

Burch cast more than 100 film and television productions and worked with directors including John Hughes, John Landis, Warren Beatty, Peter Bogdanovich, and Jim Abrahams.

== Personal life ==
Her daughters are screenwriter Samy Burch, and singer-songwriter Molly Burch.

Burch died in Atlanta after a several-month battle with endometrial cancer on October 12, 2025, at the age of 74.

== Notable credits as casting director ==
- Sixteen Candles (1984)
- The Breakfast Club (1985)
- Into the Night (1985)
- Mask (1985)
- Weird Science (1985)
- Fright Night (1985)
- Commando (1985)
- Three Amigos! (1986)
- Project X (1987)
- Predator (1987)
- The Running Man (1987)
- Coming to America (1988)
- Die Hard (1988)
- Road House (1989)
- Another 48 Hrs. (1990)
- Dick Tracy (1990)
- Die Hard 2 (1990)
- The Adventures of Ford Fairlane (1990)
- Predator 2 (1990)
- Oscar (1991)
- Hudson Hawk (1991)
- Christmas in Connecticut (1992)
- Unlawful Entry (1992)
- Beverly Hills Cop III (1994)
- Judge Dredd (1995)
- I Still Know What You Did Last Summer (1998)
- End of Days (1999)
- The Santa Clause 2 (2002)

== Awards ==
- 2018: Artios Award Outstanding Achievement in Casting – Studio or Independent for Gifted (nominee)
- 2017: Artios Award for Outstanding Achievement in Casting – Big Budget Feature (Drama) for Hidden Figures (winner)
- 2017: Emmy Award for Outstanding Casting for a Limited Series, Movie or a Special for Bessie (nominee)
- 2012: Artios Award for Outstanding Achievement in Casting – Big Budget Feature (Drama) for The Hunger Games (nominee)
- 2011: Artios Award for Outstanding Achievement in Casting – Feature – Studio or Independent Drama for The Conspirator (nominee)
- 1991: Artios Award for Best Casting for Feature Film, Comedy for Dick Tracy (nominee)
- 1986: Artios Award for Best Casting for Feature Film, Drama for Mask (nominee)
- 1985: Artios Award for Best Casting for Feature Film for Sixteen Candles (nominee)
