= First Flower =

Studio album by Molly Burch
- Released: October 5, 2018
- Studios: Cacophony Recorders, Austin, Texas
- Genres: Indie pop; indie rock; country
- Length: 37:27
- Label: Captured Tracks
- Producers: Molly Burch; Erik Wofford

Molly Burch chronology
Please Be Mine (2017)	First Flower (2018)	The Molly Burch Christmas Album (2019)

Singles from First Flower
- 1. "Wild" Released: July 26, 2018; 2. "To the Boys" Released: August 21, 2018; 3. "Candy" Released: September 26, 2018

Professional ratings
Aggregate scores
Source	Rating
AnyDecentMusic?	7.2/10
Metacritic	77/100
Review scores
Source	Rating
AllMusic	3.5/5 stars
American Songwriter	4/5 stars
The Austin Chronicle	4/5 stars
Clash	8/10
Loud and Quiet	8/10
Paste	7.5/10
Pitchfork	6.7/10

First Flower is the second studio album by American musician Molly Burch. It was released October 5, 2018 under Captured Tracks.

== Release ==
On July 26, 2018, Burch announced the release of her new album, along with the first single "Wild". The music video to "Wild", which was directed by Luca Venter, was also released the same day.

The second single "To The Boys" was released on August 21, 2018. The music video for the single, which was directed by Emily Ann Hoffman, was released on September 17, 2018.

On September 26, 2018, Burch release the third single "Candy". The music video for the single, which was directed by American actress Noël Wells, was released on November 21, 2018.

== Critical reception ==
First Flower was met with "generally favorable" reviews from critics. At Metacritic, which assigns a weighted average rating out of 100 to reviews from mainstream publications, this release received an average score of 77, based on 10 reviews. Aggregator Album of the Year gave the release a 75 out of 100 based on a critical consensus of 10 reviews.

Hal Horowitz from American Songwriter said of the album: "Burch moves further towards a looser, jazzier feel on these 11 tracks. The songs often bubble on a light Latin/bossa nova bed, allowing Burch to swoop and slather her distinctive whispered yet tensile voice over the melodies. Molly Burch is a chanteuse, exploring the edges of noir songs with beauty, sadness, and an honest vulnerability that’s powerful yet strikingly understated" Abby Johnston from The Austin Chronicle stated the difference between this album and Burch's previous album by saying: "Burch grapples with similarly universal themes of self-doubt and anxiety, and as with her first album, the ruminations are set over beachy, sepia-washed guitar rock. Gone, however, are the more muted vocal plays." Mike Vinti from Loud and Quiet admired the vocals from Burch on the album, noting: "It’s not that this is any less personal than that first outing, but more that Burch has embraced the parts of her craft that set her apart, most obviously her unmistakable voice. Trained in Jazz Vocal Performance, Burch is able to conjure strange and powerful pronunciations and inflections like few of her peers." Lee Zimmerman from Paste said: "much of the album sounds almost idyllic, its ambiance seemingly more airy than effusive. Burch has managed to find common ground between desire and determination and meld them with steady assurance."

== Track listing ==
First Flower track listing
No.	Title	Length
1.	"Candy"	2:50
2.	"Wild"	3:40
3.	"Dangerous Place"	2:33
4.	"First Flower"	3:24
5.	"Next to Me"	2:28
6.	"Good Behavior"	4:03
7.	"Without You"	2:45
8.	"To the Boys"	3:47
9.	"True Love"	2:43
10.	"Nothing to Say"	3:52
11.	"Every Little Thing"	5:23

== Personnel ==
Musicians

- Molly Burch – primary artist, producer
- Jason Chronis – keyboard
- Dailey Toliver – keyboard
- Dan Duszynski – guitar
- Sam Kossler – guitar
- Matthew Shepherd – drums

Production

- Erik Wofford – producer
- Josh Bonati – mastering
