= Zach Helm =

American dramatist (born 1975)

- Born: Zachary E. Helm; January 21, 1975 (age 51); Santa Clara, California, U.S.
- Education: DePaul University (BFA)
- Occupations: Film director, film producer, screenwriter
- Spouse: Kiele Sanchez (m. 2001; div. 2008)

Zach Helm (born January 21, 1975) is an American film director, producer, and screenwriter. He's known for his work on the films Stranger than Fiction (2006) and Mr. Magorium's Wonder Emporium (2007), as well as the stage play Good Canary and its 2009 screen adaptation.

== Early life ==
In 1996, Helm graduated from DePaul University, where he trained as an actor. After being chosen for a writer's program by Fox 2000 Pictures, he spent several years doing uncredited rewrites for film scripts.

== Career ==
He wrote the 2006 fantasy comedy-drama film Stranger than Fiction, for which he won the National Board of Review Award for Best Original Screenplay and the PEN Center USA West Literary Award for screenplay. The script also won him nominations for the Critics Choice Award for Best Writer, the Writers Guild of America Award for Best Original Screenplay and the Saturn Award for Best Writing.

In 2006, Helm was approached to direct Mr. Magorium's Wonder Emporium, for which he had previously written a screenplay. In 2013, he described the movie as a "Technicolor train-wreck" as reported by online tabloid news source TMZ.

He began Interviewing the Audience in 2008, a revival of one of Spalding Gray's performance pieces which he had seen while in college. As the title suggests, audience members are brought onto the stage and interviewed, their personal stories and insights extracted in long-form conversations meant to create a sense of communal intimacy but challenge the convention of theater and story. Helm's approach differed from Gray's in that Helm's conversations were entirely extemporaneous, without any prepared questions, and the audience members were drawn at random. Helm tended to find and illuminate themes and connections within the interviews, thereby creating a through-line for each performance as it happened.

Helm wrote Le Bon Canari (Good Canary), which was produced in France in 2007, then translated into Spanish (El Buen Canario) and produced in Mexico. It was translated into English in 2016 for the Rose Theatre Kingston. Drawn from Helm's personal experiences, the play is known for its dark humor, coarse language, and views on sexism and misogyny as well as its use of Brechtian devices.

In 2013, Helm was announced as the director for a film production titled Culo Quasars Cocaine Chaos, the script for which he adapted from the true story of Paul Frampton. The movie was never made. In 2016, Helm adapted the Epic Magazine article "The Mercenary" for Fox, collaborating with journalists Josh Davis and Josh Bearman.

== Personal life ==
Helm was married to actress Kiele Sanchez from 2001 to 2008.

== Filmography ==
TV movies

Year	Title	Writer	Executive Producer
2003	Other People's Business	Yes	Yes
2009	Good Canary	Yes	No

Feature films

Year	Title	Director	Writer
2006	Stranger than Fiction	No	Yes
2007	Mr. Magorium's Wonder Emporium	Yes	Yes
2022	Deep Water	No	Yes
