= National Board of Review Award for Best Original Screenplay =

Annual US film award

The National Board of Review Award for Best Original Screenplay is an annual award given (since 2003) by the National Board of Review of Motion Pictures.

== Winners ==
=== 2000s ===
Year	Winner	Writer(s)
2002	Human Nature and Adaptation	Charlie Kaufman
2003	In America	Jim Sheridan, Kirsten Sheridan, and Naomi Sheridan
2004	Eternal Sunshine of the Spotless Mind	Charlie Kaufman
2005	The Squid and the Whale	Noah Baumbach
2006	Stranger than Fiction	Zach Helm
2007	Juno	Diablo Cody
2007	Lars and the Real Girl	Nancy Oliver
2008	Gran Torino	Nick Schenk
2009	A Serious Man	Joel Coen and Ethan Coen

=== 2010s ===
Year	Winner	Writer(s)
2010	Buried	Chris Sparling
2011	50/50	Will Reiser
2012	Looper	Rian Johnson
2013	Inside Llewyn Davis	Joel Coen and Ethan Coen
2014	The Lego Movie	Phil Lord and Christopher Miller
2015	The Hateful Eight	Quentin Tarantino
2016	Manchester by the Sea	Kenneth Lonergan
2017	Phantom Thread	Paul Thomas Anderson
2018	First Reformed	Paul Schrader
2019	Uncut Gems	Ronald Bronstein, Josh Safdie and Benny Safdie

=== 2020s ===
Year	Winner	Writer(s)
2020	Minari	Lee Isaac Chung
2021	A Hero	Asghar Farhadi
2022	The Banshees of Inisherin	Martin McDonagh
2023	The Holdovers	David Hemingson
2024	Hard Truths	Mike Leigh
2025	Sinners	Ryan Coogler

== Multiple winners ==
- Charlie Kaufman - 2
- Coen brothers - 2
