= Elio Morillo =

Ecuadorian-Boricua aerospace engineer

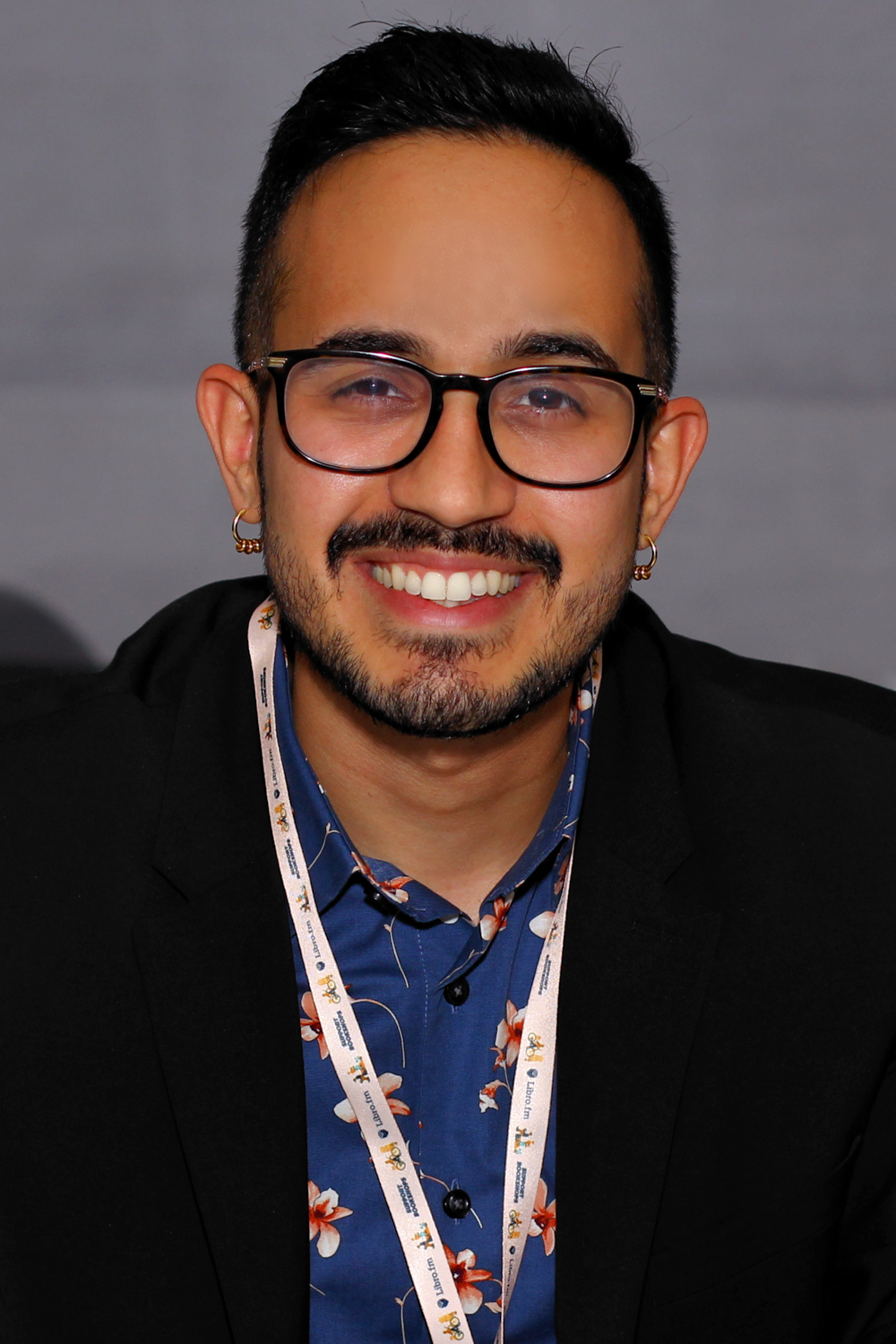
- Morillo at the 2023 Texas Book Festival
- Born: Ecuador
- Education: Mechanical Engineering
- Alma mater: University of Michigan
- Occupation: Aerospace Engineer
- Employer: NASA
- Notable work: Perseverance robotic inventor, capturing never before seen images of Mars.

Elio Morillo Baquerizo is an Ecuadorian-Boricua aerospace engineer at NASA's Jet Propulsion Laboratory in Pasadena, California. Morillo won the SHPE-EL Poder en Ti Scholarship while attending the University of Michigan, pursuing this degree in Mechanical Engineering.

Morillo is known for his work on the Mars 2020 program named Perseverance. The Perseverance was the fifth rover sent to Mars after Sojourner, Spirit, Opportunity, and Curiosity. The mission for Mars 2020 was the first mission that was able to collect rocks and small fragments, dust and sand from the surface.

== Education ==
Morillo pursued his academic journey at University of Michigan, where he successfully obtained a degree in mechanical engineering. Motivated by his passion for space exploration, he continued his education at the same university and earned a master's degree specializing in space systems design. His dedication and hard work were recognized during his time at University of Michigan when he was awarded the SHPE-EL Poder en Ti Scholarship.

== Career ==

Morillo embarked on his NASA career in 2016, initially joining as a young engineer working on the Mars 2020 System test bed. His dedication and expertise led to his promotion as the Mars 2020 Engineering Operations Mechanisms Lead. As his career progressed, Morillo was further elevated to the esteemed position of Operations Mechanisms Chair. During this time, he played a pivotal role in the Mars 2020 Ingenuity Helicopter project, serving as the Operator. He wasn't just the operator but was also the first to fly the demo version as well.

Morillo's contributions to the Mars 2020 program have been widely recognized. Under his guidance, the mission successfully deployed the Perseverance rover, which embarked on a seven-month journey to Mars. On February 18, the rover achieved a safe landing, marking a significant milestone as the most substantial and advanced vehicle ever sent to another planet. The Perseverance joined the ranks of previous successful Mars rovers, including Sojourner, Spirit, Opportunity, and Curiosity.

The primary objective of the Mars 2020 mission was to collect rocks, small fragments, dust, and sand from the Martian surface. Equipped with a robotic arm, the rover could analyze samples immediately upon contact. Notably, the Perseverance also featured an instrument called MOXIE, which stands for "Mars Oxygen In Situ Experiment." This innovative device demonstrated the capability to convert carbon dioxide into oxygen on the Red Planet.

Morillo has also released a memoir about his experience being Hispanic in college, called "The Boy Who Reached for the Stars." When asked about the memoir, Morillo said, "I hope my memoir inspires students to reach beyond the stars, reminding them that their dreams are not just fantasies, but destinies waiting to be fulfilled."
