= Tony Spear =

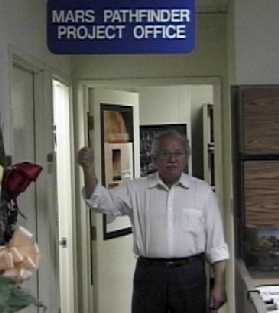
- Spear at JPL
- Born: 1937
- Died: June 3, 2024 (aged 86–87)
- Education: University of Southern California

Anthony Spear (1937 - 3 June 2024) was an American space exploration project manager most notable for leading the Mars Pathfinder mission for JPL/NASA in 1996. He retired from JPL in 1998. He competed for the Google Lunar X Prize with Red Whittaker, Astrobotic, and Carnegie Mellon University, where he received a B.S. degree in electrical engineering in 1962.

== Career ==
After graduating from high school, Spear spent four years in the US Air Force attending radio school and working in radio repair on jet fighters. He then went on to get his B.S. from Carnegie Mellon, and then an M.S. degree from the University of Southern California.

Spear worked at JPL in Pasadena, California while taking classes toward his master's degree. He also did graduate work in the Engineering Executive Program at the UCLA and earned a master's of engineering.

Spear held many different jobs since beginning his career at JPL in 1962. He first started out in Deep Space Telecommunication System Engineering where he was involved in the design and development of NASA's Mariner program missions from 1964 to 1973. He also helped design the lander-orbiter relay communications link for the Viking program mission in 1976.

From 1975 to 1979, he began to manage the development and implementation of the microwave instruments for the NASA SEASAT mission, including the first synthetic aperture imaging radar to fly in space. For the next 11 years, Spear worked in various capacities for the Magellan probe mission.

After leading JPL's initial studies of NASA's "faster, better, cheaper" fixed-priced, low-cost, quick-reaction Discovery program missions, Tony Spear began working as the project manager for the Mars Pathfinder mission. He managed the successful landing of the Pathfinder shuttle and the Sojourner rover.

Said Daniel S. Goldin of Spear, "Tony Spear was a legendary project manager at JPL and helped make Mars Pathfinder the riveting success that it was."

Minor planet 6487 Tonyspear is named after him. He died on June 4 2024 at 87
