= Andrew Mishkin =

American systems engineer

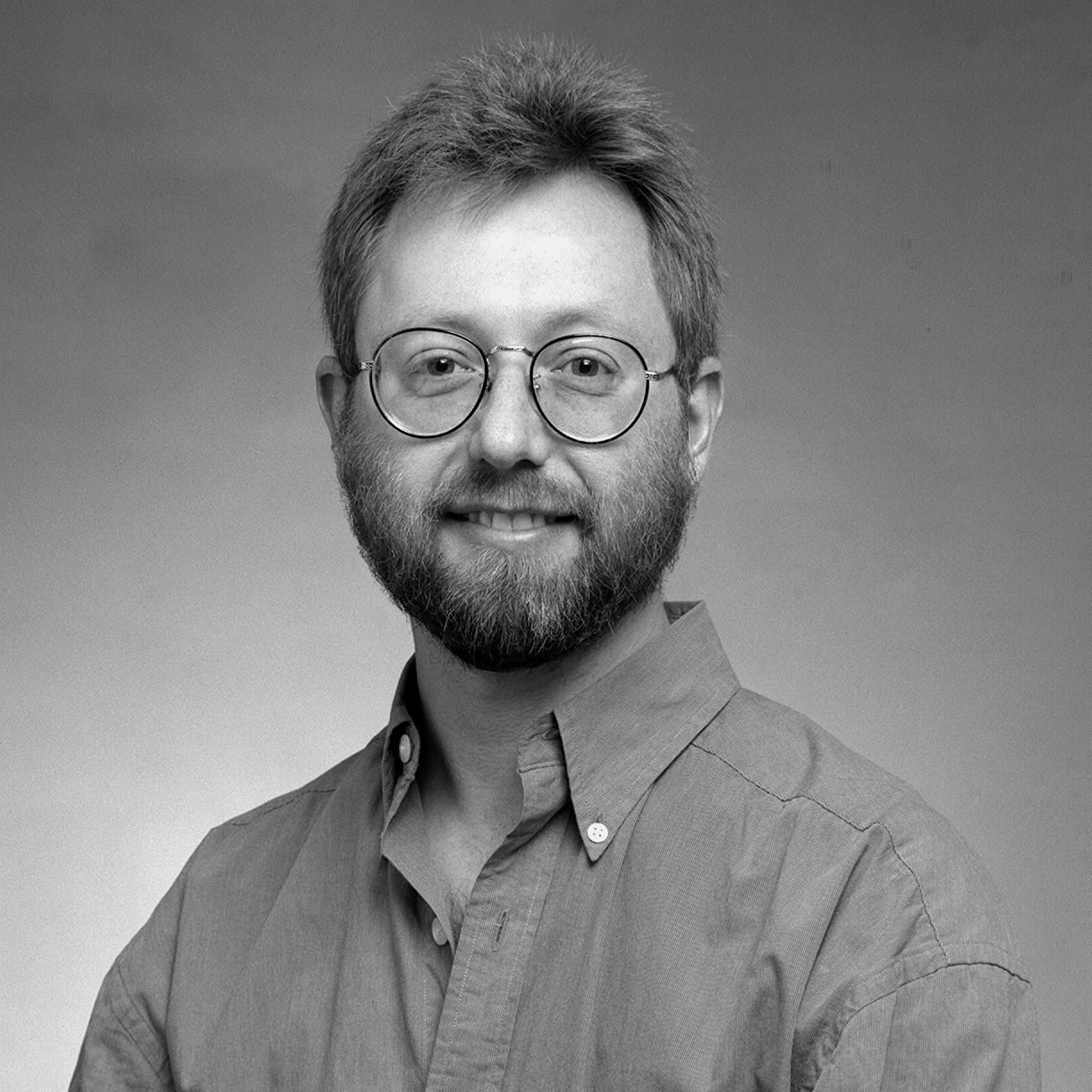
- Born: 1958 (age 67–68); Los Angeles, California, US
- Education: UCLA (BS, MS)
- Known for: Lead of the Sojourner Mars rover mission
- Scientific career
- Fields: Systems engineering, robotics
- Workplaces: NASA, Jet Propulsion Laboratory
- Website: Profile at JPL

Andrew Mishkin (born c. 1958) is an American engineer who currently serves as the senior systems engineer at the Jet Propulsion Laboratory, where he coordinated the development of various robotic vehicles and their subsystems for more than 15 years. He was on the Sojourner rover team at its formation, eventually becoming an uplink sequence planner as Sojourner explored Mars. In 1997, he received the NASA Exceptional Achievement Medal and was also selected as one of "The 35 People Who Made the Year" in the December issue of Vanity Fair magazine. He then was a Mission Operations System Development Manager on Mars Exploration Rover mission.

Mishkin grew up in West Los Angeles, graduated from University High School (Los Angeles, California), and then obtained a BS degree in Systems Engineering (man/machine systems) and an MS in Engineering (problem solving and decision making) from UCLA. He is a member of Sigma Xi, Tau Beta Pi and Phi Beta Kappa.

His wife, Sharon Laubach, was also an engineer on the Sojourner and MER missions, the former while a Caltech graduate student.
