= Sojourner (rover) =

First NASA Mars rover on Mars Pathfinder mission

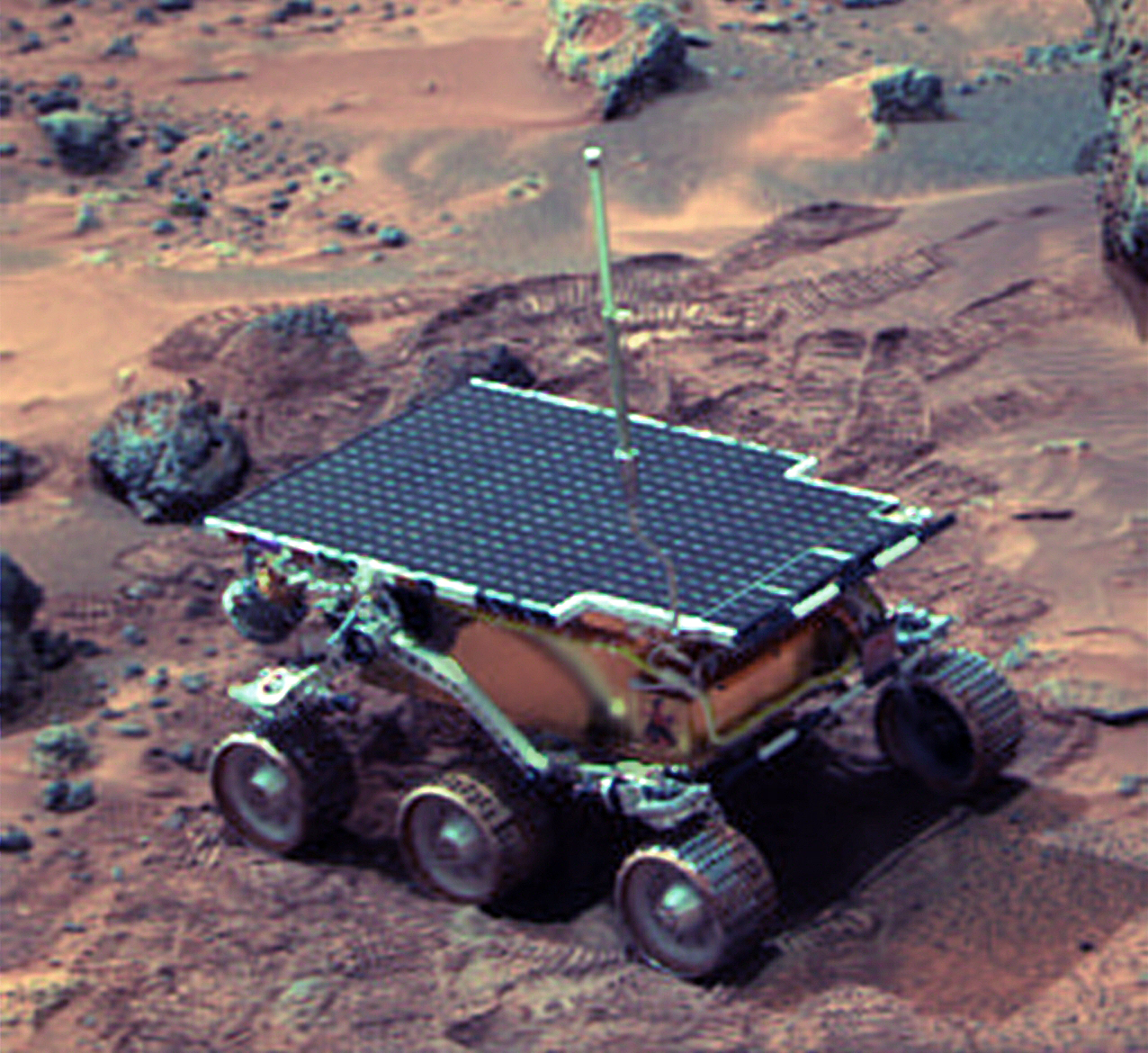
- Sojourner rover pictured by Pathfinder lander
- Mission type: Mars rover
- Operator: NASA
- Website: Official website
- Mission duration: Planned: 7 sols (7 days); Actual: 83 sols (85 days), landing to final contact

Spacecraft properties
- Dry mass: 11.5 kilograms (25 lb)
- Power: Solar panel: 13 W

Start of mission
- Launch date: December 4, 1996, 06:58:07 UTC
- Rocket: Delta II 7925 D240
- Launch site: Cape Canaveral LC-17B
- Contractor: McDonnell Douglas
- Deployed from: Mars Pathfinder
- Deployment date: July 5, 1997

End of mission
- Declared: March 10, 1998
- Last contact: September 27, 1997

Mars rover
- Landing date: July 4, 1997 16:56:55 UTC
- Landing site: Ares Vallis, Chryse Planitia; 19°7′48″N 33°13′12″W
- Distance driven: 100 metres (330 ft)
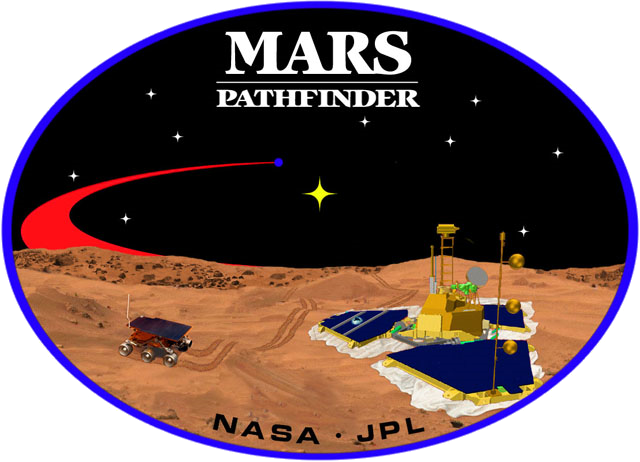
- Mars Pathfinder mission patch NASA Mars rovers

The Sojourner rover was a vehicle that reached Mars on July 4, 1997, as part of the Mars Pathfinder mission. Sojourner was operational on Mars for 92 sols (95 Earth days), and was the first wheeled vehicle to operate on an astronomical object other than the Earth or Moon. The landing site was in the Ares Vallis channel in the Chryse Planitia region of the Oxia Palus quadrangle.

The rover was equipped with front and rear cameras, and hardware that was used to conduct several scientific experiments. It was designed for a mission ending 8 sols, with a possible extension to 30 sols, and was active for 83 sols (85 Earth days). The rover communicated with Earth through the Pathfinder base station, which had its last successful communication session with Earth at 3:23 a.m. PDT on September 27, 1997. The last signal from the rover was received on the morning of October 7, 1997.

Sojourner traveled just over 100 meters (330 ft) by the time communication was lost. Its final confirmed command was to remain stationary until October 5, 1997, (sol 91) and then drive around the lander; there is no indication it was able to do so. The Sojourner mission formally ended on March 10, 1998, after all further options were exhausted.

== Mission ==
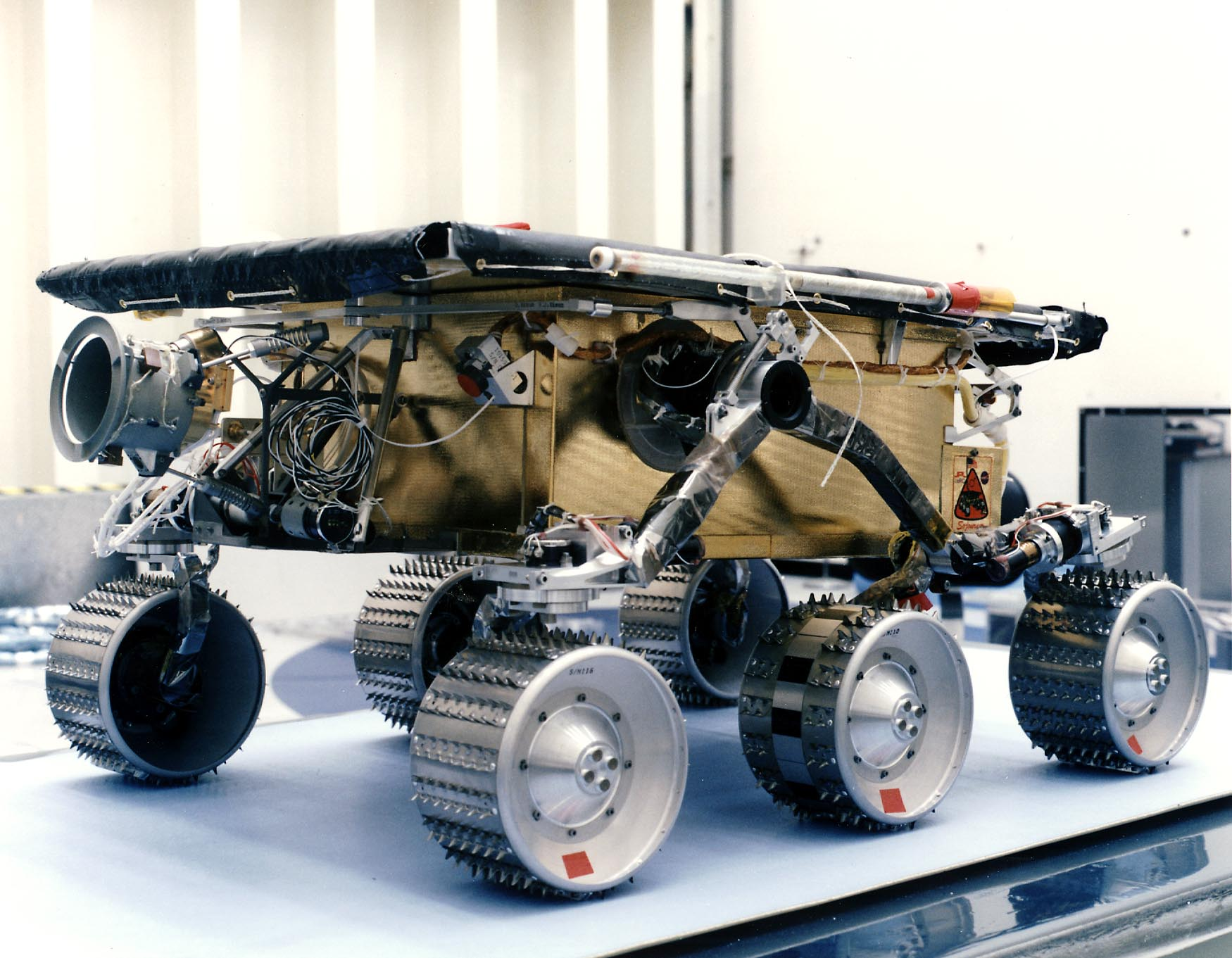
Sojourner at JPL

Sojourner was an experimental vehicle whose main mission was to test in the Martian environment technical solutions that were developed by engineers from different NASA research laboratories. It was necessary to verify whether the design strategy followed had resulted in the construction of a vehicle suitable for the environment it would encounter, despite the limited knowledge of it. Careful analysis of the operations on Mars would make it possible to develop solutions to critical problems identified and to introduce improvements for subsequent planetary exploration missions. One of the mission's main aims was to prove the "faster, better, cheaper" approach embraced by the NASA administration. Development took three years and cost under $150 million for the lander, and $25 million for the rover; development was faster and less costly than all previous missions.

These objectives required careful selection of the landing site to balance the technical requests with the scientific ones. A large plain was needed for the probe to land and rocky terrain to verify the rover's systems. The choice fell on Ares Vallis in Chryse Planitia, which is characterized by alluvial-looking rock formations. Scholars believed the analysis of the rocks, which lie in what appears to be the outlet of a huge drainage channel, could have confirmed the past presence of liquid water on the surface of Mars and provide details of the surrounding areas, from which the rocks were eroded.

== Technical characteristics ==
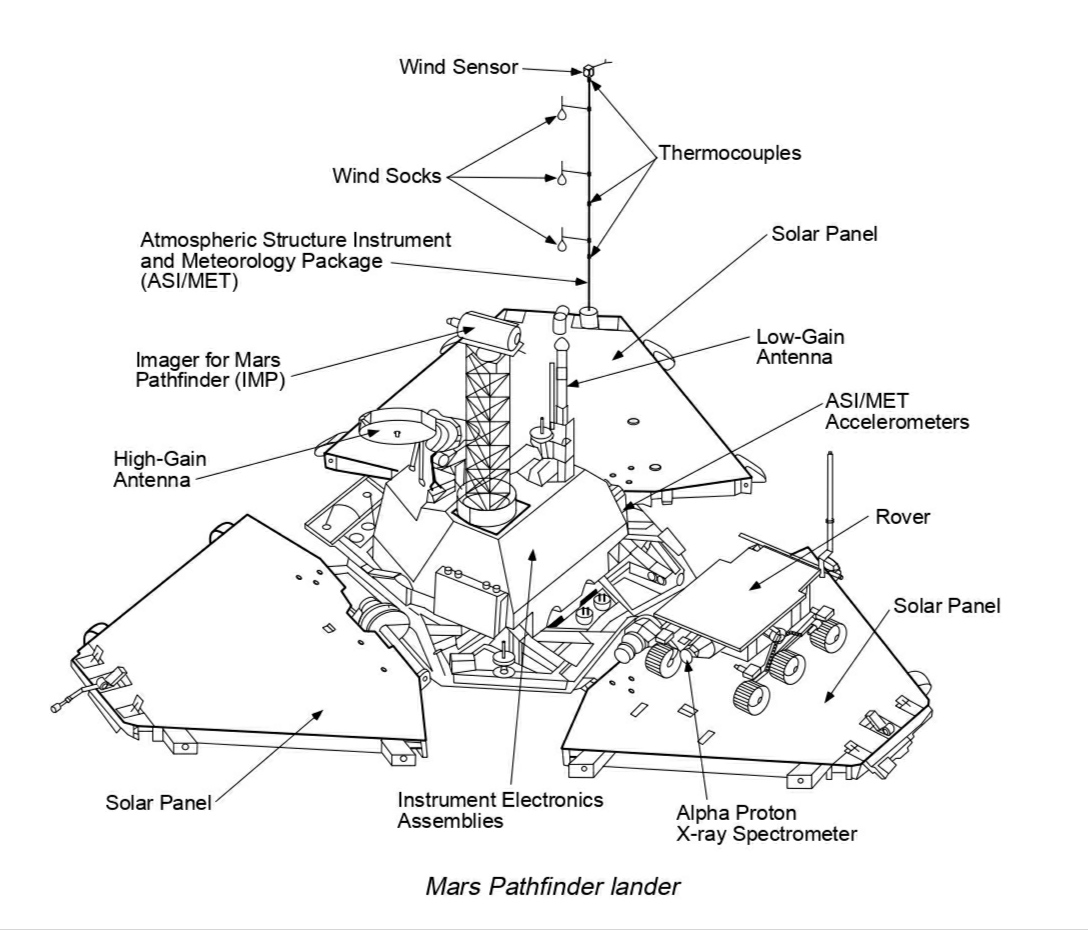
Schematic representation of the lander

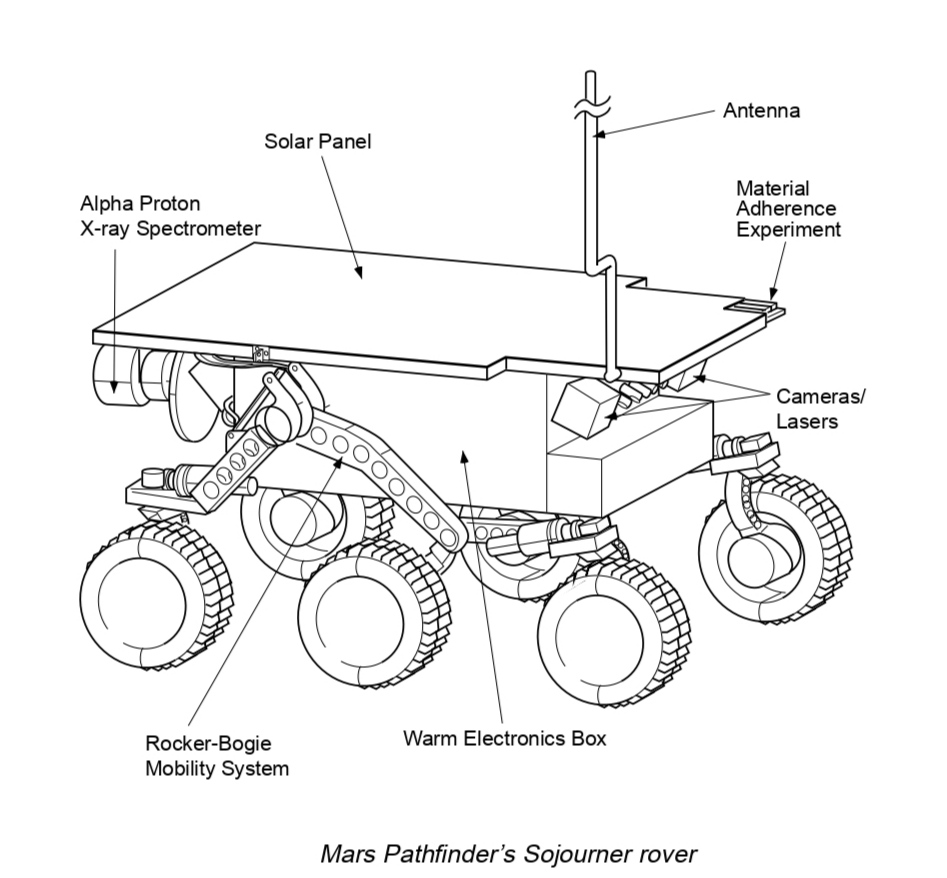
Schematic representation of the rover

Sojourner was developed by NASA's Jet Propulsion Laboratory (JPL). It is a six-wheeled, 65 cm (26-inch) long, 48 cm (19-inch) wide and 30 cm (12-inch) high vehicle. In the mission's cruise phase, it occupied an 18 cm (7.1-inch) high space and has a mass of 10.6 kilograms (23 lb). It was supported by a lander, a tetrahedron-shaped structure with a mass of 250 kg (550 lb), and had a camera, scientific instrumentation, three petals of solar panels, a meteorology mast, and 6 kg (13 lb) of equipment that was required to maintain communications between the rover and the lander. Hardware included a steerable, high-gain X-band antenna that could send approximately 5.5 kilobits per second into a 70 m (230 ft) Deep Space Network antenna, 3.3 m^{2} (36 sq ft) gallium-arsenide solar arrays that generated 1.1 kW⋅h/day and were capable of providing enough power to transmit for 2–4 hours per sol and maintain 128 megabytes of dynamic memory through the night.

=== Lander ===
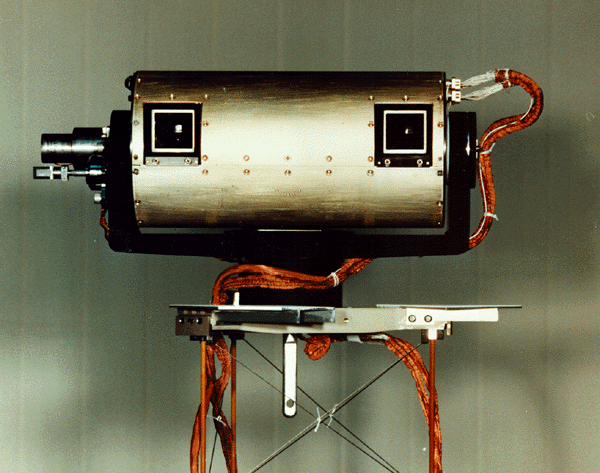
Lander's IMP camera, see also diagram of the IMP.

One of the lander's main tasks was to support the rover by imaging its operations and sending data from the rover to Earth. The lander had rechargeable batteries and over 2.5 m (8.2 ft) of solar cells on its petals. The lander contained a stereoscopic camera with spatial filters on an expandable pole called Imager for Mars Pathfinder (IMP), and the Atmospheric Structure Instrument/Meteorology Package (ASI/MET) which acted as a Mars meteorological station, collecting data about pressure, temperature, and winds. The MET structure included three windsocks mounted at three heights on a pole, the topmost at about one meter (3.3 ft) and generally registered winds from the west. To provide continuous data, the IMP imaged the windsocks once every daylight hour. These measurements allowed the eolian processes at the landing site, including the particle threshold and the aerodynamic surface roughness, to be measured.

The square eyes of the IMP camera are separated by 15 cm (5.9 in) to provide stereoscopic vision and ranging performance to support rover operations. The dual optical paths are folded by two sets of mirrors to bring the light to a single charge-coupled device (CCD). To minimize moving parts, the IMP is electronically shuttered; half of the CCD is masked and used as a readout zone for the electronic shutter. The optics had an effective pixel resolution of one milliradian per pixel which gives 1 mm (0.039 in) per pixel at a range of one meter (3.3 ft). The camera cylinder is mounted on gimbals that provide rotation freedom of 360° in azimuth and −67° to +90° in elevation. This assembly is supported by an extendible mast that was designed and built by AEC Able Engineering. The mast holds the camera at approximately 1.5 m (4.9 ft) above the Martian surface and extends Pathfinder's horizon to 3.4 km (2.1 miles) on a featureless plane.

=== Power system ===
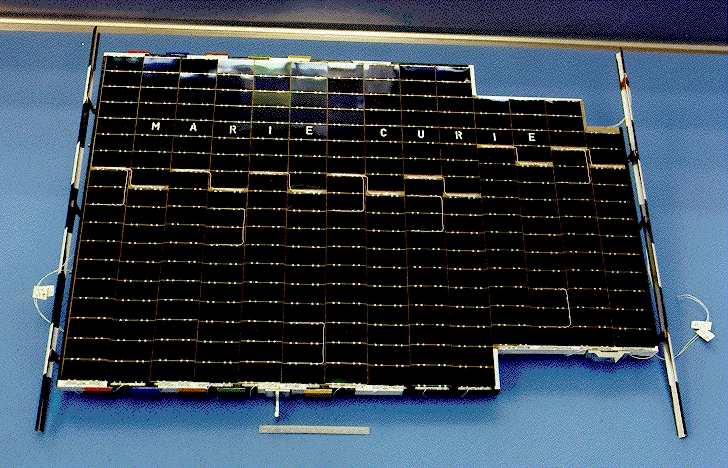
Solar panels of the spare rover, Marie Curie. See also batteries installed on the rover.

Sojourner had solar panels and a non-rechargeable lithium-thionyl chloride (LiSOCl_{2}) battery that could provide 150 watt-hours and allowed limited nocturnal operations. Once the batteries were depleted, the rover could only operate during the day. The batteries also allowed the rover's health to be checked while enclosed in the cruise stage while en route to Mars. The rover had 0.22 m^{2} (2.4 sq ft) of solar cells, which could produce a maximum of about 15 watts on Mars, depending on conditions. The cells were GaAs/Ge (Gallium Arsenide/Germanium) with approximately 18 percent efficiency. They could survive temperatures down to about −140 °C (−220 °F). After about its 40th sol on Mars, the lander's battery no longer held a charge so it was decided to shut off the rover before sunset and wake it up at sunrise.

=== Locomotion system ===
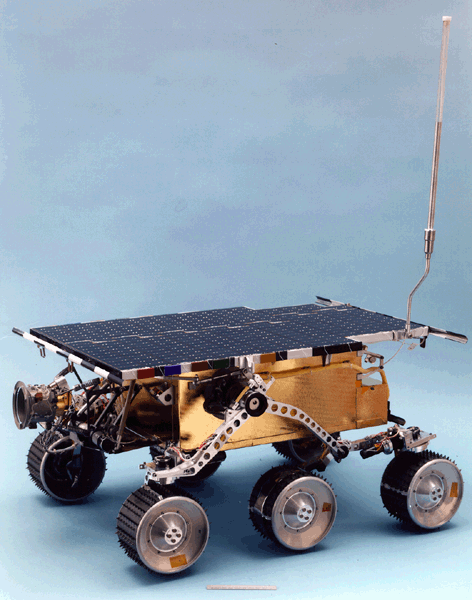
Side view

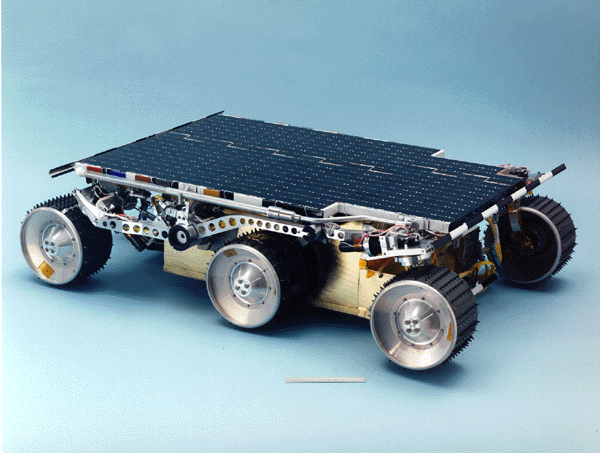
Rover in the cruise configuration

The rover's wheels were made of aluminum and were 13 cm (5.1 in) in diameter and 7.9 cm (3.1 in) wide. They had serrated, stainless steel tracks that could generate a pressure of 1.65 kPa (0.239 psi) in optimal conditions on soft ground. No such need arose during the operational phase. Each wheel was driven by its own independent motor. The first and third wheels were used for steering. A six-wheel-steering configuration was considered, but this was too heavy. As the rover rotated on itself, it drew a 74 cm (29 in) wide circle.

The wheels were connected to the frame through specially developed suspension to ensure all six were in contact with the ground, even on rough terrain. JPL engineer Donald B. Bickler developed this rocker-bogie suspension for the experimental "Rocky" vehicles, of which the Sojourner is the eighth version. They consisted of two elements; "Bogie" connected the front wheel with the central one and "Rocker" connected the rear wheel with the other two. The system did not include springs or other elastic elements, which could have increased the pressure exerted by each wheel. This system allowed the overcoming of obstacles up to 8 cm (3.1 in) high but theoretically would have allowed the rover to overcome obstacles of 20 cm (7.9 in), or about 30% of the rover's length. The suspension system was also given the ability to collapse on itself so the rover would occupy 18 cm (7.1 in) in the cruising configuration.

The locomotion system was found to be suitable for the environment of Mars—being very stable, and allowing forward and backward movements with similar ease—and was adopted with appropriate precautions in the subsequent Spirit and Opportunity rover missions.

In the ten-year development phase that led to the realization of Sojourner, alternative solutions that could take advantage of the long experience gained at JPL in the development of vehicles for the Moon and Mars were examined. The use of four or more legs was excluded for three reasons: a low number of legs would limit the rover's movements and the freedom of action, and increasing the number would lead to a significant increase in complexity. Proceeding in this configuration would also require knowledge of the space in front—the ground corresponding to the next step—leading to further difficulties. The choice of a wheeled vehicle solved most of the stability problems, led to a reduction in weight, and improved efficiency and control compared to the previous solution. The simplest configuration was a four-wheel system that, however, encounters difficulties in overcoming obstacles. Better solutions were the use of six or eight wheels with the rear ones able to push, allowing the obstacle to be overcome. The lighter, simpler, six-wheeled option was preferred.

The rover could travel 500 m (1,600 ft) from the lander—the approximate limit of its communication range— and had a maximum speed of 1 cm/s (0.39 in/s).

=== Hardware and software ===
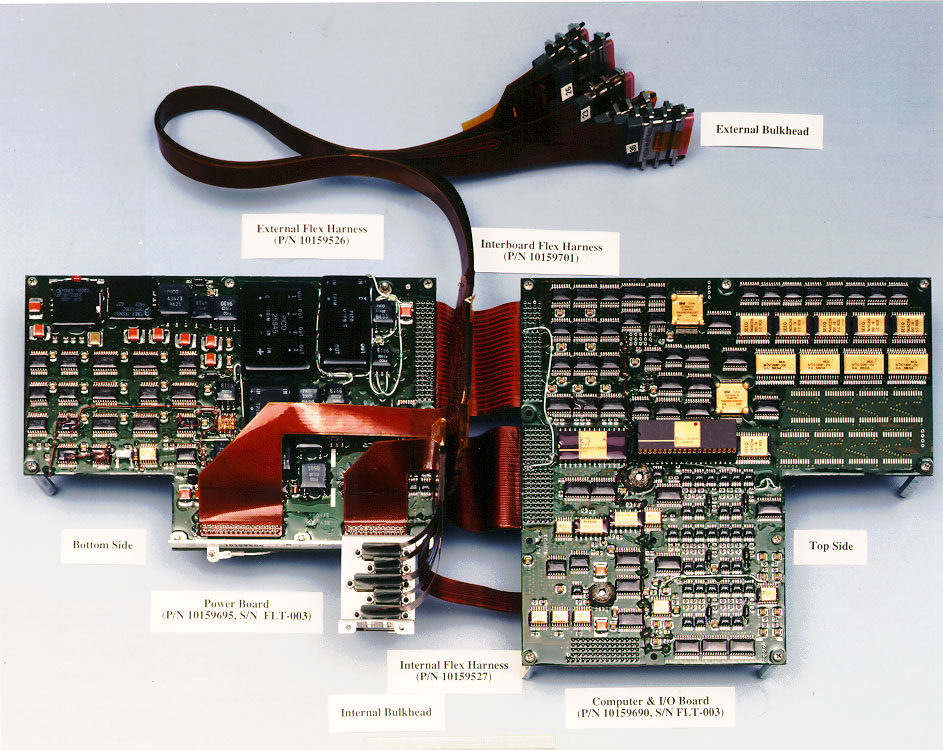
Power board (bottom side) and CPU board (top side)

Sojourner's central processing unit (CPU) was an Intel 80C85 with a 2 MHz clock, addressing 64 kilobytes (Kb) of memory, and running a cyclic executive. It had four memory stores; 64 Kb of RAM made by IBM for the main processor, 16 Kb of radiation-hardened PROM made by Harris, 176 Kb of non-volatile storage made by Seeq Technology, and 512 Kb of temporary data storage made by Micron. The electronics were housed inside the rover's warm electronics box (WEB). The WEB is a box-like structure formed from fiberglass facesheets bonded to aluminum spars. The gaps between facesheets were filled with blocks of aerogel that worked as thermal insulation. The aerogel used on the Sojourner had a density of approximately 20 mg/cc. This insulator was designed to trap heat generated by rover's electronics; this trapped heat soaked at night through the passive insulation maintaining the electronics in the WEB at between −40 and 40 °C (−40 and 104 °F), while externally the rover experienced a temperature range between 0 and −110 °C (32 and −166 °F).

The Pathfinder lander's computer was a Radiation Hardened IBM Risc 6000 Single Chip with a Rad6000 SC CPU, 128 megabytes (Mb) of RAM and 6 Mb of EEPROM memory, and its operating system was VxWorks.

The mission was jeopardised by a concurrent software bug in the lander that had been found in preflight testing but was deemed a glitch and given a low priority because it only occurred in certain unanticipated heavy-load conditions, and the focus was on verifying the entry and landing code. The problem, which was reproduced and corrected from Earth using a laboratory duplicate, was due to computer resets caused by priority inversion. No scientific or engineering data was lost after a computer reset but all of the following operations were interrupted until the next day. Resets occurred on July 5, 10, 11 and 14 during the mission before the software was patched on July 21 to enable priority inheritance.

=== Communication and cameras ===
Sojourner communicated with its base station using a 9,600 baud radio modem, although error-checking protocols limited communications to a functional rate of 2,400 baud with a theoretical range of about one-half kilometre (0.31 miles). Under normal operation, it would periodically send a "heartbeat" message to the lander. If no response was given, the rover could autonomously return to the location at which the last heartbeat was received. If desired, the same strategy could be used to deliberately extend the rover's operational range beyond that of its radio transceiver, although the rover rarely traveled further than 10 meters (33 ft) from Pathfinder during its mission. The Ultra high frequency (UHF) radio modems operated in half-duplex mode, meaning they could either send or receive data but not both at the same time. The data was communicated in bursts of 2 kB.

The rover was imaged on Mars by the base station's IMP camera system, which also helped determine where the rover should go. The rover had two monochrome cameras in front and a color camera at the rear. Each front camera had an array 484 pixels high by 768 wide. The cameras used CCDs manufactured by Eastman Kodak Company; they were clocked out by CPU, and capable of auto-exposure, Block Truncation Coding (BTC) data compression, bad pixel/column handling, and image data packetizing.

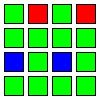
Pixel map of the color camera

Both front cameras were coupled with five laser stripe projectors that enabled stereoscopic images to be taken along with measurements for hazard detection in the rover's path. The optics consisted of a window, lens, and field flattener. The window was made of sapphire while the lens objective and flattener were made of zinc selenide.

Another color camera was located on the back of the rover near the APXS, and rotated by 90°. It provided images of the APXS's target area and the rover's ground tracks.

The sensor of this color camera was arranged so 12 of 16 pixels of a 4×4 pixel block were sensitive to green light; while 2 pixels were sensitive to red light and the other 2 were sensitive to infrared and blue light.

Because the rover's cameras had zinc-selenide lenses, which block light with a wavelength shorter than 500 nanometers (nm), no blue light actually reached the blue-and-infrared-sensitive pixels, which therefore recorded only infrared light.

=== Rover Control Software ===
Sojourner operation was supported by "Rover Control Software" (RCS) that ran on a Silicon Graphics Onyx2 computer on Earth and allowed command sequences to be generated using a graphical interface. The rover driver would wear 3D goggles supplied with imagery from the base station and would move a virtual model with a specialized joystick. The control software allowed the rover and surrounding terrain to be viewed from any angle, supporting the study of terrain features, the placing of waypoints, and virtual flyovers. Darts were used as icons to show where the rover should go. Desired locations were added to a sequence and sent to the rover to perform. Typically, a long sequence of commands were composed and sent once a day. The rover drivers were Brian K. Cooper and Jack Morrison.

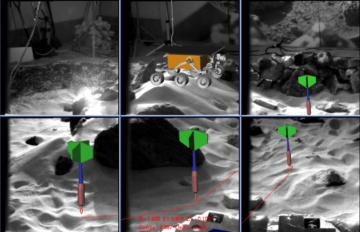
Example of a screen that visualized the surface of Mars, used by rover driver

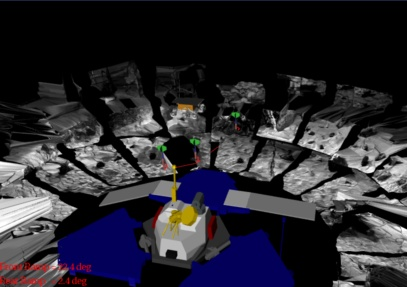
Example of "virtual reality" interface that allowed driver to see the surface from any angle around the rover

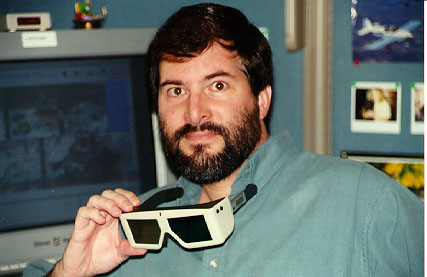
Brian K. Cooper, primary rover driver, with a pair of stereo goggles

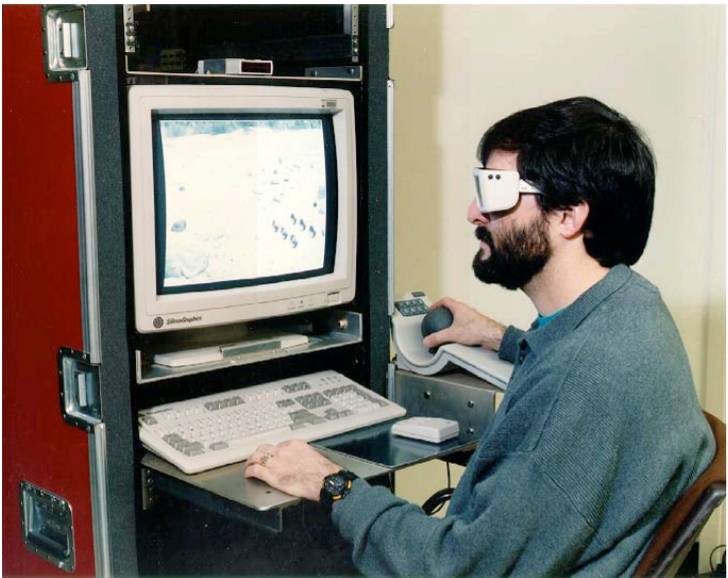
Cooper in stereo goggles working with RCS

== Science payload ==
=== Alpha Proton X-Ray Spectrometer ===
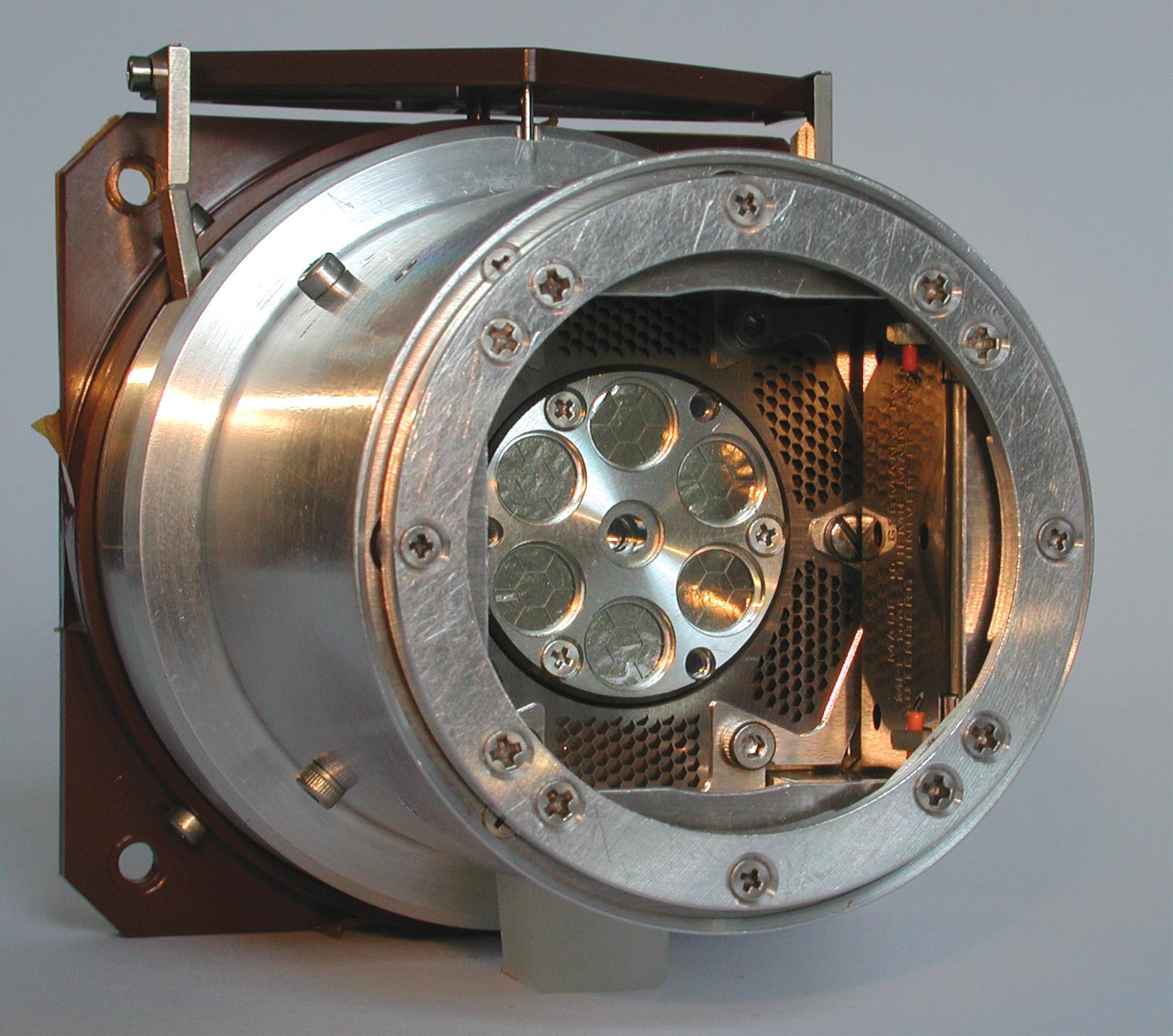
Alpha particle X-ray spectrometer

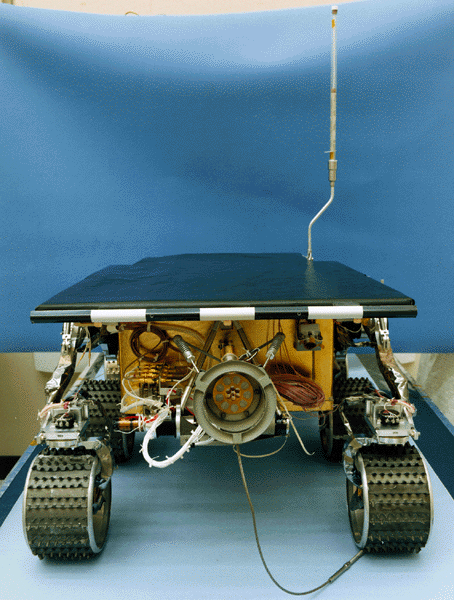
APXS at the back of the rover

The Alpha Proton X-Ray Spectrometer (APXS) was designed to determine the chemical composition of Martian soil, rocks and dust by analyzing the return radiation in its alpha, proton, and X-ray components resulting from the sample's exposure to a radioactive source contained in the instrument. The instrument had a curium-244 source that emits alpha particles with an energy of 5.8 MeV and a half-life of 18.1 years. A portion of the incident radiation that impacted the analyzed sample's surface was reflected and the remainder interacted with the sample.

The principle of the APXS technique is based on the interaction of alpha particles from a radioisotope source with matter. There are three components of the return radiation; simple Rutherford backscattering, production of protons from reactions with the nucleus of light elements, and generation of X-rays upon recombination of atomic shell vacancies created by alpha particle bombardment by interaction with the electrons of the innermost orbitals. The instrument was designed to detect the energy of all three components of the return radiation, making it possible to identify the atoms present and their quantities in a few tens of micrometers below the surface of the analyzed sample. The detection process was rather slow; each measurement could take up to ten hours.

Sensitivity and selectivity depends on a channel; alpha backscattering has high sensitivity for light elements like carbon and oxygen, proton emission is mainly sensitive to sodium, magnesium, aluminium, silicon, sulfur, and X-ray emission is more sensitive to heavier elements sodium to iron and beyond. Combining all three measurements makes APXS sensitive to all elements with the exception of hydrogen that is present at concentration levels above a fraction of one percent. The instrument was designed for the failed Russian Mars-96 mission. The alpha particle and proton detectors were provided by the Chemistry Department of the Max Planck Institute and the X-ray detector was developed by the University of Chicago.

During each measurement, the front surface of the instrument had to be in contact with the sample. For this to be possible, the APXS was mounted on a robotic arm called the Alpha-Proton-X-ray Spectrometer Deployment Mechanism (ADM). The ADM was an anthropomorphic actuator that was equipped with a wrist that was capable of rotations of ±25°. The dual mobility of the rover and the ADM increased the potential of the instrument—the first of its kind to reach Mars.

=== Wheel Abrasion Experiment ===
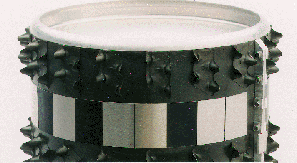
The wheel affected by the Wheel Abrasion Experiment.

The Wheel Abrasion Experiment (WAE) was designed to measure the abrasive action of Martian soil on thin layers of aluminum, nickel, and platinum, and thus deduce the grain size of the soil at the landing site. For this purpose, 15 layers—five of each metal—were mounted on one of the two central wheels with a thickness between 200 and 1000 ångström, and electrically isolated from the rest of the rover. By directing the wheel appropriately, sunlight was reflected towards a nearby photovoltaic sensor. The collected signal was analyzed to determine the desired information. For the abrasive action to be significant on the mission schedule, the rover was scheduled to stop at frequent intervals and, with the other five wheels braked, force the WAE wheel to rotate, causing increased wear. Following the WAE experiment on Mars, attempts were made to reproduce the effects observed in the laboratory.

The interpretation of the results proposed by Ferguson et al. suggests the soil at the landing site is made up of fine-grained dust of limited hardness with a grain size of less than 40 μm. The instrument was developed, built and directed by the Lewis' Photovoltaics and Space Environments Branch of the Glenn Research Center.

=== Materials Adherence Experiment ===
The Materials Adherence Experiment (MAE) was designed by engineers at the Glenn Research Center to measure the daily accumulation of dust on the back of the rover and the reduction in the energy-conversion capacity of the photovoltaic panels. It consisted of two sensors.

The first was composed of a photovoltaic cell covered by transparent glass that could be removed on command. Near local midday, measurements of the cell's energy yield were made, both with the glass in place and removed. From the comparison, it was possible to deduce the reduction in cell yield caused by the dust. Results from the first cell were compared with those of a second photovoltaic cell that was exposed to the Martian environment. The second sensor used a quartz crystal microbalance (QCM) to measure the weight-per-surface unit of the dust deposited on the sensor.

During the mission, a daily rate equal to 0.28% of percentage reduction in the energy efficiency of the photovoltaic cells was recorded. This was independent of whether the rover was stationary or in motion. This suggests the dust settling on the rover was suspended in the atmosphere and was not raised by the rover's movements.

== Control system ==
Sojourner overcomes a height difference.

Since it was established transmissions relating to driving the Sojourner would occur once every sol, the rover was equipped with a computerized control system to guide its movements independently.

A series of commands had been programmed, providing an appropriate strategy for overcoming obstacles. One of the primary commands was "Go to Waypoint". A local reference system, of which the lander was the origin, was envisaged. Coordinate directions were fixed at the moment of landing, taking the direction of north as a reference. During the communication session (once per sol), the rover received from Earth a command string containing the coordinates of the arrival point, which it would have to reach autonomously.

The algorithm implemented on the on-board computer attempted, as a first option, to reach the obstacle in a straight line from the starting position. Using a system of photographic objectives and laser emitters, the rover could identify obstacles along this path. The on-board computer was programmed to search for the signal produced by the lasers in the cameras' images. In the case of a flat surface and no obstacles, the position of this signal was unchanged with respect to the reference signal stored in the computer; any deviation from this position made it possible to identify the type of obstacle. The photographic scan was performed after each advance equal to the diameter of the wheels, 13 cm (5.1 in), and before each turn.

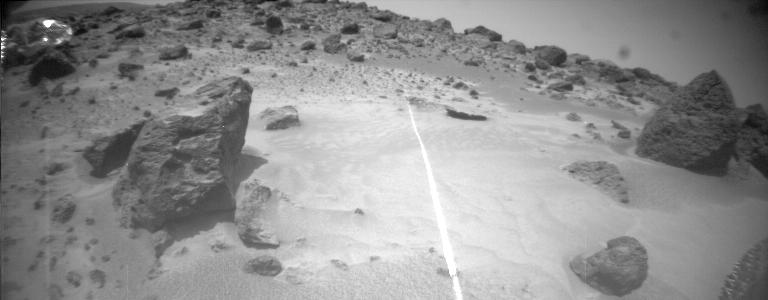
One of the obstacle detection images taken by Sojourner. The laser trace is clearly visible.

In the confirmed presence of an obstacle, (Note: It was foreseen the possibility that three false positives out of twenty detections carried out before proceeding) the computer commanded the execution of a first strategy to avoid it. The rover, still by itself, rotated until the obstacle was no longer in sight. Then, after having advanced for half of its length, it recalculated a new straight path that would lead it to the point of arrival. At the end of the procedure, the computer had no memory of the existence of the obstacle. The steering angle of the wheels was controlled through potentiometers.

In particularly uneven terrain, the procedure described above would have been prevented by the presence of a large number of obstacles. There was, therefore, a second procedure known as "thread the needle", which consisted of proceeding between two obstacles along the bisector between them, providing they were sufficiently spaced to allow the rover to pass. If the rover had encountered a clearing before reaching a predetermined distance, it would have had to rotate on itself to calculate a new straight trajectory to reach the target. Conversely, the rover would have had to go back and try a different trajectory. As a last resort, contact sensors were mounted on the front and rear surfaces of the rover.

To facilitate the rover's direction, an appropriate on-the-spot rotation could be commanded from Earth. The command was "Turn" and was performed using a gyroscope. Three accelerometers measured the acceleration of gravity along three perpendicular directions, making it possible to measure the surface's slope. The rover was programmed to deviate from routes that would require a slope greater than 30°, though it was designed not to tip over when tilted at 45°. The distance traveled was determined by the number of revolutions of the wheels.

== Marie Curie ==
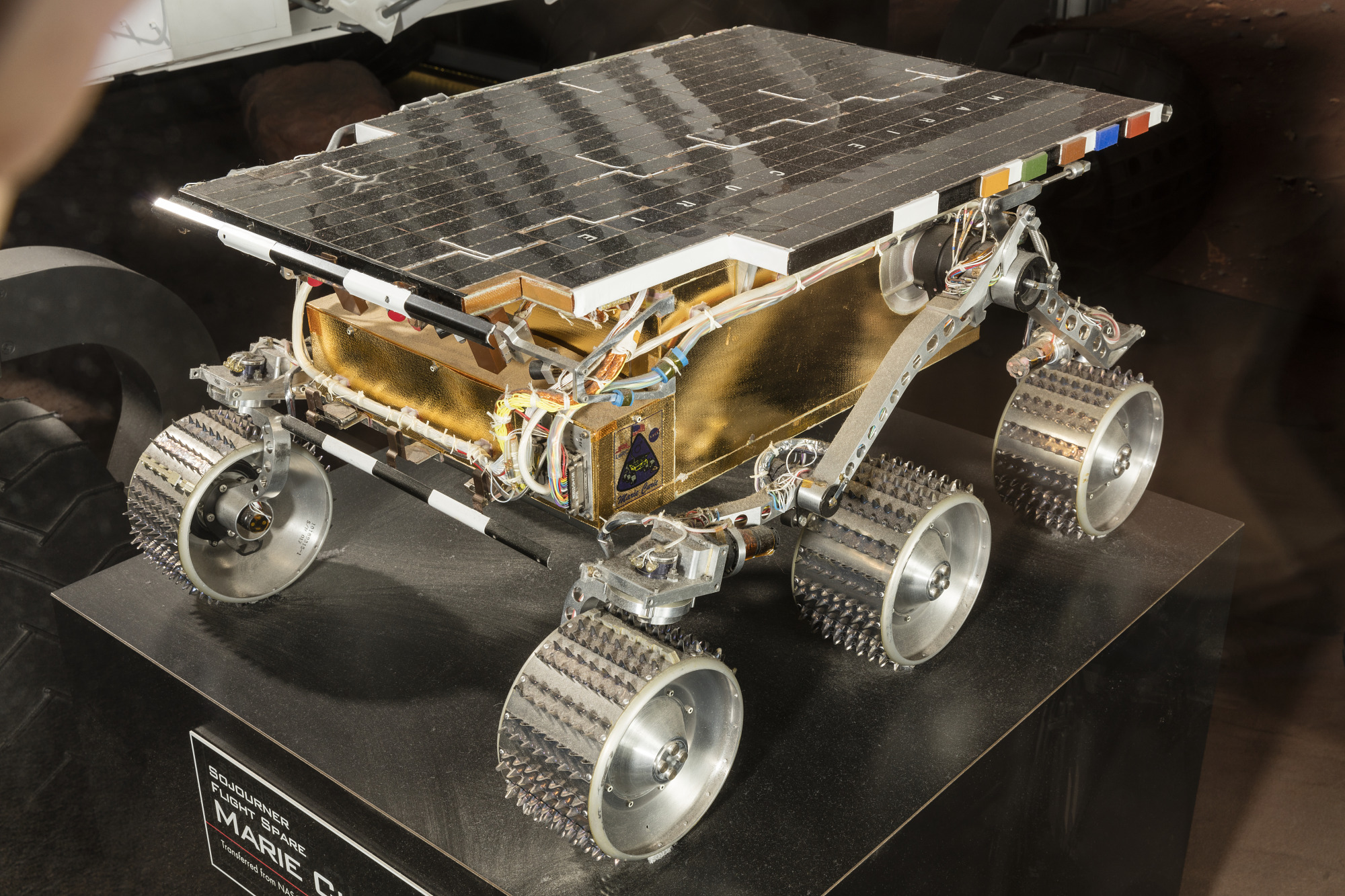
Marie Curie in the museum (see also from other angles: 1, 2, 3)

Marie Curie, named after Nobel Prize winner Marie Curie, is a flight spare for the Sojourner. During the operational phase on Mars, the sequences of the most complex commands to be sent to Sojourner were verified on this identical rover at JPL. NASA planned to send Marie Curie on the canceled Mars Surveyor 2001 mission; it was suggested to send it in 2003, proposing Marie Curie to be deployed "using a robotic-arm attached to the lander". Rather than this, the Mars Exploration Rover program was launched in 2003. In 2015, JPL transferred Marie Curie to the National Air and Space Museum (NASM) of the Smithsonian Institution.

According to space historian and NASM curator Matt Shindell:

The Marie Curie rover was a fully operational unit, I’m not sure at what point it was decided which was going to fly and which one would stay home, but it was ready to replace the main unit at a moment’s notice.

== Mars Yard ==
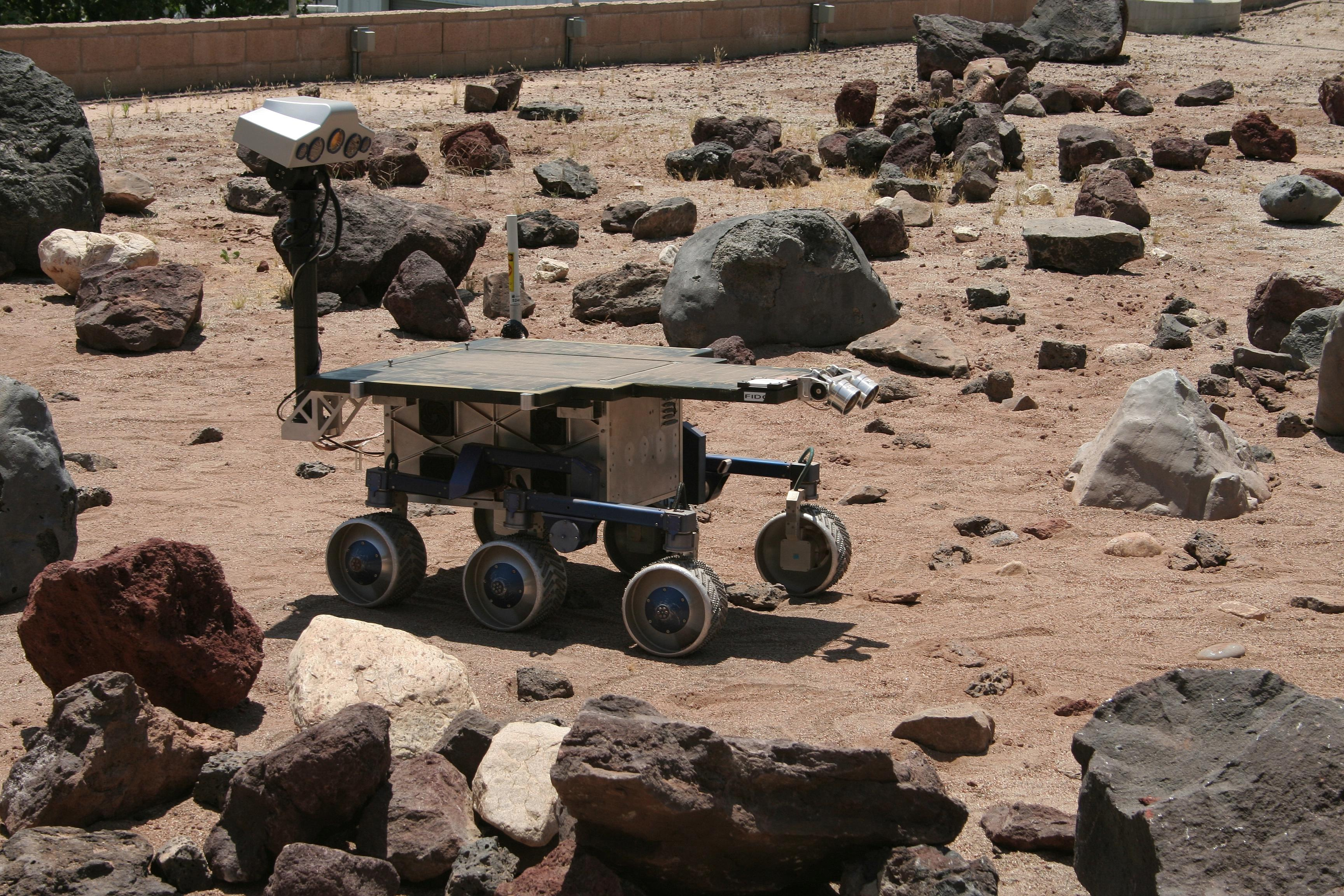
Sojourner test model at the Mars Yard

To test robotic prototypes and applications under natural lighting conditions, JPL built a simulated Martian landscape called "Mars Yard". The test area measured 21 by 22 m (69 by 72 ft) and had a variety of terrain arrangements to support multiple test conditions. The soil was a combination of beach sand, decomposed granite, brick dust, and volcanic cinders. The rocks were several types of basalts, including fine-grained and vesicular in both red and black. Rock-size distributions were selected to match those seen on Mars and the soil characteristics matched those found in some Martian regions. Large rocks were not Mars-like in composition, being less dense and easier to move for testing. Other obstacles such as bricks and trenches were often used for specialized testing. Mars Yard was expanded in 1998 and then in 2007 to support other Mars rover missions.

== Naming ==
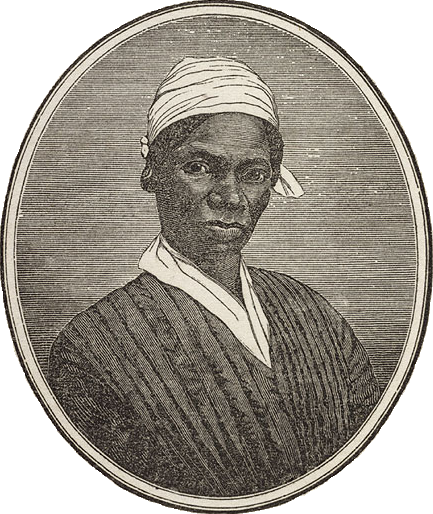
Sojourner Truth

The name "Sojourner" was chosen for the rover through a competition held in March 1994 by the Planetary Society in collaboration with JPL; it ran for one year and was open to students of 18 years and below from any country. Participants were invited to choose a "heroine to whom to dedicate the rover" and to write an essay about her accomplishments, and how these accomplishments could be applied to the Martian environment. The initiative was publicized in the United States through the January 1995 edition of the magazine Science and Children published by the National Science Teachers Association.

Some 3,500 papers were received from countries including Canada, India, Israel, Japan, Mexico, Poland, Russia, and the United States, of which 1,700 were from students aged between 5 and 18. The winners were chosen on the basis of the quality and creativity of the work, the appropriateness of the name for a Martian rover, and the competitor's knowledge of the heroine and the probe mission. The winning paper was written by 12-year-old Valerie Ambroise of Bridgeport, Connecticut, who suggested dedicating the rover to Sojourner Truth, a Civil War era African-American abolitionist and women's rights advocate. The second place went to Deepti Rohatgi, 18, of Rockville, Maryland, who proposed Marie Curie, a Nobel Prize-winning Polish-French chemist. Third place went to Adam Sheedy, 16, of Round Rock, Texas, who chose Judith Resnik, a United States astronaut and Space Shuttle crew member who died in the 1986 Challenger disaster. The rover was also known as Microrover Flight Experiment abbreviated MFEX.

== Operations ==
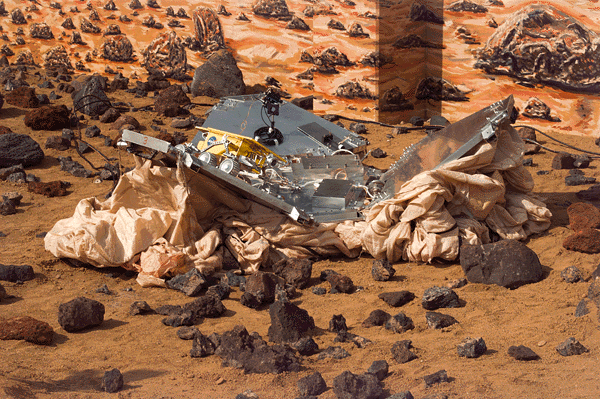
Position of the rover on the lander after opening of the petals.

Sojourner was launched on December 4, 1996, aboard a Delta II booster, and reached Mars on July 4, 1997. It operated in Ares Vallis channel in the Chryse Planitia of the Oxia Palus quadrangle, from July 5 to September 27, 1997, when the lander cut off communications with Earth. In the 83 sols of activity—twelve times the expected duration for the rover—Sojourner traveled 104 m (341 ft), always remaining within 12 m (39 ft) of the lander. It collected 550 images, performed 16 analyzes through the APXS—nine of rocks and the remainder of the soil— and performed 11 Wheel Abrasion Experiments and 14 experiments on soil mechanics in cooperation with the lander.

=== Landing site ===
The landing site for the rover was chosen in April 1994 at the Lunar and Planetary Institute in Houston. The landing site is an ancient flood plain called Ares Vallis, which is located in Mars's northern hemisphere and is one of the rockiest parts of Mars. It was chosen because it was thought to be a relatively safe surface on which to land and one that contains a wide variety of rocks that were deposited during a flood. This area was well-known, having been photographed by the Viking mission. After a successful landing, the lander was officially named "The Carl Sagan Memorial Station" in honor of the astronomer.

=== Deployment ===
Mars Pathfinder landed on July 4, 1997. The petals were deployed 87 minutes later with Sojourner rover and the solar panels attached on the inside. The rover exited the lander on the next day.

=== Rock analysis ===
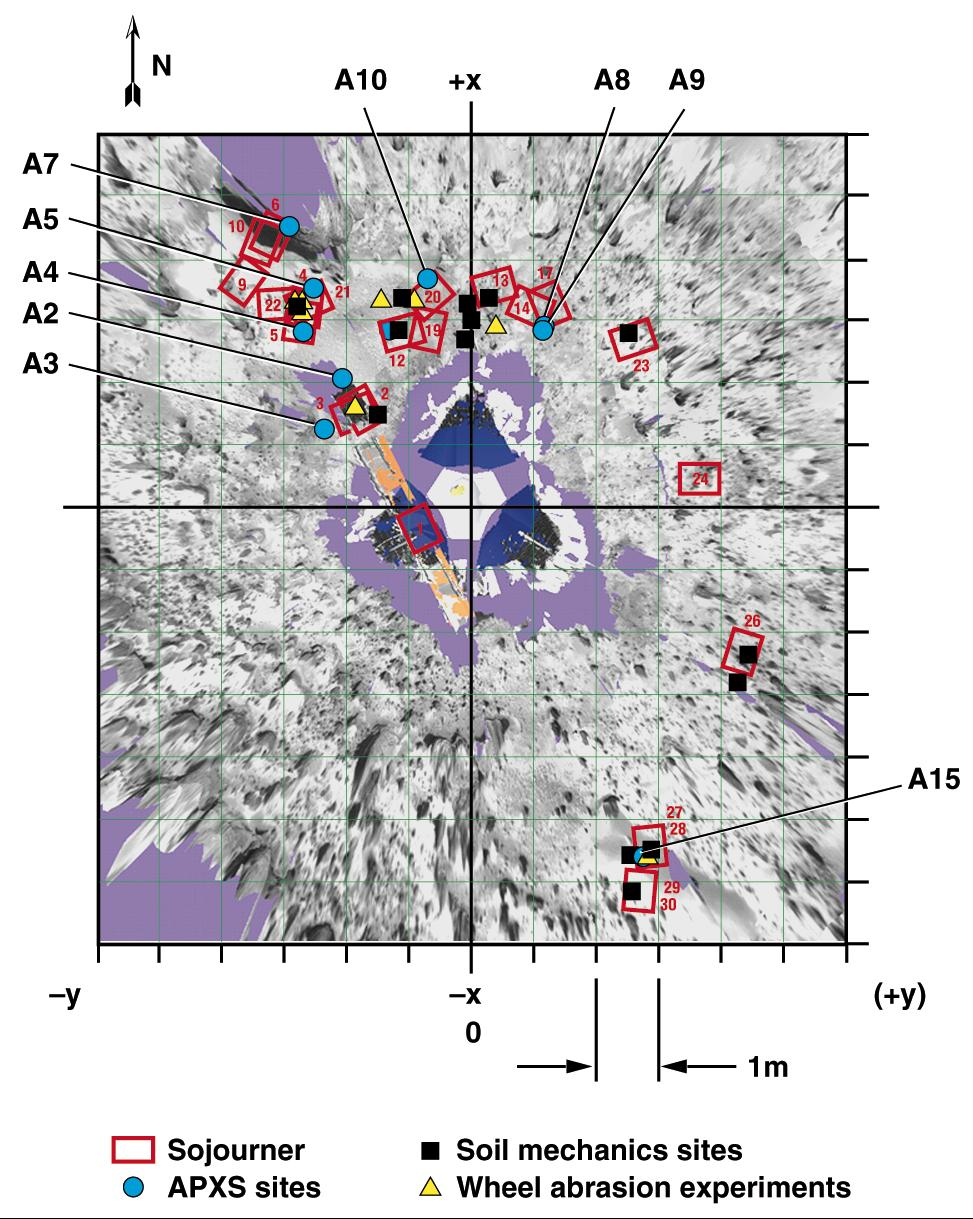
Overhead view of the area surrounding the lander illustrating the rover traverse. Red rectangles are rover positions at the end of sols 1–30. Locations of soil mechanics and wheel abrasion experiments, and APXS measurements are shown.

The rocks at the landing site were given names of cartoon characters. Among them were Pop Tart, Ender, mini-Matterhorn, Wedge, Baker's Bench, Scooby Doo, Yogi, Barnacle Bill, Pooh Bear, Piglet, the Lamb, the Shark, Ginger, Souffle, Casper, Moe, and Stimpy. A dune was called Mermaid Dune, and a pair of hills were named Twin Peaks.

The first analysis was carried out on the rock called "Barnacle Bill" during the third sol. The rock's composition was determined by the APXS spectrometer, which took 10 hours for a complete scan. The rock "Yogi" was analyzed on the 10th sol. It has been suggested the conformation of the land close to the rock, even visually at a lower level than the surrounding surface, was derived from the evaporation of floodwater.

Both rocks turned out to be andesites; this finding surprised some scholars because andesites are formed by geological processes that require an interaction between materials of the crust and the mantle. A lack of information on the surrounding highlands made it impossible to grasp all of the implications of the discovery.

The rover was then directed to the next target and on the 14th sol, it analyzed the rock named "Scooby-Doo" and imaged the "Casper" rock. Both were deemed to be consolidated deposits. The rock called "Moe" showed evidence of wind erosion. Most of the rocks analyzed showed a high silicon content. In a region nicknamed "Rock Garden", the rover encountered crescent-moon-shaped dunes that are similar to dunes on earth.

The landing site is rich in varied rocks, some of which are clearly volcanic in origin, such as "Yogi"; others are conglomerates, the origins of which are the subject of several proposals. In one hypothesis, they formed in the presence of water in Mars's distant past. In support of this, high silicon contents would be detected. This could also be a consequence of sedimentation processes; rounded rocks of various sizes were discovered and the valley's shapes are compatible with a river channel environment. Smaller, more rounded stones may also have been generated during a surface impact event.

When the mission's final results were described in a series of articles in the journal Science (December 5, 1997), it was believed the rock Yogi had a coating of dust but was similar to the rock Barnacle Bill. Calculations suggested both rocks mostly contain orthopyroxene (magnesium-iron silicate), feldspars (aluminum silicates of potassium, sodium, and calcium), and quartz (silicon dioxide) with smaller amounts of magnetite, ilmenite, iron sulfide, and calcium phosphate.

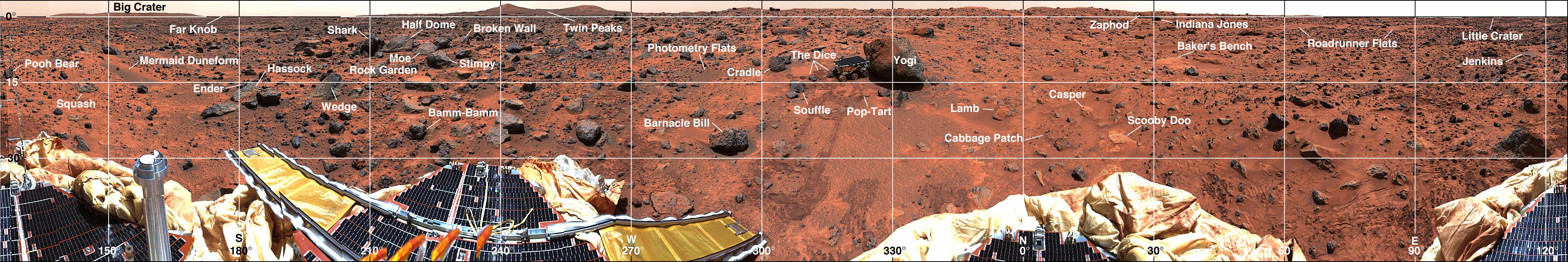
Annotated panorama of rocks near the rover (December 5, 1997)

== Sojourner in popular culture ==
Screenshot from The Martian, depicting the protagonist Mark Watney with Pathfinder lander and Sojourner rover.

- In the 2000 film Red Planet, the crew of the first mission to Mars survives the crash-landing of their entry vehicle. Their communications equipment is destroyed so they cannot contact their recovery vehicle in orbit. To re-establish contact before being presumed dead and left behind on Mars, the crew goes to the site of the Pathfinder rover, from which they salvage parts to make a basic radio.
- In the opening titles of the 2001 Star Trek: Enterprise, Sojourner is shown lying dormant and covered in dust. Another scene shows a plaque marking the landing site of the rover on board the Carl Sagan Memorial Station. In the episode "Terra Prime", Sojourner is briefly seen on the surface of Mars as a monument.
- In Andy Weir's 2011 novel The Martian, and the 2015 film based on it, the protagonist Mark Watney is stranded on Mars. Mark recovers the Pathfinder lander and uses it to contact Earth. For the movie, the lander and rover were re-created with the help of JPL. Production designer Arthur Max, who worked on the film, said they "have a fully practical working Pathfinder, which we use throughout the movie." In the movie, Mark Watney is later seen in his Mars outpost, the Ares III Hab, with the Sojourner roving around.

== Awards and honors ==
- On October 21, 1997, at the Geological Society of America's annual meeting in Salt Lake City, Utah, Sojourner was awarded honorary membership in the Society's Planetary Geology Division.
- In November 1997, to commemorate the achievements of Mars Pathfinder program, a $3 Priority Mail stamp was issued. Fifteen million stamps were printed. The stamp is based on the first image received from the Mars Pathfinder after its landing on the Martian surface July 4, 1997, which shows the Sojourner rover resting on the Pathfinder with a panoramic view of the Ares Vallis region in the background. The stamp's reverse bears text about the Pathfinder mission.
- Sojourner was included in the Robot Hall of Fame by Carnegie Mellon University.
- Perseverance rover, which landed in 2021, has a simplified representation of all previous NASA Martian rovers, starting with Sojourner, on one of its external plates.

== Key personnel ==
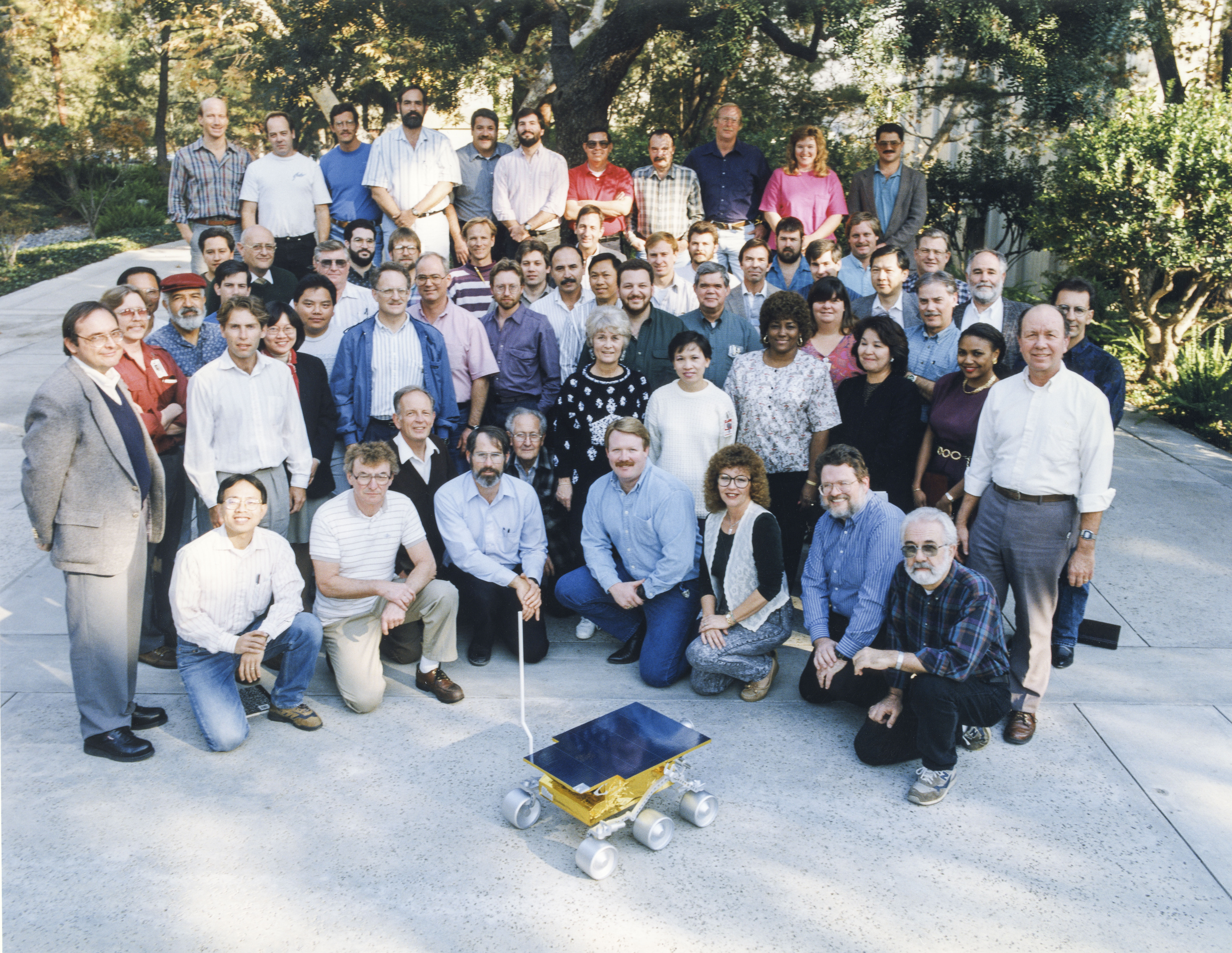
The Rover Team, 1994

The development of the rover and its instruments as well as its guidance during operations on Mars were done by a group of engineers from NASA, collectively referred to as "The Rover Team". The key personnel were:

- Project Manager: Tony Spear, JPL
- Microrover Flight Experiment Manager: Jacob Matijevic, JPL
- Chief Engineer, Microrover Flight Experiment: William Layman, JPL
- Assembly and Lead Test Engineer, Microrover Flight Experiment, Allen Sirota, JPL
- Microrover Mission Operations Engineer: Andrew Mishkin, JPL
- IMP Principal investigator: Peter H. Smith, University of Arizona
- ASI/MET Facility Instrument Science Team Leader: John T. Schofield, JPL
- ASI/MET Chief Engineer: Clayton LaBaw, JPL
- APXS Principal investigator: Rudolf Rieder, Max-Planck Institute, Department of Chemistry, Mainz, Germany
- Wheel Abrasion Experiment, Principal investigators: D. Ferguson and J. Kolecki, NASA Lewis Research Center
- Material Adherence Experiment, Principal investigators: G. Landis and P. Jenkins, NASA Lewis Research Center
- Manager of the Mars Exploration Program at JPL: Donna Shirley

== Gallery ==
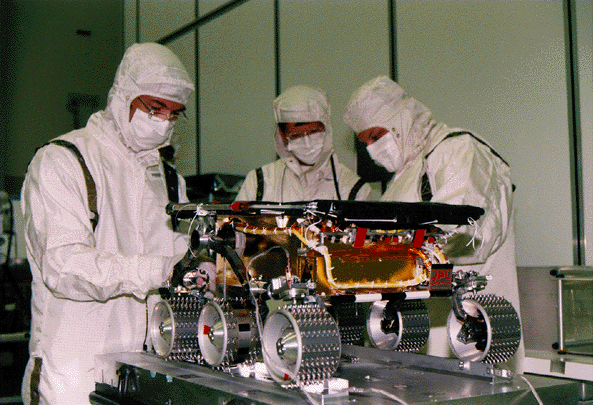
Sojourner in the production phase.

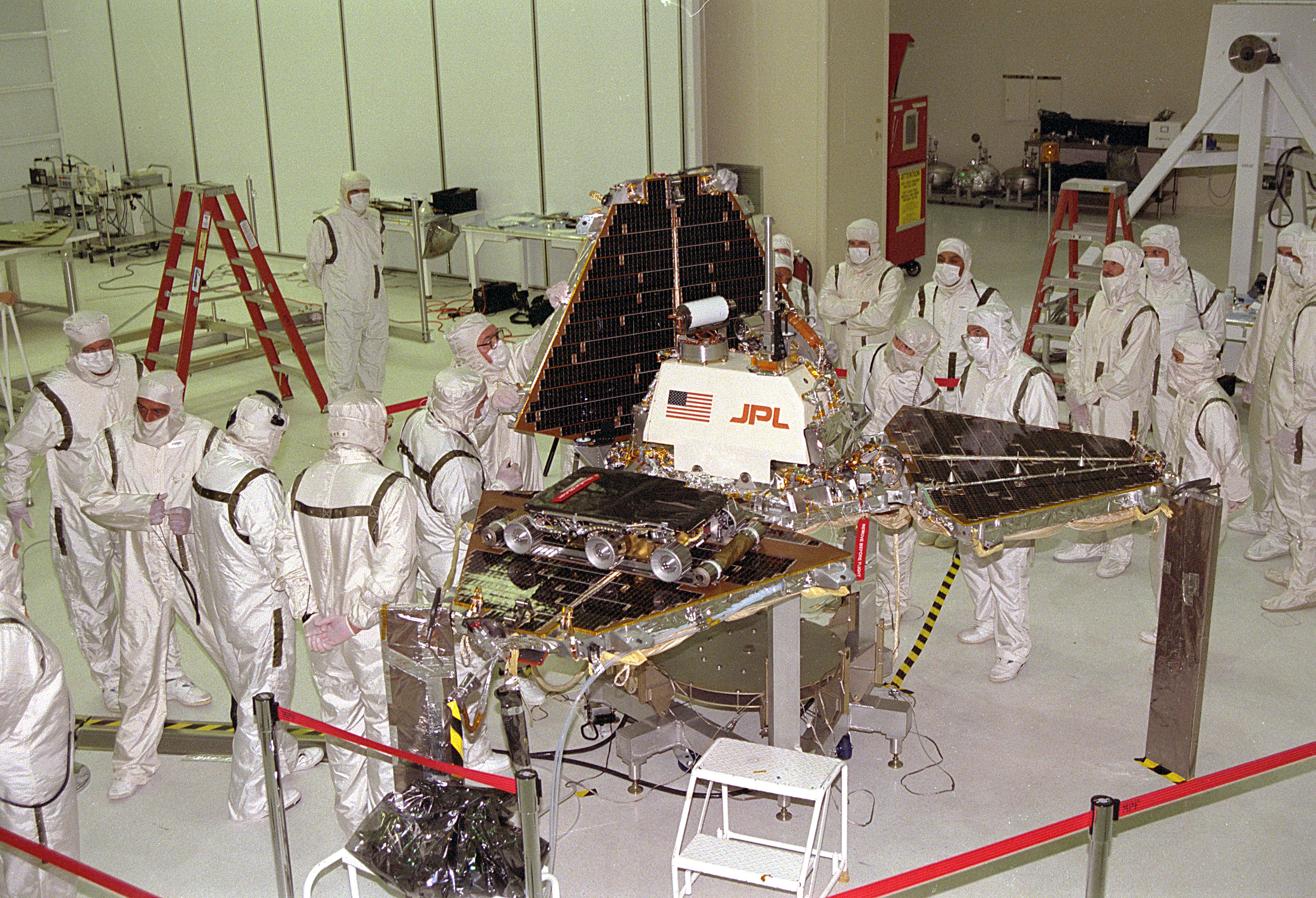
Pathfinder and Sojourner at JPL in October 1996, being 'folded' into its launch position.

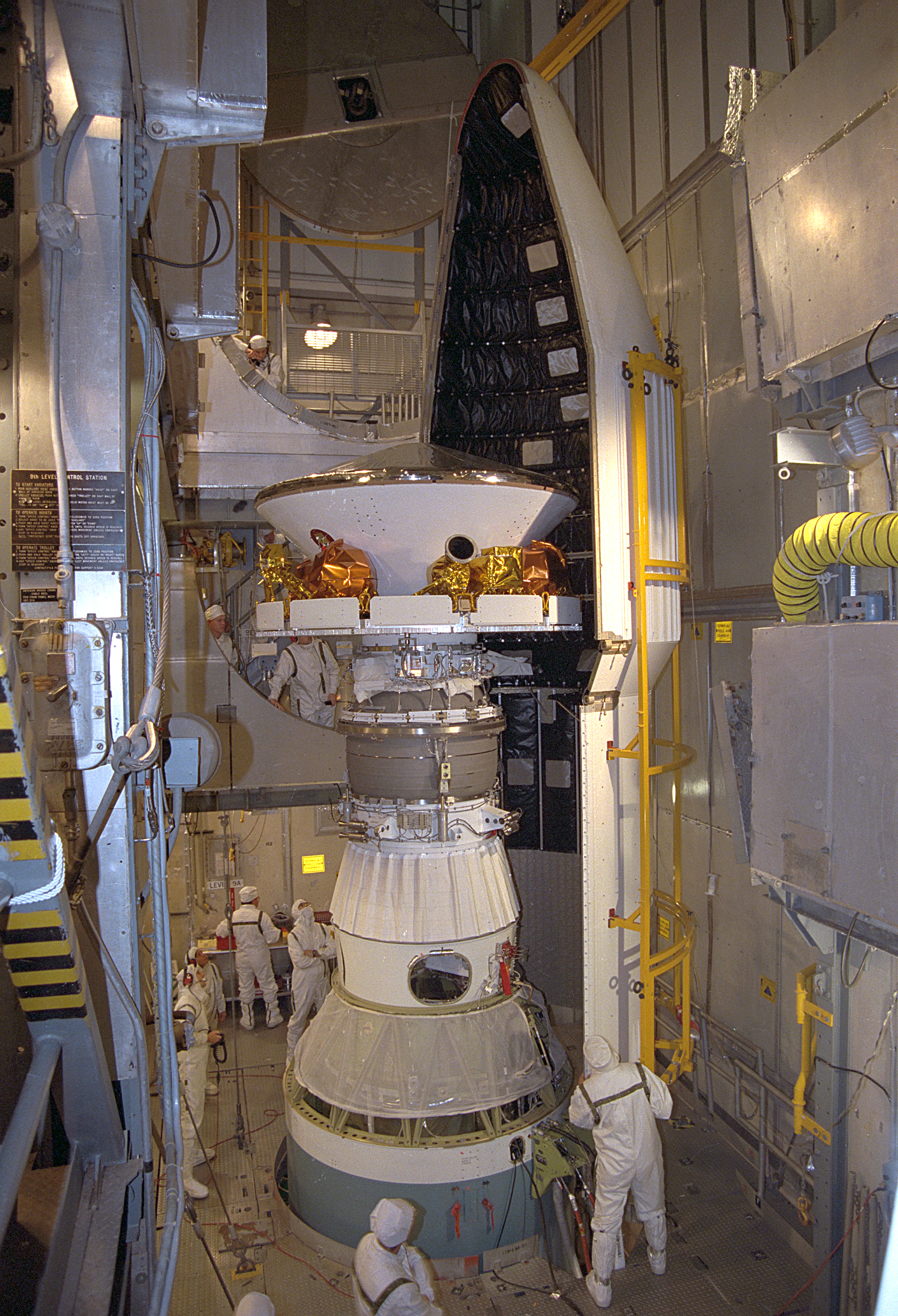
Mars Pathfinder loading into a rocket.
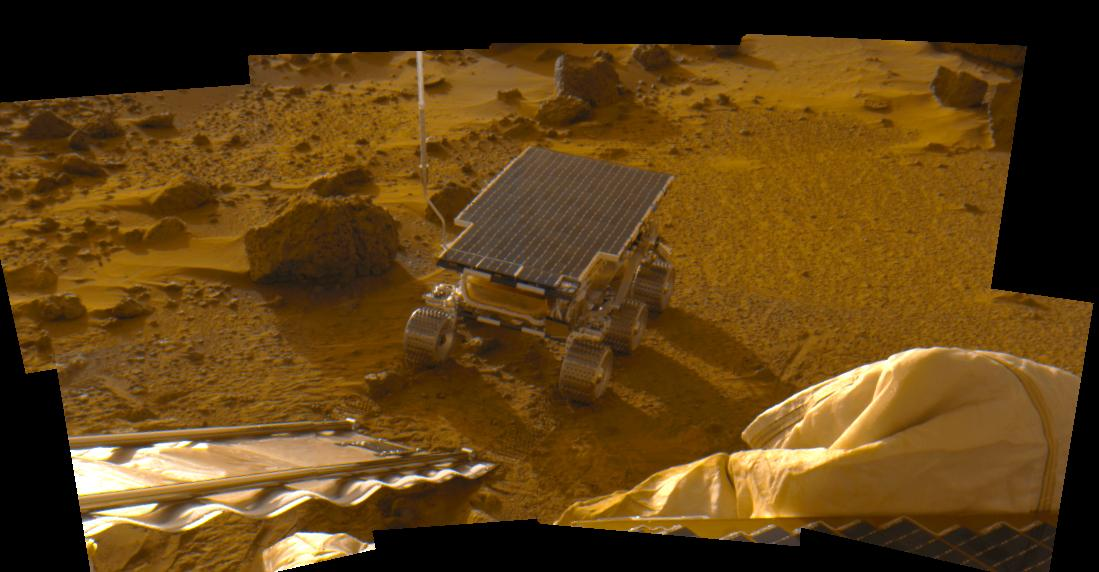
The sol 2 "insurance panorama" of Sojourner, taken on 530, 600, and 750 nm filters. (Note: Image was taken by IMP before the mast was deployed. It was called "insurance panorama", because if something went wrong during deployment, the team would still have a panorama of the landing site. Once the mast was deployed the height of the IMP was constant.)

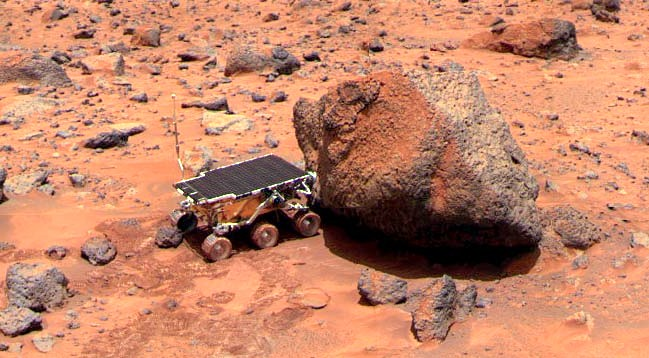
Sojourner performs spectrometer measurements on the "Yogi" rock.

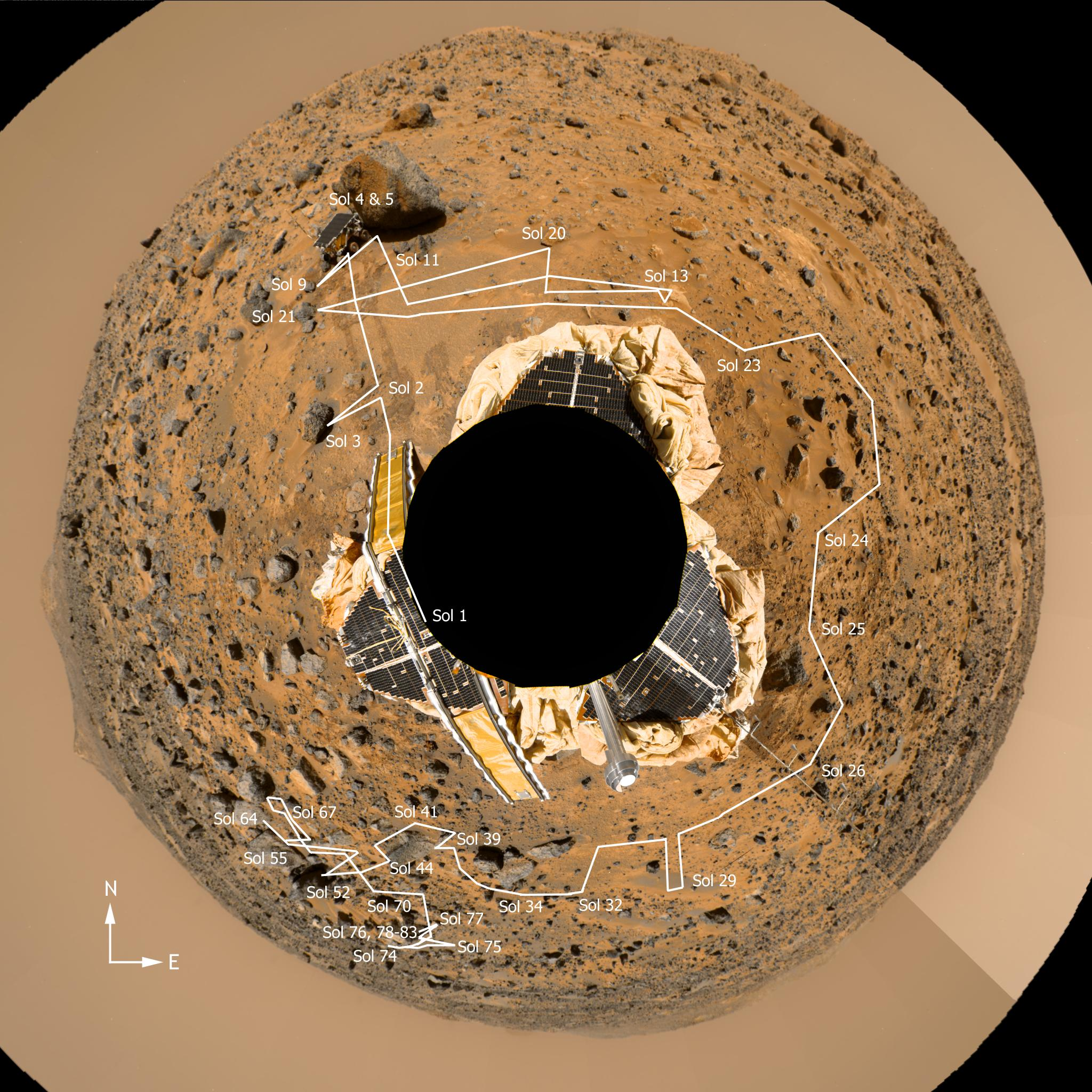
Route of the rover projected on an image taken by the lander.

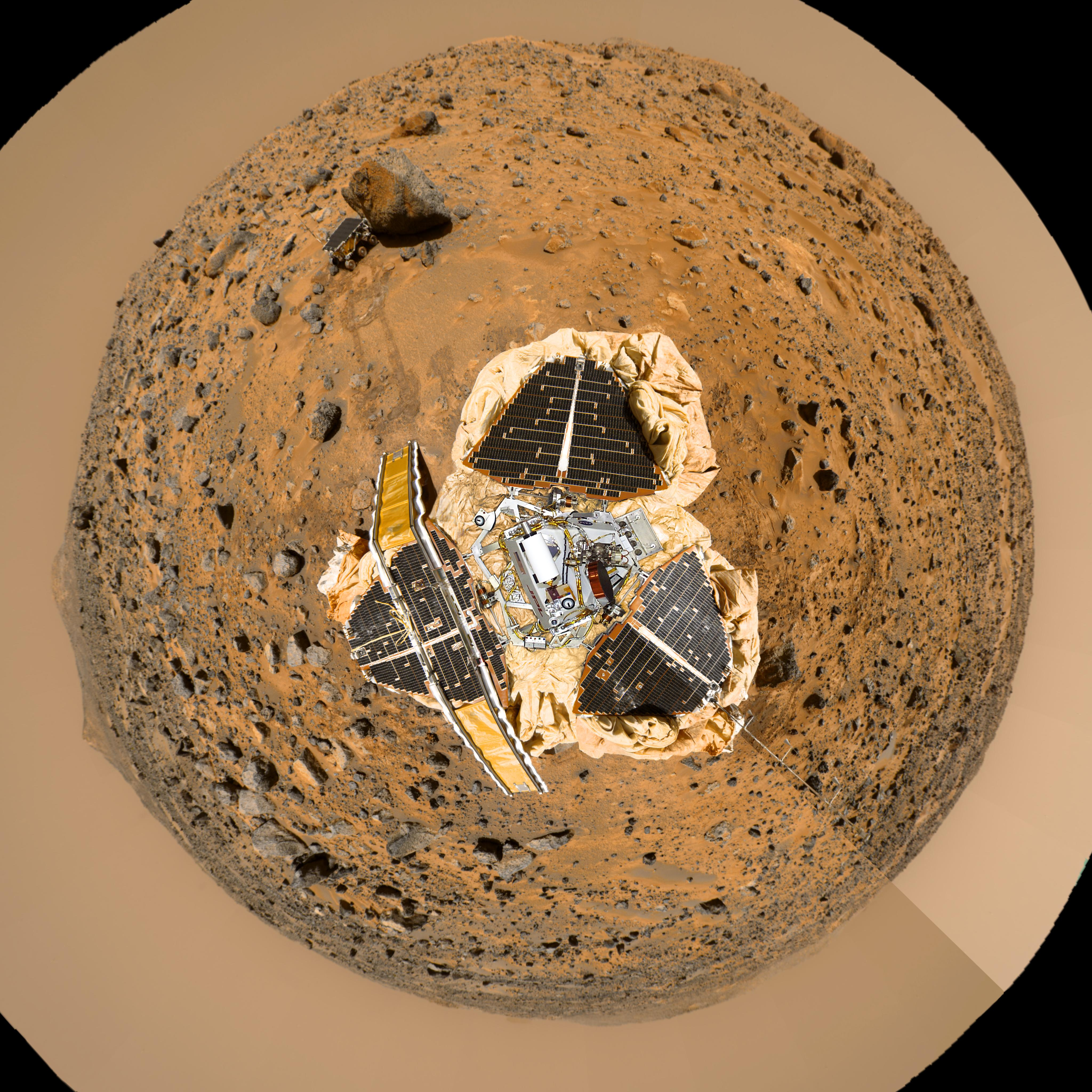
Mosaic of the lander and the rover from above, color has been enhanced to improve contrast in features, and is derived from IMP spectral filters 5, 9 and 0.

Rover near Yogi, sol 10.
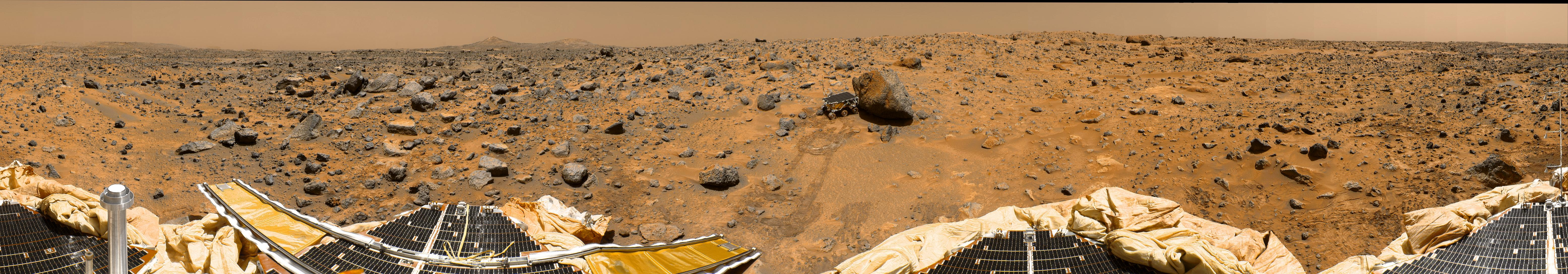
Mars Pathfinder panorama of landing site taken by lander's camera (IMP)
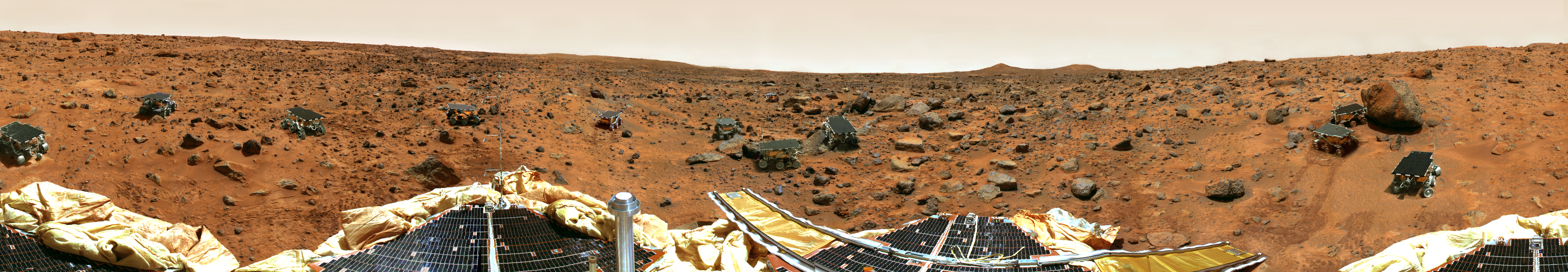
Various images of the Sojourner shot by the lander have been composited into the 360 degree Presidential Panorama. Since the camera's position was consistent, it is thus possible to see these images of the rover in the context of the entire landscape. This provides a visual scale for understanding the sizes and distances of rocks surrounding the lander as well as a record of the travels of the rover. Several of the rover images were captured in full color. The rest were colorized using color sampled from those frames.

=== Comparison to later Mars rovers ===
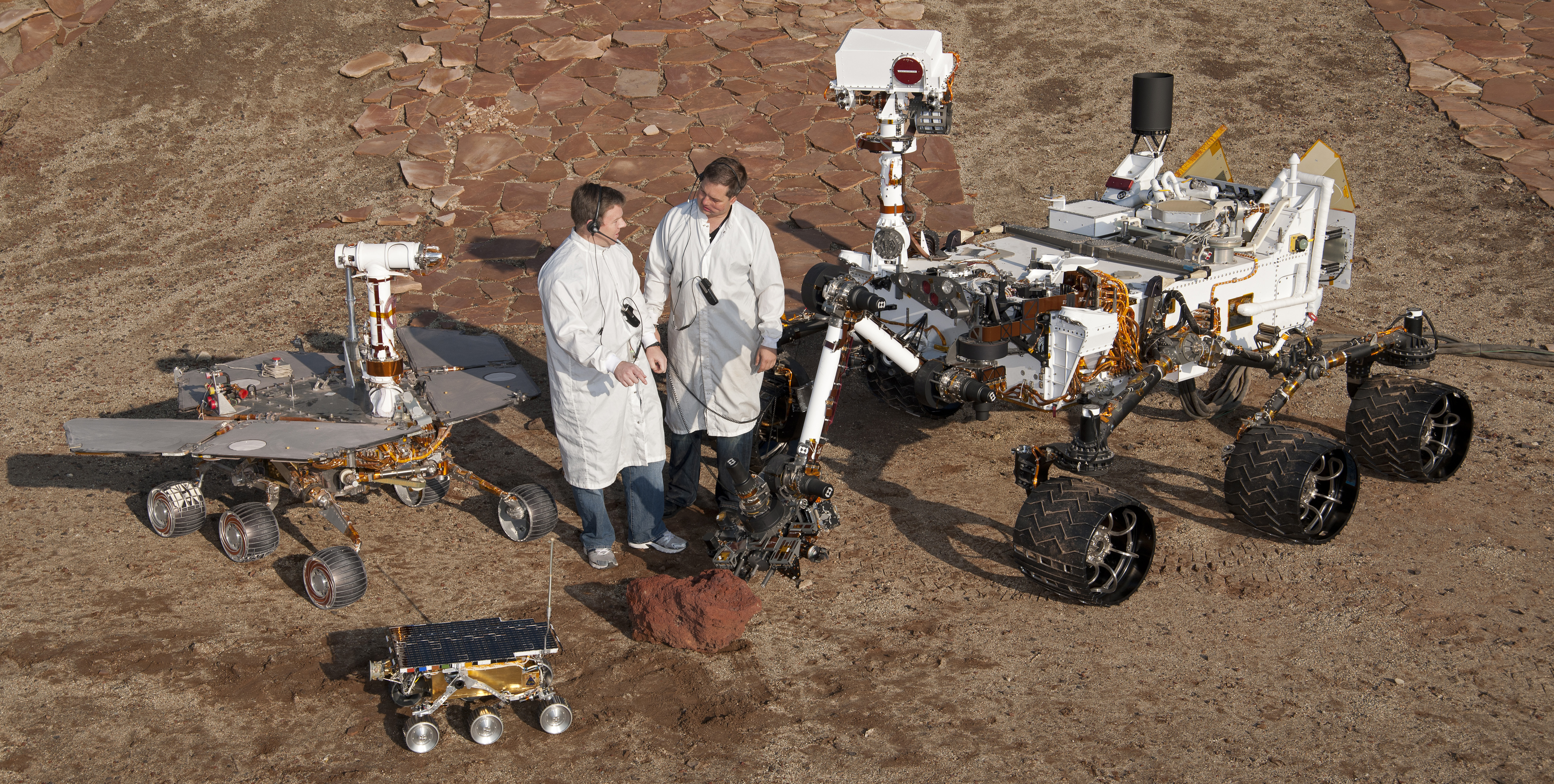
Two spacecraft engineers stand with a group of vehicles providing a comparison of three generations of Mars rovers developed at NASA's Jet Propulsion Laboratory. The setting is JPL's Mars Yard testing area. Front and center is the flight spare for the first Mars rover, Sojourner, which landed on Mars in 1997 as part of the Mars Pathfinder Project. On the left is a Mars Exploration Rover Project (MER) test rover that is a working sibling to Spirit and Opportunity, which landed on Mars in 2004. On the right is a Mars Science Laboratory test rover the size of that project's Mars rover, Curiosity, which landed on Mars in 2012. Sojourner and its flight spare, Marie Curie, are 65 cm long. The MER's rovers are 1.6 m long. The Curiosity rover is 3 m long.

Comparison of wheels of Sojourner, Spirit and Opportunity, and Curiosity rovers.

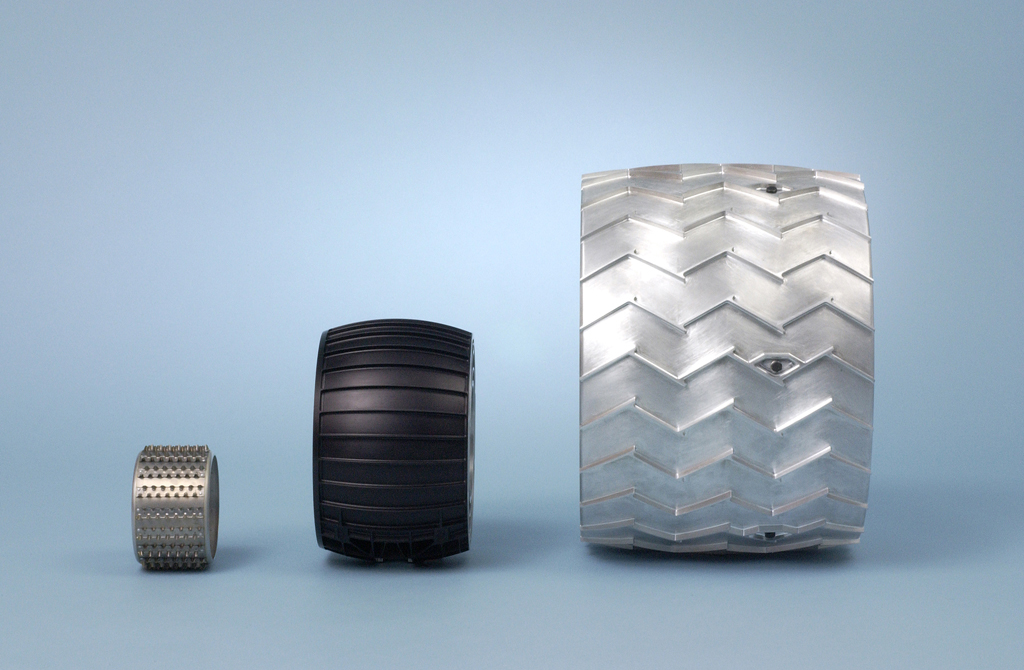

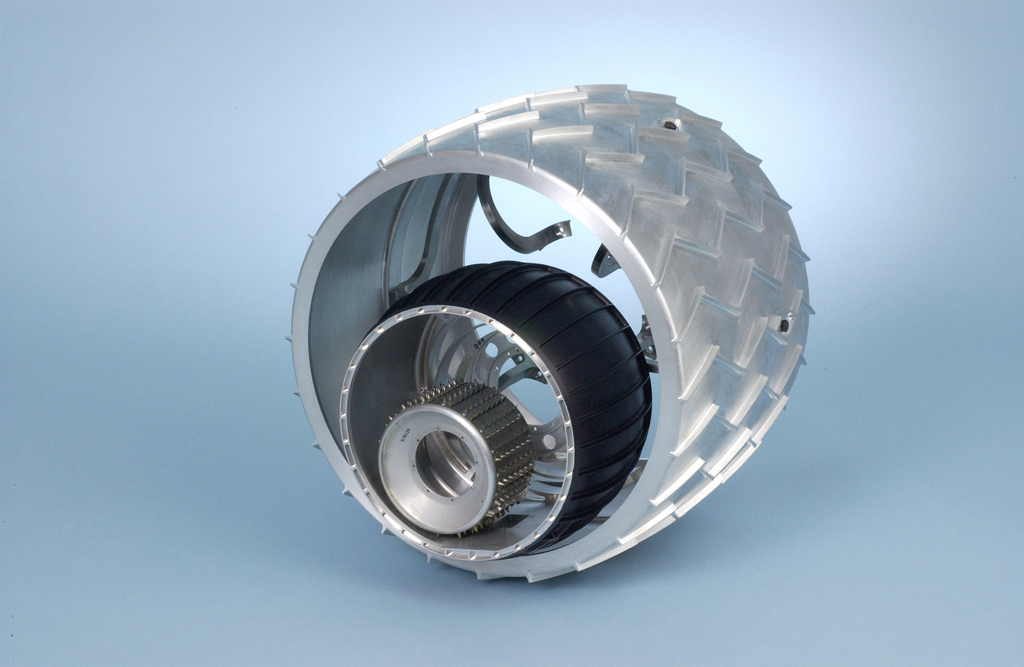

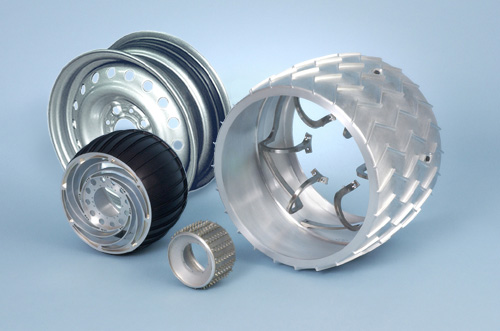

== See also ==
- Exploration of Mars
- Mars 3 (lander)
- Viking 1 (lander)
- Viking 2 (lander)
- Spirit (rover)
- Opportunity (rover)
- Curiosity (rover)
- Perseverance (rover)
- Zhurong (rover)
- Rosalind Franklin (rover) (planned mission)
- Comparison of embedded computer systems on board the Mars rovers
