= List of accolades received by The Favourite =

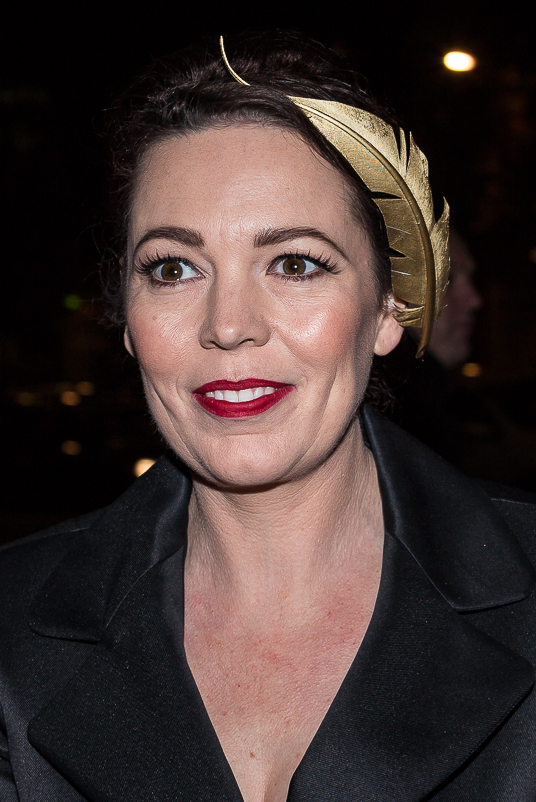
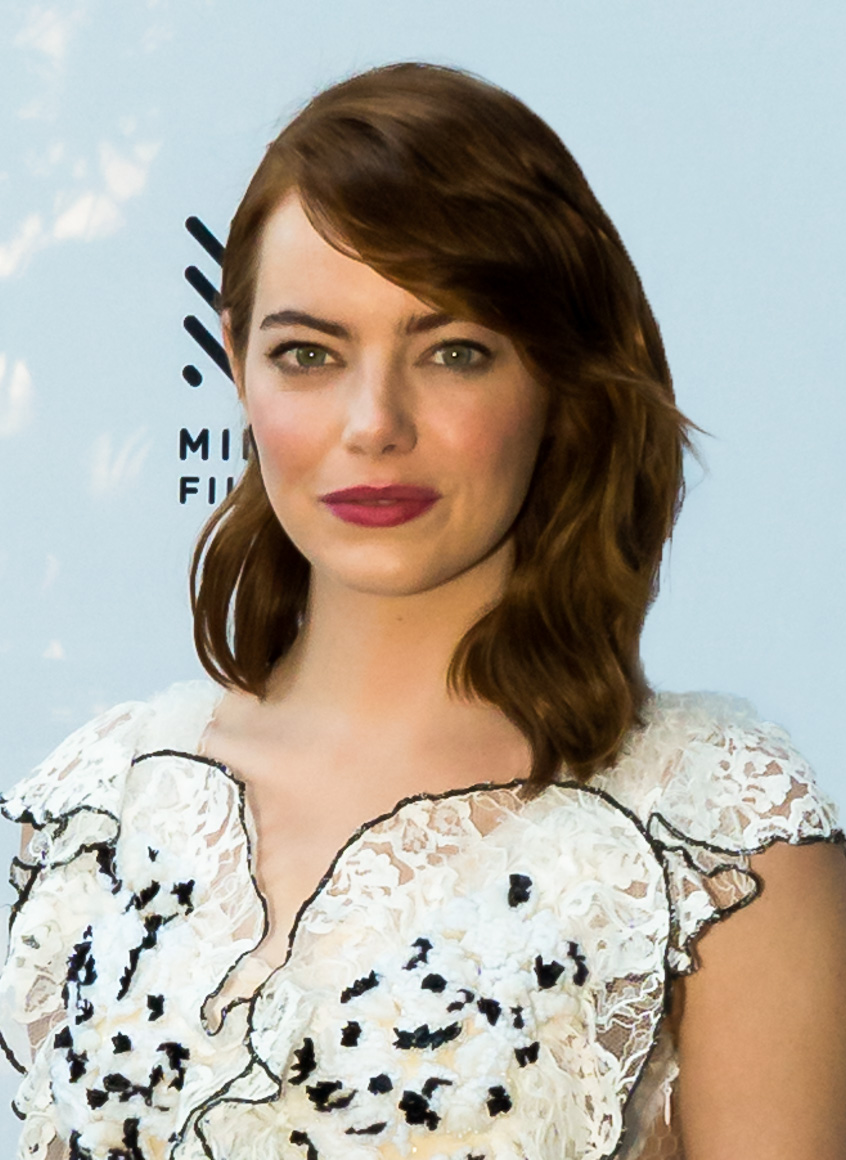
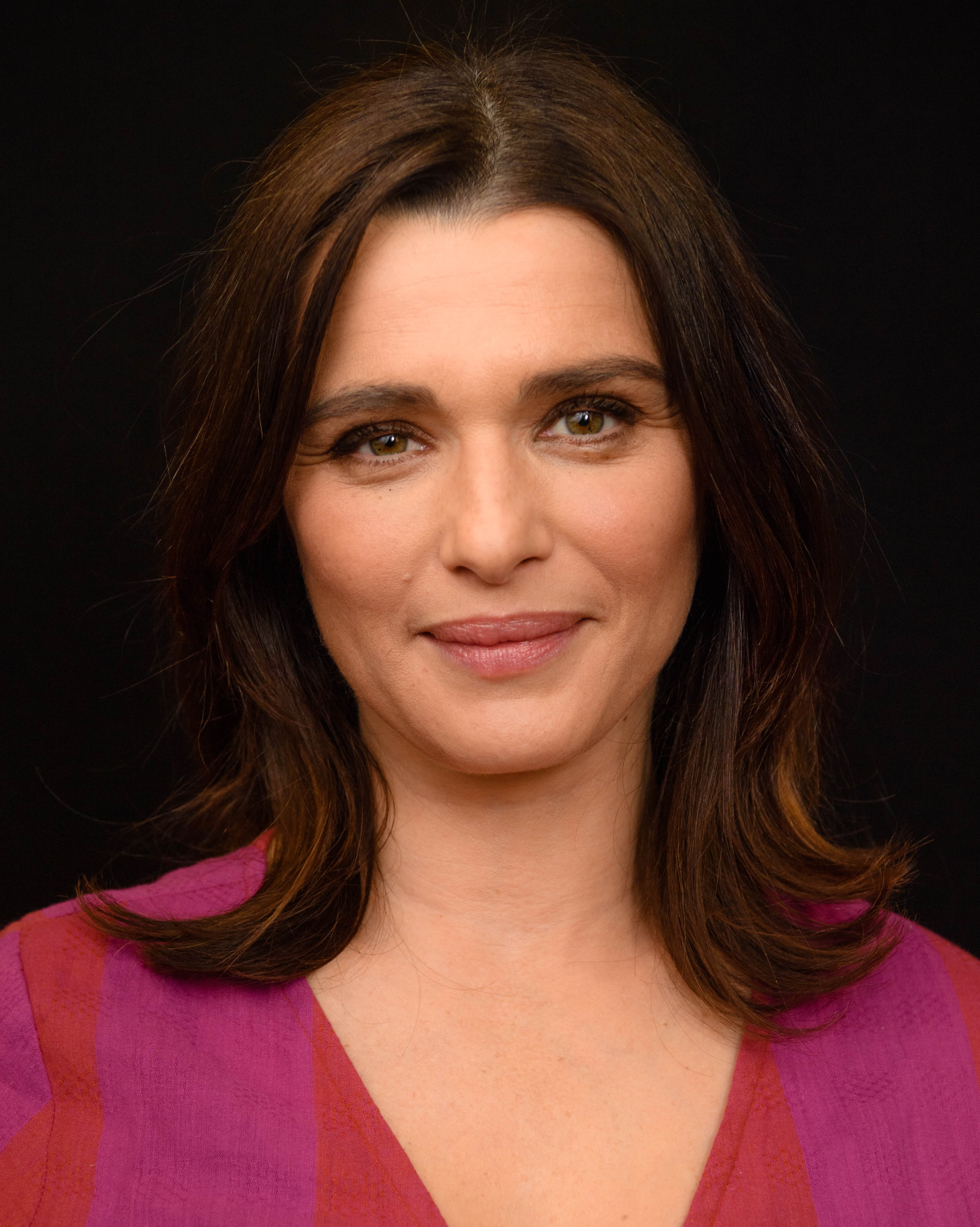
- Olivia Colman, Emma Stone, and Rachel Weisz received critical acclaim for their performances
Accolades
Award	Wins	Nominations
AACTA International Awards	2	3
AARP's Movies for Grownups Awards	0	1
Academy Awards	1	10
African-American Film Critics Association	1	1
Alliance of Women Film Journalists	0	11
American Cinema Editors	1	1
American Film Institute	1	1
American Society of Cinematographers	0	1
Art Directors Guild Awards	1	1
Austin Film Critics Association	2	8
Boston Society of Film Critics	2	2
British Academy Film Awards	7	12
British Film Institute	1	1
British Independent Film Awards	10	13
Camerimage	1	2
Chéries-Chéris	1	2
Chicago Film Critics Association	2	7
Cork Film Festival	0	1
Costume Designers Guild	1	1
Critics' Choice Movie Awards	2	14
Dallas–Fort Worth Film Critics Association	7	7
Detroit Film Critics Society	0	5
Dorian Awards	3	8
Film Fest Gent	0	1
Florida Film Critics Circle	3	9
Georgia Film Critics Association	3	9
Gijón International Film Festival	1	2
Golden Globe Awards	1	5
Golden Tomato Awards	1	2
Gotham Awards	1	4
Hollywood Film Awards	1	1
Houston Film Critics Society	2	7
Independent Spirit Awards	0	1
IndieWire Critics Poll	3	7
International Cinephile Society	0	6
La Roche-sur-Yon International Film Festival	1	1
London Film Critics' Circle	4	10
Los Angeles Film Critics Association	3	3
Motion Picture Sound Editors	0	2
National Society of Film Critics	3	3
New York Film Critics Online	3	3
Online Film Critics Society	1	8
Palm Springs International Film Festival	1	1
Producers Guild of America Awards	0	1
San Diego Film Critics Society	3	6
San Francisco Film Critics Circle	0	9
Satellite Awards	3	11
Screen Actors Guild Awards	0	3
Seattle Film Critics Society	2	11
St. Louis Film Critics Association	3	8
Telluride Film Festival	1	1
Toronto Film Critics Association	4	4
Vancouver Film Critics Circle	2	6
Venice Film Festival	2	4
Washington D.C. Area Film Critics Association	2	10
Women Film Critics Circle	3	4

Totals (Note: Certain award groups do not simply award one winner. They acknowledge several different recipients, have runners-up, and have third place. Since this is a specific recognition and is different from losing an award, runner-up mentions are considered wins in this award tally. For simplification and to avoid errors, each award in this list has been presumed to have had a prior nomination.)
- Wins: 119
- Nominations: 274

The Favourite is a 2018 historical dark comedy film directed by Yorgos Lanthimos, from a screenplay written by Deborah Davis and Tony McNamara. Taking place in the early 18th century, the story focuses on the rivalry between the Duchess of Marlborough (Rachel Weisz) and her younger cousin, Abigail Hill (Emma Stone), to be court favourites during the reign of Queen Anne (Olivia Colman) at the height of the War of the Spanish Succession. Nicholas Hoult, Joe Alwyn, James Smith, and Mark Gatiss feature in supporting roles. Sandy Powell designed the costumes; the cinematographer was Robbie Ryan.

It had its world premiere at the 75th Venice International Film Festival on 30 August 2018, where it won two awards: the Grand Jury Prize and the Volpi Cup for Best Actress (for Colman). It was released in the United States on 23 November 2018, by Fox Searchlight Pictures. Its opening $105,603 per-theater average was the highest opening average of the year. The film became a critical and commercial success, grossing $53.1 million on a $15 million budget, and has received critical acclaim, with particular praise given to its screenplay and direction, cinematography, editing, costume design, production values, music, and its three lead performances. Review aggregator Rotten Tomatoes surveyed 371 reviews and judged 93% of them to be positive. Metacritic calculated a weighted average score of 91/100 based on 53 reviews, indicating "universal acclaim". The Favourite was Metacritic's twelfth-best-reviewed film of 2018.

The Favourite won a record-breaking ten awards from thirteen nominations at the 2018 British Independent Film Awards, including Best Picture; Best Supporting Actress (Weisz); Best Director; Best Screenplay, and Best Actress for Colman, maintaining her record of winning each time she has been nominated. The film has received the most nominations at the 72nd British Academy Film Awards—including for Best Film, Best Direction, Best Actress in a Leading Role (Colman), Best Actress in a Supporting Role (both Stone and Weisz) and Best British Film. With ten nominations, it tied with Roma as the most-nominated film at the 91st Academy Awards. It was nominated for five Golden Globe Awards at the 76th ceremony, winning Best Actress – Motion Picture Comedy or Musical for Colman. It was ranked by the American Film Institute as one of the top 10 films of 2018.

== Accolades ==
Award	Date of ceremony	Category	Recipient(s)	Result	Ref(s)
AACTA International Awards	4 January 2019	Best Direction	Yorgos Lanthimos	Nominated	
AACTA International Awards	4 January 2019	Best Screenplay	Deborah Davis and Tony McNamara	Won	
AACTA International Awards	4 January 2019	Best Lead Actress	Olivia Colman	Won	
AARP's Movies for Grownups Awards	4 February 2019	Best Screenwriter	Deborah Davis and Tony McNamara	Nominated	
Academy Awards	24 February 2019	Best Picture	Ceci Dempsey, Ed Guiney, Lee Magiday and Yorgos Lanthimos	Nominated	
Academy Awards	24 February 2019	Best Director	Yorgos Lanthimos	Nominated	
Academy Awards	24 February 2019	Best Actress	Olivia Colman	Won	
Academy Awards	24 February 2019	Best Supporting Actress	Emma Stone	Nominated	
Academy Awards	24 February 2019	Best Supporting Actress	Rachel Weisz	Nominated	
Academy Awards	24 February 2019	Best Original Screenplay	Deborah Davis and Tony McNamara	Nominated	
Academy Awards	24 February 2019	Best Cinematography	Robbie Ryan	Nominated	
Academy Awards	24 February 2019	Best Costume Design	Sandy Powell (Note: Powell also earned another nomination in the category for her work on Mary Poppins Returns.)	Nominated	
Academy Awards	24 February 2019	Best Film Editing	Yorgos Mavropsaridis	Nominated	
Academy Awards	24 February 2019	Best Production Design	Fiona Crombie and Alice Felton	Nominated	
African-American Film Critics Association	11 December 2018	Top Ten Films	The Favourite	8th place	
Alliance of Women Film Journalists	9 January 2019	Best Film	The Favourite	Nominated	
Alliance of Women Film Journalists	9 January 2019	Best Director	Yorgos Lanthimos	Nominated	
Alliance of Women Film Journalists	9 January 2019	Best Original Screenplay	Deborah Davis and Tony McNamara	Won	
Alliance of Women Film Journalists	9 January 2019	Best Actress	Olivia Colman	Won	
Alliance of Women Film Journalists	9 January 2019	Best Supporting Actress	Emma Stone	Nominated	
Alliance of Women Film Journalists	9 January 2019	Best Supporting Actress	Rachel Weisz	Nominated	
Alliance of Women Film Journalists	9 January 2019	Best Ensemble Cast – Casting Director	Dixie Chassay	Nominated	
Alliance of Women Film Journalists	9 January 2019	Best Cinematography	Robbie Ryan	Nominated	
Alliance of Women Film Journalists	9 January 2019	Best Editing	Yorgos Mavropsaridis	Nominated	
Alliance of Women Film Journalists	9 January 2019	Best Woman Screenwriter	Deborah Davis (and Tony McNamara)	Won	
Alliance of Women Film Journalists	9 January 2019	Bravest Performance	Olivia Colman	Won	
American Cinema Editors	1 February 2019	Best Edited Feature Film – Comedy or Musical	Yorgos Mavropsaridis	Won	
American Film Institute	4 January 2019	Movies of the Year	The Favourite	Won	
American Society of Cinematographers	9 February 2019	Outstanding Achievement in Cinematography in Theatrical Releases	Robbie Ryan	Nominated	
Art Directors Guild Awards	2 February 2019	Excellence in Production Design for a Period Film	Fiona Crombie	Won	
Austin Film Critics Association	7 January 2019	Best Film	The Favourite	Nominated	
Austin Film Critics Association	7 January 2019	Best Director	Yorgos Lanthimos	Nominated	
Austin Film Critics Association	7 January 2019	Best Actress	Olivia Colman	Won	
Austin Film Critics Association	7 January 2019	Best Supporting Actress	Emma Stone	Nominated	
Austin Film Critics Association	7 January 2019	Best Supporting Actress	Rachel Weisz	Nominated	
Austin Film Critics Association	7 January 2019	Best Original Screenplay	Deborah Davis and Tony McNamara	Nominated	
Austin Film Critics Association	7 January 2019	Best Cinematography	Robbie Ryan	Nominated	
Austin Film Critics Association	7 January 2019	Best Ensemble	The Favourite	Nominated	
Austin Film Critics Association	7 January 2019	Top Ten Films	The Favourite	3rd place	
Boston Society of Film Critics	16 December 2018	Best Director	Yorgos Lanthimos	Runner-up	
Boston Society of Film Critics	16 December 2018	Best Ensemble	The Favourite	Runner-up	
British Academy Film Awards	10 February 2019	Best Film	Ceci Dempsey, Ed Guiney, Yorgos Lanthimos, and Lee Magiday	Nominated	
British Academy Film Awards	10 February 2019	Best Director	Yorgos Lanthimos	Nominated	
British Academy Film Awards	10 February 2019	Best Actress in a Leading Role	Olivia Colman	Won	
British Academy Film Awards	10 February 2019	Best Actress in a Supporting Role	Emma Stone	Nominated	
British Academy Film Awards	10 February 2019	Best Actress in a Supporting Role	Rachel Weisz	Won	
British Academy Film Awards	10 February 2019	Best Original Screenplay	Deborah Davis and Tony McNamara	Won	
British Academy Film Awards	10 February 2019	Best Cinematography	Robbie Ryan	Nominated	
British Academy Film Awards	10 February 2019	Outstanding British Film	Yorgos Lanthimos, Ceci Dempsey, Ed Guiney, Lee Magiday, Deborah Davis, Tony McNamara	Won	
British Academy Film Awards	10 February 2019	Best Production Design	Fiona Crombie and Alice Felton	Won	
British Academy Film Awards	10 February 2019	Best Costume Design	Sandy Powell	Won	
British Academy Film Awards	10 February 2019	Best Makeup and Hair	Nadia Stacey	Won	
British Academy Film Awards	10 February 2019	Best Editing	Yorgos Mavropsaridis	Nominated	
British Film Institute	11 December 2018	Sight & Sound's Best Films of 2018	The Favourite	7th place (Note: Tied with You Were Never Really Here.)	
British Independent Film Awards	2 December 2018	Best British Independent Film	Yorgos Lanthimos, Deborah Davis, Tony McNamara, Ceci Dempsey, Ed Guiney, and Lee Magiday	Won	
British Independent Film Awards	2 December 2018	Best Director	Yorgos Lanthimos	Won	
British Independent Film Awards	2 December 2018	Best Actress	Olivia Colman	Won	
British Independent Film Awards	2 December 2018	Best Supporting Actress	Emma Stone	Nominated	
British Independent Film Awards	2 December 2018	Best Supporting Actress	Rachel Weisz (Note: Weisz also earned another nomination in the Best Actress category for her work in Disobedience.)	Won	
British Independent Film Awards	2 December 2018	Best Casting	Dixie Chassay	Won	
British Independent Film Awards	2 December 2018	Best Cinematography	Robbie Ryan	Won	
British Independent Film Awards	2 December 2018	Best Costume Design	Sandy Powell	Won	
British Independent Film Awards	2 December 2018	Best Editing	Yorgos Mavropsaridis	Nominated	
British Independent Film Awards	2 December 2018	Best Make-up & Hair Design	Nadia Stacey	Won	
British Independent Film Awards	2 December 2018	Best Production Design	Fiona Crombie	Won	
British Independent Film Awards	2 December 2018	Best Screenplay	Deborah Davis and Tony McNamara	Won	
British Independent Film Awards	2 December 2018	Best Sound	Johnnie Burn	Nominated	
Camerimage	17 November 2018	Golden Frog	Robbie Ryan	Nominated	
Camerimage	17 November 2018	Audience Award	Robbie Ryan	Won	
Chéries-Chéris	27 November 2018	Grand Prize	The Favourite	Nominated	
Chéries-Chéris	27 November 2018	Special Mention	The Favourite	Won	
Chicago Film Critics Association	8 December 2018	Best Picture	The Favourite	Nominated	
Chicago Film Critics Association	8 December 2018	Best Director	Yorgos Lanthimos	Nominated	
Chicago Film Critics Association	8 December 2018	Best Supporting Actress	Olivia Colman	Won	
Chicago Film Critics Association	8 December 2018	Best Supporting Actress	Rachel Weisz	Nominated	
Chicago Film Critics Association	8 December 2018	Best Original Screenplay	Deborah Davis and Tony McNamara	Nominated	
Chicago Film Critics Association	8 December 2018	Best Art Direction	The Favourite	Won	
Chicago Film Critics Association	8 December 2018	Best Cinematography	Robbie Ryan	Nominated	
Cork Film Festival	18 November 2018	Spirit of the Festival Award	The Favourite	Nominated	
Costume Designers Guild	19 February 2019	Excellence in Period Film	Sandy Powell	Won	
Critics' Choice Movie Awards	13 January 2019	Best Picture	The Favourite	Nominated	
Critics' Choice Movie Awards	13 January 2019	Best Actress	Olivia Colman	Nominated	
Critics' Choice Movie Awards	13 January 2019	Best Supporting Actress	Emma Stone	Nominated	
Critics' Choice Movie Awards	13 January 2019	Best Supporting Actress	Rachel Weisz	Nominated	
Critics' Choice Movie Awards	13 January 2019	Best Acting Ensemble	The Favourite	Won	
Critics' Choice Movie Awards	13 January 2019	Best Director	Yorgos Lanthimos	Nominated	
Critics' Choice Movie Awards	13 January 2019	Best Original Screenplay	Deborah Davis and Tony McNamara	Nominated	
Critics' Choice Movie Awards	13 January 2019	Best Cinematography	Robbie Ryan	Nominated	
Critics' Choice Movie Awards	13 January 2019	Best Production Design	Fiona Crombie and Alice Felton	Nominated	
Critics' Choice Movie Awards	13 January 2019	Best Editing	Yorgos Mavropsaridis	Nominated	
Critics' Choice Movie Awards	13 January 2019	Best Costume Design	Sandy Powell	Nominated	
Critics' Choice Movie Awards	13 January 2019	Best Hair and Makeup	The Favourite	Nominated	
Critics' Choice Movie Awards	13 January 2019	Best Comedy	The Favourite	Nominated	
Critics' Choice Movie Awards	13 January 2019	Best Actress in a Comedy	Olivia Colman	Won	
Dallas–Fort Worth Film Critics Association	17 December 2018	Top 10 Films	The Favourite	3rd place	
Dallas–Fort Worth Film Critics Association	17 December 2018	Best Actress	Olivia Colman	Won	
Dallas–Fort Worth Film Critics Association	17 December 2018	Best Supporting Actress	Emma Stone	2nd place	
Dallas–Fort Worth Film Critics Association	17 December 2018	Best Supporting Actress	Rachel Weisz	3rd place	
Dallas–Fort Worth Film Critics Association	17 December 2018	Best Director	Yorgos Lanthimos	3rd place	
Dallas–Fort Worth Film Critics Association	17 December 2018	Best Screenplay	Deborah Davis and Tony McNamara	Won	
Dallas–Fort Worth Film Critics Association	17 December 2018	Best Cinematography	Robbie Ryan	2nd place	
Detroit Film Critics Society	3 December 2018	Best Actress	Olivia Colman	Nominated	
Detroit Film Critics Society	3 December 2018	Best Supporting Actress	Emma Stone	Nominated	
Detroit Film Critics Society	3 December 2018	Best Supporting Actress	Rachel Weisz	Nominated	
Detroit Film Critics Society	3 December 2018	Best Ensemble	The Favourite	Nominated	
Detroit Film Critics Society	3 December 2018	Best Screenplay	Deborah Davis and Tony McNamara	Nominated	
Dorian Awards	12 January 2019	Film of the Year	The Favourite	Won	
Dorian Awards	12 January 2019	Director of the Year (Film or Television)	Yorgos Lanthimos	Nominated	
Dorian Awards	12 January 2019	Film Performance of the Year — Actress	Olivia Colman	Won	
Dorian Awards	12 January 2019	Supporting Film Performance of the Year – Actress	Emma Stone	Nominated	
Dorian Awards	12 January 2019	Supporting Film Performance of the Year – Actress	Rachel Weisz	Nominated	
Dorian Awards	12 January 2019	LGBTQ Film of the Year	The Favourite	Nominated	
Dorian Awards	12 January 2019	Screenplay of the Year (Original or Adapted)	Deborah Davis and Tony McNamara	Won	
Dorian Awards	12 January 2019	Visually Striking Film of the Year	The Favourite	Nominated	
European Film Awards	7 December 2019	Best European Film	The Favourite	Won	
European Film Awards	7 December 2019	Best European Comedy	The Favourite	Won	
European Film Awards	7 December 2019	People's Choice Award	The Favourite	Nominated	
European Film Awards	7 December 2019	Best European Director	Yorgos Lanthimos	Won	
European Film Awards	7 December 2019	Best European Actress	Olivia Colman	Won	
European Film Awards	7 December 2019	Best European Cinematographer	Robbie Ryan	Won	
European Film Awards	7 December 2019	Best European Costume Designer	Sandy Powell	Won	
European Film Awards	7 December 2019	Best European Editor	Yorgos Mavropsaridis	Won	
European Film Awards	7 December 2019	Best European Makeup & Hair	Nadia Stacey	Won	
Film Fest Gent	19 October 2018	Best Film	The Favourite	Nominated	
Florida Film Critics Circle	21 December 2018	Best Picture	The Favourite	Won	
Florida Film Critics Circle	21 December 2018	Best Actress	Olivia Colman	Nominated	
Florida Film Critics Circle	21 December 2018	Best Supporting Actress	Emma Stone	Nominated	
Florida Film Critics Circle	21 December 2018	Best Supporting Actress	Rachel Weisz	Nominated	
Florida Film Critics Circle	21 December 2018	Best Ensemble	The Favourite	Won	
Florida Film Critics Circle	21 December 2018	Best Director	Yorgos Lanthimos	Nominated	
Florida Film Critics Circle	21 December 2018	Best Original Screenplay	Deborah Davis and Tony McNamara	Nominated	
Florida Film Critics Circle	21 December 2018	Best Cinematography	Robbie Ryan	Nominated	
Florida Film Critics Circle	21 December 2018	Best Art Direction / Production Design	The Favourite	Won	
Georgia Film Critics Association	12 January 2019	Best Picture	The Favourite	Nominated	
Georgia Film Critics Association	12 January 2019	Best Director	Yorgos Lanthimos	Nominated	
Georgia Film Critics Association	12 January 2019	Best Actress	Olivia Colman	Nominated	
Georgia Film Critics Association	12 January 2019	Best Supporting Actress	Emma Stone	Won	
Georgia Film Critics Association	12 January 2019	Best Supporting Actress	Rachel Weisz	Nominated	
Georgia Film Critics Association	12 January 2019	Original Screenplay	Deborah Davis and Tony McNamara	Nominated	
Georgia Film Critics Association	12 January 2019	Best Cinematography	Robbie Ryan	Nominated	
Georgia Film Critics Association	12 January 2019	Production Design	Fiona Crombie and Alice Felton	Won	
Georgia Film Critics Association	12 January 2019	Best Ensemble	The Favourite	Won	
Gijón International Film Festival	24 November 2018	Principado de Asturias Prize for Best Feature Film	The Favourite	Nominated	
Gijón International Film Festival	24 November 2018	AISGE Award for Best Actress	Olivia Colman	Won	
Golden Globe Awards	6 January 2019	Best Motion Picture – Musical or Comedy	The Favourite	Nominated	
Golden Globe Awards	6 January 2019	Best Actress – Motion Picture Comedy or Musical	Olivia Colman	Won	
Golden Globe Awards	6 January 2019	Best Supporting Actress – Motion Picture	Emma Stone	Nominated	
Golden Globe Awards	6 January 2019	Best Supporting Actress – Motion Picture	Rachel Weisz	Nominated	
Golden Globe Awards	6 January 2019	Best Screenplay	Deborah Davis and Tony McNamara	Nominated	
Golden Tomato Awards	11 January 2019	Best-Reviewed Comedies	The Favourite	2nd place	
Golden Tomato Awards	25 January 2019	Fans' Choice for Favorite Movie of 2018	The Favourite	Nominated	
Gotham Awards	26 November 2018	Best Feature	The Favourite	Nominated	
Gotham Awards	26 November 2018	Best Screenplay	Deborah Davis and Tony McNamara	Nominated	
Gotham Awards	26 November 2018	Special Jury Award for Ensemble Performance	Olivia Colman, Emma Stone, and Rachel Weisz	Won	
Gotham Awards	26 November 2018	Audience Award	The Favourite	Nominated	
Hollywood Film Awards	4 November 2018	Hollywood Supporting Actress Award	Rachel Weisz	Proposed (Note: Weisz was announced to receive the Hollywood Supporting Actress Award on 11 October 2018, however she was later not included from the final winner list.)	
Hollywood Film Awards	4 November 2018	Hollywood Costume Design Award	Sandy Powell	Won	
Houston Film Critics Society	3 January 2019	Best Picture	The Favourite	Won	
Houston Film Critics Society	3 January 2019	Best Director	Yorgos Lanthimos	Nominated	
Houston Film Critics Society	3 January 2019	Best Actress	Olivia Colman	Nominated	
Houston Film Critics Society	3 January 2019	Best Supporting Actress	Emma Stone	Nominated	
Houston Film Critics Society	3 January 2019	Best Supporting Actress	Rachel Weisz	Won	
Houston Film Critics Society	3 January 2019	Best Screenplay	Deborah Davis and Tony McNamara	Won	
Houston Film Critics Society	3 January 2019	Best Cinematography	Robbie Ryan	Nominated	
Independent Spirit Awards	23 February 2019	Best International Film	Yorgos Lanthimos	Nominated	
IndieWire Critics Poll	17 December 2018	Best Film	The Favourite	4th place	
IndieWire Critics Poll	17 December 2018	Best Director	Yorgos Lanthimos	4th place	
IndieWire Critics Poll	17 December 2018	Best Actress	Olivia Colman	Won	
IndieWire Critics Poll	17 December 2018	Best Supporting Actress	Emma Stone	3rd place	
IndieWire Critics Poll	17 December 2018	Best Supporting Actress	Rachel Weisz	Won	
IndieWire Critics Poll	17 December 2018	Best Screenplay	Deborah Davis and Tony McNamara	Won	
IndieWire Critics Poll	17 December 2018	Best Cinematography	Robbie Ryan	5th place	
International Cinephile Society	3 February 2019	Best Picture	The Favourite	11th place	
International Cinephile Society	3 February 2019	Best Actress	Olivia Colman	Nominated	
International Cinephile Society	3 February 2019	Best Supporting Actress	Rachel Weisz	Won	
International Cinephile Society	3 February 2019	Best Original Screenplay	Deborah Davis and Tony McNamara	Nominated	
International Cinephile Society	3 February 2019	Best Production Design	Fiona Crombie	Nominated	
International Cinephile Society	3 February 2019	Best Ensemble	The Favourite	Nominated	
Location Managers Guild Awards	21 September 2019	Outstanding Locations in Period Film	Daragh Coghlan, Adam Richards	Nominated	
La Roche-sur-Yon International Film Festival	21 October 2018	Special Jury Prize	The Favourite	Won (Note: Tied with Profile.)	
London Film Critics' Circle	20 January 2019	Film of the Year	The Favourite	Nominated	
London Film Critics' Circle	20 January 2019	British/Irish Film of the Year: The Attenborough Award	The Favourite	Won	
London Film Critics' Circle	20 January 2019	Director of the Year	Yorgos Lanthimos	Nominated	
London Film Critics' Circle	20 January 2019	Screenwriter of the Year	Deborah Davis and Tony McNamara	Won	
London Film Critics' Circle	20 January 2019	Actress of the Year	Olivia Colman	Won	
London Film Critics' Circle	20 January 2019	Supporting Actress of the Year	Rachel Weisz	Won	
London Film Critics' Circle	20 January 2019	British/Irish Actress of the Year	Olivia Colman	Nominated	
London Film Critics' Circle	20 January 2019	British/Irish Actress of the Year	Rachel Weisz (Note: Also for her work in Disobedience.)	Nominated	
London Film Critics' Circle	20 January 2019	Breakthrough British/Irish Filmmaker of the Year: The Philip French Award	Deborah Davis	Nominated	
London Film Critics' Circle	20 January 2019	Technical Achievement Award	Fiona Crombie	Nominated	
Los Angeles Film Critics Association	9 December 2018	Best Actress	Olivia Colman	Won	
Los Angeles Film Critics Association	9 December 2018	Best Screenplay	Deborah Davis and Tony McNamara	2nd place	
Los Angeles Film Critics Association	9 December 2018	Best Production Design	Fiona Crombie	2nd place	
Motion Picture Sound Editors	17 February 2019	Feature Film – Dialogue / ADR	Johnnie BurnJohnnie Burn	Nominated	
Motion Picture Sound Editors	17 February 2019	Feature Film – Effects / Foley	Johnnie BurnJohnnie Burn	Nominated	
National Society of Film Critics	5 January 2019	Best Actress	Olivia Colman	Won	
National Society of Film Critics	5 January 2019	Best Supporting Actress	Emma Stone	3rd place	
National Society of Film Critics	5 January 2019	Best Screenplay	Deborah Davis and Tony McNamara	3rd place	
New York Film Critics Online	9 December 2018	Best Screenplay	Deborah Davis and Tony McNamara	Won	
New York Film Critics Online	9 December 2018	Best Ensemble Cast	The Favourite	Won	
New York Film Critics Online	9 December 2018	Top Ten Films	The Favourite	Won	
Online Film Critics Society	2 January 2019	Best Picture	The Favourite	5th place	
Online Film Critics Society	2 January 2019	Best Director	Yorgos Lanthimos	Nominated	
Online Film Critics Society	2 January 2019	Best Lead Actress	Olivia Colman	Nominated	
Online Film Critics Society	2 January 2019	Best Supporting Actress	Emma Stone	Nominated	
Online Film Critics Society	2 January 2019	Best Supporting Actress	Rachel Weisz	Nominated	
Online Film Critics Society	2 January 2019	Best Original Screenplay	Deborah Davis and Tony McNamara	Nominated	
Online Film Critics Society	2 January 2019	Best Editing	Yorgos Mavropsaridis	Nominated	
Online Film Critics Society	2 January 2019	Best Cinematography	Robbie Ryan	Nominated	
Palm Springs International Film Festival	3 January 2019	Desert Palm Achievement Award	Olivia Colman	Won	
Producers Guild of America Awards	19 January 2019	Best Theatrical Motion Picture	Ceci Dempsey, Ed Guiney, Lee Magiday, and Yorgos Lanthimos	Nominated	
San Diego Film Critics Society	10 December 2018	Best Film	The Favourite	Nominated	
San Diego Film Critics Society	10 December 2018	Best Director	Yorgos Lanthimos	Nominated	
San Diego Film Critics Society	10 December 2018	Best Costume Design	Sandy Powell	Won (Note: Tied with Lindy Hemming for Paddington 2.)	
San Diego Film Critics Society	10 December 2018	Best Editing	Yorgos Mavropsaridis	Nominated	
San Diego Film Critics Society	10 December 2018	Best Production Design	Fiona Crombie	Won	
San Diego Film Critics Society	10 December 2018	Best Ensemble	The Favourite	2nd place	
San Francisco Film Critics Circle	9 December 2018	Best Picture	The Favourite	Nominated	
San Francisco Film Critics Circle	9 December 2018	Best Director	Yorgos Lanthimos	Nominated	
San Francisco Film Critics Circle	9 December 2018	Best Actress	Olivia Colman	Nominated	
San Francisco Film Critics Circle	9 December 2018	Best Supporting Actress	Emma Stone	Nominated	
San Francisco Film Critics Circle	9 December 2018	Best Supporting Actress	Rachel Weisz	Nominated	
San Francisco Film Critics Circle	9 December 2018	Best Screenplay	Deborah Davis and Tony McNamara	Nominated	
San Francisco Film Critics Circle	9 December 2018	Best Cinematography	Robbie Ryan	Nominated	
San Francisco Film Critics Circle	9 December 2018	Best Production Design	Fiona Crombie	Nominated	
San Francisco Film Critics Circle	9 December 2018	Best Film Editing	Yorgos Mavropsaridis	Nominated	
Satellite Awards	17 February 2019	Best Motion Picture – Comedy or Musical	The Favourite	Nominated	
Satellite Awards	17 February 2019	Best Director	Yorgos Lanthimos	Nominated	
Satellite Awards	17 February 2019	Best Actress in Motion Picture – Comedy or Musical	Olivia Colman	Won	
Satellite Awards	17 February 2019	Best Actress in a Supporting Role	Emma Stone	Nominated	
Satellite Awards	17 February 2019	Best Actress in a Supporting Role	Rachel Weisz	Nominated	
Satellite Awards	17 February 2019	Best Art Direction & Production Design	Fiona Crombie	Nominated	
Satellite Awards	17 February 2019	Best Cinematography	Robbie Ryan	Nominated	
Satellite Awards	17 February 2019	Best Costume Design	Sandy Powell	Won	
Satellite Awards	17 February 2019	Best Ensemble – Motion Picture	The Favourite	Won	
Satellite Awards	17 February 2019	Best Original Screenplay	Deborah Davis and Tony McNamara	Nominated	
Screen Actors Guild Awards	27 January 2019	Outstanding Performance by a Female Actor in a Leading Role	Olivia Colman	Nominated	
Screen Actors Guild Awards	27 January 2019	Outstanding Performance by a Female Actor in a Supporting Role	Emma Stone	Nominated	
Screen Actors Guild Awards	27 January 2019	Outstanding Performance by a Female Actor in a Supporting Role	Rachel Weisz	Nominated	
Seattle Film Critics Society	17 December 2018	Best Picture of the Year	The Favourite	Nominated	
Seattle Film Critics Society	17 December 2018	Best Director	Yorgos Lanthimos	Nominated	
Seattle Film Critics Society	17 December 2018	Best Actress in a Leading Role	Olivia Colman	Nominated	
Seattle Film Critics Society	17 December 2018	Best Actress in a Supporting Role	Emma Stone	Nominated	
Seattle Film Critics Society	17 December 2018	Best Actress in a Supporting Role	Rachel Weisz	Nominated	
Seattle Film Critics Society	17 December 2018	Best Ensemble Cast	The Favourite	Nominated	
Seattle Film Critics Society	17 December 2018	Best Screenplay	Deborah Davis and Tony McNamara	Won	
Seattle Film Critics Society	17 December 2018	Best Cinematography	Robbie Ryan	Nominated	
Seattle Film Critics Society	17 December 2018	Best Costume Design	Sandy Powell	Nominated	
Seattle Film Critics Society	17 December 2018	Best Film Editing	Yorgos Mavropsaridis	Nominated	
Seattle Film Critics Society	17 December 2018	Best Production Design	Fiona Crombie and Alice Felton	Won	
St. Louis Film Critics Association	17 December 2018	Best Director	Yorgos Lanthimos	Nominated	
St. Louis Film Critics Association	17 December 2018	Best Actress	Olivia Colman	Nominated	
St. Louis Film Critics Association	17 December 2018	Best Supporting Actress	Emma Stone	Runner-up	
St. Louis Film Critics Association	17 December 2018	Best Supporting Actress	Rachel Weisz	Nominated	
St. Louis Film Critics Association	17 December 2018	Best Original Screenplay	Deborah Davis and Tony McNamara	Runner-up	
St. Louis Film Critics Association	17 December 2018	Best Cinematography	Robbie Ryan	Nominated	
St. Louis Film Critics Association	17 December 2018	Best Production Design	Fiona Crombie	Runner-up	
St. Louis Film Critics Association	17 December 2018	Best Comedy	The Favourite	Won	
Telluride Film Festival	3 September 2018	Silver Medallion	Emma Stone	Won	
Toronto Film Critics Association	10 December 2018	Best Actress	Olivia Colman	Won	
Toronto Film Critics Association	10 December 2018	Best Supporting Actress	Emma Stone	Runner-up	
Toronto Film Critics Association	10 December 2018	Best Supporting Actress	Rachel Weisz	Runner-up	
Toronto Film Critics Association	10 December 2018	Best Screenplay, Adapted or Original	Deborah Davis and Tony McNamara	Won (Note: Tied with Paul Schrader for First Reformed.)	
Vancouver Film Critics Circle	17 December 2018	Best Picture	The Favourite	Nominated	
Vancouver Film Critics Circle	17 December 2018	Best Actor, Female	Olivia Colman	Won (Note: Tied with Melissa McCarthy for Can You Ever Forgive Me? and Regina Hall for Support the Girls.)	
Vancouver Film Critics Circle	17 December 2018	Best Supporting Actor, Female	Emma Stone	Nominated	
Vancouver Film Critics Circle	17 December 2018	Best Supporting Actor, Female	Rachel Weisz	Won	
Vancouver Film Critics Circle	17 December 2018	Best Director	Yorgos Lanthimos	Nominated	
Vancouver Film Critics Circle	17 December 2018	Best Screenplay	Deborah Davis and Tony McNamara	Nominated	
Venice Film Festival	8 September 2018	Golden Lion	The Favourite	Nominated	
Venice Film Festival	8 September 2018	Grand Jury Prize	The Favourite	Won	
Venice Film Festival	8 September 2018	Queer Lion	The Favourite	Nominated	
Venice Film Festival	8 September 2018	Volpi Cup for Best Actress	Olivia Colman	Won	
Washington D.C. Area Film Critics Association	3 December 2018	Best Film	The Favourite	Nominated	
Washington D.C. Area Film Critics Association	3 December 2018	Best Director	Yorgos Lanthimos	Nominated	
Washington D.C. Area Film Critics Association	3 December 2018	Best Actress	Olivia Colman	Nominated	
Washington D.C. Area Film Critics Association	3 December 2018	Best Supporting Actress	Emma Stone	Nominated	
Washington D.C. Area Film Critics Association	3 December 2018	Best Supporting Actress	Rachel Weisz	Nominated	
Washington D.C. Area Film Critics Association	3 December 2018	Best Acting Ensemble	The Favourite	Won	
Washington D.C. Area Film Critics Association	3 December 2018	Best Cinematography	Robbie Ryan	Nominated	
Washington D.C. Area Film Critics Association	3 December 2018	Best Editing	Yorgos Mavropsaridis	Nominated	
Washington D.C. Area Film Critics Association	3 December 2018	Best Original Screenplay	Deborah Davis and Tony McNamara	Won	
Washington D.C. Area Film Critics Association	3 December 2018	Best Production Design	Fiona Crombie	Nominated	
Women Film Critics Circle	15 December 2018	Best Movie About Women	The Favourite	Won	
Women Film Critics Circle	15 December 2018	Best Actress	Olivia Colman	Won	
Women Film Critics Circle	15 December 2018	Best Comedic Actress	Olivia Colman	Won	
Women Film Critics Circle	15 December 2018	Women's Work / Best Ensemble	The Favourite	Nominated	

== See also ==
- 2018 in film
