= San Francisco Bay Area Film Critics Circle Awards 2018 =

Annual US film awards ceremony

17th SFBAFCC Awards

December 10, 2018

Best Picture:
Roma

Best Animated Feature:
Spider-Man: Into the Spider-Verse

Best Documentary:
Won't You Be My Neighbor?

Best Foreign Language Film:
Roma

The 17th San Francisco Bay Area Film Critics Circle Awards, honoring the best in film for 2018, were given on December 10, 2018.

== Winners and nominees ==
These are the nominees for the 17th SFFCC Awards. Winners are listed at the top of each list:

Best Picture	Best Director
Roma; BlacKkKlansman; The Favourite; First Reformed; If Beale Street Could Talk	Spike Lee – BlacKkKlansman; Alfonso Cuarón – Roma; Barry Jenkins – If Beale Street Could Talk; Yorgos Lanthimos – The Favourite; Paul Schrader – First Reformed
Best Actor	Best Actress
Ethan Hawke – First Reformed; Christian Bale – Vice; Willem Dafoe – At Eternity's Gate; Rami Malek – Bohemian Rhapsody; Viggo Mortensen – Green Book	Melissa McCarthy – Can You Ever Forgive Me?; Yalitza Aparicio – Roma; Toni Collette – Hereditary; Olivia Colman – The Favourite; Lady Gaga – A Star Is Born; Regina Hall – Support the Girls
Best Supporting Actor	Best Supporting Actress
Michael B. Jordan – Black Panther; Mahershala Ali – Green Book; Adam Driver – BlacKkKlansman; Richard E. Grant – Can You Ever Forgive Me?; Russell Hornsby – The Hate U Give	Regina King – If Beale Street Could Talk; Amy Adams – Vice; Thomasin McKenzie – Leave No Trace; Emma Stone – The Favourite; Rachel Weisz – The Favourite
Best Adapted Screenplay	Best Original Screenplay
Charlie Wachtel, David Rabinowitz, Kevin Willmott, and Spike Lee – BlacKkKlansman; Ryan Coogler and Joe Robert Cole – Black Panther; Debra Granik and Anne Rosellini – Leave No Trace; Nicole Holofcener and Jeff Whitty – Can You Ever Forgive Me?; Barry Jenkins – If Beale Street Could Talk	Paul Schrader – First Reformed; Bo Burnham – Eighth Grade; Alfonso Cuarón – Roma; Deborah Davis and Tony McNamara – The Favourite; Adam McKay – Vice
Best Animated Feature	Best Documentary
Spider-Man: Into the Spider-Verse; Incredibles 2; Isle of Dogs; Mirai; Ralph Breaks the Internet	Won't You Be My Neighbor?; Free Solo; Minding the Gap; Shirkers; Three Identical Strangers
Best Foreign Language Film	Best Cinematography
Roma; Burning; Cold War; Let the Sunshine In; Shoplifters	Alfonso Cuarón – Roma; James Laxton – If Beale Street Could Talk; Robbie Ryan – The Favourite; Linus Sandgren – First Man; Łukasz Żal – Cold War
Best Film Editing	Best Production Design
Bob Murawski and Orson Welles – The Other Side of the Wind; Tom Cross – First Man; Yorgos Mavropsaridis – The Favourite; Eddie Hamilton – Mission: Impossible – Fallout; Alfonso Cuarón and Adam Gough – Roma	Hannah Beachler – Black Panther; Eugenio Caballero – Roma; Fiona Crombie – The Favourite; Nathan Crowley – First Man; Mark Friedberg – If Beale Street Could Talk; Paul Harrod and Adam Stockhausen – Isle of Dogs
Best Original Score	
Terence Blanchard – BlacKkKlansman; Nicholas Britell – If Beale Street Could Talk; Alexandre Desplat – Isle of Dogs; Ludwig Göransson – Black Panther; Justin Hurwitz – First Man	

== Special awards ==
=== Special Citation for under-appreciated independent cinema ===
- The Endless – "A genre-bending story of emotionally estranged brothers starring and directed by Justin Benson and Aaron Moorhead."

=== Marlon Riggs Award for courage & vision in the Bay Area film community ===
- Boots Riley – "The musician-turned-filmmaker made one of the most distinctive debut features of 2018: the crazy, shot-in-Oakland Sorry to Bother You. The Oakland resident's influence extends throughout the Bay Area and beyond. His film generated big buzz at the Sundance Film Festival, where it debuted this year, and he's developing a new TV series."
