= Donald Crombie =

Australian film and television director (1942–2025)

Donald Crombie AM
- Born: 5 July 1942; Brisbane, Queensland, Australia
- Died: 25 March 2025 (aged 82)
- Education: Anglican Church Grammar School; National Institute of Dramatic Art
- Occupation: Film and television director
- Children: Fiona Crombie

Donald Charles Crombie AM (5 July 1942 – 25 March 2025) was an Australian film and television director. He is known for the films Caddie (1976), The Irishman (1978), Cathy's Child (1979), Playing Beatie Bow (1986), and Selkie (2000), and also for his work on several TV series, including Flipper (1995–1997) and McLeod's Daughters (2001–2002).

== Early life and education ==
Donald Charles Crombie was born on 5 July 1942 in Brisbane, Queensland. He never met his father, who was killed in 1944 while a pilot for the Royal Air Force, and was brought up by his mother alone, in Queensland.

He was educated at the Anglican Church Grammar School and studied at the National Institute of Dramatic Art.

== Career ==
Crombie started work at the Commonwealth Film Unit (now Screen Australia) around 1963. In 1967 he directed a short documentary film made for the CFU titled Is Anybody Doing Anything About It?. The film used a lighthearted presentation to explain scientific techniques used in weather forecasting, as well as the international importance of Australia's Bureau of Meteorology.

He also worked for the South Australian Film Corporation (SAFC) as one of their first drama directors, where he helped to shape the cultural identity of the South Australian film industry. His projects there included the TV miniseries Stacey's Gym (1973) and the TV documentary drama film Who Killed Jenny Langby? (1974). The latter was his first docudrama, and starred the then inexperienced Julie Dawson, who won the AFI Award for Best Actress in a Leading Role for her performance. The film was highest-rated drama on ABC Television for several years.

in 1981, Crombie directed thriller The Killing of Angel Street, which was loosely based on the real-life disappearance of anti-development activist Juanita Nielsen. Producer Tony Buckley warned him that it was dangerous making the film, but he went ahead anyway. During the 1980s, Crombie directed the thrilling miniseries Cyclone Tracy and The Heroes (1988), a moving story about Operation Jaywick, an Allied forces raid on Japanese shipping in Singapore harbour by the Australian Z Special Unit during World War II in 1943.

Crombie wrote and directed the film Rough Diamonds, released in 1994.

Over his long career (as of 2008 – 46 years in total, with 35 years as a freelancer), he directed feature films, telemovies, mini-series, drama series, documentaries, and commercials, and also wrote film and television scripts. He was known for pioneering depictions of strong, independent women as central characters, a rare feature of 1970s screen work.

== Memberships and other activities ==
Crombie was a board member of the Australian Writers' Guild, Australian Screen Directors Authorship Collecting Society (ASDACS), and Australian Screen Directors' Association (ASDA; now Australian Directors' Guild). He was president of ASDA for over five years.

== Recognition and honours ==
Crombie's 1967 short documentary Is Anybody Doing Anything About It? won a Silver Award at the Australian Film Awards (AFI Awards). In 1970, his film Personnel or People? won a Bronze Award in the Educational category of the AFI Awards In 1979, Cathy's Child was nominated for the AFI Award for Best Film.

His 1981 film The Killing of Angel Street premiered at the 32nd Berlin Film Festival, where it received an honourable mention.

Crombie was made a Member of the Order of Australia (AM) in the Queen's Birthday 2017 Honours List, "For significant service to the Australian film and television industry through contributions as a director and writer, and to professional organisations".

After his death in April 2025, South Australian filmmaker Justin Kurzel wrote in The Sydney Morning Herald, that Crombie had been his "first film hero", and called him "a giant of the industry". In his opinion, the films Caddy and Cathy's Child ranked alongside Gillian Armstrong's 1979 film My Brilliant Career, in being "groundbreaking in cinematically presenting a female perspective and portraying women navigating their own paths and asserting their voices".

== Personal life and death ==
Crombie was married to Judith Crombie, former SAFC CEO, until her resignation in 2004. The couple had four children, three of whom worked in radio, theatre, or film. One of these is costume and production designer Fiona Crombie, who went to school and was friends with Justin Kurzel.

The family lived in Adelaide during the 1980s. In 2017, Crombie was living in New South Wales.

He died on 25 March 2025, at the age of 82.

== Filmography ==
=== Feature films ===
- The Choice (1971)
- Caddie (1976)
- The Irishman (1978) (also writer)
- Cathy's Child (1979)
- The Killing of Angel Street (1981)
- Kitty and the Bagman (1983)
- Playing Beatie Bow (1986)
- Rough Diamonds (1994) (also writer)
- Selkie (2000)

=== Television ===
- Stacey's Gym (1973)
- Who Killed Jenny Langby? (1974; docudrama film; also co-writer)
- Do I Have to Kill My Child? (1976) (also writer)
- Cyclone Tracy (1986) (miniseries)
- The Heroes (1988) (miniseries)
- The Alien Years (1988) (miniseries)
- The Saint: Fear in Fun Park (1989)
- The River Kings (1991) (miniseries)
- Heroes II: The Return (1991) (miniseries)
- The Feds: Terror (1993)
- Time Trax (1993–1994)
- The Celluloid Heroes (1995) (documentary series)
- Flipper (1995–1997)
- Tales of the South Seas (1998)
- McLeod's Daughters (2001–2002)

=== Other ===
- Aircraft at Work (1966) (documentary) (also writer)
- Is Anybody Doing Anything About It? (1967) (short documentary for the Commonwealth Film Unit; also writer)
- Sailor (1968) (documentary)
- Top End (1968) (documentary)
- Our Land Australia (1972) (documentary) (also producer, co-writer)
- Robbery Under Arms (1985) (cinema and a television miniseries release)
