= Alice Felton =

British set decorator

- Occupation: Set decorator

Alice Felton is a British set decorator. She was nominated for two Academy Awards in the category Best Production Design for the films The Favourite and Hamnet.

At the 72nd British Academy Film Awards, she won a BAFTA Award for Best Production Design. Her win was shared with Fiona Crombie.

== Selected filmography ==
- The Favourite (2018)
- Hamnet (2025)
