= The Killing of Angel Street =

- Film poster
- Directed by: Donald Crombie
- Written by: Michael Craig; Cecil Holmes; Evan Jones
- Produced by: Anthony Buckley
- Starring: Liz Alexander; John Hargreaves
- Cinematography: Peter James
- Edited by: Tim Wellburn
- Music by: Brian May
- Release date: 1 October 1981
- Running time: 96 minutes
- Country: Australia
- Language: English
- Budget: AU $1.3 million

The Killing of Angel Street is a 1981 Australian thriller film loosely based on the Builders Labourers Federation (BLF) green bans against development in inner Sydney city waterside suburbs. It briefly touches on the real-life disappearance of Juanita Nielsen, an activist against mass development in Sydney in the late 1970s.

The film was directed by Donald Crombie and shot in Sydney, New South Wales, Australia. In the commentary on the DVD, the location is incorrectly stated as Edward Street in Balmain (East). In fact, the location was Weston Street, at the end of Paul Street.

The mysterious disappearance of Juanita Nielson also inspired Phillip Noyce, who directed the 1982 film Heatwave.

== Plot ==
The film stars Elizabeth Alexander as Jessica Simmonds, who returns home from London to discover the street she grew up in being torn down by developers for high rise developments. Her father (Alexander Archdale), a vocal opponent of the developers, is killed in a suspicious fire and Jessica takes up the cause of the local residents. She joins forces with Jeff Elliot (John Hargreaves), a union leader. As they probe further into the background of the development they unearth sinister connections between the development group and organised crime.

== Cast ==
- Liz Alexander - Jessica
- John Hargreaves - Elliott
- Reg Lye - Riley
- David Downer - Alan
- Caz Lederman - Nancy
- Alexander Archdale - B.C. Simmonds
- Allen Bickford - Collins
- Gordon McDougall - Sir Arthur Wadham
- Ric Herbert - Ben
- Pnina Bloch - Zoe
- John Stone - Mr. Benson
- Arkie Whiteley - Tina Benson
- Norman Kaye - Mander
- Peter De Salis - Melville

== Production ==
Antony Buckley and Donald Crombie became interested in the story while making The Irishman. The first script was written by actor Michael Craig and was called The Juanita Factor being based directly on Juanita Nielsen. Cecil Holmes then worked on further drafts. However, there was concern the script would not be able to be filmed because of legal issues. It was decided to fictionalise the script and change the character's names.

It was originally intended to cast an overseas star because of the large budget. At one stage Julie Christie was cast but UAA, who were going to finance the film, did not come up with enough money. Helen Morse was then approached; she tentatively agreed but wanted more work done on the script. Evan Jones was brought out to work on a new draft, but despite this Morse eventually declined. Buckley decided not to use UAA to raise money and did it himself.

When Julie Christie was going to play the lead, Bill Hunter was cast opposite her. However, eventually the lead role went to Elizabeth Alexander and Crombie felt she and Hunter did not play well together. So Hunter was replaced by John Hargreaves.

Donald Crombie says making the film was fraught with tension:

We researched it pretty thoroughly and we got fairly close to the beast, I think. We were peculiarly warned off by none other a person than John Dowd, who's a judge now, I believe. He rang Tony Buckley and said that this film was a bit close to the bone and - talking about me - he said, "He's got young children and he should be thinking a bit about what he's doing." It didn't put us off, but you did look under the car for about two days afterwards because you thought, hang on a minute, what's all this about... And the nexus between government and big business and crime. They're very comfortable together.

== Awards ==
The film was entered into the 32nd Berlin International Film Festival, where it won an Honourable Mention.

== Notes ==
- Goldsmith, Ben (2012). "The Killing of Angel Street". Metro.
