= Rough Diamonds (film) =

- Directed by: Donald Crombie
- Written by: Donald Crombie; Christopher Lee
- Produced by: Damien Parer
- Starring: Jason Donovan; Angie Milliken; Peter Phelps; Max Cullen
- Cinematography: John Stokes
- Production companies: Australian Film Finance Corporation; Beyond Films; Film Australia; Film Queensland; Forest Home Films; Nine Network Australia; Southern Star Entertainment
- Release date: 1994
- Running time: 88 minutes
- Country: Australia
- Language: English

Rough Diamonds is a 1994 Australian film directed by Donald Crombie. It was the first lead role in a feature for Jason Donovan.

== Cast ==
- Jason Donovan as Mike Tyrell
- Angie Milliken as Christie Bright
- Peter Phelps as Dozer Brennan
- Max Cullen as Magistrate Roy
- Kit Taylor as Les Finnigan

== Premise ==
Mike Tyrell drives a cattle truck and hits a car parked on the side of the road that belongs to ex-singer Chrissie.

== Production ==
Donald Crombie was inspired to make the film while filming The Irishman in north Queensland in 1977. He saw a farmer, who owned 80,000 hectares of beef country and on paper was a millionaire, working on a council road gang to make money. He wrote this up as a social drama for Film Australia to star Michele Fawdon, but it was never made.

A number of years later Crombie was approached by Damien Parer, who wanted to make features in Queensland and was looking for projects; Crombie showed him his treatment and they developed it into a more populist film. The farmer who needed money became a singer who had a romance with a girl singer and saves his farm on the country and western circuit.

Craig McLachlan was originally going to star but he dropped out to do another job and Jason Donavan was cast instead. The film was financed by Beyond Films and Southern Star Entertainment with finance from the Film Finance Corporation and Film Queensland. It was mostly shot on location in Boonah and Toogoolawah Queensland.

== Release ==
The film contained several songs and was sold by the distributors as a musical. It was bought by Rank in England, which led to it being re-cut without Crombie's input. The director later claimed:

When they [Rank] saw it, they went, "It's not a musical. It's actually a very real social realist drama with some songs." So what they did then, they cut out all the bit that mattered to me, which was the whole story about this bloke losing a property. So the whole reason for the film, the reason I got involved in it and evolved the whole thing, was taken away by the distributor. The FFC in their wisdom backed the distributors and said, "If they think it's got to be like this, it's got to be like this." So I said "Fine," and we parted company. I've never seen the film and I never will, I don't think. It's terrible, I believe, because it doesn't have any heart; there's nothing there. It's never been released, thank God. But I wanted to take my name off it and I was talked out of it, and I now regret that because I realise I should have taken my name off it.
