= Who Killed Jenny Langby? =

- Directed by: Donald Crombie
- Starring: Peter Cummins; Julie Dawson; Anne Deveson
- Country of origin: Australia
- Original language: English

Production
- Running time: 55 minute
- Production company: South Australian Film Corporation

Original release
- Release: 1974

Who Killed Jenny Langby? is a 1974 Australian television documentary directed by Donald Crombie and starring Peter Cummins, Julie Dawson and Anne Deveson. Dawson won the 1974 AACTA Award for Best Actress in a Leading Role.

== Cast ==
- Julie Dawson as Jenny Langby
- Peter Cummins as Frank Langby
- Faith Kleinig as Marge
- Tony Allison as Mick
- Marcus Eyre as Vince / Bikie
- Anne Deveson as Self
