= Julie Dawson (actor) =

Australian actress

- Other names: Julie Dawson Daniels
- Occupation: Actress

Julie Dawson is an Australian actress, billed briefly as Julie Dawson Daniels.

== Career ==
On stage, Dawson has starred in The Training Run at Bondi Pavilion in 1977, Occupation: Comedian (at Courthouse Theatre in 1990), An Office Romance (also at Courthouse Theatre in 1990), and Dear Suburbia (as La Mama in 1992).

Featured screen roles include the first episode of Pig in a Poke in 1977, and other guest roles in Matlock Police, Glenview High and Neighbours. She appeared in family film The Fourth Wish (1976), TV play The Kiss and Ride Ferry (1977) and played the Reverend's wife in Fred Schepisi feature The Chant of Jimmie Blacksmith (1978).

Dawson won the 1974–1975 AFI Award for Best Actress for playing the title role in documentary Who Killed Jenny Langby?, a role that was fully improvised.

== Filmography ==
=== Film ===
Year	Title	Role	Notes
1976	Caddie	Neighbour #2	
1976	The Fourth Wish	Hannah	
1977	The FJ Holden	Mrs. Mason	
1977	The Singer and the Dancer	Mrs. Rogers	
1978	The Chant of Jimmie Blacksmith	Martha Neville	
1978	Little Boy Lost	Ruth Tanner	
1982	Freedom	Foster Mother	

=== Television ===
Year	Title	Role	Notes
1974	Who Killed Jenny Langby'?	Jenny Langby	TV movie
1974	Parent Teacher Interviews	Parent – The Major – The Major	
1975	Two Way Mirror	Kate Johnson	TV movie
1976	Matlock Police	Clare Hansen	
1977	Beyond Reasonable Doubt	Mrs. K.	Miniseries
1977	Pig in a Poke	Mary	
1977	Kiss and the Ride Ferry	Norma	TV movie
1977	Say You Want Me		TV movie
1978	Case for the Defence	Claire Barton	
1978	Chopper Squad	Ann Evans	
1978	Glenview High		
1987	Pals	Alice	
1989	Sugar and Spice	Lady at Railroad Station	
1992	Neighbours	Carol Chapman	

== Theatre ==
Year	Title	Role	Notes	Ref.
1977	The Training Run		Bondi Pavilion, Sydney	
1990	Occupation: Comedian		Courthouse Theatre, Melbourne	
1990	An Office Romance		Courthouse Theatre, Melbourne	
1992	Dear Suburbia		La Mama, Melbourne	
2023	Cats		Twelfth Night Theatre, Brisbane with Queensland Musical Theatre	
