= Stacey's Gym =

- Genre: Drama
- Country of origin: Australia
- No. of seasons: 1
- No. of episodes: 6

Production
- Running time: 30 minutes

Original release
- Network: ABC
- Release: 1974

Stacey's Gym is an Australian television drama which first screened on the ABC in 1974.

== Cast ==
- Patricia Smith
- John Clayton
- Tony Allison
