= Deborah Davis (screenwriter) =

British screenwriter

- Born: London, England
- Occupation: Screenwriter

Deborah Davis is a British screenwriter, known for The Favourite (2018).

== Education ==
She earned an MA from the University of East Anglia.

== Career ==
Davis has a background in practicing law and journalism.

She wrote the first draft of what would become The Favourite in 1998, under the original title The Balance of Power. The Favourite was nominated for numerous awards and accolades. She submitted the story to producer Ceci Dempsey and Ed Guiney, who brought in director Yorgos Lanthimos. Lanthimos introduced Davis to Tony McNamara to help polish the screenplay.

In 2022, premiered a television series Davis wrote based on the life of Marie Antoinette. The Canal+ and BBC production was filmed in France in locations that included Versailles and Vaux-le-Vicomte.

== Writing credits ==
| Production | Type | Year | Company |
|---|---|---|---|
| The Favourite | Feature film | 2018 | Fox Searchlight |
| Marie Antoinette | Television series | 2022 | Canal+ and BBC |

== Awards and nominations ==
The Favourite

| Year | Award | Result |
|---|---|---|
| Best Original Screenplay | Academy Award | Nominated |
| Best Original Screenplay | British Academy Film Awards | Won |
| Best Screenplay | British Independent Film Awards | Won |
| Best Original Screenplay | Critic's Choice Awards | Nominated |
| Best Screenplay | Golden Globe Awards | Nominated |

== See also ==
- List of Academy Award winners and nominees from Great Britain
