= Fiona Crombie =

Australian costume and production designer

- Born: 1973 (age 52–53)
- Occupations: Costume and production designer

Fiona Crombie (born c. 1973) is an Australian costume and production designer. She was nominated for two Academy Awards in the category Best Production Design for the films The Favourite and Hamnet.

Crombie was born in Sydney; where she attended Turramurra Public School. Crombie graduated in 1988 from the National Institute of Dramatic Art (NIDA) and then became the resident designer at the Sydney Theatre Company.

Crombie is the daughter of film director Donald Crombie. She is married to Peter Knowles; they have two children.

== Theatre ==
- Three Sisters, Sydney Theatre Company, 2001
- The Shape of Things, Sydney Theatre Company, January 2003
- Hedda Gabler, Sydney Theatre Company, July 2004; Brooklyn Academy of Music, New York, February 2006
- Journal of the Plague Year, Malthouse Theatre, April 2005
- The Ham Funeral, Malthouse Theatre Company, April 2005
- King Lear, Melbourne Theatre Company, July 2005
- The Cherry Orchard, Sydney Theatre Company, December 2005
- Moving Target (by Marius von Mayenburg), Adelaide Festival, February 2008; Malthouse Theatre, March 2008
- Hamlet, Bell Shakespeare, July 2008
- The Great (by Tony McNamara), Sydney Theatre Company, May 2008
- The City (by Clyde Fitch), Sydney Theatre Company, June 2009
- The Seven Stages of Grieving, Sydney Theatre Company, 2021

== Filmography ==
=== Film ===
| Year | Title | Director |
|---|---|---|
| 2011 | Snowtown | Justin Kurzel |
| 2012 | Dead Europe | Tony Krawitz |
| 2014 | Son of a Gun | Julius Avery |
| 2015 | Macbeth | Justin Kurzel |
| 2015 | Truth | James Vanderbilt |
| 2016 | Una | Benedict Andrews |
| 2018 | Mary Magdalene | Garth Davis |
| 2018 | The Favourite | Yorgos Lanthimos |
| 2019 | The King | David Michôd |
| 2021 | Cruella | Craig Gillespie |
| 2023 | Beau Is Afraid | Ari Aster |
| 2025 | Mickey 17 | Bong Joon-ho |
| 2025 | Hamnet | Chloé Zhao |

=== Television ===
- 2012:Beaconsfield (television film)
- 2013: Top of the Lake
